= Slam Dunk Records =

UK record label

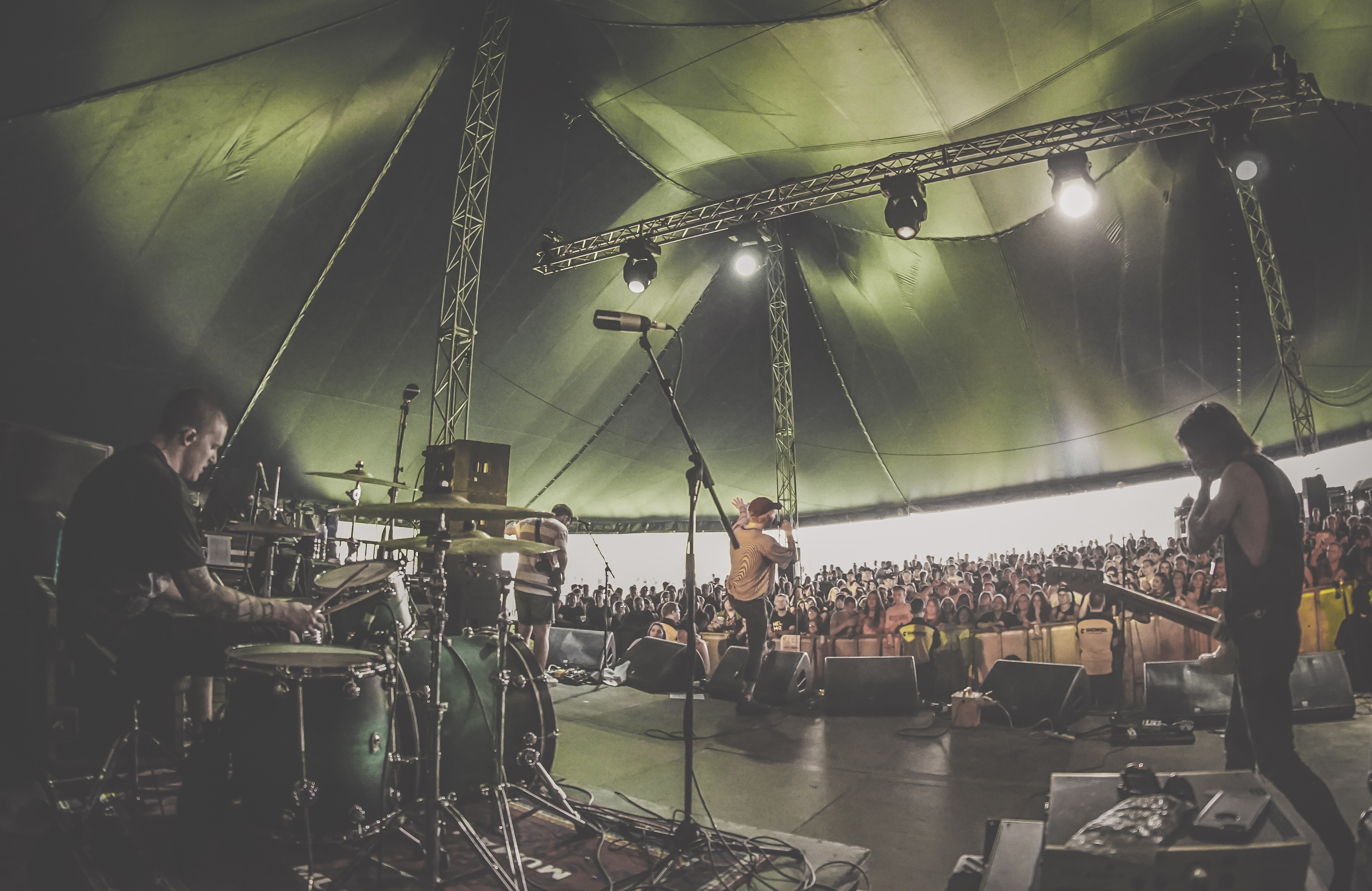
Story Untold at Slam Dunk festival 2019

Slam Dunk Records or Slam Dunk Music is a British independent record label, promoter and concert organising company, founded in Leeds, England, in 2007. Some notable signees include You Me at Six and Decade. The label evolved from "Slam Dunk", a weekly club night held at the city's Cockpit music venue, centered on emo, punk, ska and metal music. They have organised and promoted concerts for Leeds venues such as the Key Club, Leeds University Stylus, Leeds Beckett University Student Union and the First Direct Arena, as well as venues in other cities such as The Dome Leisure Centre, National Exhibition Centre and Hatfield Forum.

== Slam Dunk Festival ==
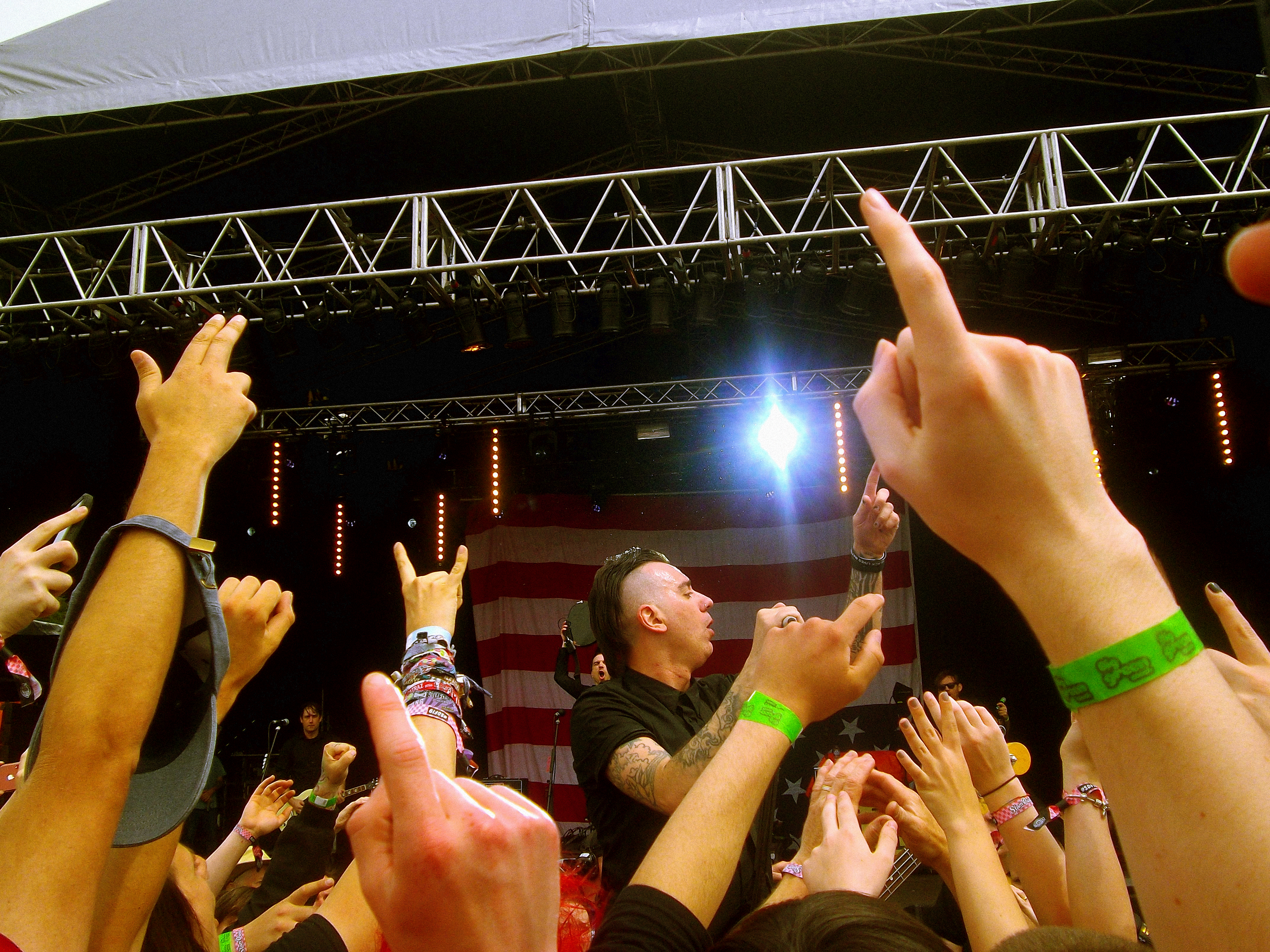
Anti-Flag at Slam Dunk festival 2019

The label is also associated with the Slam Dunk Festival, established in 2006. Although initially small-scale and set up with only a handful of artists, the yearly event now attracts many well-known artists and has slowly established itself as a popular day-long music festival. Initially held in the city's Millennium Square, the event moved to the student union of the University of Leeds in its second year. It is now located in Temple Newsam, Leeds.

The festival attracts more than 40 bands across six different stages. Notable acts which have played at the festival include Fall Out Boy, Thursday, You Me at Six, Hundred Reasons, Reel Big Fish and Paramore.

In 2010, a southern counterpart to the festival had its first year in the University of Hertfordshire, and the now two-day festival became known as Slam Dunk North (Leeds) and Slam Dunk South (Hertfordshire). The festival is normally held on the May Bank Holiday of each year, featuring a mixture of up-and-coming and more established bands, based around punk/emo/metal and ska music.

=== Leeds Millennium Square 2006 ===
Main Stage

Fall Out Boy
The Academy Is...
Thursday
Hundred Reasons
Capdown
The Hush Sound
Hellogoodbye

=== 27 May 2007 – Leeds University ===
Main Stage

Reel Big Fish
Paramore
Mad Caddies
Sonic Boom Six
Failsafe
Beat Union
You Me at Six

=== 25 May 2008 – Leeds University ===
Glamour Kills Stage	The Atticus Stage	The Non Stop Stage	The UK Now! Stage
Cute Is What We Aim For; Boys Like Girls; Kids in Glass Houses; You Me at Six; The Red Jumpsuit Apparatus; We the Kings; Valencia	Story of the Year; Fightstar; The Blackout; Brigade; Flood of Red; We Are the Ocean; Throwing Paper Aeroplanes^{(Atticus Competition Winner)}	Zebrahead; Big D and the Kids Table; Sonic Boom Six; Fandangle; Mr Shiraz; The JB Conspiracy^{(replacement for State Radio)} Random Hand	Tonight Is Goodbye; Furthest Drive Home; Attack! Attack! All or Nothing; All Forgotten; Twin Atlantic; Me Vs Hero

=== 24 May 2009 – Leeds University ===
Glamour Kills Stage	Fishing for Eskimo Stage	The Vans Off The Wall Stage
You Me at Six; Cobra Starship; Kids in Glass Houses; We the Kings; The Audition; Hey Monday; Cash Cash	The Blackout; Silverstein; We Are the Ocean; Hollywood Undead; The Urgency; All Forgotten; Young Guns	Anti-Flag; The Slackers; The King Blues; Sonic Boom Six; Farse; Random Hand; The Skints

The Punktastic.com Stage	The Relentless UK Now! Stage	The Dropdead! Stage
Hundred Reasons; Attack! Attack! Polar Bear Club; Tonight Is Goodbye; Sing It Loud; Me Vs Hero; Save Your Breath	In Case of Fire; Canterbury; Paige; The Auteur; Out of Sight; My Emergency; Winch House^{(People's Choice Winner)}	The Ghost of a Thousand; Devil Sold His Soul; Hexes; Glamour of the Kill; Ruiner; Defeater; Outcry Collective

=== 29/30 May 2010 – Hertfordshire University / Leeds University ===
Glamour Kills Stage	Atticus/Jägermeister Stage	The Vans Off The Wall Stage	Relentless Stage	Imperial Clothing Stage	Kerrang! Introduces Stage	Babycakes Bar	Macbeth Acoustic Stage
New Found Glory; Four Year Strong; Set Your Goals; Hit the Lights; Out of Sight; Every Avenue	Alkaline Trio; Against Me! We Are the Ocean; Rolo Tomassi; Young Guns; Moneen; Save Your Breath	Capdown; Skindred; RX Bandits; Sonic Boom Six; Me Vs Hero; Random Hand; The Skints	The Rocket Summer; Breathe Carolina; Fireworks; Crime in Stereo; The Wonder Years; This Time Next Year; All or Nothing	My Passion; Devil Sold His Soul; Your Demise; Blackhole; Fact; Flood of Red; Azriel	Futures; Deaf Havana; Not Advised; Straight Lines; Kill Casino; Francesqa^{(Kerrang Contest Winner)}	L'Amour La Morgue; Sean Smith^{(DJ set)} Henry Homesweet; Millionaires; Lags^{(DJ set)} Synthetic Season	Get Cape. Wear Cape. Fly^{(Leeds only)} Gavin Butler; Chas Palmer-Williams; Lights & Sound; Lost on Campus; Sam Little; Portia Conn

=== 19/20 May 2011 – Leeds University/Hatfield ===
Jager Stage	Atticus Stage	Macbeth Stage	Honour Over Glory Stage	Introducing Stage	Front Bar Stage	Acoustic Stage
Reel Big Fish; Less Than Jake; The Starting Line; Goldfinger; Anti Flag; Hellogoodbye; The Skints	3OH!3; Mayday Parade; Framing Hanley; Francesqa; Versa Emerge; Not Advised; Rocket to the Moon; We Are the In Crowd; The Dangerous Summer	Set Your Goals; Hit The Lights; Cartel; Attack! Attack! A Loss for Words; This Time Next Year; Failsafe; Decade; With the Punches	We Are the Ocean; Deaf Havana; Dance Gavin Dance; Yashin; While She Sleeps; Bury Tomorrow; Hyro Da Hero; Feed the Rhino; Shadows Chasing Ghosts	Summerlin; Basement; Rio; Lost Boys; Lower Than Atlantis; Don Broco; The Famous Class; Blitz Kids (Competition Winner)	Tek-One; Innerpartysystem; MC Lars; Akira the Don; Faceplant; Oli Brierley; DJ Pesk; DJ SET	Jimmy Holland; The Lion and the Wolf; Lost on Campus; Babar Luck; Tiger Please; Sam Little; Dave House; Ghost Saddles

=== 26/27 May 2012 – Leeds University/Hatfield ===
Jager Stage	Honour Over Glory Stage	Vans Off The Wall Stage	Macbeth Stage
Taking Back Sunday; The Blackout; Funeral for a Friend; Motion City Soundtrack; Say Anything; Lower Than Atlantis; Straight Lines	Architects; Every Time I Die; Cancer Bats; While She Sleeps; Of Mice & Men; The Word Alive; For the Fallen Dreams; I See Stars; Upon a Burning Body	Gallows; Capdown; Set Your Goals; Don Broco; Random Hand; Sharks; Make Do and Mend; Marmozets; Hildamay	Hit the Lights; Transit; The Story So Far; Save Your Breath; Decade; No Trigger; Heartsounds; Misser; Our Time Down Here

=== Slam Dunk Festival 2013 ===
The festival was expanded to be a three date festival in England, where all three dates featured the same lineup. Three minor dates were spun off it, one in Wales, one in Scotland and one in Northern Ireland.

Leeds University (25 May), Hatfield (26 May), Wolverhampton Civic Hall (27 May)
Main Stage	Macbeth Stage	Monster Energy Stage	Vans Stage	Tiger Stage	Front X Sinstar Bar	Keep A Breast Stage
All Time Low; Deaf Havana; Kids in Glass Houses; Sleeping with Sirens; We Are the Ocean; Mallory Knox; The Summer Set; Tonight Alive	Four Year Strong; The Early November; The Wonder Years; Allister; Man Overboard; Fireworks; Transit; The Story So Far; The American Scene	Pierce the Veil; Memphis May Fire; Woe, Is Me; Bury Tomorrow; The Word Alive; Hands Like Houses; Heights; Our Last Night; House vs. Hurricane; Heart in Hand	King Prawn; The Skints; Streetlight Manifesto; Polar Bear Club; Me Vs Hero; Spunge; Itch; MC Lars; Gnarwolves	Cancer Bats; Senses Fail; Devil Sold His Soul; Yashin; Blitz Kids; Handguns; Chunk! No, Captain Chunk! Heroes for Hire	Caspa; Tek-One; Trolley Snatcha; Tyler Mae; Pesk & Boca	Andrew McMahon; Johnny Craig; Gavin Butler; William Beckett; Ace Enders; Chas Palmer Williams; Class of '92; Sophomore; Mark Halls

=== Slam Dunk Festival 2014 ===
The 2014 Festival was held at the same three locations as 2013: Leeds (24 May), Hatfield (25 May) and Wolverhampton (26 May). There was also a smaller lineup in Edinburgh (23 May) and Newport, Wales (27 May).

On 29 April it was announced that Goldfinger had withdrawn from the festival. The band were replaced by the Ataris. On 25 May, it was announced that Landscapes had withdrawn from the festival for both Hatfield and Wolverhampton dates. They were replaced by Great Cynics at Hatfield and Aurora for Wolverhampton.

Leeds University (24 May), The Forum, Hatfield (25 May), Wolverhampton Civic Hall (26 May)
Main Stage	Macbeth Stage	Monster Energy Stage	Atticus Stage	Cheer Up Stage	Antique Acoustic Stage	Uphawr DJ Stage
The All-American Rejects; Mallory Knox; We Are the In Crowd; Motion City Soundtrack; We the Kings; The Skints; Canterbury; Blitz Kids	Less Than Jake; The Ataris; Capdown; Zebrahead; I Am the Avalanche; Gnarwolves; Decade; Jesse James; Fandangle	Bury Tomorrow; Letlive; The Ghost Inside; The Devil Wears Prada; Crown the Empire; Chunk! No, Captain Chunk! I Killed the Prom Queen; Caliban; Heart of a Coward	Kids in Glass Houses; Hit the Lights; Real Friends; Neck Deep; State Champs; Save Your Breath; A Loss for Words; Modern Baseball; Light You Up	Chiodos; The Red Jumpsuit Apparatus; Feed the Rhino; Marmozets; Landscapes; Ghost Town; Natives; Verses; The First	Vinnie Caruana; Chas Palmer-Williams; You, Me, and Everyone We Know; Rob Lynch; The Lion and the Wolf	DJ Yoda; MC Lars; Tek-One

=== Slam Dunk Festival 2015 ===
The 2015 Festival was held at the same three locations as the last two years: Leeds (23 May), Hatfield (24 May) and Wolverhampton (25 May). The Leeds event was moved from Leeds University to Leeds City Centre.

Leeds City Centre (23 May), The Forum, Hatfield (24 May), Wolverhampton Civic Hall (25 May)
Main Stage	Macbeth Stage	Monster Energy Stage	Desperados Stage	Impericon Stage	Fresh Blood Stage	Uphawr DJ Stage
You Me at Six; Taking Back Sunday; Don Broco; Lower Than Atlantis; Neck Deep; We Are the Ocean; Pvris; Set It Off	The Wonder Years; Fireworks; Transit; Such Gold; Bayside; A Loss for Words; Cartel; Roam; Knuckle Puck; As It Is	Architects; While She Sleeps; Finch; Crossfaith; Bury Tomorrow ^{(Special Guests)} Thy Art Is Murder; Beartooth; The Color Morale; SHVPES	Reel Big Fish; Millencolin; Goldfinger; Zebrahead; Mariachi El Bronx; Lightyear; Big D and the Kids Table; Patent Pending; Survay Says!	The Bronx; Gallows; H_{2}O; Comeback Kid; Bane; Stick to Your Guns; Trash Talk; Being as an Ocean; Dead Harts	Moose Blood; Baby Godzilla; Seaway; This Wild Life; Rob Lynch; Fort Hope; Only Rivals; Aaron West and the Roaring Twenties; Wind in Sails; Trash Boat	Tek-One; Daniel & Davyd Winter Bates; The Algorithm; Terufumi Temano; Kyle Clingo; Resident DJs

=== Slam Dunk Festival 2016 ===
The 2016 Festival was held at the same locations as last year for the North and South dates, however the Midlands date had now been moved to the National Exhibition Centre in Birmingham.

Leeds City Centre (28 May), National Exhibition Centre, Birmingham (29 May), The Forum, Hatfield (30 May)
Main Stage	Atlas Stage	The Key Club Stage	Desperados Stage	Impericon Stage	Kerrang! Fresh Blood Stage	Uprawr DJ Stage	Acoustic/Solo Stage
Panic! at the Disco; New Found Glory; Mallory Knox; Yellowcard; Mayday Parade; Young Guns; Moose Blood	Of Mice & Men; Issues; Memphis May Fire; The Amity Affliction; Northlane; We Came as Romans; Miss May I The Word Alive; Coldrain	The Story So Far; The Starting Line; Four Year Strong; Set Your Goals; Real Friends; As It Is; Hit the Lights; Roam; Trash Boat	The King Blues; The Beat; Zebrahead; Capdown; King Prawn; Catch 22; Spunge; The JB Conspiracy	Every Time I Die; Cancer Bats; Norma Jean; Hacktivist; Heart of a Coward; Gnarwolves; Chunk! No, Captain Chunk! WSTR; The One Hundred	New Years Day; Creeper; With Confidence; Waterparks; Blood Youth; Dead! Boston Manor; Cane Hill; Hellions	Shikari Sound System; Dani & David Winter-Bates; Astroid Boys; Mel Clarke; Party Blinders; Resident DJs	The Rocket Summer; Rob Lynch; Grumble Bee; Greywind; The Away Days; Elder Brother; Seafoal; Bethan Leadley; Lianne Kaye

=== Slam Dunk Festival 2017 ===
The 2017 Festival was held at the same locations as last year for all three dates.

National Exhibition Centre, Birmingham (27 May), Leeds City Centre (28 May), The Forum, Hatfield (29 May)
Jägermeister Stage	Monster Energy Stage	The Key Club Stage	Fireball Stage	Impericon Stage	Rock Sound Breakout Stage	Uprawr DJ Stage	Signature Brew Stage
Enter Shikari; Don Broco; Deaf Havana; Beartooth; Bury Tomorrow; We Are the Ocean; Crossfaith; Andrew McMahon in the Wilderness	Neck Deep; The Movielife; We the Kings; The Maine; Cute Is What We Aim For; WSTR; Trophy Eyes; Like Pacific	Tonight Alive; Set It Off; Seaway; Waterparks; With Confidence; Boston Manor; Black Foxxes; Decade; Fort Hope	Bowling for Soup; Less Than Jake; Reel Big Fish; Goldfinger; Mad Caddies; Zebrahead; The Ataris; Fenix Tx	Memphis May Fire; Madina Lake; Stray from the Path; I Prevail; Counterfeit; Ice Nine Kills; Oceans Ate Alaska; SHVPES; Too Close to Touch	Ocean Grove; The Gospel Youth; Sylar; Area 11; Homebound; Makeout; Vukovi; Casey; Better Days; You Know the Drill; All That Was Said	I Am the Avalanche; Nightmare of You; Grumble Bee; Louise Distras; The Lion and the Wolf; Lizzy Farrall	Against Me! The Bronx; Frank Iero and the Patience; Citizen; Turnover; Crime in Stereo; Milk Teeth; Sorority Noise; Puppy

=== Slam Dunk Festival 2018 ===
The 2018 Festival was held at the same North and Midlands locations as last year, however the South date was moved to Hatfield Park.

Leeds City Centre (26 May), Hatfield Park, Hatfield (27 May), National Exhibition Centre, Birmingham (28 May),
Jägermeister Stage	Monster Energy Stage	Fireball Stage	Impericon Stage	Signature Brew Stage	Rock Sound Breakout Stage	The Key Club Acoustic Stage	Uprawr DJ Stage
Good Charlotte; Pvris; Frank Carter & the Rattlesnakes; Sleeping with Sirens; State Champs; Creeper; Four Year Strong; Knuckle Puck	Jimmy Eat World; Taking Back Sunday; Lower Than Atlantis; Moose Blood; Twin Atlantic; Say Anything; The Audition; The Dangerous Summer	Reel Big Fish; Goldfinger; The Skints; Zebrahead; Capdown; Save Ferris; King Prawn; Guttermouth; Templeton Pek	Every Time I Die; Northlane; Comeback Kid; Crown the Empire; Counterparts; The Devil Wears Prada; Astroid Boys; Brutality Will Prevail; Loathe	As It Is; Me Vs Hero; Trash Boat; Roam; Broadside; Homesafe; Can't Swim; Woes	Palaye Royale; Chapel; Dream State; Grayscale; Holding Absence; Milestones; Sleep on It; Stand Atlantic; The Faim	Speak Low If You Speak Love; Four Year Strong; Rob Lynch; Luke Rainsford; Pvmnts; Selfish Things; Cavetown	

=== Slam Dunk Festival 2019 ===
The 2019 Festival was reduced to two days. The North festival was held at Temple Newsam Park on 25 May, and the South festival was held at Hatfield Park on 26 May.

Temple Newsam Park, Leeds (25 May), Hatfield Park, Hatfield (26 May)
Monster Energy Stage	Punk in Drublic Stage	Jägermeister Stage	Impericon Stage	Dickies Stage	Marshall Stage	The Key Club Stage (Left)	The Key Club Stage (Right)	Acoustic Stage
All Time Low; New Found Glory; Neck Deep; Simple Plan; Waterparks; As It Is; Boston Manor; WSTR	NOFX; Bad Religion; Less Than Jake; Millencolin; Lagwagon; The Interrupters; Mad Caddies; Anti-Flag; The Bombpops	Bullet for My Valentine; Atreyu; Story of the Year; Silverstein; The Word Alive; Wage War; The Plot in You	Glassjaw; Gallows; The Bronx; Cancer Bats; Turnstile; Knocked Loose; Angel Dust	The Menzingers; Touche Amore; The Get Up Kids; Saves the Day; Tigers Jaw; Tiny Moving Parts; Milk Teeth	Plain White T's; Hellogoodbye; Real Friends; Seaway; Trophy Eyes; A Loss for Words; William Ryan Key (Yellowcard Acoustic Set)	IDKHow; Grandson; Employed to Serve; Between You & Me; Pagan; Press to Meco; Hot Milk; Kublai Khan	Lights; Microwave; SHVPES; Our Hollow, Our Home; Story Untold; Busted (Note: Busted performed as a part of a secret set. They were unlisted prior to the day of the festival. On the day of the festival they were listed as "Y3K".); Wallflower; Cruel Hand	Justin Pierre; Rob Lynch; Liam Cromby; Chas Palmer-Williams; Lizzy Farrall; Tillie; John Floreani

=== Slam Dunk Festival 2021 ===
The 2020 Festival was to be held at the same two venues as the 2019 festival. The festival was originally scheduled for the North festival to be held at Temple Newsam Park on 23 May, and the South festival will be held at Hatfield Park on 24 May. However the COVID-19 pandemic led to North being rescheduled to 5 September and South to 6 September. On 14 May, Slam Dunk announced that the festival will no longer be held in 2020 although the festival returned on 4 and 5 September 2021.

Temple Newsam Park, Leeds (4 September), Hatfield Park, Hatfield (5 September)
Rock Scene Presents Stage	Punk in Drublic Stage	Jägermeister Stage	The Key Club Stage
Don Broco; Waterparks (Note: Waterparks did not perform at the Hatfield Park date due to a member testing positive for Coronavirus the morning of. This led to Mayday Parade and State Champs playing longer sets.); State Champs; Mayday Parade; We Are the In Crowd; Creeper; As It Is; Hellogoodbye; Roam; The Bottom Line	NOFX; Alkaline Trio; Anti Flag; The Skints; Zebrahead; Frank Turner & The Sleeping Souls; Capdown; Snuff; The Baboon Show; Buster Shuffle (Note: Days N' Daze were originally scheduled to open the Punk in Drublic stage but canceled due to flight redirects.)	While She Sleeps; Bury Tomorrow; Skindred (Note: Escape the Fate were originally scheduled to play third support on the Jägermeister stage but cancelled a week prior to the festival taking place.); Funeral for a Friend; Trash Boat; Your Demise; Comeback Kid; Malevolence; Deez Nuts; Brutality Will Prevail; Loathe; Hacktivist; Blood Youth	Boston Manor (Note: Boston Manor's set was announced six days prior to the festival taking place, having previously been listed as "Special Guest Headliner".); Holding Absence; Normandie; Spunge; Vukovi; Lizzy Farrell; Wargasm; Static Dress; Popes of Chilli Town; Noah Finnce; A McFly (Note: McFly's set was unannounced and listed on official times as "Secret Special Guest".); Weatherstate; Doll Skin; The Hara; For You the Moon

=== Slam Dunk Festival 2022 ===
The North festival was held at Temple Newsam Park on 3 June, and the South festival was held at Hatfield Park on 4 June.

Temple Newsam Park, Leeds (3 June), Hatfield Park, Hatfield (4 June)
Dickies Stage	Jägermeister Stage	Rock Scene Stage	Rock Sound Stage	The Key Club Stage (Left)	The Key Club Stage (Right)
Sum 41; The Dropkick Murphys; The Interrupters; Pennywise; Streetlight Manifesto; The Vandals; Hot Water Music; The Bronx; The Suicide Machines	Alexisonfire; Beartooth; The Amity Affliction; Electric Callboy; Cancer Bats; Silverstein; Counterparts; Cassyette	Neck Deep; The Story So Far; The Wonder Years; Knuckle Puck; KennyHoopla; Hot Milk; Meet Me at the Altar; Beauty School	Deaf Havana; 3OH!3; Set It Off; Stand Atlantic; The Summer Set; Mod Sun; With Confidence; Punk Rock Factory; Chunk! No Captain Chunk! Yours Truly; Between You & Me	Nova Twins; Cold Years; As December Falls; Magnolia Park; MC Lars; Pinkshift; DeathbyRomy; Caskets	Bears in Trees; The Flatliners; Lil Lotus; Mom Jeans; Smrtdeath; In Her Own Words; Point North; Zummo

The Used, the Mighty Mighty Bosstones, Motion City Soundtrack and Spanish Love Songs were all due to play the festival but cancelled.

Alexisonfire's set time was adjusted to avoid clashes with Sum 41 after the Used's withdrawal. The Mighty Mighty Bosstones were replaced by Streetlight Manifesto and Suicide Machines. The Wonder Years played two sets, performing both The Upsides and Surburbia in replacement of Motion City Soundtrack.

=== Slam Dunk Festival 2023 ===
The South festival was held at Hatfield Park on 27 May, and the North festival was held at Temple Newsam Park on 28 May.

Hatfield Park, Hatfield (27 May), Temple Newsam Park, Leeds (28 May)
The Dickies Stage	Amazon music Presents Rock Scene Stage	The KERRANG! Tent (Left Stage)	The KERRANG! Tent (Right Stage)	The Key Club Stages (Left key)	The Key Club Stages (Right key)	The Knotfest Stage
The Offspring; Bowling for Soup; Less Than Jake; Flogging Molly; Gogol Bordello; Millencolin; Zebrahead; Teenage Bottlerocket; Millie Manders and the Shutup	Enter Shikari; Billy Talent; Pvris; Kids in Glass Houses; Underoath; Wargasm; Holding Absence; Trash Boat; Vukovi; Zand	Yellowcard; The Academy Is... Four Year Strong; Real Friends; Fireworks; Hawthorne Heights; Destroy Boys	Creeper; The Menzingers; Boston Manor; Trophy Eyes; Spanish Love Songs; Movements; Sincere Engineer	The Hunna; Jxdn; Sueco; Charlotte Sands; Scene Queen; Emarosa; Youth Fountain	The Maine; Maggie Lindemann; Noahfinnce; Grayscale; LØLØ; Girlfriends; The Tyne	DJ Fresh; Malevolence; We Came as Romans; Escape the Fate; Fit for a King; Landmvrks; Static Dress; Dragged Under; SeeYouSpaceCowboy; Higher Power; Heriot

=== Slam Dunk Festival 2024 ===
The South Festival was held at Hatfield Park on 25 May, and the North festival was held at Temple Newsam Park on 26 May.

Hatfield Park, Hatfield (25 May), Temple Newsam Park, Leeds (26 May)
Slam Dunk Stage	GoPro Stage	Kerrang! Stage	Monster Energy Stage	The Key Club Stage
You Me at Six; The All-American Rejects; Boys Like Girls; State Champs; Mallory Knox; We the Kings; Head Automatica; As December Falls; The Dangerous Summer	I Prevail; Funeral for a Friend; Asking Alexandria; The Ghost Inside; The Blackout; Set It Off; The Red Jumpsuit Apparatus; Caskets; As Everything Unfolds	Waterparks; Palaye Royale; Pale Waves; Against the Current; Bob Vylan; RØRY; Taylor Acorn; Honey Revenge; Artio	The Interrupters; Goldfinger; Pennywise; The Bouncing Souls; The Selecter; The Skints; Mad Caddies; Big D and the Kids Table; Snuff	The Wonder Years; Mom Jeans; L.S. Dunes; La Dispute; H_{2}O; Stick to Your Guns; One Step Closer; Guilt Trip; Arm's Length; Beauty School

=== Slam Dunk Festival 2025 ===
The South festival was held at Hatfield Park on 24 May, and the North festival was held at Temple Newsam on 25 May. European editions, which share some artists with the UK festivals but not the complete line-up, took place in Belgium, the Netherlands, Switzerland, France and Italy.

The line-up for 2025's festivals included prominent artists such as A Day To Remember, Neck Deep and Electric Callboy as the star names for the festival.

Hatfield Park, Hatfield (25 May), Temple Newsam Park, Leeds (26 May)
Main Stage West	Main Stage East	Monster Energy Stage	The Kerrang! Stage	The Key Club Stage
A Day To Remember; Neck Deep; New Found Glory; Hot Mulligan; The Starting Line; Movements; Knuckle Puck; Hit The Lights; Sweetpill	Electric Callboy; The Used; Finch; Stray From The Path; Landmvrks; Imminence; Dream State; Defects	Alkaline Trio; Less Than Jake; Streetlight Manifesto; Zebrahead; The Aquabats; The Ataris; Home Grown; Save Ferris; The Meffs	Hot Milk; Wargasm; As It Is; Twin Atlantic; Noahfinnce; Rain City Drive; I See Stars; Point North; Sophie Powers; Lake Malice	Scowl; Split Chain; Delilah Bon; Graphic Nature; South Arcade; Mouth Culture; Free Throw; Heart Attack Man; Winona Fighter; Greywind

== The Key Club ==
The Key Club is a live music venue and nightclub in the Merrion Centre, Leeds that is owned by Slam Dunk Records. It has a 300-person capacity, is the successor to the Cockpit, and hosts many events that the Cockpit did such as Slam Dunk and the Garage club nights. It is advertised as the "first pure rock venue in Leeds". Some bands who have played at the Key Club include Fit for an Autopsy, Blood Youth, Cancer Bats, Beartooth, Frank Carter and the Rattlesnakes, Idles and the Wonder Years.
