= Hot Milk (band) =

English rock band

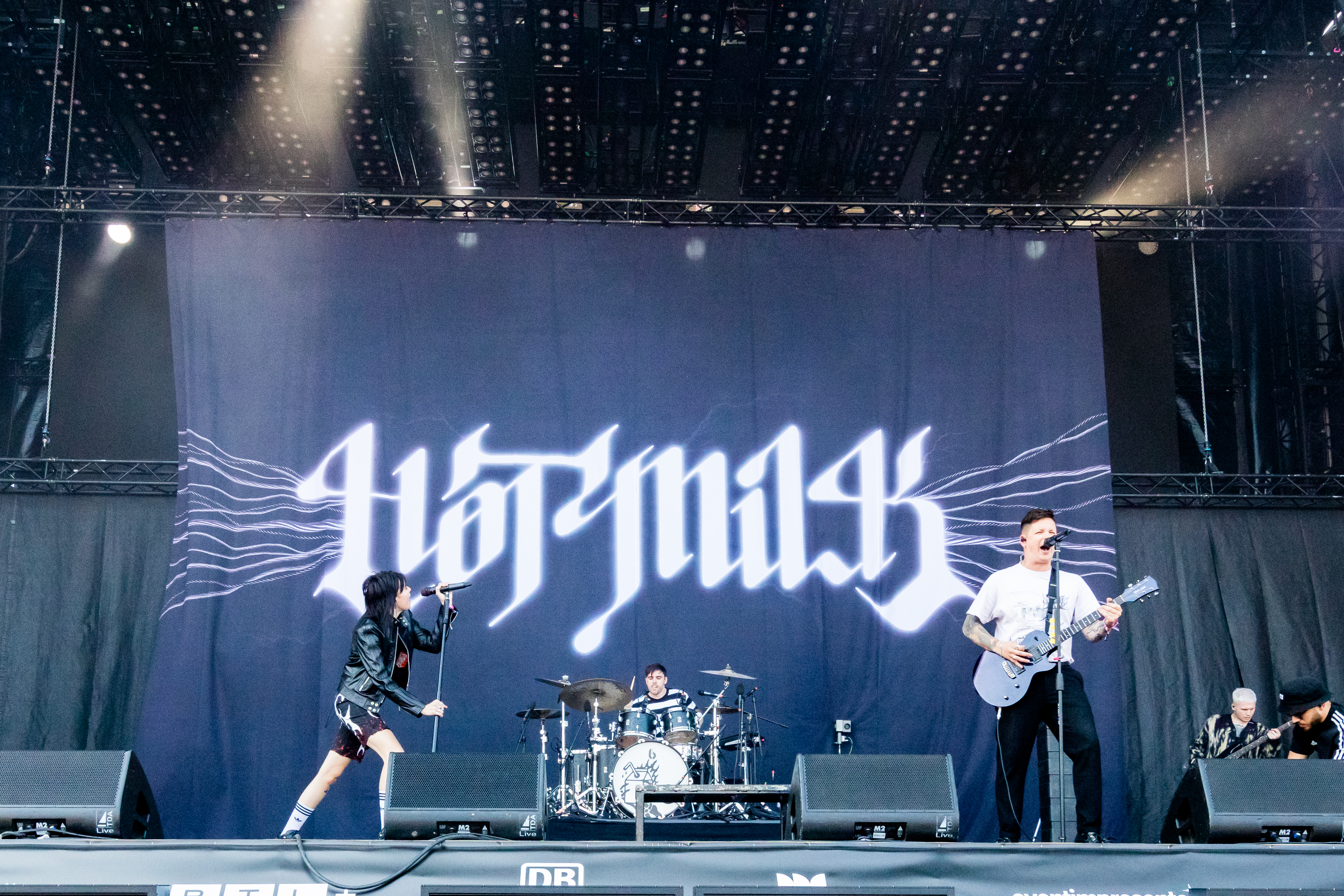
- Hot Milk performing at Rock am Ring 2023

Background information
- Origin: Manchester, England
- Genres: Pop rock; pop punk; emo; power-pop
- Years active: 2018–present
- Label: Music For Nations
- Members: Hannah Mee; Jim Shaw; Tom Paton; Harry Deller
- Website: hotmilk.co.uk

Hot Milk is an English rock band based in Manchester. Formed in 2018 by singer/guitarists Hannah "Han" Mee and Jim Shaw, the group is known for their genre-blurring sound and for lyrics that often address social and political issues. Signed to the British indie label Music For Nations since 2021, they have released three EPs and released their debut studio album, A Call to the Void, on 25 August 2023. They have toured with acts including Foo Fighters and You Me at Six, appeared at Download Festival and Lollapalooza, and have received radio play from BBC Radio 1 and Kerrang! Radio. Additionally, they have been noted by Alternative Press as part of a new wave of artists in the Manchester music scene.

== History ==
=== 2018–2019: Origins and Are You Feeling Alive? ===
Hot Milk was founded in Manchester, England in 2018. Band founders Hannah "Han" Mee and Jim Shaw had met via Tinder and dated for four years, ultimately remaining close friends and housemates. They were also involved in the local Manchester music scene; both Mee and Shaw had been in various bands since age 16, and at the time of Hot Milk's founding, Mee was working as a tour promoter and Shaw as a lighting director. One night in January 2018, while grieving a friend who had passed, the pair wrote their first song together, "Take Your Jacket", in 25 minutes on acoustic guitar while drunk off a bottle of wine. After writing several more songs, Mee and Shaw anonymously sent the demos to contacts in the industry and, after getting positive feedback, secured management and recruited bassist Tom Paton and drummer Harry Deller, whom they knew from the local scene. The band was formed in the same apartment Oasis' Noel Gallagher had written (What's the Story) Morning Glory?. Mee has said the name Hot Milk is "a bit short and snappy, a bit of an oxymoron. The name doesn’t really mean anything: I just thought it sounded cool, and there wasn’t a Hot Milk in existence. And that’s what we called it because when you get to names of bands, they don’t really mean anything when you get big and busy."

Hot Milk's first single, "Awful Ever After", was released in January 2019, and "Take Your Jacket" was released as a second single in March. Both singles received BBC Radio 1 play on programs like Daniel P. Carter's Rock Show, Phil Taggart's Hype Chart, and Annie Mac's Future Sounds, as well as on Kerrang! Radio. February saw the band make their live debut opening for You Me at Six on their European tour, beginning with a show at Kavka Zappa in Antwerp. Over the course of the year, despite having released very few songs, the group opened for Deaf Havana, Papa Roach, Enter Shikari, and Foo Fighters and appeared at festivals including Reading and Leeds, Download Festival, Live at Leeds, The Great Escape, and Slam Dunk Festival. During these tours, the band received positive attention from You Me At Six frontman Josh Franceschi and Foo Fighters guitarist Pat Smear.

Hot Milk self-released their debut EP, Are You Feeling Alive?, on 3 May 2019. It was recorded with producer Phil Gornell (Bring Me the Horizon, All Time Low) and mixed by Dan Lancaster; vocals were partially recorded at a hotel in Birmingham due to scheduling conflicts. The EP was released to mixed to positive reviews, one of which called Hot Milk "one of the most exciting acts to emerge on the pop-punk scene in the last while". Music videos were filmed for "Awful Ever After" and "Take Your Jacket", as well as for "Wide Awake" and the EP's title track. The group also toured with Australian rock band The Faim in December.

=== 2019–2021: Signing to Music For Nations and I Just Wanna Know What Happens When I'm Dead ===
In late 2019, Hot Milk released the single "Candy Coated Lies", which was later remixed by Blink-182's Mark Hoppus and Lovelytheband's Mitchy Collins. This was followed throughout 2020 by singles including "June Gloom", "Glass Spiders", and "California's Burning". A portion of the proceeds from a limited-edition vinyl release of "California's Burning" were donated to Black Lives Matter and Stop Hate UK. With touring suspended due to the COVID-19 pandemic, Hot Milk performed at the virtual Five4Five Festival, alongside Deaf Havana, Don Broco, As It Is, Enter Shikari, Fatherson, The Dangerous Summer, and Tigress; the event raised money for NHS Charities Together. The band also began writing and recording a second EP at home in quarantine; Jim Shaw handled production, while Zakk Cervini mixed the record and co-wrote the title track.

The first half of 2021 saw Hot Milk return to Reading and Leeds (sharing a date with Queens of the Stone Age, Yungblud, Neck Deep, Girl in Red, Ivorian Doll, 100 gecs, and Sofi Tukker) and Download Festival (sharing a date with Frank Carter and the Rattlesnakes, Neck Deep, Boston Manor, Sleep Token, Holding Absence, and Malevolence). In June, it was announced Hot Milk had signed to British indie label Music For Nations, who would be releasing the band's second EP, I Just Wanna Know What Happens When I'm Dead, in September. Simultaneous with this announcement, the title track was released as a single. This was followed by "I Think I Hate Myself" in July and "Split Personality" in September. The EP was released on 10 September 2021 by Music For Nations. Kerrang! named the record one of "the 10 best EPs of 2021", writing that the group "continue to deliver with effervescent ease." The band were also featured in Kerrang!'s "The K! Pit" showcase, performing at the bar Blondies in London, and embarked on a tour of the UK.

=== 2021–2022: The King and Queen of Gasoline ===
Hot Milk supported Pale Waves on their tour of the UK and Ireland in early 2022. In March, the band announced a third EP for Music For Nations, entitled The King and Queen of Gasoline, and released the lead single "Bad Influence". Mee and Shaw wrote the EP in a month, partially in a Los Angeles hotel room using Dave Grohl's guitar and Mark Hoppus' bass guitar, with Shaw once again producing and John Feldmann co-writing the title track.

In May, the band embarked on their first headliner tour in America, performed at BottleRock Napa Valley, and released a second single, "Teenage Runaways", which they would perform on Jimmy Kimmel Live! later in the year. They returned to Slam Dunk Festival in June, headlined by Alexisonfire and Rancid and alongside The Used, The Wonder Years, Motion City Soundtrack, and Meet Me at the Altar. In July, they released the single "I Fell In Love With Someone I Shouldn't Have" and played several headlining dates in America, as well as joining the Sad Summer Festival alongside Waterparks, Neck Deep, Mayday Parade, State Champs, Hot Mulligan, The Summer Set, and LØLØ, and performing at Lollapalooza's Chicago Made Showcase.

The King and Queen of Gasoline released on 5 August 2022. In the following months, the band joined Blackbear's Nothing Matters Tour alongside Waterparks, State Champs, Mod Sun, and Heart Attack Man. In July, they joined the Foo Fighters and Courtney Barnett for a tour date at the London Stadium. They were also announced to join the Foo Fighter's Australian and New Zealand tour alongside The Chats, Teenage Joans, Teen Jesus and the Jean Teasers, and Amyl and the Sniffers, although the tour was cancelled due to the death of Foo Fighters drummer Taylor Hawkins.

=== 2023: A Call to the Void ===
In February 2023, Hot Milk headlined a pair of shows entitled "England's Screaming" at London's KOKO and Manchester's The O_{2} Ritz, where they were accompanied by As December Falls, Jools, and Clarence. The following month, the band announced that their debut full-length album, A Call to the Void, had been produced with Shaw in Manchester, Los Angeles, and Stockholm and would be released on 25 August 2023 via Music For Nations, simultaneously releasing the album's lead single "Horror Show". The single subsequently reached No. 4 on The Kerrang! Chart the week of 31 March 2023. The band was announced to appear in May at the inaugural Adjacent Festival, headlined by Blink-182 and Paramore, and to return to Download Festival in June with Bring Me the Horizon, Architects, Evanescence, Within Temptation, Neck Deep, as well as appearances at Rock Werchter, Main Square Festival, TRNSMT, and Reading and Leeds throughout the summer.

=== 2024–present: Corporation P.O.P ===
On 6 September 2024, the band released a non-album single titled "Where Does the Light Get In?", along with a music video. On 28 February 2025, the band released another single titled "90 Seconds to Midnight", along with a music video, and the announcement of their second studio album titled Corporation P.O.P, set to release on 27 June 2025. The album's second single, "Swallow This", was released on 4 April 2025, along with a music video. The third single, "Insubordinate Ingerland", was released on 9 May 2025, along with a music video. The fourth single, "The American Machine", was released on 17 June 2025, along with a music video.

== Musical style ==
Hot Milk's music primarily draws from pop rock, power pop, emo, pop-punk, and alternative rock, (Note: Musical styles: pop rock; power pop; emo; pop-punk; alternative rock) as well as elements of post-hardcore, arena rock, punk rock, hip hop, and classic rock. Vocalists Han Mee and Jim Shaw have self-described their sound as "emo powerpop", although they have often rejected being limited to a specific genre, proclaiming in several interviews that "Genre is a lie". Alternative Press have noted that the band "are careful not to pin themselves down as any one genre. They can go heavier or poppier with every release, keeping their listeners on their toes."

The band's earliest songs were described by Music Week as "early Paramore with a neat co-vocal spin". Around the time of their first EP, they displayed a more pop-focused sound with elements of EDM and electropop. Their music in this era drew comparisons to Tonight Alive, All Time Low, Forever the Sickest Kids, The Summer Set, The 1975, Metro Station, and Teenage Dream-era Katy Perry, and was described as "genre-fluid", "neon bright and loaded with calorific hooks", and "infectiously fizzy". By their second EP, however, they had begun incorporating darker and heavier sounds, drawing from alternative rock, post-hardcore, hip-hop, drum and bass, and screamo, and were compared to acts like Stand Atlantic, As It Is, Pvris, KennyHoopla, Yungblud, Blink-182, and Trash Boat. For their third EP, The King and Queen of Gasoline, the band embraced a more anthemic arena-focused sound that used strings, piano, saxophone, synthesizers, and choir vocals. The title track was described by the Daily Express as "a punk 'Bohemian Rhapsody'", and the band in this era saw comparisons to Boston Manor and American Idiot-era Green Day.

Hot Milk have cited an eclectic range of influences across various genres. Hannah Mee grew up on punk rock artists, first discovering Green Day before expanding to older artists like Operation Ivy, The Replacements, Ramones, The Clash, The Runaways, Joan Jett, Rancid, and Bikini Kill. She (Note: Han Mee uses both she/her and they/them pronouns. This article uses the former for consistency and clarity.) has also cited Beach Boys, The Prodigy, My Chemical Romance, MGMT, Taking Back Sunday, and genres like jazz, indie-electro, house, and the Haçienda era of drum and bass as musical inspirations. A self-taught musician, Mee's performing style was influenced by Freddie Mercury and Keith Flint, and she has variously used an American accent and her natural Northern English accent while singing. Jim Shaw, meanwhile, grew up on acoustic music in the vein of Get Cape. Wear Cape. Fly, saying "[Hot Milk's] tunings are all open tunings", and has named Ariana Grande, Sigrid, Dermot Kennedy, No Rome, Chelsea Cutler, Closure in Moscow, Dance Gavin Dance, I the Mighty, Architects, and older dirty house music as personal favorites. The band have also taken inspiration from Billie Eilish, Halsey, Bring Me the Horizon, Linkin Park, Twenty One Pilots, Andy C, Bicep, Oasis, Descendents, Queen, Metallica, Black Sabbath, and Madonna.

Hot Milk's lyrical themes have varied from an early focus on lighter relationship material to tackling darker themes of mental health, substance abuse, self-sabotage, and teenage rebellion. Additionally, as early as the release of "Candy Coated Lies", the band has often lyrically addressed social and political issues including capitalism, LGBT rights, gun violence, and climate crisis. Mee, who holds a master's degree in politics, has credited her studies as well as her early love of punk music with influencing her political outlook, and has said, "If you’re not using your music to [say something], what the fuck is the point? Just put your guitar back on the stand and bugger off."

== Members ==
Hot Milk live at Rock am Ring 2023

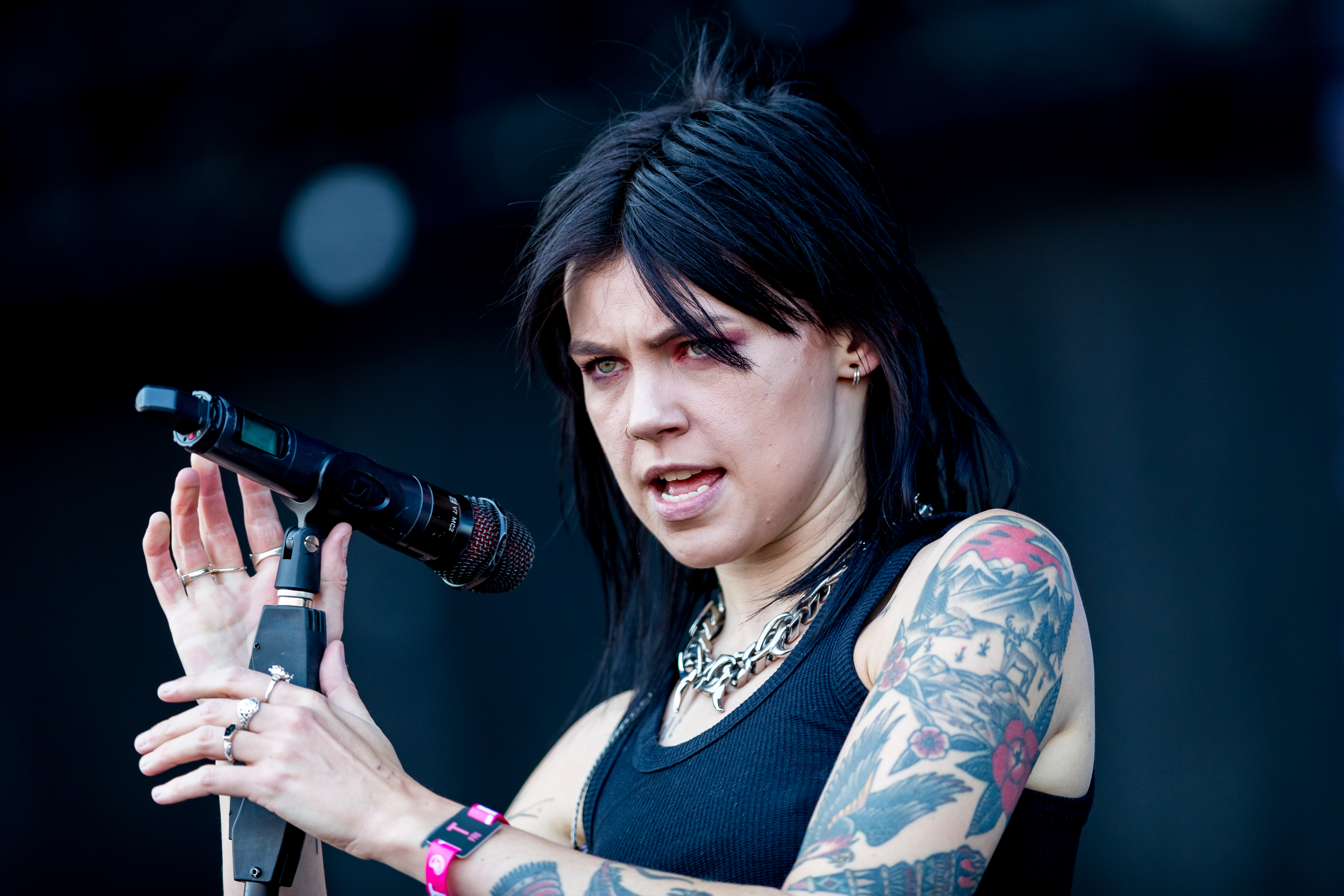
Han Mee

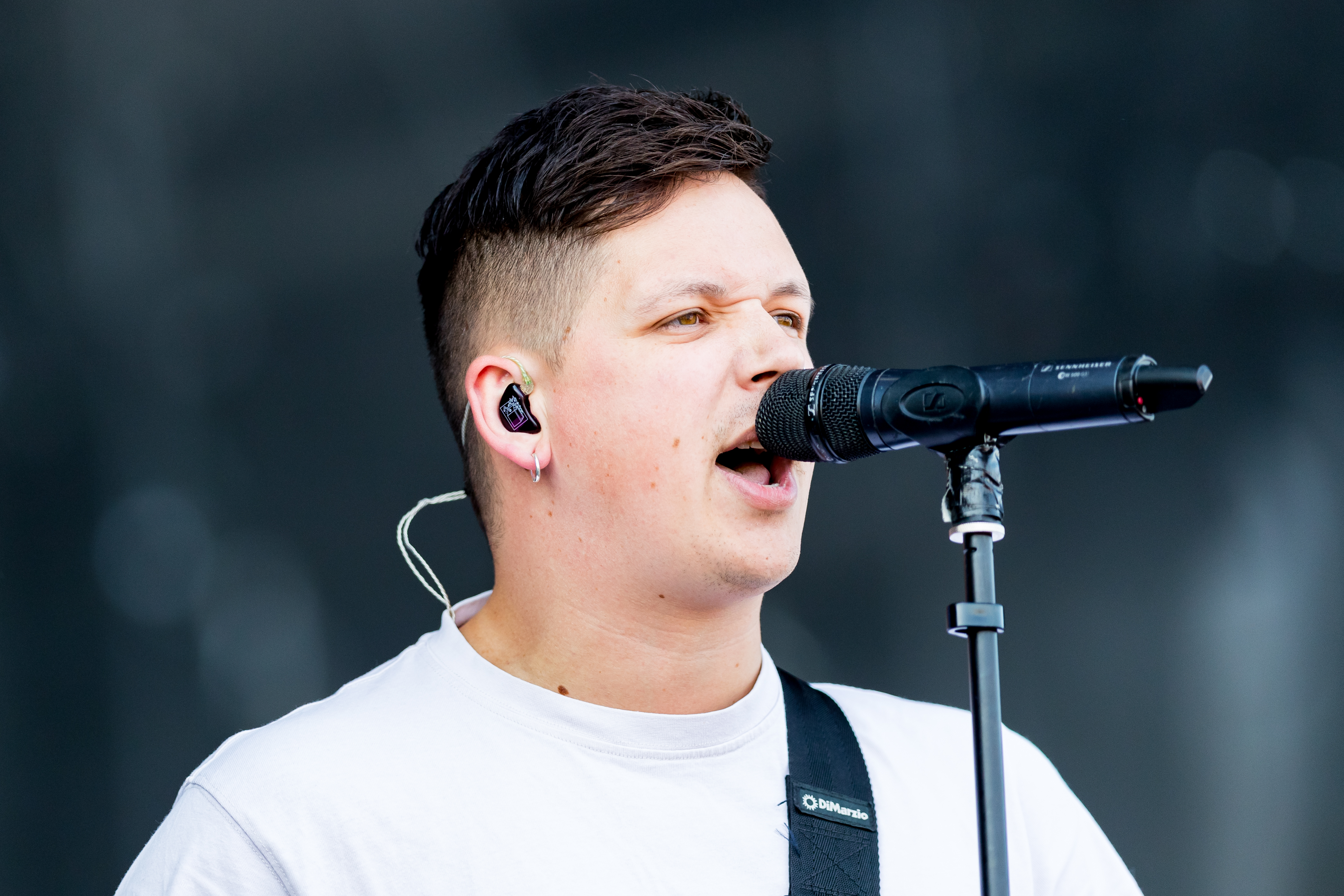
Jim Shaw

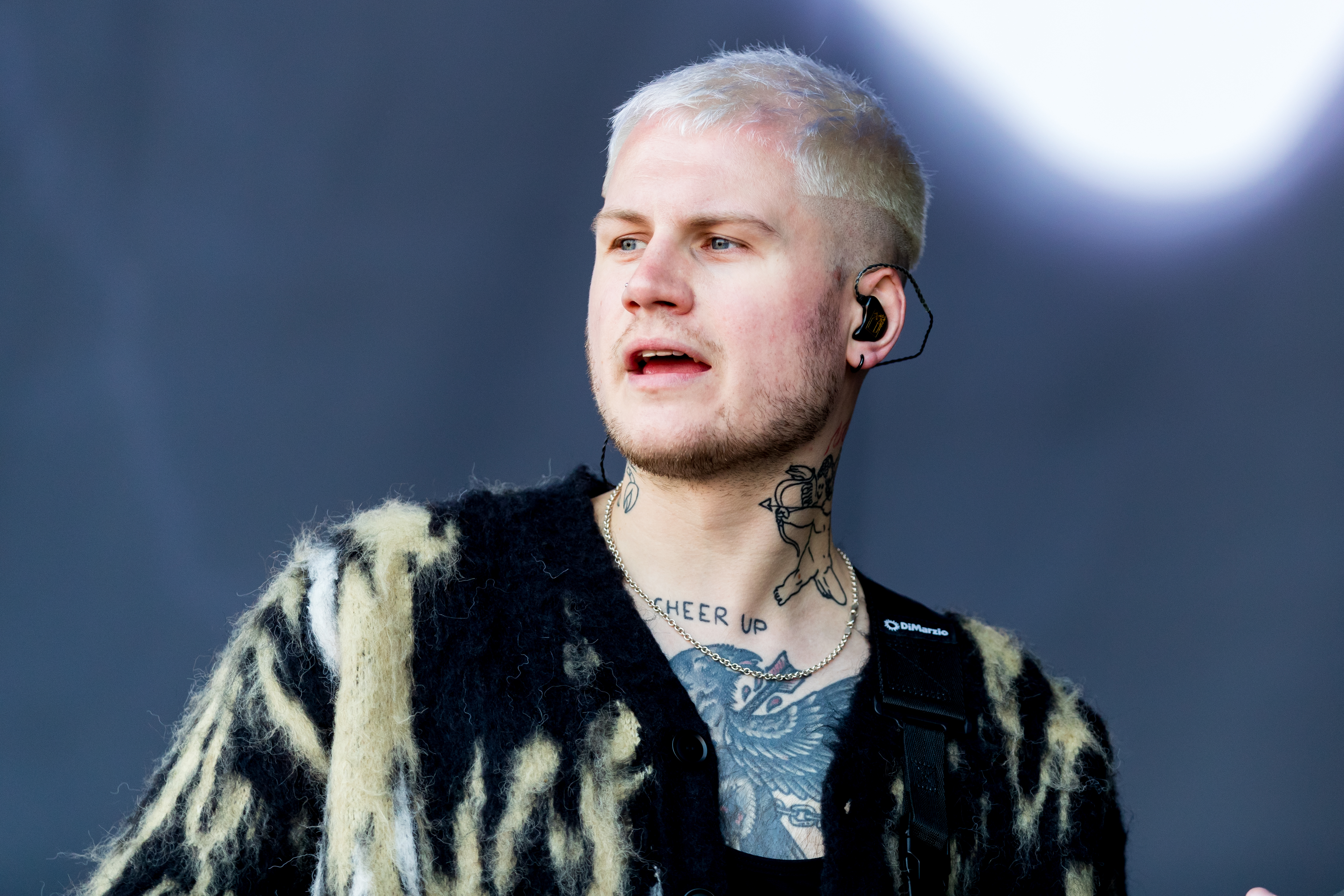
Tom Paton

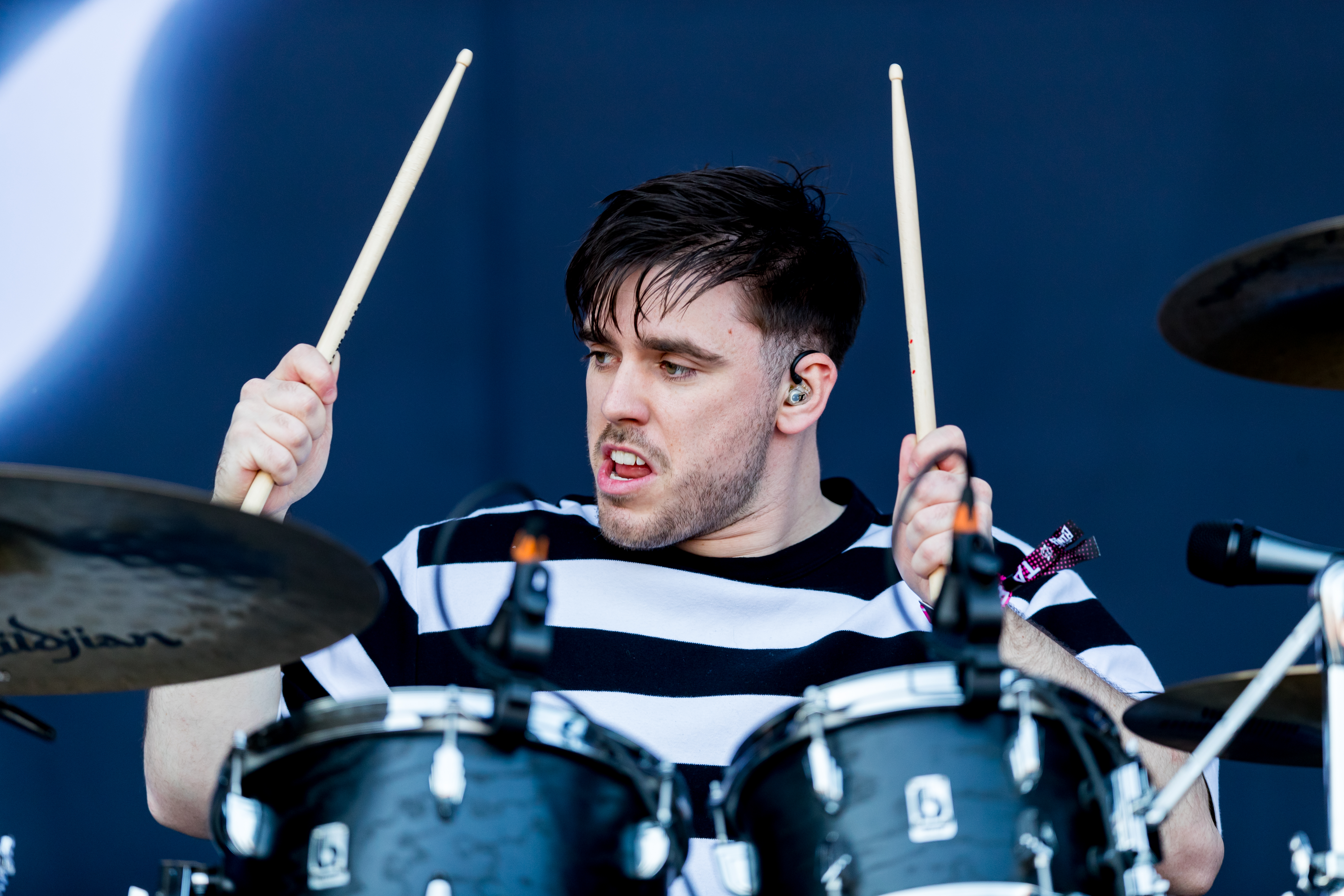
Harry Deller

=== Current members ===
- Han Mee – lead vocals, rhythm guitar
- Jim Shaw – co-lead vocals, guitar
- Tom Paton – bass
- Harry Deller – drums

=== Touring members ===
- Isaac Anderson – keyboards, rhythm guitar, backing vocals (2020–2021)
- Aaron Stechauner – drums, percussion (2023)
- Rich Saintclair – rhythm guitar (2023)

== Discography ==
=== Studio albums ===
List of studio albums, with selected details
Title	Album details	Peak chart positions		
Title	Album details	UK	UK Rock	SCO
A Call to the Void	Released: 25 August 2023; Label: Music for Nations; Formats: DL, CD, 12"	40	2	13
Corporation P.O.P	Released: 27 June 2025; Label: Music for Nations; Formats: DL, CD, 12"	—	3	—

=== EPs ===
List of EPs, with selected details
Title	EP details
Are You Feeling Alive?	Released: 3 May 2019; Label: Self-released; Formats: DL, CD, 7"
I Just Wanna Know What Happens When I'm Dead	Released: 10 September 2021; Label: Music For Nations/Sony; Formats: DL, CD, 12"
The King and Queen of Gasoline	Released: 5 August 2022; Label: Music for Nations; Formats: DL, CD, 12"

=== Singles ===
List of singles
Title	Year	Album
"Awful Ever After"	2019	Are You Feeling Alive?
"Take Your Jacket"	2019	Are You Feeling Alive?
"Candy Coated Lies"	2019	Non-album singles
"June Gloom"	2020	Non-album singles
"Wide Awake (in Awful Ever After)"	2020	Non-album singles
"California's Burning"	2020	Non-album singles
"Candy Coated Lies" (Mark Hoppus + Mitchy Collins remix)	2020	Non-album singles
"Glass Spiders"	2020	Non-album singles
"I Just Wanna Know What Happens When I'm Dead"	2021	I Just Wanna Know What Happens When I'm Dead
"I Think I Hate Myself"	2021	I Just Wanna Know What Happens When I'm Dead
"Split Personality"	2021	I Just Wanna Know What Happens When I'm Dead
"Woozy"	2021	I Just Wanna Know What Happens When I'm Dead
"The Good Life"	2021	I Just Wanna Know What Happens When I'm Dead
"Bad Influence"	2022	The King and Queen of Gasoline
"Teenage Runaways"	2022	The King and Queen of Gasoline
"I Fell In Love with Someone I Shouldn't Have"	2022	The King and Queen of Gasoline
"The King and Queen of Gasoline"	2022	The King and Queen of Gasoline
"Horror Show"	2023	A Call to the Void
"Party on My Deathbed"	2023	A Call to the Void
"Bloodstream"	2023	A Call to the Void
"Breathing Underwater"	2023	A Call to the Void
"Where Does The Light Get In?"	2024	Non-album single
"90 Seconds to Midnight"	2025	Corporation P.O.P
"Swallow This"	2025	Corporation P.O.P
"Insubordinate Ingerland"	2025	Corporation P.O.P
"The American Machine"	2025	Corporation P.O.P

=== Music videos ===
Title	Year	Director
"Awful Ever After"	2019	James Kennedy
"Take Your Jacket"	2019	Lewis Cater
"Wide Awake"	2019	Lewis Cater
"Are You Feeling Alive?"	2019	James Kennedy
"Candy Coated Lies"	2019	James Kennedy
"Wide Awake (in Awful Ever After)"	2020	James Kennedy
"California's Burning"	2020	James Kennedy
"Glass Spiders"	2020	James Kennedy
"I Just Wanna Know What Happens When I'm Dead"	2021	Hot Milk
"I Think I Hate Myself"	2021	Hot Milk & James Kennedy
"Split Personality"	2021	Zak Pinchin
"Woozy"	2021	Jessie-Rose Lena
"The Good Life"	2021	Rory Barnes & Frederica Burelli
"Bad Influence"	2022	Hot Milk
"Teenage Runaways"	2022	Hot Milk
"I Fell In Love With Someone I Shouldn't Have"	2022	Hot Milk
"The King and Queen of Gasoline"	2022	Hot Milk
"Horror Show"	2023	Hot Milk
"Party on My Deathbed"	2023	Hot Milk
"Bloodstream"	2023	Hot Milk
"Breathing Underwater"	2023	Hot Milk
"90 Seconds To Midnight"	2025	Hot Milk
"Swallow This"	2025	Hot Milk
"Insubordinate Ingerland"	2025	Hot Milk
"The American Machine"	2025	Hot Milk
"Sympathy Symphony"	2025	Hot Milk
