= Tigress (band) =

English alternative rock band from Chelmsford

- Origin: Chelmsford, England, United Kingdom
- Genres: Alternative rock, pop rock
- Years active: 2015–present
- Labels: Humble Angel Records; LAB Records
- Members: Katy Jackson; Tom Harrison; Sean Bishop; Jack Divey
- Past members: Josh Coombes
- Website: http://www.tigressofficial.com

Tigress are a British rock band from Chelmsford, England. They first performed together as the Hype Theory but reformed as Tigress in August 2015, abandoning their early songs. Tigress consists of vocalist Katy Jackson, guitarists Tom Harrison and Sean Bishop and bassist Jack Divey. The band is currently independent. They were previously signed to Humble Angel Records where they released their debut album 'Pura Vida' on the 3rd September 2021 and LAB Records where they released their debut EP Human on 13 November 2015, follow up EP Like It Is on 12 May 2017 and 2018 EP Who Cares. All releases were met with much acclaim across a number of major and independent music publications.

== History ==
Tigress originally performed under the name the Hype Theory, and during this time the band's sound was far more pop-rock and pop-punk focused. They gained traction after becoming one of the finalists for the Red Bull Bedroom Jam competition in 2011, which allowed them to perform at a number of high profile festivals that summer, including Sonisphere and Download. As The Hype Theory, they released their debut album Glory Days on 10 October 2011, and its follow-up Captives on 27 May 2013, both through Small Town Records.

On 27 August 2015, the band announced that they had officially changed their name to Tigress with immediate effect, and would subsequently no longer perform any material released as the Hype Theory. They would revive their music from this era for the Autumn 2025 shows in Liverpool, Birmingham and London.

Tigress released their debut EP Human on 13 November 2015. It was co-produced by You Me at Six guitarist Max Helyer and John Mitchell at Outhouse Studios in Reading and mixed by Romesh Dodangoda. The band's first show was performing at the Vans Warped Tour UK kick-off party at the Brooklyn Bowl in London on 14 September 2015. This was followed by a UK tour with Metro Station and a slot at the Vans Warped Tour UK at Alexandra Palace, London on 18 October 2015.

In support of the Human EP release, 2016 saw Tigress go out on a short headline tour in June which included a sold-out show in the band's hometown of Chelmsford. The band also played with Alvarez Kings and Fort Hope. In late 2016, the band went into Middle Farm Studios to record their Like It Is EP with Peter Miles.

In March 2017 the band went on a UK and mainland Europe tour with Counterfeit. They were joined by Decade in mainland Europe and Faux in the UK. Prior to the Counterfeit support tour, TIGRESS played Seaway's headline London show in February. They were joined by WSTR. On 12 May 2017, the band released the Like It Is EP. This was followed by a set at The Great Escape Festival in Brighton, performing with Green Day at British Summer Time in Hyde Park and a tour of Russia and Eastern Europe with Billy Talent. In October 2017, Tigress showcased at the BBC Music Introducing conference Amplify, supported The One Hundred in London and performed at 2Q Festival in Lincoln.

February 2018 saw Tigress open for Japan's Man With A Mission in London, followed by an appearance at Spring Break Festival in Poland on 21 April. The band supported InMe in May, which was followed by the release of their third EP Who Cares. June saw the band perform on the Avalanche Stage at Download Festival. Towards the end of the year the band opened for The Xcerts and Skindred.

May 2019 saw Tigress play Hit The North Festival in Newcastle. This was followed by a tour of the UK and Germany with Story Untold and Between You And Me. The end of the month saw TIGRESS release a cover of Massive Attack's Teardrop.

In June 2019 Tigress played their first ever festival in Germany, performing at Theatron Pfingstfestival in Munich.

July 2019 saw the band open for Bring Me The Horizon in Bologna, Italy. Enter Shikari were also on the bill.

In early October 2019, Tigress went on a headline tour of the UK playing shows in Glasgow, Liverpool, Manchester, Birmingham and London. Towards the end of October, the band supported Skindred at Cwmbran Stadium in Cwmbran, Wales.

In March 2020, Tigress announced they had signed to Humble Angel Records.

In May 2020, Tigress were part of Five4Five Fest, a brand new stay at home online festival raising money for NHS Charities Together. The band played alongside Don Broco, Deaf Havana, Yonaka, Hot Milk, Stay Free, Lizzy Farrall, Rob Lynch, Lacey, Enter Shikari, As It Is, Fatherson, Trash Boat, Roam, The Dangerous Summer and Wargasm.

In October 2020, Tigress released their single "Choke", accompanied by an animated music video by Aidan Stadler. The song was produced by Adrian Bushby and mastered by Harry Hess.

In April 2021, Tigress announced their debut album, Pura Vida, produced by Adrian Bushby and mastered by Harry Hess, followed up by the release of single "Disconnect". Drummer Josh Coombes directed the music video for the single.

In August 2021, Tigress released 'F.L.Y.', the third single from Pura Vida. The album was released in September 2021.

In November 2021, Tigress embarked on a co-headline tour of the UK with Bleak Soul (fronted by ex. As It Is guitarist Benjamin Langford-Biss). The band played in Glasgow, Newcastle, Manchester, Liverpool, Birmingham and Bristol. Tigress and Bleak Soul were scheduled to perform in Brighton, Leeds and London, but were unable to do so, due to members of their touring party testing positive for COVID-19.

In May 2022, the band were main support to Feeder in Newcastle and Nottingham on their Torpedo UK tour.

In June 2022, the band were main support to Billy Talent on their UK tour. The band opened for Evanescence in Rostock, Germany and Tampere, Finland. The show in Tampere was the band's first arena show. En-route to Tampere, Finnair lost all of Tigress' backline resulting in the band playing their first ever arena with none of their own gear. The band also opened for Spiritbox in Utrecht, Netherlands and Hamburg, Germany.

In August 2022, the band were main support to Anti-Flag in Nottingham and London on their 'Welcome To 1984' UK tour. The band also performed at Reading and Leeds Festival, playing on the Festival Republic Stage.

In September 2022, the band performed two UK headline shows in London and Birmingham.

In November 2022, the band performed at Pick It Up Festival in High Wycombe with WSTR.

In December 2022, the band were main support to Evanescence in Lisbon, Portugal and Madrid, Spain. The band also released an acoustic take of their song "A Letter To Death (Cry Your Heart Out)", titling it 'A Letter to Death (Reimagined)'.

In June 2023, the band were main support to Evanescence in Warsaw, Poland and Lille, France. The band also performed at Download Festival in the UK and Rock For People in the Czech Republic.

In April 2024, the band released their single 'Blah Blah Blah'.

In May 2024, the band released their single 'Freefall'.

In July 2024, the band released their single 'B-O-R-E-D' and performed at 2000trees.

In August 2024, the band released their single 'Rare'.

In October 2024, the band released their single 'Save Yourself'.

In late 2024 Joshua Coombes, the drummer of Tigress, joined and started appearing on the Staying Relevant Podcast with Pete Wicks and Sam Thompson as Digital Josh.

In January 2025, the band released their sophomore album 'Are You B-O-R-E-D?'. The band also headlined a sold-out show at Paper Dress Vintage in London to support the album release.

In April 2025, the band were main support to Orchards in the UK.

In June and July 2025, the band were main support to Alien Ant Farm, Zeal & Ardor and Skunk Anansie in mainland Europe.

In September 2025, the band headlined shows in London, Liverpool and Birmingham without drummer Josh Coombes. The band released an acoustic EP titled Reimagined, Volume 1 featuring the song "Say Goodbye to 29".

The band are managed by Satvir Bhamra. Bhamra currently works for RCA Records, having previously spent time at 0207 Def Jam (the London-based arm of Def Jam Recordings), BMG, Universal Music Catalogue, Warner Music Group, EMI and Sony Music. Tigress are booked by ITB (International Talent Booking) for the world excluding North America.

Tigress receive regular radio play from BBC Radio 1, BBC Introducing, Kerrang! Radio, Radio X, and Triple J in Australia, and have seen press coverage from Kerrang!, Rock Sound, Upset, The Metro, and Alternative Press.

== Band members ==
- Katy Jackson – lead vocals
- Tom Harrison – guitar
- Jack Divey – bass
- Sean Bishop – guitar

== Discography ==
=== Studio albums ===
- Pura Vida (2021)
- Are You B-O-R-E-D? (2025)

=== Extended plays ===
- Human (2015)
- Like It Is (2017)
- Who Cares (2018)
- Reimagined, Volume. 1 (2025)

=== Singles ===
- Alive (2015)
- Power Lines (2016)
- Give Me a Chance (2017)
- Headaches (2017)
- Bring Me Down (2018)
- Hangman (2018)
- Over Your Love (2018)
- Teardrop (2019)
- Choke (2020)
- Disconnect (2021)
- A Letter to Death (Reimagined) (2022)
- Blah Blah Blah (2024)
- Freefall (2024)
- B-O-R-E-D (2024)
- Rare (2024)
- Save Yourself (2024)
