= Artio (band) =

English alternative rock band

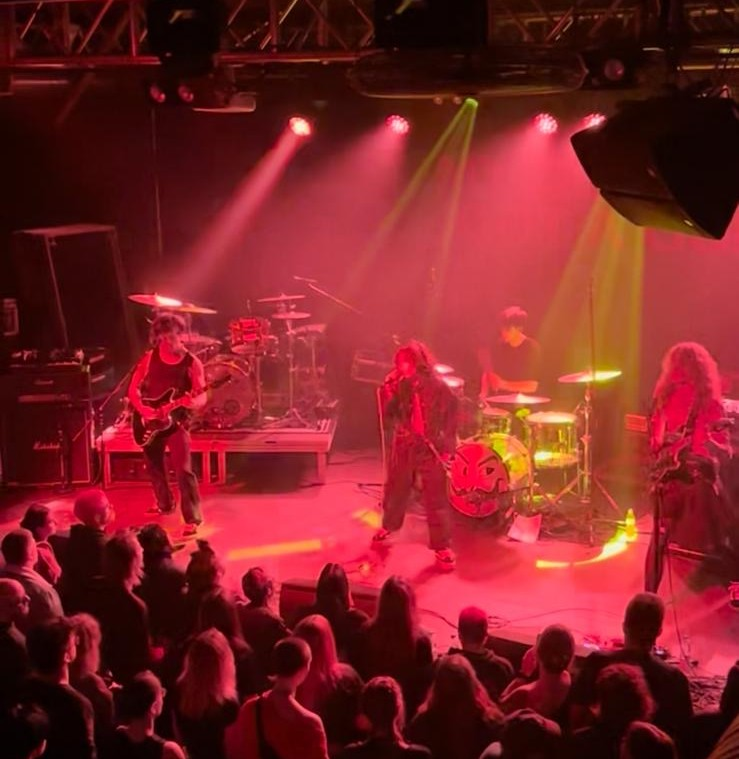
- Artio Backstage Halle, Munich, Germany 22 Feb 2025

Background information
- Origin: Leeds, West Yorkshire, England
- Genres: Pop rock; electronic rock; alternative rock
- Years active: 2018–present
- Labels: Slam Dunk; LAB
- Members: Rae Brazill; Ieuan Jones; Rob Arkle; Jai Akhurst
- Website: artiomusic.com

Artio are an English rock band from Leeds, West Yorkshire, formed in 2018. The group consists of vocalist Rae Brazill, guitarist Rob Arkle, guitarist Jai Akhurst, and bassist Ieuan Jones. The band is self-produced and has released two studio albums, Babyface (2024) and Soul Rot (2026), along with several EPs.

== History ==
Artio was founded in 2018 by vocalist Rae Brazill and bassist Ieuan Jones, who met through Leeds’ local music scene. In 2019, guitarist Rob Arkle joined the lineup. The band's debut single, "All Things End," was released on 5 June 2020, followed by "Hell’s Door" in September that year. These tracks were later featured on their debut EP Stand Alone and Do Your Dance, released on 18 September 2020.

In 2021, the band issued a two-part EP series: Shapeshifter: As Above (June) and Shapeshifter: So Below (November), further developing their blend of rock and electronic textures.

Later that year, Artio connected with guitarist Jai Akhurst, who began playing as a session member before joining permanently in October 2022.

The band signed to Slam Dunk Records in 2022 and released their EP Pyrokid in 2023, which included the single "Pyrokid", which the band performed live on BBC Introducing in March 2023

=== 2024: Babyface and touring ===
Between July 2023 and January 2024, Artio released four singles from their debut album Babyface, earning more radio play on BBC Introducing.

The full Babyface album was released on 1 March 2024 via Slam Dunk Records. That year, Artio signed to CAA and joined multiple UK tours, supporting acts such as South Arcade, As December Falls, Lake Malice and Honey Revenge. They performed at several festivals including Slam Dunk Festival, 2000trees, and Burn It Down, where they opened the main stage.

=== 2025/2026: Expanded touring and new material ===
Artio featured in the Kerrang article The Sound Of 2025: The new artists breaking the boundaries of alternative music and in early 2025 toured the UK and mainland Europe with Vukovi and Unpeople, playing high-profile venues such as the O2 Forum Kentish Town and O2 Ritz Manchester.

On 18 April 2025, Artio featured on the track "Turn Back to Me" by As It Is, part of the reissue Never Happy, Ever After X.

In May 2025, the band released "Split Soul" as a standalone single, accompanied by a music and behind-the-scenes footage. The track featured as Alyx Holcombe's Track of the Week on BBC Introducing Rock and is set to feature in the soundtrack of the upcoming video game Carnival Bizarre, developed by Studio Kryptid

On 18 May 2025, the band announced their signing to Lab Records. The following day, they were featured on Blurryface Reborn, a tribute album to Twenty One Pilots' Blurryface issued by Rocksound. Artio's contribution was a cover of "Hometown," which incorporated ambient field recordings from Leeds

In the summer of 2025, Artio appeared at The Great Escape Festival, Radar Festival, Rock for People Download Festival and appeared on the BBC Introducing stage at Reading and Leeds Festival

On 25 August 2025 Artio announced they had re-recorded and remastered their first three EP's and released these as a new compilation entitled Shapeshifted via LAB records. This was followed by the release of three singles; "The Devil You Know" (featuring Cody Frost) on 17 September, "Let it Be a Void" on 29 October and "Seven Suns" (featuring Kahal) on 29 November 2025. All 3 singles have accompanying music videos and feature on their second album Soul Rot, released on 21 January 2026.

In June 2026 Artio were announced as a finalist for "Best UK Breakthrough Artist" by The Heavy Music Awards an award later won by President.

== Musical style and themes ==
Critics have categorised Artio's music as pop rock, electronic rock and alternative rock.

Their lyrics often explore themes such as identity, emotional and personal challenges of growth and change, recovering from trauma and queer rage. The band is known for creating conceptual and multimedia projects, notably "The Babyface Saga," which includes a comic book released alongside their 2024 album.

With the release of Soul Rot in 2026, Artio continued to develop a musical style incorporating melodic song writing, heavy breakdowns, and contrasting restrained passages. The album was self-produced and features vocal performances that emphasise emotional expression. The lyrics address themes including resistance to algorithm-driven creativity and online abuse, as well as identity, trans joy, vulnerability, and self-acceptance.

They have cited influences including Bring Me the Horizon, Pvris, Muse, Billie Eilish and Static Dress.

== Members ==
- Rae Brazill – lead vocals, lyrics (2018–present)
- Ieuan Jones – drums, production (2018–present)
- Rob Arkle – lead guitar (2019–present)
- Jai Akhurst – rhythm guitar (2022–present)

== Discography ==
=== Albums ===
Title	Album details
Babyface	Released: 1 March 2024; Format: CD, Vinyl, Digital, Streaming; Label: Slam Dunk Records
Shapeshifted	Shapeshifted is a remaster and rerelease of Artio's first three EPs: Re-released: 25 August 2025; Format: Digital, Streaming; Label: LAB
Soul Rot	Released 21 January 2026; Format: CD, Vinyl, Digital, Streaming; Label: LAB

=== EPs ===
Title	Details
Stand Alone and Do Your Dance	Released: 18 September 2020; Format: Digital, Streaming, CD
Shapeshifter: As Above	Released: 4 June 2021; Format: Digital, Streaming
Shapeshifter: So Below	Released: 12 November 2021; Format: Digital, Streaming
Pyrokid	Released: 5 May 2023; Format: Digital, Streaming; Label: Slam Dunk Records

=== Selected singles ===
Title	Year	Album
"All Things End"	2020	Stand Alone and Do Your Dance
"Hell's Door"	2020	Stand Alone and Do Your Dance
"Pyrokid"	2022	Pyrokid
"Babyface"	2024	Babyface
"Split Soul"	2025	Non-album single
"The Devil You Know" (feat. Cody Frost)	2025	Soul Rot
"Let it Be a Void"	2025	Soul Rot
"Seven Suns" (featuring Kahal)	2025	Soul Rot

=== Other appearances ===
Album	Track	Artist	Details
Never Happy, Ever After X	"Turn Back to Me" feat. Artio	As It is	Released: 18 April 2025; Format: Digital, Streaming, CD, LP; Label: Slam Dunk Records
Blurryface Reborn	"Hometown"	Various	Announced: 19 May 2025; Format: CD; Label: Rocksound Magazine
Day of Iva	"Day of Iva"	Beauty School	Announced: 14 June 2025; Format: Digital, Streaming; Label: Slam Dunk Records

=== Non-music releases ===
Title	Media
The Babyface Saga (2024)	Comic Book

== Tours ==
=== Headlining ===
- Soul Rot - UK (March 2026; six shows)
- Babyface "In Full" - UK (2024; two shows)

=== Supporting ===
- Yonaka - European Tour (2026; six shows)
- As It Is - Never Happy Ever Aftour - UK Tour (2025; five shows)
- Vukovi - European Tour (2025; fifteen shows)
- Honey Revenge - UK Tour (2024; three shows)
- Mothica - UK Tour (2024; three shows)
- Lake Malice - UK Tour (2024; four shows)
- As December Falls - UK Tour (2024; six shows)
