= WSTR =

WSTR may refer to:

- WSTR (band), British pop punk band
- WSTR (FM) ("Star 94"), a radio station (94.1 FM) licensed to Smyrna, Georgia, United States
- WSTR-TV, MyNetworkTV's affiliate television station (channel 18, virtual 64) licensed to Cincinnati, Ohio, United States
