= Wallflower (band) =

English rock band

- Origin: South London, England
- Genres: Emo; soft grunge; alternative rock
- Years active: 2014–2020; 2026
- Members: Vinicius Moreira-Yeoell; Jake Reburn; Sam Woolley; Will Slane; Charlie Pollard
- Past members: Harley Clifton

Wallflower is an English rock band from South London. Formed in 2014 by Vinicius Moreira-Yeoell (vocals/guitar), Jake Reburn (guitar), Sam Woolley (guitar), Will Slane (bass) and Harley Clifton (drums), they released their debut EP Summer Daze later that year. On their second EP Where It Fell Apart, they began to incorporate elements of electronic and industrial music, such as synthesisers and sampling. By 2020, they were one of the forefront bands in British emo. Wallflower disbanded soon after the release of their debut album Teach Yourself to Swim (2020). They reunited in 2026.

== History ==
Wallflower were formed in South London in 2014. On 20 October 2014, they released their debut EP Summer Daze. In late 2015, original drummer Harley Clifton left the band and was replaced by Charlie Pollard. Between 11 and 19 February 2016, they toured toured the United Kingdom with Weatherstate. In February 2016, they performed at So Punk festival. On 31 March, they released the single "Sleep Forever". Between 1 and 6 April, they headlined a tour of mainland Europe. Between 2 and 10 July, they toured England alongside Yearbook. On 25 March 2017, the release show for Guillotine's EP Sapphire, alongside Gun Shy. Between 7 and 13 June, they toured the UK supporting Knuckle Puck. On 5 July, they performed at Fallow Cafe in Manchester alongside Simmer, Leatherneck and Yearbook. Between 11 and 14 August, they supported Dearist on their UK headline tour. Between 3 and 11 March, they toured the United Kingdom with Decade and Big Spring.

On 27 July 2017, they released the single "Splintered". Between 27 July and 5 August, they toured the UK supporting Milk Teeth alongside Employed to Serve. At the time of the tour, Already Heard writer, Sêan Reid described them as "on the cusp of becoming one of the UK’s best new bands". They performed at 2017 Download Festival. and 2017 2000 Trees. On 18 August 2017, they released their second EP Where It Fell Apart. Between 25 and 29 October, they co-headlined a tour of England with Muskets. Between 14 and 21 November, they supported the Movielife on their UK headline tour. On 31 December, they released a music video for "My Words (Borrowed)" from Where It Fell Apart. Between 21 and 29 September 2018, They opened for Boston Manor on their UK headline tour, alongside Microwave and Drug Church. They performed at Slam Dunk Festival 2019.

On 23 March 2020, they announced that their debut album Teach Yourself To Swim would be released on 5 June, and released its first single "Hungry Eyes". On 15 April, they released the single "Eat Away At My Heart" and an accompanying music video. On 6 May, they released the single "Passer-by" and an accompanying music video. During lockdown, the band launched a series of covers on their YouTube channel, including songs Coldplay by Bon Iver, as well as a video podcast, where they interviewed Funeral for a Friend vocalist Kris Coombs-Roberts. On 28 May 2020, they released a music video for the single "Further Down". The video focused on the progression of a swimming pool in South Croydon.

On 28 February 2026, they performed their first live performance since 2019. It was held at London venue The Lexington.

== Musical style and legacy ==
Critics categorised Wallflower's music as emo grunge, emo and alternative rock. They made use of elements of grunge and jazz music.

Their music incorporates emotional vocal melodies "dreamlike" vocal tones anthemic choruses, contrasting clean choruses and dirty verses They emphasis on guitar textures, making frequent use of guitar effects units, particularly using EarthQuaker Devices' Rainbow Machine pedal, as well as fuzz. Their Songs are often based around dynamics. Some of their songs incorporate spoken-word. Around 2017, they began to incorporate heavier elements into their sound. "very unique music style that I don’t think I’ve really heard in a lot of the pop punk/grunge scene." Particularly incorporating sampling, sythnesisers and elements of industrial music on Where It Fell Apart (2017).

Wallflower have cited influences including Sonic Youth, Weezer, the Pixies, Green Day, Thrice, Manchester Orchestra, Radiohead, Paramore, Queens of the Stone Age and a style Moreira-Yeoell referred to as "alt-rock-emo". Distort Sound writer James Weaver called their sound a mix of "retro alternative influences" and "modern classics" such as Paramore and Radiohead.

2020 articles by NME and The Independent credited them as a forefront band of emo's "next wave", at the same time, RockZone magazine called them prominent representatives of the "UK alternative scene".

== Discography ==
Studio albums

- Teach Yourself to Swim (2020)

EPs

- Summer Daze (2014)
- Where It Fell Apart (2017)

== Members ==
- Vinicius Moreira-Yeoell – vocals, guitar (2014–2020; 2026–present)
- Jake Reburn – guitar (2014–2020; 2026–present)
- Sam Woolley – guitar (2014–2020; 2026–present)
- Will Slane – bass (2014–2020; 2026–present)
- Harley Clifton – drums (2014–2015)
- Charlie Pollard – drums (2015–2020; 2026–present)
