= WSTR (band) =

English pop punk band

- Origin: Liverpool, England
- Genre: Pop punk
- Years active: 2015–present
- Labels: No Sleep Records (2015–2017); Hopeless (2018–2021); Life or Death Records (2021–present)
- Members: Sammy Clifford; Alex Tobijanski; Phil Wynne; Sean Carson; Bam Roberts
- Past members: Kieren McVeigh; Conor O'Hare; Kieran Alder; Jason Blackburn; Danny Swift; Andy Makin; Tom "Boots" Hawke
- Website: www.wstrband.co.uk

WSTR is an English pop punk band based in Liverpool, England. Their current lineup consists of Sammy Clifford (vocals), Alex Tobijanski (bass), Phil Wynne (guitar), Bam Roberts (guitar) and Sean Carson (drums). They are currently signed to Life or Death Records, after previously being signed to No Sleep Records and Hopeless Records.

== History ==
=== Formation and SKRWD EP (2015) ===
Formed in 2015, the band signed with No Sleep Records and released its first single, "Graveyard Shift", in March, of which the music video included cameos from members of Neck Deep. Following this, WSTR played at the Pinky Swear Records Fest in Manchester on 2 May, headlined by Man Overboard, and at Furyfest in Liverpool on 3 May, also playing at the Empire Festival in Sheffield on 17 May. WSTR played at the Jump On Demand Records Festival, also in Liverpool, later that June, the Hevy Fest in Port Lympne, Kent, and the Make A Scene Festival in Middlesbrough, North Yorkshire, in August.

The band's first EP, SKRWD, was released on 4 September. It was produced and recorded by Seb Barlow, at Celestial Recordings. They then played at the Hype Fest in Birmingham on 28 November. In December, WSTR was nominated for Best British Newcomer by Rock Sound, with Boston Manor winning the category.

=== Red, Green Or Inbetween (2016-2017) ===
In early 2016, the band was included in Kerrang!'s Class of 2016 list. Drummer Kieren McVeigh was replaced by Conor O'Hare, with McVeigh being informed that the band would be moving on without him by their manager. WSTR then played a headline show in London with Homebound and Six Time Champion, followed by the Less Than Three Festival in Derby, and opened for Neck Deep on the European leg of their World Tour, with Creeper. Later in July, they played the 2000Trees Festival at Upcote Farm in Cheltenham, Gloucestershire. They released a single, "Lonely Smiles", from their upcoming album in September.

In support of the first album, the band went on its first headlining tour, "The Inbetween Tour", from October to November 2016, with support from Milestones, also playing at the Slam Dunk Festival. During this time, the band recorded an acoustic version of the album's second single, "Footprints", which was made available on a "name your price" basis on their Bandcamp page. They additionally opened for Roam on a UK/Ireland tour in support of the album, Backbone, and released a third single, "Featherweight". The band also replaced drummer Conor O'Hare with Andy Makin (becoming an official member before their following tour).

On 20 January 2017, WSTR released its first full-length album, Red, Green or Inbetween. Shortly after, the band announced lead guitarist Kieran Alder's departure due to personal differences, being replaced by Jason Blackburn. The band then supported Seaway on a UK tour, with The Gospel Youth, and returned to Slam Dunk later that summer. WSTR also played at the Truck Festival at Hill Farm in Oxfordshire, the Reading and Leeds Festivals, the Deadbolt Festival in Manchester and the 2Q Festival in Lincoln, as well as opening for With Confidence on an Australian tour. Lead guitarist Jason Blackburn then left the band before the band's final tour of the year, with the band remaining as a four-piece live thereafter.

=== Signing to Hopeless Records and Identity Crisis (2018) ===
On 4 June 2018, the band announced that it was signing with Hopeless Records. Rhythm guitarist Danny Swift then announced his departure from the band due to personal reasons, having not toured with them earlier in the year. Swift was then officially replaced by the band's guitar tech Tom "Boots" Hawkes. The band then played a set at the Download Festival in the UK. WSTR opened for As It Is on several legs of the okay. tour, first in Europe with Courage My Love and then in the UK with Like Pacific and Grayscale. On 31 August, a second LP was released, Identity Crisis, which was led by the singles "Bad to the Bone", "Crisis" and "Silly Me". To support its release, the band joined Neck Deep on the second North American leg of The Peace and the Panic Tour with Trophy Eyes and Stand Atlantic, and went on a headlining UK tour with Between You & Me and Hey Charlie. Drummer Andy Makin then left the band at the end of the year.

=== "Filthy", Give Yourself a Hell and SKRWD: Reimagined EPs, "All The Rage" (2019-2021) ===
In early 2019, WSTR went on tour again as the supporting act for The Faim's UK tour. A cover EP titled Give Yourself a Hell was released, with cover versions of "Give Yourself a Try" by The 1975 and "Gives You Hell" by The All-American Rejects, and played a third Slam Dunk Festival that summer. In autumn, WSTR embarked on the full run of The Noise & Ones to Watch Presents Stand Atlantic and The Faim Co-Headline U.S. Tour, with fellow openers Hold Close and Point North playing on select dates. While on tour, they released a new song, "Filthy".

On 25 November, WSTR set out on a headlining UK tour, starting in Brighton and ending in Nottingham on 8 December. They then joined Grayscale, Hot Mulligan and LURK on the Nella Vita North American Tour: Part II, being accompanied by touring drummer Jeff Nichols.

On 14 August 2020, WSTR released new versions of two previous songs, "Ain't Great" and "South Drive", from their first EP SKRWD on an EP titled SKRWD: Reimagined.

The band was later listed as free agents following their split with Hopeless Records towards the end of 2020. In early 2021, WSTR released the non-album single "All The Rage".

=== Signing to LIFE OR DEATH and ‘Til the Wheels Fall Off (2021-2024) ===
In late 2021, WSTR announced they had signed a record deal with Life or Death Records and released the single "JOBBO" shortly after.

The band would return at a sold out all-day festival, Twisted Summer Jam, in July 2022 alongside Trash Boat in Doncaster, United Kingdom. This show would be the introduction of new guitarist Phil Wynne (replacing Boots, who left the band to work full-time as a guitar tech for various bands) and new drummer Sean Carson.

On 28 October 2022 a new single “Bot Lobby” was released from an upcoming album due for release in 2023. This was then followed by a headline UK tour starting with a sold out show at the Night & Day in Manchester. Concluding with a hometown show in Liverpool on 19 November 2022.

On 27 January 2023, the band released another new single, titled “3 Days Sober”.

In March 2023, the band announced their long-awaited third album, titled ‘Til the Wheels Fall Off’, accompanied by the release of the album's title track as a single. A further two singles (‘Poor Boy’ & ‘Until Then’) were released along with a 7-day headline UK tour planned for September. 'Til the Wheels Fall Off was released worldwide via Life or Death Records on 26 May 2023.

After a year-long hiatus, the band went on a 3-day headline UK tour in September 2024.

=== Bare Bones and "Live Laugh Toaster Bath" (2025-Present) ===
In April 2025, WSTR announced their EP Bare Bones, featuring acoustic renditions of songs from Red, Green Or Inbetween and 'Til the Wheels Fall Off. The EP was officially released on 18 July 2025.

The band celebrated 10 years since the release of their debut EP SKRWD with a headline UK tour in September 2025, being accompanied by touring lead guitarist Bam Roberts. Former drummer and founding member Kieren McVeigh made a one-off appearance during the Manchester show to play "Graveyard Shift". WSTR went on another headline tour in Mainland Europe in February 2026 with CF98.

On 13 February 2026, the band released the single "Live Laugh Toaster Bath" with a music video.

Sammy Clifford also featured in the song "To Hold You On The Moon" made for the game Wuthering Waves. This was for Wuthering Waves' version 3.4 collaboration with Cyberpunk: Edgerunners.

On 20 November 2026, the band released the single "Half a Chance" with a music video, with Bam Roberts joining the band full-time as lead guitarist.

== Name ==
Originally named Waster, the group discovered a band with the same name from Canada. Because both bands were selling under the same name on iTunes, the Canadian band issued a "cease and desist" letter. The group ultimately decided to keep the most similar name as possible, removing the vowels, leaving simply WSTR.

== Musical style and influences ==
WSTR is generally credited as a pop punk band. The group's lead singer, Sammy Clifford, has said that many of his musical influences were from the United States, including Blink-182 and New Found Glory. Clifford's vocal style has evolved noticeably across the band's discography, transitioning from raw, grittier delivery in their earlier releases to a more refined, cleaner tone in later material, reflecting both his growth as a vocalist and the band's broaded musical development. The band has often drawn comparisons to Neck Deep, largely due to the similar vocal styles of Clifford and Neck Deep's frontman Ben Barlow. The resemblance is likely attributed to Clifford's long-standing friendship and early collaborations with Barlow and his brother Seb (Neck Deep's bassist), who produced WSTR's discography up until 2019.

== Band members ==
Current

- Sammy Clifford – lead vocals (2015–present)
- Alex Tobijanski – bass guitar (2015–present)
- Phil Wynne – rhythm guitar (2022–present)
- Sean Carson – drums (2022–present)
- Bam Roberts - lead guitar, occasional vocals (2026-present, touring 2025-2026)

Former

- Kieren McVeigh – drums (2015–2016)
- Kieran Alder – lead guitar (2015–2017)
- Danny Swift – rhythm guitar, backing vocals (2015-2017)
- Conor O'Hare – drums (2016)
- Jason Blackburn – lead guitar (2017)
- Tom "Boots" Hawkes – rhythm guitar, backing vocals (2018-2021)

Touring

- Gavin Sullivan – drums (2019)
- Jeff Nichols – drums (2020)
- Neil Morris – bass guitar (2023)

Timeline

== Discography ==
Studio albums

- Red, Green Or Inbetween (2017)
- Identity Crisis (2018)
- 'Til the Wheels Fall Off (2023)

EPs

- SKRWD (2015)
- Give Yourself a Hell (2019)
- SKRWD: Reimagined (2020)
- Bare Bones (2025)

Singles

- "Graveyard Shift" (2015)
- "Fair Weather" (2015)
- "Lonely Smiles" (2016)
- "Footprints" (2016)
- "Footprints (Acoustic)" (2016)
- "Bad To The Bone" (2018)
- "Crisis" (2018)
- "Silly Me" (2018)
- "Filthy" (2019)
- "All the Rage" (2021)
- "JOBBO" (2021)
- "Bot Lobby" (2022)
- ”3 Days Sober” (2023)
- ”Til The Wheels Fall Off” (2023)
- ”Poor Boy” (2023)
- ”Until Then” (2023)
- "3 DAYS SOBER (Acoustic)" (2025)
- "JOBBO (Acoustic)" (2025)
- "UNTIL THEN (Acoustic)" (2025)
- "EASTBOUND AND DOWN (Acoustic)" (2025)
- "Live Laugh Toaster Bath" (2026)
- "Half a Chance" (2026)

Music videos

- "Graveyard Shift" (2015)
- "Fair Weather" (2015)
- "Lonely Smiles" (2016)
- "Footprints" (2016)
- "Eastbound & Down" (2017)
- "Bad to the Bone" (2018)
- "Crisis" (2018)
- "Live Laugh Toaster Bath" (2026)
- "Half a Chance" (2026)

Featured Music

- Misplaced - "Tom in 03" (2023)
- Well Played - "FAKE FRIENDS" (2024)
- Inconsistent Me - "POSER" (2025)
- Royals - "Good For Me" (2025)
- CF98 - "NOBODY WANTS TO PARTY" (2025)
- trxvis - "CHEAT CODE" (2025)
- downcast - "home" (2025)
- Double XP - "All A Game" (2026)
- PARTICLE - "DIZZY" (2026)
