= Hopeless Records =

American record label

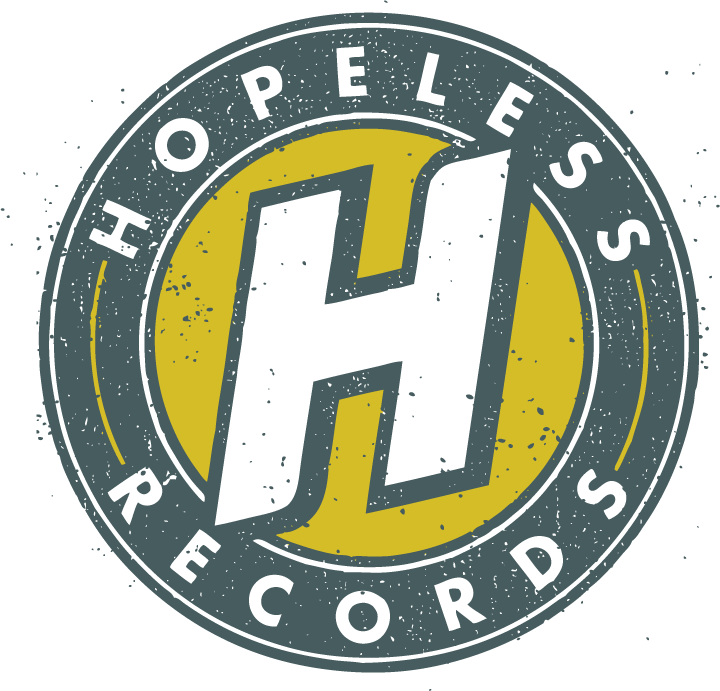
- Founded: 1993; 33 years ago
- Founder: Louis Posen
- Distributor: AMPED Distribution
- Genre: Post-hardcore; pop-punk; hardcore punk; emo; alternative rock; screamo; punk rock; melodic hardcore; metalcore; heavy metal
- Country of origin: U.S.
- Location: Van Nuys, California
- Official website: hopelessrecords.com

Hopeless Records is an American independent record label in Van Nuys, California.

== History ==
Hopeless Records was founded in 1993 by Louis Posen. The label's artists are generally considered to fall under the genres of punk rock, pop punk, post-hardcore, and alternative rock, but some also include elements of heavy metal. Some of their best-known artists include All Time Low, Sum 41, Neck Deep, Avenged Sevenfold, Thrice, Yellowcard, Anarbor, Taking Back Sunday, Silverstein, Amber Pacific, We Are the In Crowd, Bayside, the Used, the Wonder Years, the Human Abstract Enter Shikari, and Michael Clifford.

In July 2008, Hopeless Records announced that it had launched a new imprint, P Is for Panda. It was originally started in 2007 as a clothing line by The Militia Group founder Chad Pearson. The P Is For Panda label released its first album, a various artists compilation in August 2008.

In 2025, Hopeless Records purchased the Fat Wreck Chords back catalog and operations. Previous owners Fat Mike and Erin Burkett retain certain aspects of the label, including the Fat Wreck trademark which is licensed to Hopeless Records for physical and digital releases.

== Notable artists ==
=== Current ===
- Bayside
- Fame on Fire
- Illuminati Hotties
- Michael Clifford
- Neck Deep
- Noahfinnce
- Pinkshift
- Pvris
- Scene Queen
- Sincere Engineer
- Stand Atlantic
- Sullivan King
- Sweet Pill
- Tigers Jaw
- The Toxhards
- Trash Boat
- Trophy Eyes
- Vaines
- Wargasm
- What's Eating Gilbert

=== Past ===
- 88 Fingers Louie (active)
- Aaron West and the Roaring Twenties (active)
- Against All Authority (active)
- Air Dubai (status unknown)
- All Time Low (active with Basement Noise/Photo Finish Records)
- Amber Pacific (active with Manic Kat Records)
- Anarbor (active)
- Anthony Raneri (active with Equal Vision Records)
- Atom And His Package (active)
- Avenged Sevenfold (active with Warner Records)
- Between You & Me (independent)
- Circa Survive (hiatus)
- Coldrain (active with Warner Music Japan)
- Common Rider (status unknown)
- Cruel Hand (status unknown)
- Damion Suomi and the Minor Prophets (status unknown)
- The Dangerous Summer (active with Rude Records)
- Destroy Boys (active)
- Digger (active again as of 2015)
- Dillinger Four (active with Fat Wreck Chords)
- Doll Skin (disbanded)
- Driver Friendly (status unknown)
- Emarosa (active with Out of Line Music)
- Enter Shikari (independent)
- Ever We Fall (disbanded)
- Fifteen (disbanded)
- Foxing
- Funeral Oration (disbanded)
- Grabbitz (active with Monstercat Records)
- Guttermouth (active with Rude Records)
- Hands Like Houses (active, independent)
- Have Mercy (active again as of 2022)
- Heckle (disbanded)
- Hey Violet (disbanded)
- The Human Abstract (disbanded)
- Hundredth (status unknown)
- Jeff Ott (status unknown)
- Kaddisfly (active with Hopeless subsidiary Sub City Records)
- Lotus Eater (disbanded)
- LØLØ (active with Fearless Records)
- Mêlée (status unknown)
- Milk Teeth (disbanded)
- Moose Blood (hiatus)
- Mustard Plug (active with Bad Time Records)
- New Found Glory (active with Pure Noise Records)
- Nural (disbanded)
- Oh, Weatherly (disbanded)
- The Queers (active with Cleopatra Records)
- The Ready Set (status unknown)
- ROAM (disbanded)
- Samiam (active with Pure Noise Records)
- Satanic Surfers (active)
- Scared of Chaka (status unknown)
- Selby Tigers (disbanded)
- Silverstein (active with UNFD)
- Somos (status unknown)
- Story Untold (actively independent)
- Sum 41 (disbanded)
- SycAmour (status unknown)
- Sylar (status unknown)
- Taking Back Sunday (active with Fantasy Records)
- There for Tomorrow (disbanded)
- Thrice (active with Epitaph Records)
- Tiny Moving Parts (independent)
- Tonight Alive (status unknown)
- Travie McCoy
- The Used (active with Big Noise Records)
- Waterparks (independent)
- We Are The In Crowd (active)
- With Confidence (disbanded)
- The Wonder Years (active)
- WSTR (active)
- Yellowcard (active with Better Noise Music)

== See also ==
- List of record labels
