= Me Vs Hero =

British rock band

- Origin: Blackpool, Lancashire, England, United Kingdom
- Genres: Pop punk, easycore, melodic hardcore, metalcore
- Years active: 2007–2015
- Labels: Hang In Records; Hang Tight Records; Punktastic Recordings
- Past members: Sam Thompson; Michael Booth; Bobby Pook; Grant Berry; Simon Smith; Alex McCulloch; Oliver Bradley; Stephen Jones; Ross Malpass

Me Vs Hero were a British rock band from Blackpool, Lancashire, England. The band consisted of lead vocalist Sam Thompson, bassist Michael Booth, guitarists Bobby Pook and Grant Berry and drummer Simon Smith. The band were known for their inclusion of hardcore punk and heavy metal influences to complement their pop punk sound. The band their self-titled EP in January 2009, followed by a second EP release entitled This One's for Our Friend in December 2009, and the following year the band released their debut album Days That Shape Our Lives.

On 25 April 2014 it was announced that they are releasing their second album, I'm Completely Fine later this fall. They also released a new single to coincide with the announcement entitled "Marks of a Slave".

On 18 February 2015, Me Vs Hero announced they were splitting up.

They held a reunion tour for Slam Dunk Festival UK in late May 2018.

== Formation, early years and Days That Shape Our Lives (2007–2011) ==
The band formed in 2007 with Alex McCulloch, Sam Thompson, Oliver Bradley and Michael Booth. Sam and Mike, whom were best friends since secondary school, used to practice in Sam's garage. The band started when vocalist Sam Thompson wrote two demo songs: hand me the keys to massey and spiceweasel bam and then showed them to the other three. The band's name is when Alex McCulloch was listening to Walls of Jericho and misinterpreted the lyrics as being beast versus hero. The band played their first gig in Blackpool at a small venue called Riffs.

In August 2008 the band declared that founding guitarist Alex McCulloch died. The band has stated that their continuation was "to pay tribute to Alex". The band chose old friend Ross Malpass, who is also a successful web and app designer, as their new guitarist.

In 2009 they released two Extended plays: Me Vs Hero EP in January and This One's for Our Friend In December. The band toured with several bands that year, completing a co-headline tour with Paige in March, festival appearances at Slam Dunk and Sonisphere.

The band's debut album Days That Shape Our Lives was released 18 October 2010. The album used re-recorded songs from their first two extended plays, this was because the band decided on—in their opinion—the best songs on the two EPs and wanted to show them to a larger audience. Following up to the release of the album three music videos were generated from the album, the title track 'The Days That Shape Our Lives', 'Can You Count, Suckers?' And later in 2012 'My Warren Sense Is Tingling'. On 6 October 2010 the band made the album free to stream on the internet. In November the band complete their first tour in support of the album by supporting Deaf Havana across Britain. On 6 December Me Vs Hero signed to Hang Tight Records to release the album on 12″ vinyl. Thee vinyl press was limited to 500 copies; 100 on blue/green splatter and 400 on green.

In early 2011 Oliver Bradley was replaced by Stephen Jones on the drums. Bradley's reasons were never specified, only that he no longer wanted to be a part of the band any more. This was a coincidence as Jones' previous band had just broken up and he was looking to join another band. Across 2011 the band supported Skindred across the United Kingdom. As well as made several festival appearances including: Relentless Boardmasters, Slam Dunk, Sonisphere Festival and Hevy Music Festival. At their Sonisphere Festival at Knebworth they confirmed themselves for the festival's secret performance at "the Roadhouse" in Manchester on 14 July, the show was designed to raise funds for the Teenage Cancer Trust.

In early 2012 Stephen Jones left the band and they invited Simon Smith to join as their new drummer. However Smith initially rejected the offer as he was a session drummer for an X-factor finalist. Three days later, Smith joined the band.

== Second studio album (2012–2015) ==
The band spent a majority of 2012 writing and recording their second studio album, the band posted a teaser of their work on the album to the internet in its early stages in March. In June Me Vs Hero, With The Punches, and Heroes For Hire completed their 5 date "Beyond the Blue" tour of Japan. Then appeared with Kids Can't Fly at the Middlesbrough-based Make A Scene Festival and at the UK Warped Tour at the Alexandra Palace in London, and co-headline tour of the United Kingdom alongside With The Punches in December 2012.

On 19 November 2012 the band released a short video through Rock Sound Magazine introducing the album and showing footage of its recording, and later, on 26 November 2012 the band debuted a live-studio recording of a new song Heisenberg through Drop Dead Clothing. The band has also confirmed that a mystery "tattooed gentleman" guest vocalist appears on the album.

The band toured the East Coast of the United States in February 2013. During May 2013 the band played at all 3 dates of the 2013 Slam Dunk Festival as well supporting Polar Bear Club on their U.K tour

On 25 April, they revealed the title of their upcoming album I'm Completely Fine, which is slated to be released later this year. They also released a new song called "Marks of a Slave".

On 2 June 2014 the band released a second single off of their upcoming album called "Things We Know".

On 6 August 2014 a programmer released a sneak preview of what appeared to be a Video Game for the album. No other information was provided and the band have not said made any statements. On the Facebook post band members are tagged. It is expected to be officially announced later in August 2014.

== Musical style and influences ==
Me vs Hero is seen by critics as being a pop punk band inspired by both hardcore punk and heavy metal bands. Thompson has gone on record saying he has never had an issue with the tag, saying: "So many bands go under the umbrella of pop-punk that you call someone pop-core or easy-core you know it’s something like pop-punk with beatdowns."

The band's debut album, Days That Shape Our Lives, showcases the bands typically positive lyrics. The upbeat energy of the album is a result of the excitement they felt as they formed the band. Songs like the single "Can You Count, Suckers?" are described as an "unstoppable blend of pop-punk and hardcore" and as "pure modern pop-punk". The positivity of the album is halted by the acoustic ballad 'A Loss in the Ranks', which was written specifically about the death of founding member Alex McCulloch.

With the writing of the second album the band members have stated that it displays a more contrasting, broader range of styles, offering a more dynamic sound and that the "heavier bits are going to be heavier, and I think the poppier bits are going to be more poppy maybe". They have also considered the album as more of a group effort, so more diverse influences will come into their style. lyrically the albums is said by the band as sounding more "honest" and "more relatable" than its predecessor.

When singer Sam Thompson was asked to name three albums that made him want to be in a band he spoke about Dookie, Blink-182 and Take This to Your Grave. The band has been compared to Blink-182 and Fall Out Boy, Four Year Strong, New Found Glory, Set Your Goals and A Day to Remember.

== Members ==
Final lineup

- Sam Thompson – lead vocals (2007–2015)
- Michael Booth – bass guitar (2007–2015)
- Bobby Pook – guitar, backing vocals (2008–2015)
- Grant Berry – guitar (2012–2015)
- Simon Smith – drums (2012–2015)

Former members

- Alex McCulloch – guitar (2007–2008; deceased)
- Ross Malpass – guitar (2008–2012)
- Oliver Bradley – drums (2007–2011)
- Stephen Jones – drums (2011–2012)

== Discography ==
Studio albums

- Days That Shape Our Lives (2010)
- I'm Completely Fine (2014)

Extended Plays

- Me Vs Hero EP (2009)
- This One's for Our Friend (2009)

Compilations

- A Pop-Punk Summer (Alternativ News, 2011,) contributed "Can You Count, Suckers?"
