= The Hara =

British alternative rock band

THE HARA
- Origin: Manchester, England
- Genres: Alternative metal, alternative rock
- Years active: 2017–present
- Members: Josh Taylor; Zack Breen; Jack Kennedy
- Website: www.theharaband.com

The Hara (stylised as THE HARA) is an English rock band from Manchester. The band was formed by Josh Taylor (lead vocalist), Zack Breen (guitar), and Jack Kennedy (drums) in 2017.

== History ==
The band formed in 2017. Despite all attending BIMM: Manchester at the same time, the bandmates did not meet until after graduation.

The Hara released their first EP, No Regrets, in 2018. The band then spent nearly two years touring the United Kingdom, advocating for youth mental health and completing hundreds of performances to over 4850 fans. In 2019, THE HARA released two more EPs, Unconscious Minds Innocently Blind and Tramp Brain.

In April 2020, the Hara released their fourth EP, We Are the Movement. In September, they released their fifth EP, Play Dead, which hit No. 1 on the iTunes chart across all genres.

Due to the COVID-19 pandemic, and subsequently, the COVID-19 lockdowns in the United Kingdom, the Hara had to cancel numerous concert dates and festival performances. As an alternative, the Hara offered fans a virtual concert experience via live stream. Also during lockdown, THE HARA gained popularity on TikTok for their frequent and diverse posts, which included skits, song covers, and live performance clips. THE HARA went viral on the platform in 2021.

After restrictions on nightlife were lifted later on in 2021, the Hara rescheduled their tour and received critical acclaim for their numerous music festival performances including Download Festival, Reading and Leeds, Tramlines, and Slam Dunk. Their rescheduled 'Play Dead' tour kicked off in September and continued through November, with the majority of dates selling out.

In April 2022, the Hara released their sixth EP, We All Wear Black, which reached No. 3 on the UK Rock & Metal albums chart. The band also continued to perform at numerous music festivals in the UK and Europe, including Download Festival, The Great Escape, Rock for People, 2000trees, Y Not?, and others. In June 2022, the Hara released their first live concert CD/DVD, Live at Satan's Hollow, in collaboration with Cosmic Joke, a Manchester-based video production company.

The Hara made their live debut in the United States during SXSW in March 2023. Later, the band released their debut album, SURVIVAL MODE, in April via Scruff of the Neck. In support of this album, the Hara went on two tours in the UK and Europe, both with sold-out dates. In June, the Hara supported Sum 41 during the Rock For People official afterparty.

In February 2024, the band confirmed that their second studio album was forthcoming via social media. Throughout the year, THE HARA continued performing live in the UK and Europe, supporting both Ice Nine Kills and Escape the Fate on their respective UK tours. In July 2024, the Hara performed during the silent disco at 2000Trees.

In January 2026, The Hara released their second studio album, The Fallout, via Mascot Records. The band supported the album release with a two-month UK tour. In May 2026, The Hara released a collaboration with Ukrainian rock band The Hardkiss called "I Love You". The Hara's 2026 festival appearances include RADAR Festival, Magnata Festival, and Takedown Festival. The band will be ending the year with a winter tour in the UK and Europe.
