= Decade (band) =

British rock band

- Origin: Bath, England
- Genres: Alternative rock; pop-punk; pop rock
- Years active: 2009–2018
- Labels: Spinefarm Records; Slam Dunk; Rude Records
- Members: Alex Sears; Connor Fathers; Harry Norton; Joe Marriner
- Past members: Dan Clarke
- Website: decadeofficial.co.uk

Decade are a British rock band from Bath, England. Formed in 2009, the band consists of lead vocalist Alex Sears, guitarist Joe Marriner, guitarist and backing vocalist Connor Fathers and bassist Harry Norton. Encapsulated by the locution 'Loud quiet happy sad', Decade currently have two studio albums, Good Luck and Pleasantries, a self-titled EP as well as an EP they pretend does not exist.

Decade signed to Rude Records in late 2016. Their second studio album, Pleasantries, was released in 2017 to much acclaim across a number of independent publications.

== History ==
Formed in 2009, Decade operated under the appellation Ready Set Low. This was changed in 2011 shortly after the release of their first EP, Lost at Sea. The band began gaining traction in the UK festival scene, appearing for the first time at Slam Dunk Festival.

Their first studio album, Good Luck, was released in 2014 through Spinefarm Records. That same year, Decade toured with bands such as Deaf Havana, Saves the Day and Mayday Parade, and packed out the room during their appearance at Slam Dunk Festival on the MacBeth Stage across all three dates.

After a substantial break, Decade were welcomed back onto the music circuit with positive reception in 2017 following the release of Pleasantries. In the same year, they returned to Slam Dunk, Hit the Deck, and toured the UK and Europe with Counterfeit and Tigress.

The band played at the Borderline in London in May 2018, debuting a new song named "Keep Me". However, they have not released any new music since 2017 or played live since 2018, and their Twitter account has been inactive for some time.

== Band members ==
- Alex Sears - vocals
- Joe Marriner - guitar
- Connor Fathers - guitar, vocals
- Harry Norton - bass

Former members

- Dan Clarke - drums (left the band in October 2017)

Live dates in 2018 featured Charlie Pollard from the band Wallflower on drums.

== Discography ==
=== Extended plays ===
- Lost at Sea (2011) (Released under the band's previous denomination Ready Set Low)
- Decade (2013) - Spinefarm Records

=== Studio albums ===
- Good Luck (2014) - Spinefarm Records
- Pleasantries (2017) - Rude Records

=== Singles ===
"The Doctor Called (Turns Out I'm Sick as F**k)" (2011)

== Tours ==
=== 2011 ===
- March - D.R.U.G.S UK Tour w/ Blitz Kids
- May - Set Your Goals UK Tour w/ A Loss For Words and Our Time Down Here
- October - Forever The Sickest Kids UK Tour w/ Glamour Of The Kill and Action Item

=== 2012 ===
- February - UK Headline Tour
- May - Hit The Lights UK Tour w/ The Story So Far and Transit
- October/November - A Loss For Words UK Tour w/ Save Your Breath and Light You Up

=== 2013 ===
- March - UK Headline Tour w/ Light You Up
- April - Don Broco UK Tour w/ Pure Love
- July - Emily's Army (now SWMRS) UK Tour
- October - Tonight Alive UK Tour w/ Set It Off

=== 2014 ===
- January - Mayday Parade UK/Ireland Tour w/ Man Overboard and Divided By Friday
- April - Saves The Day Europe Tour
- May - UK Headline Tour w/ Only Rivals and Brawlers
- July - Lower Than Atlantis UK Tour w/ Yearbook
- September/October - UK Headline Tour w/ Light You Up and Hey Vanity
- October - We Are The Ocean UK Tour w/ Boy Jumps Ship
- November - A Day To Remember UK Tour w/ Lower Than Atlantis

=== 2015 ===
- February - The Used UK Tour w/ Landscapes
- April - UK Headline Tour w/ Scouts
- May - Set It Off UK and Europe Tour w/ Brawlers

=== 2016 ===
- May/June - UK Headline Tour w/ Cheap Meat

=== 2017 ===
- March - UK Headline Tour w/ Big Spring and Wallflower
- March/April - Counterfeit Europe Tour w/ Tigress
- October - You Me At Six Germany Tour w/ Flash Forward
- November/December - Deaf Havana UK and Germany Tour w/ Blackfoxxes
