= Jools (band) =

British punk band

- Origin: Leicester, England, United Kingdom
- Genres: Punk; noise rock; garage punk
- Years active: 2019–
- Label: Hassle Records
- Members: Mitchell Gordon; Kate Price; Chris Johnston; Chelsea Wrones; Emer McLaughlin
- Website: joolsbandjools.com

Jools is a British & Irish Punk band from Leicester. They are deeply rooted in punk, and have been compared to other genres such as rap, metal, shoegaze, and spoken word.

== History ==
Jools formed in Leicester in 2019. The band took their name "Jools" from Jools Holland, after they watched the band Shame, perform on Holland's late-night music show, Later... with Jools Holland.

The band describes their sound as being influenced by the Beat Generation movement, and describe bands such as The Cure, Pixies and The Streets as influences.

On 12 November 2019, Jools released their first single, "Hysterical Starving Naked". In describing the track, Ellie Howorth from LDOI said that the band takes "gritty punk vocals, and places them alongside roaring guitars, broad basslines and thrashing drums, crafting a pit-inducing heavy rock sound." Following the release of the single, Jools was compared to several post-punk and noise rock bands from the region, including IDLES, Shame, and Fontaines D.C.

In early 2020, Jools released their second single, "Spineless" on 27 March 2020, which was lauded by some critics for the pro-socialist lyrics. Matthew Brocklehurt, writing for When the Horn Blows called "Spineless" the band coming into their own.

Jools released “How Can Some Experience What Pride is Without Liberation For All?” on 18th September. The single was named “Rockest Record” that week on the BBC Radio One Rock Show by host, Daniel P Carter. Carter featured the track several times prominently thereafter and also supported the band's fourth single, “Cross-Dressing in a Freudian Slip” (released 27 November 2020).

After tours supporting Black Foxxes (late 2021) and Boston Manor (early 2022) around the UK, the band announced they had signed with Raw Power Management on 27 April 2022, the band played a number of shows that September as part of The National Lottery’s “Revive Live” tour. The band went in to support Hot Milk in February 2023.

On 27 March 2024, the band announced they had signed to Hassle Records. Their first single for the label, “97%”, was released on 5 April 2024; it was featured as Daniel P Carter's Tune of the Week on the Radio One Rock Show three days later. Hassle Records announced that “97%” would be released as a double A-side single with “FKA” digitally and on 7” vinyl on 21 June 2024. FKA was featured as Daniel P Carter's Tune of the Week on the Radio One Rock Show upon release.

== Discography ==
=== Singles ===
- "Hysterical Starving Naked" (2019)
- "Spineless" (2020)
- "How Can Some Experience What Pride Is Without Liberation for All" (2020)
- "Cross-Dressing in a Freudian Slip" (2020)
- ”97%” / “FKA” (2024)
- “Guts” (2025)
- “Mother Monica” (2025)
- “Live Deliciously” (2025)
- “Limerence” (2025)

=== Albums ===
- “Violent Delights” (2025)
