= Sweet Pill =

American emo band

- Origin: Glassboro, New Jersey, U.S.
- Genres: Emo; Midwest emo; punk rock
- Years active: 2018–present
- Labels: Hopeless Records; Topshelf Records; Know Hope Records
- Members: Zayna Youssef; Jayce Williams; Sean McCall; Ryan Cullen; Chris Kearney
- Past members: Stephen Kummer; Ian Bley; Jack Meidel; Tom Papaccio; Dylan Walker
- Website: sweetpill.net

Sweet Pill is a Philadelphia-based emo band founded in 2018. The band consists of vocalist Zayna Youssef, guitarist Jayce Williams, guitarist Sean McCall, bassist Ryan Cullen, and drummer Chris Kearney.

== History ==
Sweet Pill formed in 2018 as a senior project while Youssef and Williams were attending Rowan University in Glassboro, New Jersey. They were joined by Kearney a year and a half later. The band released their debut single "Doubt" in March 2019, and their first EP, Lost In It, followed one month later. Sweet Pill later moved to Philadelphia during the COVID-19 pandemic, playing their first show as a group with McCall and Cullen at the FDR Skatepark in May 2021.

In March 2022, the group announced their upcoming debut album while releasing its first single, "Blood". Sweet Pill released a second single from the album, "High Hopes", on April 6. The band released the third single from the album, "Diamond Eyes", a few weeks prior to the album's release. The album, Where the Heart Is, was released on May 25, 2022.

Between September and October 2022, Sweet Pill opened for post-hardcore band La Dispute on their US and Canada tour. On September 27, 2023, Sweet Pill signed to Hopeless Records and released a new single titled "Starchild".

== Band members ==
Current members

- Zayna Youssef – lead vocals (2018–present)
- Jayce Williams – guitar (2018–present)
- Chris Kearney – drums (2019–present)
- Sean McCall – guitar, backing vocals (2021–present)
- Ryan Cullen – bass (2021–present)

Former members

- Stephen Kummer – drums, bass (2018–2019)
- Ian Bley – bass, guitar, drums (2018–2019)
- Jack Meidel – guitar (2019–2020)
- Tom Papaccio – bass, backing vocals (2019–2020)
- Dylan Walker – bass (2020–2020)

== Discography ==
=== Studio albums ===
Full-length studio albums by Sweet Pill
| Title | Album details |
|---|---|
| Where the Heart Is | Released: May 25, 2022; Label: Topshelf Records; Format: Digital download, streaming, vinyl, cassette |

| Title | Album details |
|---|---|
| Still There's a Glow | Released: March 13, 2026; Label: Hopeless Records; Format: Digital download, streaming, vinyl, cassette |

=== Extended plays ===
Extended plays by Sweet Pill
| Title | Album details |
|---|---|
| Lost in It | Released: April 12, 2019; Format: Digital download |
| Sweet Pill on Audiotree Live | Released: November 29, 2022; Label: Audiotree; Format: Digital download, streaming |
| Starchild | Released: March 15, 2024; Label: Hopeless; Format: Digital download, streaming, vinyl, cassette |
| Unraveled | Released: January 31, 2025; Label: Hopeless; Format: Digital download, streaming |

=== Singles ===
- Doubt (March 6, 2019)
- Miss This/Tell Me (December 6, 2019; Know Hope Records)
- Best of Me (February 14, 2020; Know Hope Records)
- Swallow the Pill (March 13, 2020)
- Blood (March 9, 2022; Topshelf)
- High Hopes (April 6, 2022; Topshelf)
- Diamond Eyes (May 13, 2022; Topshelf)
- Starchild (September 27, 2023; Hopeless)
- The Medic (November 3, 2023)
- Chewed Up (December 6, 2023; Hopeless)
- Eternal (February 2, 2024; Hopeless)
- There, There (August 16, 2024; Hopeless)
- Cut (Unraveled) (December 13, 2024; Hopeless)
