= Between You & Me (band) =

Australian pop-punk band

- Origin: Melbourne, Australia
- Genres: Pop-punk
- Years active: 2016–2024
- Labels: Hopeless
- Members: Jake Wilson; Chris Bowerman; Jai Gibson; James Karagiozis; Jamey Bowerman
- Website: byamaus.com

Between You & Me is an Australian pop-punk band formed in Melbourne. Having released two studio albums through Hopeless Records in 2018 and 2021, the band is currently independent. A hiatus was announced in 2024

== History ==
Vocalist Jake Wilson started uploading acoustic performances to YouTube in 2015. He was then approached by twin brothers Chris (guitar) and Jamey Bowerman (drums); the band was completed when Jai Gibson (guitar) and James Karagiozis (bass guitar) joined after their band Sidelines stopped writing music. The band self-released debut EP Paper Thin in 2016, after which they toured with As It Is and With Confidence.

The band signed to Hopeless Records midway through 2017, and released the single "Overthinking" on 19 July 2017. They joined Trash Boat on the Australian leg of their 2017 tour. On 13 July 2018, they released their debut album Everything Is Temporary. The album was recorded at Electric Sun studios in Sydney and produced by Stevie Knight. Later in 2018, they supported Neck Deep on the Australian leg of their The Peace and the Panic tour and WSTR on their UK tour. The band released the standalone single "Famous" in 2019.

In June 2021, the band released the single "Supervillain". Following the release of singles "Deadbeat" and "Butterflies", their sophomore album Armageddon was announced. It was produced by Canadian producer Sam Guaiana and released on 19 November 2021, through Hopeless Records. Additional singles off the album include "Change" and "Go To Hell", the latter featuring Yours Truly. Following release, the album was chosen as triple j's Spotlight Album. The band embarked on a headlining Australian tour in support of the album in February of 2022. In late 2022 they supported State Champs on their Kings of the New Age tour in the US.

On 8 March 2023, the band announced that they had split with Hopeless Records in 2022, stating that "during the release of [their] sophomore album 'Armageddon', [they] felt that [their] label did not adequately support the record and uphold their obligations". Later that month, they independently released the single "Nevermind", which, like Armageddon, was produced by Sam Guaiana. In April 2023, the band toured with Knuckle Puck and Real Friends in the US.

The band released a single titled "Yeah!" on 8 November 2023. A week later, they announced their first UK headline tour, planned for February 2024.

On 21 February 2024 the band released a single named "In the Middle", and announced an EP titled Sh!t Yeah scheduled for released on 5 April 2024.

Following the conclusion of an Australian tour opening for Busted, the band announced an indefinite hiatus

== Style ==
Between You & Me’s style has been described as pop-punk and power pop. Their work has been compared to Neck Deep, State Champs, Blink-182, All Time Low, Mayday Parade, Yellowcard and Green Day.

== Members ==
Current members

- Jake Wilson – vocals
- Chris Bowerman – guitar
- Jai Gibson – guitar
- James Karagiozis – bass guitar
- Jamey Bowerman – drums

== Discography ==
=== Studio albums ===
List of studio albums
| Title | Album details |
|---|---|
| Everything Is Temporary | Released: 13 July 2018; Label: Hopeless; Format: CD, DL, LP |
| Armageddon | Released: 19 November 2021; Label: Hopeless; Format: CD, DL, LP |

=== Extended plays ===
List of extended plays
| Title | EP details |
|---|---|
| Paper Thin | Released 17 October 2016; Label: Self-released; Format: CD, DL |
| Sh!t Yeah | Scheduled: 5 April 2024; Label: Self-released; Format: CD, DL |

=== Singles ===
List of singles, showing year released and album name
| Title | Year | Album |
|---|---|---|
| "Cavalier" | 2016 | Non-album single |
| "Overthinking" | 2017 | Non-album single |
| "Dakota" | 2018 | Everything Is Temporary |
| "Friends from '96" | 2018 | Everything Is Temporary |
| "Famous" | 2019 | Non-album single |
| "Reimagined" | 2019 | Non-album single |
| "Supervillain" | 2021 | Armageddon |
| "Deadbeat" | 2021 | Armageddon |
| "Butterflies" | 2021 | Armageddon |
| "Change" | 2021 | Armageddon |
| "Go To Hell" (featuring Yours Truly) | 2021 | Armageddon |
| "Nevermind" | 2023 | Non-album single |
| "Two Wrongs" | 2023 | Non-album single |
| "Sometimes (My Brain Doesn't Work)" (with Somber Hills) | 2023 | Non-album single |
| "In the Middle" | 2024 | Sh!t Yeah |
