= Like Pacific =

Canadian rock band

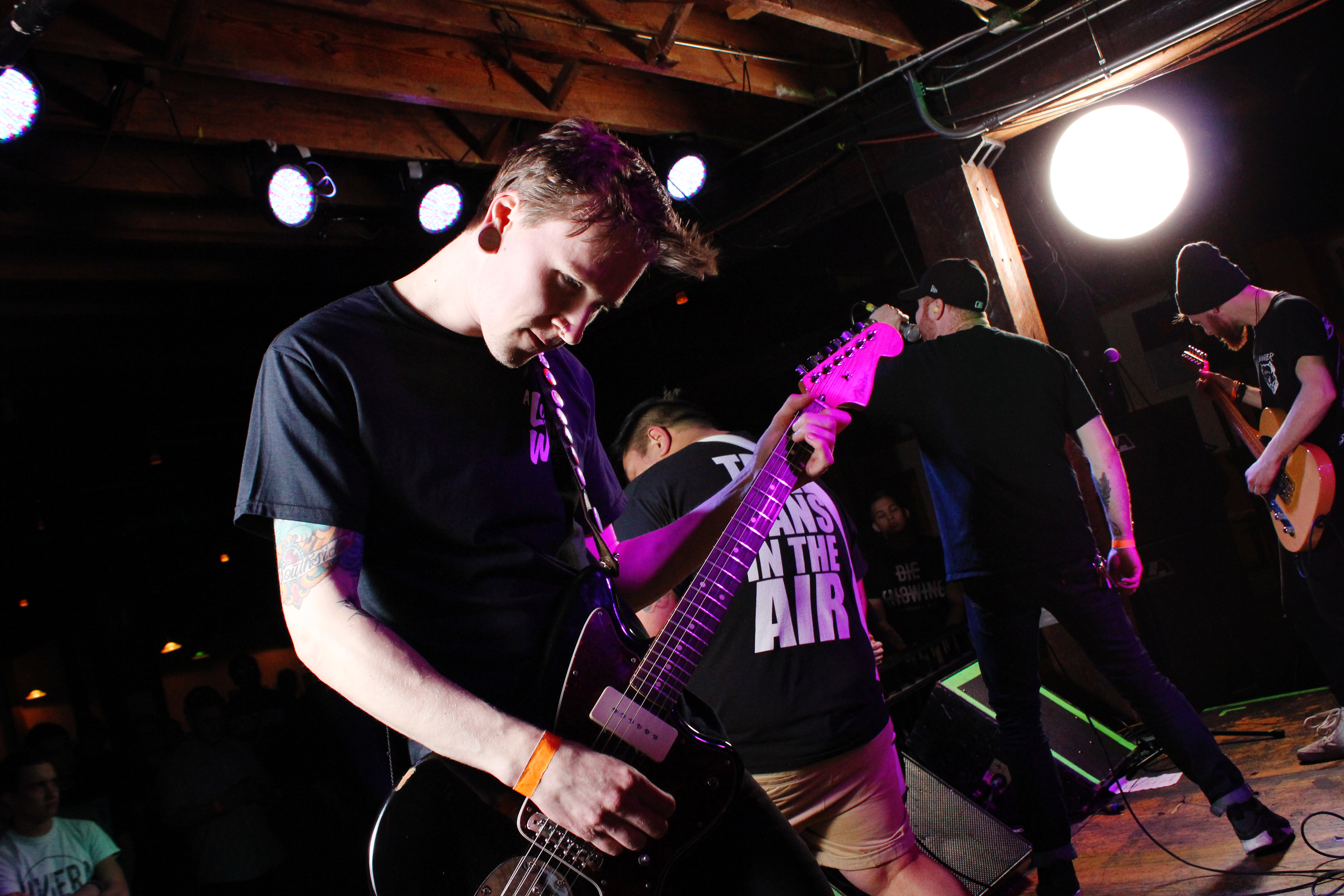
- Like Pacific, April 2015

Background information
- Origin: Toronto, Ontario
- Genres: Pop punk; emo
- Years active: 2010–present
- Labels: Pure Noise, New Damage
- Members: Jordan Black; Greg Hall; Luke Holmes; Brad Garcia; Tay Ewart
- Website: www.likepacific.com

Like Pacific is a Canadian rock band from Toronto, Ontario, formed in 2010. Their debut studio album Distant Like You Asked was released in February 2016, and charted at number 25 on the Billboard Heatseekers Albums chart.

== History ==
Like Pacific formed in 2010 in Toronto, Ontario. According to AllMusic biographer Timothy Monger, the band members "bonded over a shared love of hard-hitting melodic rock, eventually adopting the motto "stay pissed" to describe their approach." The group self-released The Worst... EP in 2011, and released another, titled Homebound, the following year. The band signed to independent label Pure Noise in December 2014, and released a self-titled EP in January 2015. In July and August, the band supported Forever Came Calling on their tour of the US.

In December 2015, "Worthless Case" was made available for streaming. In January 2016, a music video was released for "Distant". The band's debut album, Distant Like You Asked, was released in February through Pure Noise, and charted at number 25 on the Billboard Heatseekers Albums chart. In February and March, the band supported State Champs on their tour of the US. In May, the group supported Good Charlotte on their US tour. The band toured as part of the 2016 edition of Warped Tour. In May 2017, the band performed at Slam Dunk Festival in the UK. Around the festival, the band supported Trophy Eyes on some of their headlining UK shows. In September and October, the group supported Four Year Strong for their 10th anniversary tour for Rise or Die Trying (2007).

In February 2018, the band released the single "Sedatives". In early March, the band announced that bassist Chris Thaung would be leaving the band for personal reasons at the end of their UK tour with As It Is. According to a source close to the band, ex-bassist Trevor Wilkes tried repeatedly to rejoin the band to not avail. Throughout mid 2018, the band released three more singles "In Spite of Me", "Had It Coming", and "Self Defeated"" before releasing their second album In Spite of Me in late July.

== Band members ==
Current

- Jordan Black – lead vocals
- Greg Hall – rhythm guitar, backing vocals
- Luke Holmes – lead guitar, backing vocals
- Brad Garcia – bass guitar, backing vocals
- Taylor Ewart – drums, percussion

Former

- Chris Thaung – bass guitar
- Sohail Naseem - guitar
- Andrew Brunette – guitar
- Dylan Burnett – guitar
- Elvy Lee – guitar
- Cam Ward – guitar
- Dillon Forret – drums
- Mike Robinson – drums

== Discography ==
Studio albums

Title	Album details
Distant Like You Asked	Released: February 19, 2016; Label: Pure Noise (PNE183); Format: CD, DL, LP
In Spite of Me	Released: July 27, 2018; Label: Pure Noise; Format: CD, DL, LP
Control My Sanity	Released: December 3, 2021; Label: Pure Noise; Format: CD, DL, LP

Extended plays

Title	Album details
The Worst...	Released: May 17, 2011; Label: Self-released; Format: DL
Homebound	Released: August 3, 2012; Label: Self-released; Format: DL
This Place Hasn't Changed, It Just Made You	Released: May 27, 2013; Label: Self-released; Format: DL
Stay Pissed.	Released: September 16, 2013; Label: New Wave Tapes; Format: CS
Like Pacific	Released: January 25, 2015; Label: Pure Noise (PNE161); Format: CD, DL, LP
