= As December Falls =

British rock band

- Origin: Nottingham, Nottinghamshire, England
- Genres: Post-hardcore; alternative metal; melodic metalcore; progressive metal
- Years active: 2014–present
- Label: ADF
- Members: Bethany Hunter Jiménez; Ande Hunter Jiménez; Timmy Francis
- Past members: Will Brown; Lukas James; Kiaran Hegarty
- Website: www.asdecemberfalls.com

As December Falls is a British rock band from Nottingham, Nottinghamshire, England.

They won Best UK Breakthrough Artist at the Heavy Music Awards in 2023.

== Discography ==
=== Studio albums ===
List of studio albums, with selected details
Title	Album details	Peak chart positions
Title	Album details	UK
As December Falls	Released: 8 February 2019; Label: ADF; Format: CD, vinyl, digital download	—
Happier.	Released: 6 August 2021; Label: ADF; Format: CD, vinyl, cassette, digital download	—
Join the Club	Released: 21 July 2023; Label: ADF; Format: CD, vinyl, cassette	11
Everything's On Fire But I'm Fine	Released: 15 August 2025; Label: ADF; Format: CD, vinyl, cassette, digital download	8

==== Live albums ====
List of live albums, with selected details
Title	Album details
Live at Rescue Rooms	Released: 1 December 2017; Label: ADF; Format: Digital download
The Live Album	Released: 6 September 2024; Label: ADF; Format: Digital download

==== Compilation albums ====
List of compilation albums, with selected details
Title	Album details
As December Falls Essentials	Released: 2024; Label: ADF; Format: CD

=== Extended plays ===
List of extended plays, with selected details
Title	EP details
A Home Inside Your Head	Released: 23 November 2014; Label: Self-released; Format: CD, digital download
When You Figure Out You're Wrong, Get Back to Me	Released: 19 February 2016; Label: Self-released; Format: CD, digital download

=== Singles ===
List of singles, showing release year, and album
Title	Year	Album
"Cross My Heart"	2014	A Home Inside Your Head (EP)
"Capture"	2015	When You Figure Out You're; Wrong, Get Back To Me (EP)
"Don't Say a Word" (Note: "Don't Say a Word" is also the lead single from the band's self-titled album.)	2016	When You Figure Out You're; Wrong, Get Back To Me (EP)
"Everything You Say"	2016	When You Figure Out You're; Wrong, Get Back To Me (EP)
"More To You"	2017	As December Falls
"Touch"	2017	Non-album singles
"Keep Dreaming"	2017	Non-album singles
"Break Your Heart"	2018	As December Falls
"Ride"	2018	As December Falls
"One More Night"	2018	As December Falls
"On the Edge"	2018	As December Falls
"No Money"	2019	As December Falls
"Do You Remember"	2019	As December Falls
"I Think We're Alone Now"	2019	Non-album single
"From the Start"	2019	As December Falls
"Afterglow"	2020	Happier.
"I Don't Feel Like Feeling Great"	2021	Happier.
"Tears"	2021	Happier.
"Nothing on You"	2021	Happier.
"You Say When"	2021	Happier.
"Go Away"	2022	Join the Club
"Mayday"	2022	Join the Club
"Over You" (with Flash Forward)	2022	Endings = Beginnings
"Home"	2022	Join the Club
"Carousel"	2023	Join the Club
"Alive"	2023	Join the Club
"Little By Little"	2023	Join the Club
"Join the Club"	2023	Join the Club
"Angry Cry"	2024	Everything's On Fire But I'm Fine
"Therapy"	2025	Everything's On Fire But I'm Fine
"For the Plot"	2025	Everything's On Fire But I'm Fine
"Fall Apart"	2025	Everything's On Fire But I'm Fine
"Bathroom Floor"	2025	Everything's On Fire But I'm Fine
"Ready Set Go	2025	Everything's On Fire But I'm Fine
"Flametide"	2025	Muse Dash (video game)
"Anymore"	2026	TBA
"Message Man"	2026	Non-album single
"Teeth"	2026	TBA

==== As featured artist ====
Title	Year	Album
"Clarity" (Gold Bloom featuring As December Falls)	2024	Non-album single
"Y U Gotta Do Me Like That" (Down And Out featuring As December Falls)	2024	Sunk Cost Fallacy
"Violence" (The Hara featuring As December Falls)	2025	The Fallout
"Stupid Boy" (Stain the Canvas featuring As December Falls)	2025	Honey Rot

== See also ==
- List of UK Rock & Metal Albums Chart number ones of 2023
