= Roam (band) =

British rock band

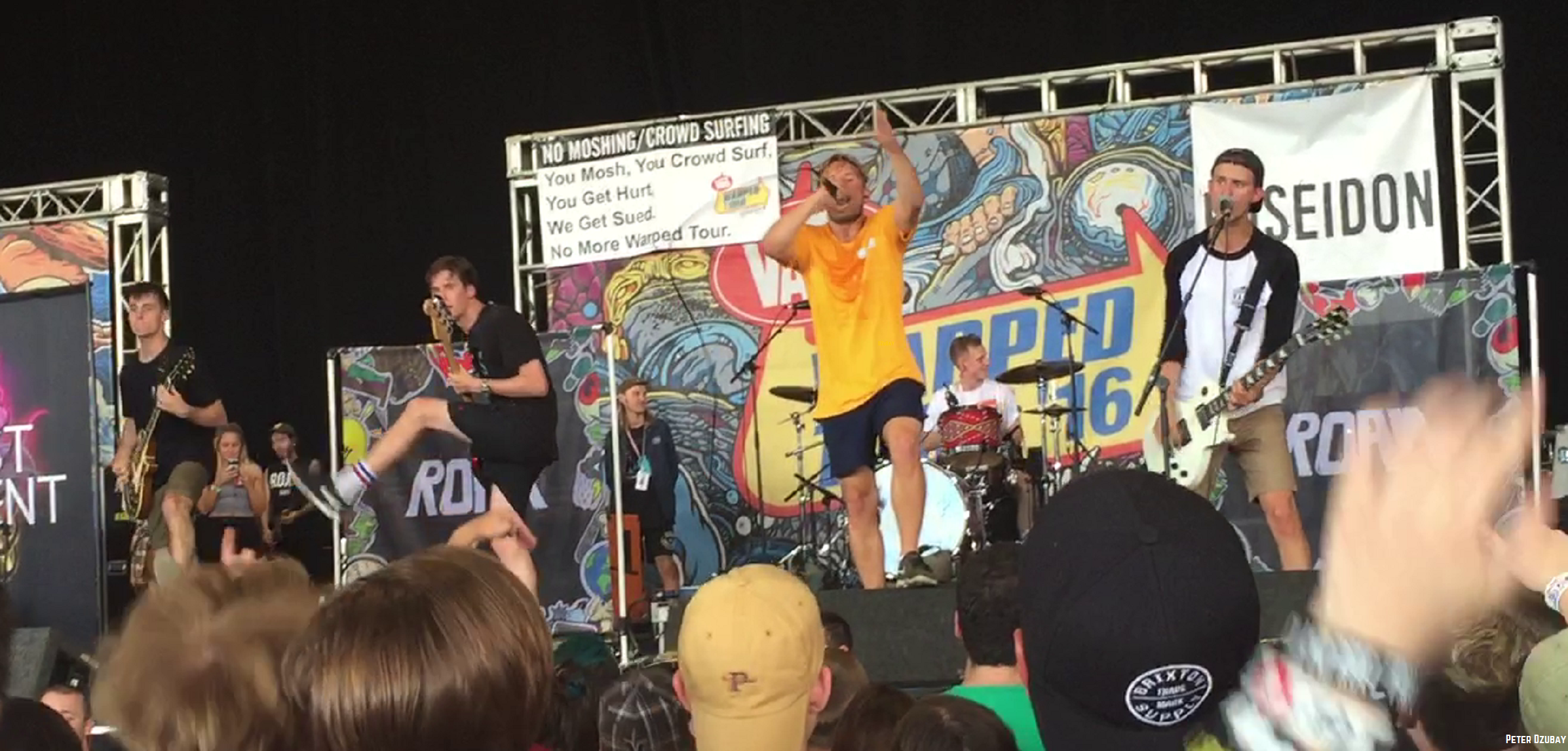
- Roam performing on Warped Tour in Hartford, CT in 2016. From left to right Sam Veness, Matt Roskilly, Alex Costello, Miles Gill, and Alex Adam.

Background information
- Origin: Eastbourne, East Sussex, England
- Genre: Pop-punk
- Years active: 2012–2022
- Label: Hopeless
- Members: Alex Adam; Alex Costello; Matt Roskilly; Sam Veness; Miles Gill
- Past members: Charlie Pearson
- Website: www.roam.uk.com

Roam (often stylized as ROAM) were a British rock band from Eastbourne in England. The band consists of vocalist Alex Costello, bass guitarist Matt Roskilly, lead guitarist and backing vocalist Alex Adam, rhythm guitarist Sam Veness, and drummer Miles Gill.

== History ==
=== Formation, signing and early recordings (2012–15) ===
Roam formed in September 2012 in Eastbourne, England. The group began performing in November 2012. The band began producing original music in early 2012, and independently released two EPs, No Common Ground, which was released in 2012, and Head Down, which was released in 2013. The group was signed to Hopeless Records in 2014 and soon afterwards released the Viewpoint EP in 2015.

=== Backbone and Great Heights and Nosedives (2016–18) ===
The band released its debut album, Backbone, on 22 January 2016, through Hopeless. Following the release of the band's debut album Backbone, the band supported Sum 41 during Kerrang! Tour 2016.

On 29 February, Roam announced that the band had parted with its drummer Charlie Pearson, stating that "We are extremely thankful for all his work and commitment to us over the past three years, and wish him the very best in the future." The band also stated that in shows following Pearson's departure, drummer Miles Gill would serve as touring drummer at the band's performances. The band performed on every date of the 2016 Warped Tour. In August 2016, the group announced that Miles Gill would join the band full-time.

On 21 August 2017, the band announced that their second album, Great Heights & Nosedives, would be released on 13 October.

=== Smile Wide (2019–2022) ===
On 1 July 2019, the band announced their third album, Smile Wide would be released on 6 September and dropped the first single "I Don't Think I Live There Anymore". On 22 July they released a second single titled "Piranha".

Together with the band With Confidence, they toured Europe and the United Kingdom in September and October 2019.

On 21 June 2022, the band announced that they are splitting up and will play several farewell shows.

== Musical style ==
Roam's music is pop punk. AllMusic biographer Neil Yeung noted that the band "took cues from New Found Glory, Blink-182, Sum 41, and Simple Plan".

== Band members ==
=== Last members ===
- Alex Costello – lead vocals (2012–2022)
- Matt Roskilly – bass guitar (2012–2022)
- Alex Adam – lead guitar, backing vocals (2012–2022)
- Sam Veness – rhythm guitar (2012–2022)
- Miles Gill – drums (2016–2022)

=== Former members ===
- Charlie Pearson – drums, percussion (2012–2016)

== Discography ==
Studio albums

List of studio albums
Title	Album details	Peak chart positions
Title	Album details	UK
Backbone	Released: 22 January 2016; Label: Hopeless (HR2192); Format: CD, DL, LP	178
Great Heights & Nosedives	Released: 13 October 2017; Label: Hopeless; Format: CD, DL, LP	
Smile Wide	Released: 6 September 2019; Label: Hopeless; Format: CD, DL, LP	

Extended plays

List of extended plays
Title	Album details
No Common Ground	Released: 4 November 2012; Label: Self-released; Format: DL
Head Down	Released: 18 November 2013; Label: Self-released; Format: CD, DL, 7" vinyl
Viewpoint	Released: 27 January 2015; Label: Hopeless (HR2121); Format: CD, DL, 12" vinyl

Music videos

List of music videos, showing year released and director
Title	Year	Director
"Head Rush"	2013	Elliott Ingham
"Nothing In Return"	2013	Elliott Ingham
"Warning Sign"	2014	Elliott Ingham
"Deadweight"	2015	Elliott Ingham
"Hopeless Case"	2015	Elliott Ingham
"Tracks"	2016	Zach Lower
"Playing Fiction"	2017	Zach Lower
"Alive"	2017	Zach Lower
"The Rich Life Of A Poor Man"	2018	Zach Lower
"I Don't Think I Live There Anymore"	2019	Lewis Cater
