= Neck Deep discography =

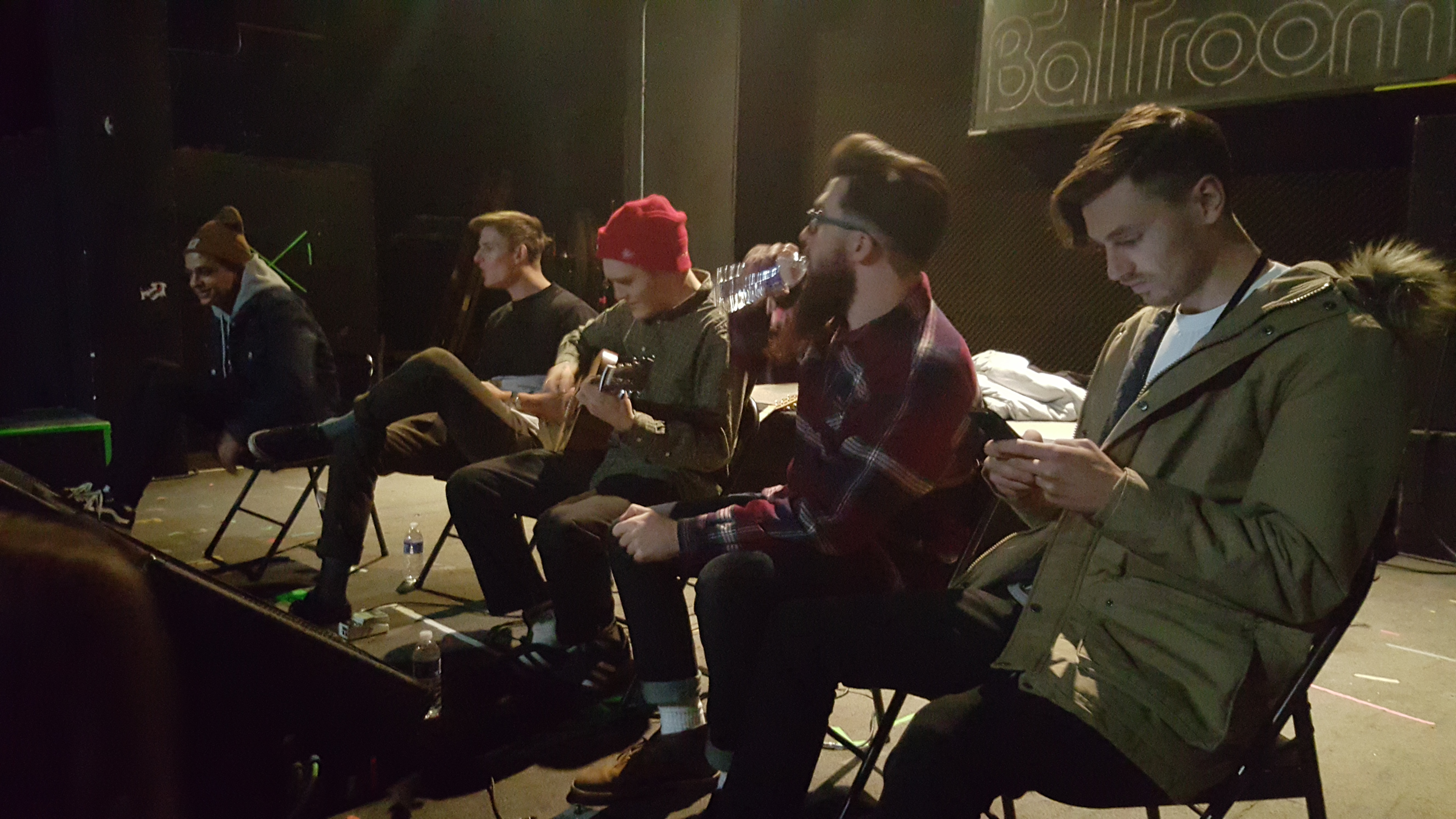
- Neck Deep in 2016.
- Studio albums: 5
- EPs: 3
- Compilation albums: 1
- Singles: 18
- Music videos: 25

The discography of Neck Deep, a Welsh pop punk band, consists of five studio albums, one compilation album, three extended plays (EPs), eighteen singles and twenty-five music videos. Formed in Wrexham in 2012, Neck Deep originally featured lead vocalist Ben Barlow, lead guitarist Lloyd Roberts, rhythm guitarist Matt West, bassist Fil Thorpe-Evans and drummer Dani Washington. The band signed with independent record label We Are Triumphant in June 2012, before releasing their debut EP Rain in July in September that year. This was later followed by a second EP entitled A History of Bad Decisions, which was self-released by the band on 19 February 2013. Pinky Swear Records also issued the Rain in July and A History of Bad Decisions EPs together as a double 12" vinyl compilation on the same day.

After signing with Hopeless Records in August 2013, Neck Deep released their full-length debut album Wishful Thinking in January 2014. The album reached number 2 on the UK Rock & Metal Albums Chart, number 3 on the US Heatseekers Albums chart, and registered on several other UK and US charts. Hopeless also reissued the band's first two EPs, both separately and as a single set. In February, the group released a split EP with American band Knuckle Puck, and in June they released a cover version of Green Day's "Boulevard of Broken Dreams" for the Kerrang! free compilation Kerrang! Does Green Day's American Idiot. In 2015, the band contributed covers of Funeral for a Friend's "Juneau" and Blink-182's "Don't Tell Me It's Over" to compilations released by Rock Sound and Kerrang! magazines, respectively.

In August 2015, Neck Deep released their second studio album Life's Not out to Get You, which reached number 8 on the UK Albums Chart and number 17 on the US Billboard 200, as well as topping the UK Independent Albums and US Independent Albums charts. Days after the album's release, Roberts left the band when accusations of "misconduct with underage girls" were levelled at the guitarist (as well as other members of the group). He was later replaced by Sam Bowden, who was previously a member of Blood Youth.

== Albums ==
=== Studio albums ===
List of studio albums, with selected chart positions
Title	Album details	Peak chart positions										Sales/Certifications
Title	Album details	UK	UK Rock	UK Indie	UK Indie Break.	AUS	BEL Fla.	US	US Heat.	US Indie.	US Rock	Sales/Certifications
Wishful Thinking	Released: 14 January 2014; Label: Hopeless; Formats: CD, LP, DL	108	2	14	6	—	—	—	3	35	—	
Life's Not Out to Get You	Released: 14 August 2015; Label: Hopeless; Formats: CD, LP, DL	8	2	1	—	28	87	17	—	1	3	BPI: Silver; US: 18,000; WW: 26,251
The Peace and the Panic	Released: 18 August 2017; Label: Hopeless; Formats: CD, LP, DL, streaming	4	1	1	—	8	39	4	—	2	2	BPI: Silver; UK: 41,437; US: 29,000; WW: 40,000
All Distortions Are Intentional	Released: 24 July 2020; Label: Hopeless; Formats: CD, LP, DL, streaming	4	1	1	—	46	—	64	—	2	2	WW: 20,000
Neck Deep	Released: 19 January 2024; Label: Hopeless; Formats: CD, LP, DL, streaming	11	3	2	—	22	—	—	—	—	—	

=== Compilation albums ===
List of compilation albums
Title	Album details
Rain in July/A History of Bad Decisions	Released: 19 February 2013; Label: Pinky Swear; Format: 12" vinyl

== Extended plays ==
List of extended plays
Title	EP details
Rain in July	Released: 11 September 2012; Label: We Are Triumphant; Formats: CS, DL
A History of Bad Decisions	Released: 19 February 2013; Label: none (self-released); Format: DL
Tour Split (split EP with Knuckle Puck)	Released: 25 February 2014; Labels: Hopeless/Bad Timing; Formats: 7" vinyl, DL
Serpents	Released: 10 March 2016; Label: Hopeless; Formats: DL
In Bloom: Versions	Released: 1 August 2018; Label: Hopeless; Formats: DL

== Singles ==
List of singles, showing year released and album name
Title	Year	Certifications	Album
"Crushing Grief (No Remedy)"	2013		Wishful Thinking
"Growing Pains"	2013		Wishful Thinking
"Boulevard of Broken Dreams" (Green Day cover)	2014		Kerrang! Does Green; Day's American Idiot
"Losing Teeth"	2014		Wishful Thinking
"Can't Kick Up the Roots"	2015		Life's Not Out to Get You
"Gold Steps"	2015		Life's Not Out to Get You
"Serpents"	2016		Life's Not Out to Get You
"December"	2016	RIAA: Gold	Life's Not Out to Get You
"Where Do We Go When We Go"	2017		The Peace and the Panic
"Happy Judgement Day"	2017		The Peace and the Panic
"Motion Sickness"	2017		The Peace and the Panic
"In Bloom"	2017		The Peace and the Panic
"She's a God"	2019		Non-album single
"Lowlife"	2020		All Distortions Are Intentional
"When You Know"	2020		All Distortions Are Intentional
"Fall"	2020		All Distortions Are Intentional
"I Revolve (Around You)"	2020		All Distortions Are Intentional
"Sick Joke"	2020		All Distortions Are Intentional
"STFU"	2022		Neck Deep (Dumbfuck Edition)
"Heartbreak of the Century"	2023		Neck Deep
"Take Me With You"	2023		Neck Deep
"It Won't Be Like This Forever"	2023		Neck Deep
"We Need More Bricks"	2023		Neck Deep
"Dumbstruck Dumbfuck"	2024		Neck Deep
"You Should See Me Now"	2025		Neck Deep (Dumbfuck Edition)

== Music videos ==
List of music videos, showing year released and director(s) name
Title	Year	Director(s)	Ref.
"A Part of Me" (featuring Laura Whiteside)	2012	Foam Productions	
"I Couldn't Wait to Leave 6 Months Ago"	2012	Matt West, Mark Brenner	
"Over and Over"	2013	Adam Davies	
"Crushing Grief (No Remedy)"	2013	unknown	
"Growing Pains"	2013	LOVE Vis-Art	
"Losing Teeth"	2014	unknown	
"Can't Kick Up the Roots"	2015	Daniel Broadley	
"Gold Steps"	2015	Kyle Thrash	
"Smooth Seas Don't Make Good Sailors"	2015	Joshua Halling	
"Kali Ma"	2016	Elliott Ingham	
"Serpents"	2016	Miguel Barbosa	
"December" (featuring Chris Carrabba)	2016	Daniel Broadley	
"December (Again)" (featuring Mark Hoppus)	2016	Daniel Broadley	
"Where Do We Go When We Go"	2017	Anthem Films	
"Happy Judgement Day"	2017	Dan Fusselman	
"Motion Sickness"	2017	Elliott Ingham	
"In Bloom"	2017	Lewis Cater	
"Parachute"	2017	Lewis Cater	
"Don't Wait"	2018	Our World Is Grey	
"She's a God"	2019	Our World Is Grey	
"Lowlife"	2020	YHELLOW	
"When You Know"	2020	Neck Deep	
"Fall"	2020	Elliott Ingham, Chrisblockd	
"I Revolve (Around You)"	2020	Félix Kerjean	
"Sick Joke"	2020	Elliott Ingham, Chrisblockd	
"STFU"	2022	Max Moore	
"Heartbreak Of The Century"	2023	Max Moore	
"Take Me With You"	2023	Olli Appleyard	
"It Won't Be Like This Forever"	2023	Max Moore	
"Dumbstruck Dumbf**k"	2024	Nick Suchak	
"Sort Yourself Out"	2024	Olli Appleyard	

== Other appearances ==
List of other appearances, showing year released and album name
Title	Year	Album	Ref.
"Boulevard of Broken Dreams" (Green Day cover)	2014	Kerrang! Does Green Day's American Idiot	
"Juneau" (Funeral for a Friend cover)	2015	Worship and Tributes	
"Don't Tell Me It's Over" (Blink-182 cover)	2015	Kerrang! Ultimate Rock Heroes!	
"Welcome to Paradise" (Green Day cover)	2017	Green Day: The Early Years	
"Torn" (Ednaswap cover)	2018	Songs That Saved My Life	

== See also ==
- List of songs recorded by Neck Deep
