= List of songs recorded by Neck Deep =

The following is a sortable table of all songs by Neck Deep:

== Studio recordings ==
Song	Writer(s)	Album	Producer	Year	Length
"A Part of Me"	Neck Deep	Rain in July (EP)	Sebastian Barlow	2012	3:09
"All Hype, No Heart"	Neck Deep	Rain in July (EP)	Sebastian Barlow	2012	0:44
"Blank Pages"	Neck Deep	Wishful Thinking	Sebastian Barlow, Neck Deep	2014	3:13
"Boulevard of Broken Dreams" (Green Day cover)	Billie Joe Armstrong, Green Day	Kerrang! Does Green Day's American Idiot	—	2014	3:37
"Candour"	Neck Deep	Wishful Thinking	Sebastian Barlow, Neck Deep	2014	3:17
"Can't Kick Up the Roots"	Neck Deep, Sebastian Barlow, Andrew Wade	Life's Not out to Get You	Jeremy McKinnon, Andrew Wade	2015	2:49
"Can't Kick Up the Roots" (acoustic)^{[B]}	Neck Deep, Sebastian Barlow, Andrew Wade	Life's Not out to Get You	Jeremy McKinnon, Andrew Wade	2015	2:50
"Citizens of Earth"	Neck Deep, Sebastian Barlow	Life's Not out to Get You	Jeremy McKinnon, Andrew Wade	2015	2:40
"Crushing Grief (No Remedy)"	Neck Deep, Sebastian Barlow	Wishful Thinking	Sebastian Barlow, Neck Deep	2014	2:59
"Damsel in Distress" (demo)^{[A]}	Neck Deep	—	—	2012	0:56
"Damsel in Distress"	Neck Deep	Wishful Thinking	Sebastian Barlow, Neck Deep	2014	3:22
"December"	Neck Deep, Sebastian Barlow, Andrew Wade, Jeremy McKinnon	Life's Not out to Get You	Jeremy McKinnon, Andrew Wade	2015	3:39
"December" (full band version)^{[B]}	Neck Deep, Sebastian Barlow, Andrew Wade, Jeremy McKinnon	Life's Not out to Get You	Jeremy McKinnon, Andrew Wade	2015	3:36
"Don't Tell Me It's Over" (Blink-182 cover)	Mark Hoppus, Tom DeLonge, Travis Barker	Kerrang! Ultimate Rock Heroes!	—	2015	2:28
"Gold Steps"	Neck Deep, Tom Denney, Andrew Wade, Jeremy McKinnon	Life's Not out to Get You	Jeremy McKinnon, Andrew Wade	2015	3:12
"Growing Pains"	Neck Deep	Wishful Thinking	Sebastian Barlow, Neck Deep	2014	3:33
"Head to the Ground"	Neck Deep	A History of Bad Decisions (EP)	Sebastian Barlow	2013	2:40
"I Couldn't Wait to Leave 6 Months Ago"	Neck Deep	Rain in July (EP)	Sebastian Barlow	2012	2:25
"I Hope This Comes Back to Haunt You"	Neck Deep, Sebastian Barlow, Andrew Wade, Jeremy McKinnon	Life's Not out to Get You	Jeremy McKinnon, Andrew Wade	2015	2:49
"Juneau" (Funeral for a Friend cover)	Funeral for a Friend	Worship and Tributes	—	2015	3:34
"Kali Ma"	Neck Deep, Sebastian Barlow, Andrew Wade, Jeremy McKinnon	Life's Not out to Get You	Jeremy McKinnon, Andrew Wade	2015	2:50
"Kick It"	Neck Deep	Rain in July (EP)	Sebastian Barlow	2012	1:34
"Lime St."	Neck Deep, Sebastian Barlow	Life's Not out to Get You	Jeremy McKinnon, Andrew Wade	2015	3:19
"Lime St." (acoustic)^{[B]}	Neck Deep, Sebastian Barlow	Life's Not out to Get You	Jeremy McKinnon, Andrew Wade	2015	3:14
"Losing Teeth"	Neck Deep	Wishful Thinking	Sebastian Barlow, Neck Deep	2014	2:59
"Mileage"	Neck Deep	Wishful Thinking	Sebastian Barlow, Neck Deep	2014	2:39
"Over and Over"	Neck Deep	Rain in July (EP)	Sebastian Barlow	2012	2:56
"Rock Bottom"	Neck Deep, Sebastian Barlow, Andrew Wade, Jeremy McKinnon	Life's Not out to Get You	Jeremy McKinnon, Andrew Wade	2015	3:20
"Say What You Want"	Neck Deep	Wishful Thinking	Sebastian Barlow, Neck Deep	2014	1:01
"Serpents"	Neck Deep, Tom Denney, Andrew Wade, Jeremy McKinnon	Life's Not out to Get You	Jeremy McKinnon, Andrew Wade	2015	2:45
"She's A God"	Neck Deep	Single		2019	3:20
"Silver Lining"	Neck Deep	Rain in July (EP)	Sebastian Barlow	2012	2:47
"Smooth Seas Don't Make Good Sailors"	Neck Deep, Tom Denney, Andrew Wade, Jeremy McKinnon	Life's Not out to Get You	Jeremy McKinnon, Andrew Wade	2015	3:05
"Staircase Wit"	Neck Deep	Wishful Thinking	Sebastian Barlow, Neck Deep	2014	3:10
"Sweet Nothings"	Neck Deep	Wishful Thinking	Sebastian Barlow, Neck Deep	2014	2:42
"Tables Turned"	Neck Deep	A History of Bad Decisions (EP)	Sebastian Barlow	2013	3:23
"The Beach Is for Lovers (Not Lonely Losers)"	Neck Deep, Sebastian Barlow, Andrew Wade, Jeremy McKinnon	Life's Not out to Get You	Jeremy McKinnon, Andrew Wade	2015	3:04
"Threat Level Midnight"	Neck Deep, Sebastian Barlow	Life's Not out to Get You	Jeremy McKinnon, Andrew Wade	2015	2:46
"Up in Smoke"	Neck Deep	A History of Bad Decisions (EP)	Sebastian Barlow	2013	3:10
"What Did You Expect?"	Neck Deep	Rain in July (EP)	Sebastian Barlow	2012	3:18
"What Did You Expect?"	Neck Deep	Wishful Thinking	Sebastian Barlow, Neck Deep	2014	3:16
"Zoltar Speaks"	Neck Deep	Wishful Thinking	Sebastian Barlow, Neck Deep	2014	2:57
"Torn" (Natalie Imbruglia/Lis Sørensen Cover)	Scott Cutler, Anne Preven and Phil Thornalley	Songs That Saved My Life	Sebastian Barlow	2018	4:08
"Fall"	Neck Deep	"All Distortions Are Intentional"	Sebastian Barlow, Neck Deep	2020	3:35
"When You Know"	Neck Deep	"All Distortions Are Intentional"	Sebastian Barlow, Neck Deep	2020	3:09
"Lowlife"	Neck Deep	"All Distortions Are Intentional"	Sebastian Barlow, Neck Deep	2020	3:10

== See also ==
- Neck Deep discography
