= The Peace and the Panic =

Studio album by Neck Deep
- Released: 18 August 2017
- Recorded: March–April 2017
- Studio: Los Angeles, California, US
- Genre: Pop punk; alternative rock
- Length: 39:34
- Label: Hopeless
- Producer: Mike Green

Neck Deep chronology
Life's Not out to Get You (2015)	The Peace and the Panic (2017)	All Distortions Are Intentional (2020)

Singles from The Peace and the Panic
- 1. "Where Do We Go When We Go" Released: 21 May 2017; 2. "Happy Judgement Day" Released: 21 May 2017; 3. "Motion Sickness" Released: 12 July 2017; 4. "In Bloom" Released: 13 August 2017; 5. "Parachute" Released: 10 November 2017; 6. "Don't Wait" Released: 7 June 2018

The Peace and the Panic is the third studio album by Welsh pop punk band Neck Deep. It is the band’s first album to feature lead guitarist Sam Bowden, formerly of the bands Blood Youth and Climates and the last to feature founding bassist and backing vocalist Fil Thorpe-Evans before his departure in September 2018. The group planned to work on material for their follow-up album by the end of the year, though were unable due to tour commitments. In June 2016, the band went on a two-week writing retreat in Wales, creating 40 song drafts in the process. At the end of the year, vocalist Ben Barlow said the group had around 30 demos and two completed songs. Following a support slot for A Day to Remember in early 2017, the band began recording The Peace and the Panic in March and April in Los Angeles, California. Mike Green produced the album with assistance from engineers Will McCoy and Colin Schwanke. Most of the album was mixed by Neal Avron, while Green mixed three of the songs.

The album's theme is showing how the band has grown in the period following the release of Life's Not out to Get You. The album's songs were written by a combination of the band, Mike Green and Ben Barlow's brother Sebastian. Sam Carter of Architects, Laura Whiteside, and Ella, Evie, Finlay and Darcy Jones provide vocals to different tracks. Barlow said the main part of the album's artwork is about "being on a tightrope between 'The Peace' and 'The Panic' – trying to find the balance between the good and the bad". After two teasers, as well as a support slot for All Time Low, The Peace and the Panic was formally announced, and music videos were released for "Where Do We Go When We Go" and "Happy Judgement Day". Following performances at Slam Dunk Festival in the UK and Warped Tour in the US, music videos were released for "Motion Sickness" and "In Bloom". The Peace and the Panic was then released on 18 August through independent label Hopeless Records.

== Background ==
In August 2015, Neck Deep released their second album, Life's Not out to Get You, which reached the top 10 in the UK. Shortly afterwards, guitarist Lloyd Roberts left the band as allegations were made that he had sent an underage fan explicit messages. Roberts went through an investigation with North Wales Police, who subsequently "found no case for me to answer" and closed the investigation. Despite this, Roberts was replaced by Sam Bowden, though he was not made an official member until later in the year. Bowden was working as a guitar tech for the band, in between playing in Blood Youth and Climates. In mid-October, while on tour in the US, Barlow received news that his dad was in hospital. When he got to an airport to fly home, his dad had died. While mourning, Barlow toyed with an idea for a song that would later become "19 Seventy Sumthin'".

At the end of the year, the band planned to work on material for their next album. However, tour commitments kept them from doing so. In June 2016, the band posted a picture of what was presumed to be vocalist Ben Barlow and guitarist Matt West working on new music. It was later revealed that this was a writing retreat at Monnow Valley Studio in Wales. The retreat lasted for two weeks with Barlow's brother Sebastian in attendance. Barlow said the first week was very productive, while saying the second week "wasn’t productive at all", only managing to come up with two songs from that week. Eventually, the band made rough drafts of close to 40 songs. In an interview in December 2016, Barlow said the band had been "working on [their third album] for a long time already, but the real work is not too far away". In addition, he revealed that the band had around 30 demos and two finished songs.

== Recording ==
After supporting A Day to Remember in the UK and Europe in January and February 2017, the band entered the recording studio to track their next album. Recording took place in Los Angeles, California with producer Mike Green. Green was assisted by engineers Will McCoy and Colin Schwanke. Thorpe-Evans called Green "a proper musical genius", saying he was "super focused – like a laser – and it made us feel really professional". Green helped push the band on structuring their songs. Barlow mentioned that they had "a tendency to ramble in our songwriting; he stripped that back and he really made us think about every part of our songs."

Bowden said the band had a lot of "solid ideas that within the first week we knew, 'Okay, this is going to be sick, let’s chill'" and that they "pretty much blasted a song a day". After two months of recording, the band announced that the album was finished on 5 April. Upon leaving the studio, the band felt more accomplished as a group than when they first entered the studio. Neal Avron mixed the majority of the album, except for "The Grand Delusion", "Beautiful Madness" and "Worth It", which were mixed by Green. Barlow said Avron gave the album a "rock-heavy feel and mix". Ted Jensen mastered the album.

== Composition ==
=== Overview ===
The theme behind the album is about how the band has grown in the two years following Life's Not out to Get You. When the band were writing the latter album, they were going through what Barlow calls "a period of uninterrupted happiness". After touring that album, Barlow said that he re-evaluated "what life is about and questioned whether just having a positive outlook is enough". Barlow said the album has a lot to offer "people who think they don't like [Neck Deep]". Mentioning "Don't Wait" and "Parachute", Barlow said they "left ourselves some open doors that we can explore [in the future]". With the album, Barlow said it was "time to get a bit more real" with their fans. He added that there was "things in life that you can't avoid – like sadness, failure, anxiety and death – but it's coming to that realisation that's changed me personally, and us as a band".

Instead of solely writing 10–14 songs, the band were constantly writing for their third album. Barlow reasoned that "you might always find something better, and you might have an idea out of nothing". Barlow viewed the album as more of a collaborative effort with every member of the band writing material. He was hoping this would "produce some different results, but in the best possible way". Barlow's brother Sebastian, who had co-wrote the majority of the tracks on Life's Not out to Get You, was "really involved this time" contributing a lot of ideas. Barlow mentioned that he wrote two songs on guitar, which was "quite new for me". The majority of the lyrics on the album were written by Barlow. In addition, Barlow and Thorpe-Evans co-wrote lyrics to "Wish You Were Here".

=== Songs ===
"Motion Sickness" and "Parachute" were credited to Neck Deep, Green and Sebastian Barlow. "Happy Judgement Day", "The Grand Delusion", "19 Seventy Sumthin'" and "Beautiful Madness" were credited to Neck Deep and Green. "In Bloom", "Heavy Lies" and "Where Do We Go When We Go" were credited to Neck Deep and Barlow. "Don't Wait", "Critical Mistake", "Wish You Were Here" and "Worth It" were credited to Neck Deep. Sam Carter of Architects provides guest vocals on "Don't Wait". The intro vocals on "Where Do We Go When We Go" were performed by Ella, Evie, Finlay and Darcy Jones. Laura Whiteside provides the intro to "Critical Mistake".

"Motion Sickness" originally existed as "a demo idea we’d had sitting around for ages", according to Ben Barlow. His brother "had the idea of having the super-punchy, stabby chorus". He said the track "bridges the vibe and lyrical message" of Life's Not out to Get You to The Peace and the Panic and is the track most reminiscent of their previous material. He added that, like the majority of the album, the song features the theme of "duality; the verses are about confusion and struggle, but the choruses are about not giving up, not letting hard times get the best of you." "Happy Judgement Day" came out from a riff that Green played the band in the studio. As soon as the group heard it, they exclaimed "That’s sick – let’s instantly make that into a song". The song talks about the current state of society and politics. Barlow said he wrote the track because he wanted to write "something that was ... important, that gets people to care about the right things, and maybe look at themselves more critically".

"The Grand Delusion" was one of the last tracks written for the album. It was the result of a riff that Green had, which the band "Neck Deep-ified it", according to Barlow. Discussing the track, Barlow said "There have been times where I've wished I didn't have this pressure on me, and that I was a normal person". "Parachute" started out as a demo under the name "Britpop". Barlow said the group wanted the track "to have a massive festival feel" to it. "In Bloom" was the first track written for the album, written around six months following the release of Life's Not Out to Get You. Barlow said the song "kickstarted the whole creative process". It started out as an acoustic song, before eventually becoming a full-band track. Barlow said it "set the bar and tone" for the remainder of the album. He added that it was "pretty down-tempo for us, yet it builds and climaxes in one of my favourite arrangements we’ve ever created". Barlow considers it "unique" as it contains an instrumental middle 8 section, something the group had not done before. He explained that they intentionally left it as an instrumental so that people could "dance and feel the song."

"Don't Wait", which was written by drummer Dani Washington, was viewed by Barlow a "more of a political song" than "Happy Judgement Day". The group initially turned down the idea of having guest musicians, "but later we were sat in the studio and I had the brainwave of having Sam Carter. He really put his stamp on it." The majority of lyrics on "Critical Mistake" were written by bassist Fil Thorpe-Evans. Barlow originally sent him an acoustic version of the track with a "driving chorus that we all liked". His brother "being the wizard that he is" turned it into a full-band track with a Weezer feel to it, something that "we definitely wanted to touch upon". With assistance from Barlow, Thorpe-Evans wrote "Wish You Were Here" about a friend who had died following a car crash. Thorpe-Evans said he "really struggled dealing with those things ... even talking about it with family is really hard". He did, however, find it easier to write about it in a song "because you can say what you want to say properly and decide what matters most". Thorpe-Evans wrote the music, as well as the verses, while Barlow wrote the chorus.

While working on "Heavy Lies" in the studio, Sebastian Barlow went out to get coffee. By the time he returned, Ben Barlow and Bowden wrote a chorus for the track. Barlow said they the group had a "tendency to be very wordy, so it was satisfying to have a chorus that was simple and effective". "19 Seventy Sumthin'", which was written on the group's tour with A Day to Remember, details the story from how Barlow's parents got together until his father's death. Barlow, who was "having a moment", picked up a guitar and "As soon as I sang the first couple of lyrics, I knew it was going to be something special". Barlow said writing it felt like "the best therapy. That was the song I felt I had to write and it was going to come out of me at some point. I wanted to make sure I got it absolutely right." "Where Do We Go When We Go" was written in Sebastian Barlow's room. He was trying to come up with "ways to make a chorus more interesting", according to Ben Barlow. Usually, the chorus is "this big, bouncy ‘moment’", however, Sebastian "wanted to make the verses super-drive-y, and the chorus take a step back" according to Ben. Barlow said it "summarizes our mood well. Very directly, the message is: “Fuck all this shit, fuck all the noise, let’s just make something of ourselves before our time is up.”"

== Artwork ==
The illustration and design was created by Ryan Besch. According to Barlow, the main part of the artwork shows "being on a tightrope between 'The Peace' and 'The Panic' – trying to find the balance between the good and the bad". Barlow said this was a reference to "The Grand Delusion", as well as "The Grand Delusion Hotel ... [a] more explicit reference to the song". Barlow mentioned there were references to their past work, specifically naming Ned's Diner, which refers to Ned the Head, the character on the artwork of the Rain in July (2012) EP. In addition, Barlow said they've had a character on each of their releases: the aforementioned Ned, a saber-toothed tiger on the A History of Bad Decisions (2013) EP, Zoltar on Wishful Thinking (2014) "and now... this guy", referring to the man on the artwork. He added, "I think we've personally decided that this guy is also Ned". A logo for the fictional label Terry Barlow Records is featured on the artwork. Barlow said that including it on the artwork "is sick! Obviously actual record labels want to be represented on your album artwork, but we said, 'Hey now, this is something personal,' and we fought for it".

== Release ==
On 25 April 2017, in a Facebook post, the band said their next phase would begin "real soon". In addition, they posted a tweet for what was presumed to be a video shoot. In mid-May, the band supported All Time Low on their tour of Australia. On 19 May, the band posted a teaser video with the caption "THEPANIC". Two days later, The Peace and the Panic was announced for release in August. The album's track listing and artwork was revealed, and music videos for "Where Do We Go When We Go" and "Happy Judgement Day" were released. "Where Do We Go When We Go" was directed by Anthem Films, while "Happy Judgement Day" was directed by Dan Fusselman. Ashley Laderer of Alternative Press said the "Happy Judgement Day" video featured "Uniformed students cut loose, dance and throw papers as the band turns the class snooze-fest into a banger." The following week, the band performed at Slam Dunk Festival. Between mid-June and early August, the band performed on the Journey's Right Foot Stage at Warped Tour. On 12 July, a music video was released for "Motion Sickness". The video, which was directed by Elliott Ingham, was filmed while the album was being recorded and features footage from Slam Dunk Festival. The band said that while the song was "so upbeat and energetic", they did not want the video to be "too serious, so we just hung out on our days off from the studio and stitched all the footage together." On 13 August, a music video was released for "In Bloom", directed by Lewis Cater.

The Peace and the Panic was released on 18 August 2017 through independent label Hopeless Records. The HMV edition of the album features "Beautiful Madness" and "Worth It" as bonus tracks. To promote the album's release, the band did a series of in-store acoustic performances and signing events in the US and the UK. They appeared at the Reading and Leeds Festivals that same month, before embarking on a headlining UK tour with support from As It Is, Real Friends and Woes in October, followed by a mainland European leg with support from As It Is, Real Friends and Blood Youth. The Nottingham date of trek was cancelled due to issues with security personnel, with a new date being set for November. That same month, the band appeared at BBC Radio 1's Radio 1 Rocks event, which saw them perform "Don't Wait" with Carter and cover "Welcome to Paradise" (1991) by Green Day. On 10 November, a music video was released for "Parachute".

In January and February 2018, Neck Deep toured across North America, with support from Seaway, Speak Low If You Speak Love and Creeper. Following an appearance at Download Festival in Australia, Neck Deep made their TV debut appearing on Last Call with Carson Daly, where they performed "In Bloom" and "Where Do We Go When We Go". They then appeared at the Download Festival. On 1 August 2018, two new versions of "In Bloom" were release, one featuring Saxl Rose and an acoustic rendition. In September and October 2018, the band toured the US again, with support from Trophy Eyes, WSTR, Stand Atlantic and Gardenside. Shortly before the trek began, bassist Fil Thorpe-Evans left the band on mutual terms. They went on a short tour of Australia in November and December 2018 to close out the year. On 14 January 2019, the band announced that their upcoming tours would feature saxophonist Tony. They then went on a short tour of mainland Europe with support from Parting Gift, prior to supporting Don Broco on their headlining arena tour of the UK the following month.

== Reception ==
Professional ratings
Review scores
Source	Rating
AllMusic	3.5/5 stars
Rock Sound	8/10

Before release, Alternative Press included the album on their list of the most anticipated albums of the year.

The Peace and the Panic debuted at number four on the Billboard 200 in the US, selling 32,000 album-equivalent units, 29,000 of which were from pure sales. The single "In Bloom" received a Kerrang! Award in June 2018 for Best Song. Cleveland.com ranked "In Bloom" at number 17 on their list of the top 100 pop-punk songs.

== Track listing ==
Writing credits per booklet.

All tracks are written by Neck Deep with Sebastian Barlow and Mike Green.

No.	Title	Writer(s)	Length
1.	"Motion Sickness"	Neck Deep, Sebastian Barlow, Mike Green	3:26
2.	"Happy Judgement Day"	Neck Deep, Green	3:33
3.	"The Grand Delusion"	Neck Deep, Green	3:27
4.	"Parachute"	Neck Deep, Barlow, Green	3:41
5.	"In Bloom"	Neck Deep, Barlow	3:40
6.	"Don't Wait" (featuring Sam Carter)	Neck Deep	3:18
7.	"Critical Mistake"	Neck Deep	3:16
8.	"Wish You Were Here"	Neck Deep	4:08
9.	"Heavy Lies"	Neck Deep, Barlow	3:30
10.	"19 Seventy Sumthin'"	Neck Deep, Green	3:58
11.	"Where Do We Go When We Go"	Neck Deep, Barlow	3:37
Total length:			39:34

HMV/Target exclusive bonus tracks
No.	Title	Writer(s)	Length
12.	"Beautiful Madness"	Neck Deep, Green	3:09
13.	"Worth It"	Neck Deep	3:24
Total length:			46:07

== Personnel ==
Personnel per booklet.

Neck Deep

- Ben Barlow – lead vocals
- Sam Bowden – lead guitar
- Fil Thorpe-Evans - bass, backing vocals, co-lead vocals and acoustic guitar on track 8
- Dani Washington – drums
- Matt West – rhythm guitar

Additional musicians

- Sam Carter of Architects – guest vocals on "Don't Wait"
- Ella Jones – intro vocals on "Where Do We Go When We Go"
- Evie Jones – intro vocals on "Where Do We Go When We Go"
- Finlay Jones – intro vocals on "Where Do We Go When We Go"
- Darcy Jones – intro vocals on "Where Do We Go When We Go"
- Laura Whiteside – intro on "Critical Mistake"

Production

- Mike Green – producer, recording, mixing (tracks 3, 12 and 13)
- Will McCoy – assistant engineer
- Colin Schwanke – assistant engineer
- Neal Avron – mixing (except for tracks 3, 12 and 13)
- Ted Jensen – mastering

Artwork

- Ryan Besch – illustration, design

== Charts ==
Chart (2017)	Peak position
Australian Albums (ARIA)	8
Austrian Albums (Ö3 Austria)	70
Belgian Albums (Ultratop Flanders)	39
Canadian Albums (Billboard)	51
Dutch Albums (Album Top 100)	164
New Zealand Heatseekers Albums (RMNZ)	4
Scottish Albums (OCC)	4
UK Albums (OCC)	4
UK Independent Albums (OCC)	1
UK Rock & Metal Albums (OCC)	1
US Billboard 200	4
US Independent Albums (Billboard)	2
US Top Rock Albums (Billboard)	2

== Certifications ==
Region	Certification	Certified units/sales
United Kingdom (BPI)	Silver	60,000^{‡}
^{‡} Sales+streaming figures based on certification alone.
