= Up in Smoke (disambiguation) =

Up in Smoke is a 1978 film featuring Cheech and Chong.

Up in Smoke may also refer to:

- Up in Smoke (album), the soundtrack to the 1978 film, or the title track also covered by Hank Williams III
- Up in Smoke (album), a 1995 album by Indo G and Lil' Blunt
- Up in Smoke (1957 film), starring the comedy team of The Bowery Boys
- "Up in Smoke" (CSI: Crime Scene Investigation), a sixth-season episode of CSI: Crime Scene Investigation
- "Up in Smoke" (NCIS), a ninth-season episode of NCIS
- Up in Smoke Tour, a West Coast hip hop tour which took place in 2000
- Up in Smoke, an alternate name used by the professional wrestling tag team Cheech and Cloudy
- "Up in Smoke", a song by Hollywood Undead from Notes from the Underground
- "Up in Smoke", a song by Lower Than Atlantis from World Record
- "Up in Smoke", a song by Neck Deep from A History of Bad Decisions
