= Visions of Another Hell =

Studio album by Blood Youth
- Released: 1 October 2021
- Genres: Hardcore punk; nu metal; metalcore
- Length: 47:30
- Label: Rude
- Producers: Robin Adams; Chris Pritchard; Ermin Hamidovic

Blood Youth chronology
Starve (2019)	Visions of Another Hell (2021)

Singles from Visions of Another Hell
- 1. "Iron Lung" Released: 28 June 2021; 2. "Cells" Released: 23 July 2021; 3. "Body Of Wire" Released: 25 August 2021; 4. "Colony3" Released: 3 September 2021; 5. "Something to Numb the Pain" Released: 19 September 2021

Visions of Another Hell is the third studio album by British hardcore punk band Blood Youth, which was released on 1 October 2021, through Rude Records. It is the last release by the band to include former vocalist Kaya Tarsus, who left the band shortly before the album's release.

== Release ==
On 28 June 2021, the band released the single "Iron Lung", Around this time it was announced that drummer Sam Hallett was no longer a member of the band and that he had been replaced by new drummer Brad Ratcliffe. On 23 July, they released the single "Cells". On 25 August, they released the single "Body of Wire". On 2 September, they released the single "Colony3". On 19 September, they released the single "Something To Numb The Pain".

After performing at the 2021 Slam Dunk Festival, vocalist Kaya Tarsus departed from the group. On 6 September 2021, former God Complex vocalist Harry Rule was announced as the band's new lead vocalist. From 15 to 26 September 2021, they toured the UK on a headline tour, supported by Death Blooms. On 30 September, the band announced that Visions of Another Hell would be released the following day, 1 October 2021.

== Musical style ==
Callum McMillan of Bring the Noise UK compared the album's sound to Slipknot and early Korn, saying the band have "embraced both classic nu-metal style riffage and modern production".

== Reception ==
Professional ratings
Review scores
Source	Rating
Distorted Sound Magazine	9/10
Kerrang!	4/5 stars
Metal Hammer	4.5/5 stars
Rock Sins	7/10

The album received generally positive reviews, with Dan McHugh of Distorted Sound Magazine saying "it is arguably their strongest and most dynamic material to date", while Emma Wilkes of Kerrang! said "Visions of Another Hell is a formidable final chapter of [Kaya's] era that balances brutality with intricacy with phenomenal results".

== Track listing ==
No.	Title	Length
1.	"a-LTX"	3:44
2.	"Iron Lung"	4:20
3.	"Something to Numb the Pain"	3:50
4.	"Cells"	5:03
5.	"Body of Wire"	3:30
6.	"Colony3"	3:51
7.	"Open Window"	3:50
8.	"Synthetic"	4:16
9.	"Human Blur"	3:43
10.	"Kept in a Box"	3:54
11.	"Dogma"	7:39
Total length:		47:30

== Personnel ==
Blood Youth

- Kaya Tarsus – vocals
- Chris Pritchard – guitar
- Matt Hollinson – bass
- Sam Hallett – drums

Production

- Robin Adams – production, engineering, mixing
- Chris Pritchard – production
- Ermin Hamidovic – mastering

Additional personnel

- Luk Hope – artwork
