= Neck Deep (album) =

Studio album by Neck Deep
- Released: 19 January 2024
- Genre: Pop-punk
- Length: 33:13
- Label: Hopeless
- Producer: Seb Barlow

Neck Deep chronology
| All Distortions Are Intentional (2020) | Neck Deep (2024) |

Singles from Neck Deep
- 1. "Heartbreak of the Century" Released: 15 February 2023; 2. "Take Me with You" Released: 9 August 2023; 3. "It Won't Be Like This Forever" Released: 27 September 2023; 4. "We Need More Bricks" Released: 16 November 2023

Singles from Neck Deep (Dumbfuck Edition)
- 1. "STFU" Released: May 26, 2022; 2. "You Should See Me Now" Released: May 21, 2025

Neck Deep is the fifth studio album by Welsh pop-punk band Neck Deep. It was released on 19 January 2024, through Hopeless Records.

== Background ==
Most of the album was recorded in the band's own studio in Wrexham, Wales, besides the drums, which were recorded in Treehouse Studio in England. It was mixed by Sam Guaiana in Los Angeles, California. This is the band's first album without original drummer Dani Washington, as he left the band in May 2022. He was replaced by the band's long time drum technician Matt Powles. The album is produced and engineered by bassist Seb Barlow. This is the first time he has produced and engineered a Neck Deep album since their 2014 debut studio album, Wishful Thinking. The lead single, "Heartbreak of the Century", was released on 15 February 2023, along with a music video.

On 9 August 2023, the second single, "Take Me with You" was released, along with a music video. On the same date, frontman Ben Barlow announced that the band would be performing at the Alexandra Palace in London, England, on 28 March 2024, with Knuckle Puck, and Drain.

The album was officially announced on 27 September 2023, along with the release of the third single, "It Won't Be Like This Forever" and its music video. The fourth single, "We Need More Bricks", was released on 16 November 2023. A music video for "Dumbstruck Dumbfuckk" came out on 18 January 2024.

On 13 November 2023, it was announced that the band would be playing at the When We Were Young festival on 19 October 2024.

The band toured throughout the United States in support of the album with Drain, Bearings, and Higher Power. The tour started at Marathon Music Works in Nashville, Tennessee, on 25 January 2024, and ended at The Salt Shed in Chicago, Illinois on 25 February 2024.

A music video for "Sort Yourself Out" came out on 23 August 2024.

The band released a single, "You Should See Me Now", on 21 May 2025. The single was then featured on the deluxe version of their self-titled album alongside "STFU" and live versions of "Dumbstruck Dumbfuck" and "Take Me With You" from their show in Barcelona, Spain, released on 12 September 2025.

== Critic reception ==
Professional ratings
Review scores
| Source | Rating |
|---|---|
| Kerrang! | 4/5 stars |
| New Noise Magazine | 4/5 stars |
| Sputnikmusic | 2.8/5 stars |
| Still Listening | 60/100 |

The album mainly received mixed reviews from critics.

== Track listing ==
All tracks are written by Ben Barlow, Seb Barlow, Sam Bowden, Matt Powles, and Matthew West.

Neck Deep track listing
| No. | Title | Length |
|---|---|---|
| 1. | "Dumbstruck Dumbfuck" | 2:58 |
| 2. | "Sort Yourself Out" | 3:13 |
| 3. | "This Is All My Fault" | 3:09 |
| 4. | "We Need More Bricks" | 3:48 |
| 5. | "Heartbreak of the Century" | 3:49 |
| 6. | "Go Outside!" | 3:07 |
| 7. | "Take Me with You" | 3:17 |
| 8. | "They May Not Mean To (But They Do)" | 3:08 |
| 9. | "It Won't Be Like This Forever" | 3:27 |
| 10. | "Moody Weirdo" | 3:17 |
| Total length: | | 33:13 |

Neck Deep (Dumbfuck Edition) track listing
| No. | Title | Length |
|---|---|---|
| 11. | "You Should See Me Now" | 3:44 |
| 12. | "STFU" | 2:52 |
| 13. | "Dumbstruck Dumbfuck" (Live in Barcelona) | 3:04 |
| 14. | "Take Me With You" (Live in Barcelona) | 3:21 |
| Total length: | | 46:14 |

== Personnel ==
Neck Deep

- Ben Barlow – lead vocals
- Sam Bowden – lead guitar
- Matt West – rhythm guitar
- Seb Barlow – bass guitar, backing vocals, production, engineering
- Matt Powles – drums, percussion

Additional contributors

- Mike Kalajian – mastering
- Sam Guaiana – mixing
- Carl Bown – drum engineering
- Evan Weselmann – artwork

== Charts ==
Chart performance for Neck Deep
| Chart (2024) | Peak position |
|---|---|
| Australian Albums (ARIA) | 22 |
| Scottish Albums (OCC) | 4 |
| UK Albums (OCC) | 11 |
| UK Independent Albums (OCC) | 2 |
| UK Rock & Metal Albums (OCC) | 3 |
