= Climates (band) =

British melodic hardcore band

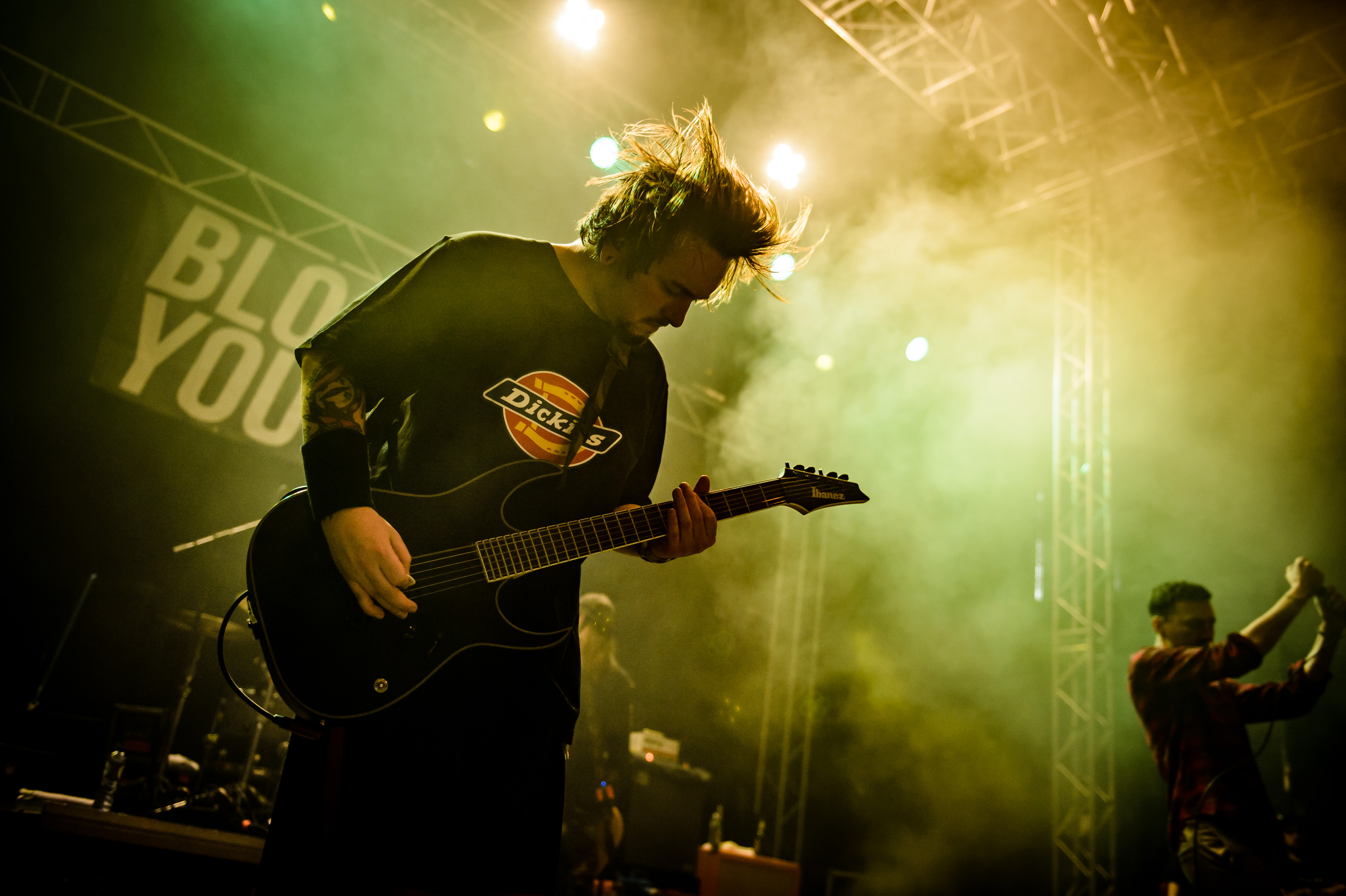
- Chris Pritchard performing with Blood Youth in 2018

Background information
- Origin: Lincoln, England
- Genres: Melodic hardcore; post-hardcore; hardcore punk; heavy metal
- Years active: 2011–2014
- Label: Artery Recordings
- Spinoffs: Blood Youth; Neck Deep; Napoleon
- Past members: Wesley Thompson; Sam Bowden; Fil Thorpe Evans; Josh Geeson; Max Dawson; Harley Clifton; Chris Pritchard; Henry Othen; Matt Powells

Climates were a British melodic hardcore band formed in 2011 in Lincoln, England, by Wesley Thompson, Sam Bowden, Fil Thorpe Evans, Harley Clifton and Henry Othen.

Evans departed in early 2013 to join Neck Deep full-time and Clifton and Othen both departed in 2012. The firing of Thompson in 2014 lead to the bands eventual break up (from which Bowden, Powels, Pritchard and Dawson recruited Kaya Tarsus forming Blood Youth).

== Musical style ==
Climates' musical style has been described as melodic hardcore, hardcore punk, post-hardcore, and heavy metal.

They cited influences including Counterparts and Alexisonfire.

== Members ==
=== Final line-up ===
- Wesley Thompson – lead vocals (2011–2014)
- Sam Bowden – guitar (2011–2014)
- Max Dawson – guitar (2013–2014) bass (2013)
- Chris Pritchard – bass (2013; 2014)
- Matt Powels – drums (2012–2014)

=== Past members ===
- Fil Thorpe Evans – guitar (2011–2012)
- Josh Geeson – guitar (2013)
- Harley Clifton – bass (2011–2012)
- Henry Othen – drums (2011–2012)

== Discography ==
Title	Album details	Type
What Means the Most	Released: 6 August 2012; Label: Self-Released	EP
Body Clocks	Released: 13 October 2014; Label: Small Town Records (UK), Artery Recordings (International)	LP

=== Singles ===
Title	Details
"Waiting To Exhale"	Released: 29 March 2012; Label: Self-Released
"Reconcile"	Released: 26 December 2012; Label: Self-Released
