= All Distortions Are Intentional =

Studio album by Neck Deep
- Released: 24 July 2020
- Recorded: November – December 2019
- Studio: Monnow Valley Studio, Wales
- Genre: Pop punk; alternative rock; pop rock
- Length: 39:35
- Label: Hopeless
- Producer: Matt Squire

Neck Deep chronology
The Peace and the Panic (2017)	All Distortions Are Intentional (2020)	Neck Deep (2024)

Singles from All Distortions Are Intentional
- 1. "Lowlife" Released: 28 February 2020; 2. "When You Know" Released: 13 April 2020; 3. "Fall" Released: 17 June 2020; 4. "I Revolve (Around You)" Released: 16 July 2020; 5. "Sick Joke" Released: 20 July 2020

All Distortions Are Intentional is the fourth studio album by Welsh pop punk band Neck Deep, released on 24 July 2020 by Hopeless Records. It was produced by Matt Squire and mixed by Seb Barlow. It is the first album to not feature bassist Fil Thorpe-Evans, who left in the fall of 2018 and the last to feature original member and drummer Dani Washington before his departure in 2022. The band's photographer Joshua Halling recorded bass on all tracks on this album. He ultimately decided not to join the band full-time and was later replaced by Seb Barlow, longtime collaborator of the band and brother of frontman Ben Barlow.

Billed as a concept album, its story takes place in Sonderland—an exaggerated portrayal of society inhabited by lead characters Jett and Alice, who together deal with issues of love, loss, disillusionment and despair. The album also marks a significant departure from the bands more pop-punk leaning sound featured on their previous albums in favor of a more alternative rock and pop rock inspired sound.

Five singles were released to promote the album accompanied with music videos: "Lowlife", "When You Know", "Fall", "I Revolve (Around You)" and "Sick Joke".

== Background ==
Neck Deep released their third studio album The Peace and the Panic in August 2017 through Hopeless Records. They promoted it with headlining tours of the UK, US (twice) and Australia, in addition to supporting slot for Don Broco on their UK arena tour; in between this, bassist Fil Thorpe-Evans left the band on mutual terms in September 2018. In April 2019, vocalist Ben Barlow said that they were beginning to writing their next album, which was expected to take up to a year to do. He added that he wished to talk about political issues, citing the 1975's work as a template. Neck Deep released the non-album single "She's a God" in June 2019. Between June and September 2019, they supported Blink-182 and Lil Wayne on those acts' co-headlining North American tour, and played a few headlining shows along the trek. Bookended these dates, Neck Deep appeared at Riot Fest and one of Warped Tour's 25th anniversary shows.

All Distortions Are Intentional is thematically about the character Jett, a loner, who lives in the fictional location of Sonderland, a portmanteau of "wonderland" and "sonder". Alternative Press said the latter word is the "realization of random people living a life as complex as your own with their own ambitions."

== Release ==
Following a teaser on Twitter, Neck Deep released an application, which included an invite to an event titled Sonderland, on 13 February 2020. Alongside this, the band announced that Ben's brother Seb Barlow, who has been writing and producing material for them since their formation, had become an official member. On 28 February 2020, All Distortions Are Intentional was announced for released in five months' time, and its track listing and artwork were posted online. A music video was released for "Lowlife" on the same day, made by YHELLOW. It was followed by a video for "When You Know" on 13 April 2020. Due to the COVID-19 pandemic, the band were unable to shoot a music video for it; they subsequently asked fans to film themselves miming to the lyrics. It includes cameos from members of the bands Roam, Simple Plan and State Champs, among others. The video for "Fall" premiered through Neck Deep's Twitch account before being posted online on 17 June 2020. It features footage of skaters, a sport that the band felt was underrated and wanted to highlight, cut with scenes of themselves on tour. In November and December 2021, Neck Deep embarked on a tour of the US. They were due to go on a UK tour, with Nothing,Nowhere and Higher Power in September 2020, but this was moved to early 2021 and then to early 2022 because of the pandemic.

== Critical reception ==
Professional ratings
Review scores
Source	Rating
Dead Press!	8/10 stars
Exclaim!	8/10
Kerrang!	4/5 stars
NME	3/5 stars

All Distortions Are Intentional has received generally positive reviews from music critics. Exclaim!'s Eva Zhu considers that it "might be the band's best work".

== Track listing ==
All tracks are written by Neck Deep and Sebastian Barlow.

No.	Title	Length
1.	"Sonderland"	3:39
2.	"Fall"	3:34
3.	"Lowlife"	3:09
4.	"Telling Stories"	3:19
5.	"When You Know"	3:09
6.	"Quarry"	1:26
7.	"Sick Joke"	3:47
8.	"What Took You So Long"	3:33
9.	"Empty House"	3:34
10.	"Little Dove"	3:04
11.	"I Revolve (Around You)"	3:38
12.	"Pushing Daisies"	3:43
Total length:		39:35

== Personnel ==
Neck Deep

- Ben Barlow – lead vocals
- Sam Bowden – lead guitar
- Matt West – rhythm guitar
- Joshua Halling – bass guitar
- Dani Washington – drums

Production

- Matt Squire – producer
- Seb Barlow – mix engineer

Design

- Tom Noon – album artwork

== Charts ==
Chart performance for All Distortions Are Intentional
Chart (2020)	Peak position
Australian Albums (ARIA)	46
Scottish Albums (OCC)	3
UK Albums (OCC)	4
UK Independent Albums (OCC)	1
UK Rock & Metal Albums (OCC)	1
US Billboard 200	64
US Independent Albums (Billboard)	10
US Top Rock Albums (Billboard)	7
