= In Bloom (Neck Deep song) =

2017 single by Neck Deep

Single by Neck Deep

from the album The Peace and the Panic
- Released: 13 August 2017
- Recorded: 2017
- Genre: Pop rock; alternative rock
- Length: 3:38
- Label: Hopeless Records
- Songwriter(s): Ben Barlow
- Producer(s): Mike Green

Neck Deep singles chronology
"Motion Sickness" (2017)	"In Bloom" (2017)	"Parachute" (2017)

"In Bloom" is a song by the Welsh pop punk band Neck Deep, released as the fourth single from the group's third studio album The Peace and the Panic. The track peaked at 39 on the UK Rock & Metal Singles Chart following the album's release and later won the 2018 Kerrang! Award for Best Song.

The music video was directed by Lewis Cater and was released concurrently with the single.

== Personnel ==
Personnel per booklet.

- Ben Barlow – lead vocals
- Sam Bowden – lead guitar
- Fil Thorpe-Evans - bass, backing vocals
- Dani Washington – drums
- Matt West – rhythm guitar
