= Neck Deep =

Welsh pop-punk band

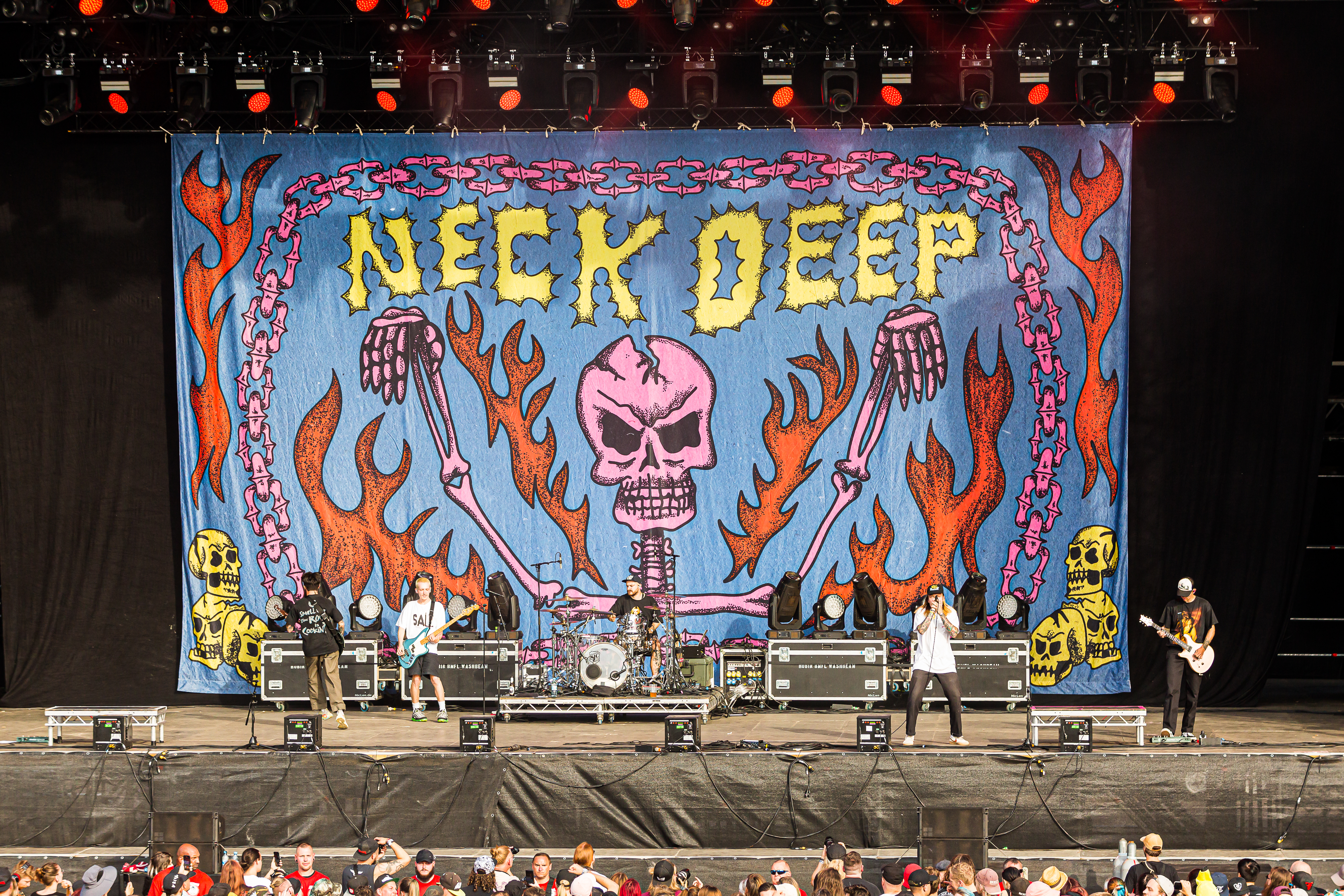
- Neck Deep performing at Full Force in 2022

Background information
- Origin: Wrexham, Wales
- Genre: Pop-punk
- Years active: 2012–present
- Labels: We Are Triumphant; Pinky Swear; Hopeless
- Spinoff of: Spires; Climates
- Members: Ben Barlow; Matt West; Sam Bowden; Seb Barlow; Matt Powles
- Past members: Lloyd Roberts; Fil Thorpe-Evans; Joshua Halling; Dani Washington
- Website: neckdeepuk.com

Neck Deep are a Welsh pop-punk band formed in Wrexham in 2012. They released a pair of EPs, Rain in July (2012) and A History of Bad Decisions (2013), before signing with Hopeless Records in August 2013.

Neck Deep was founded after vocalist Ben Barlow met former lead guitarist Lloyd Roberts; the pair posted a song ("What Did You Expect?") online under the name Neck Deep. The song soon gained attention online, resulting in the addition of rhythm guitarist Matt West, drummer Dani Washington/Abasi, and bassist Fil Thorpe-Evans.

After the release of their debut album Wishful Thinking in January 2014, the band became a full-time project, with the band members leaving their jobs and/or dropping out of university courses. Shortly after the release of their second album Life's Not out to Get You in August 2015, Roberts left the band due to allegations of sexual misconduct (which he was subsequently found to have no case to answer), and Sam Bowden (formerly of Climates and Blood Youth) joined in his place. The group's third album The Peace and the Panic was released August 2017, and debuted at No. 4 on the US Billboard 200. In September 2018, Thorpe-Evans left the band to pursue a solo career as a producer. In 2019, the band embarked in a summer tour with Blink-182 as the opening act. By February 2020, the band added longtime collaborator and bassist Seb Barlow as an official member; later that month, they also revealed an app with a variety of multimedia regarding the announcement of their fourth album, titled All Distortions Are Intentional, released 24 July 2020. Their self-titled fifth album was released on 19 January 2024.

== History ==
=== Formation and EP releases (2012–2013) ===
Vocalist Ben Barlow met lead guitarist Lloyd Roberts when Barlow's older brother, Seb, was recording the Wrexham hardcore band Spires in which Roberts played. At the time, Ben Barlow wrote pop punk songs on his own for fun. On 19 April 2012 the duo posted the song "What Did You Expect?" online under the name Neck Deep. According to Roberts, Barlow "literally said, 'What about Neck Deep [as the band name]?' and that was that." The name comes from the Crucial Dudes' song "Boom, Roasted". "What Did You Expect?" soon gained attention online. This resulted in the duo adding guitarist Matt West, who also played in Spires, and drummer Dani Washington, who was aware of Wrexham's local music scene. Bassist Fil Thorpe-Evans joined shortly after leaving melodic hardcore band Climates from Lincoln, England. "I Couldn't Wait to Leave 6 Months Ago " was posted online on 8 June. On 11 June, it was announced the band had signed to U.S. label We Are Triumphant. The band recorded more songs with Seb Barlow in the attic of Ben's home.

The band released an EP, Rain in July, in September 2012, which gained the band even more attention from people. According to Barlow, "People took notice and demanded that we play shows." The band supported With the Punches and Me Vs Hero in the UK in December. The December 3rd date of the tour was the band's live debut. At their second show the band signed with a manager. The band toured the UK supporting Hacktivist in February 2013. Also in February the band released the A History of Bad Decisions EP as a "pay what you want" download. The band and their tour manager went on a holiday to Florida. The group ended up playing two shows that were "crazy and sold out and packed", according to Thorpe-Evans. Videos of the shows ended up online, which were seen by Hopeless Records. Hopeless got in contact with the band's manager who put the label in contact with the band. The band signed to Hopeless in August 2013. Being signed to the label was "a dream come true" for the band.

=== Wishful Thinking, Life's Not out to Get You, line-up changes (2014–2016) ===
The band released their debut album, Wishful Thinking, on 14 January 2014. Up until this point, the band was a "fun, part-time [entity]", according to Barlow. With the release of the album, the band became a full-time thing, according to Barlow: "Fuck it, let's do this properly". The success of the album resulted in Thorpe-Evans, West and Roberts quitting their jobs, Washington turning down a place at the Academy of Contemporary Music and Barlow dropping out of university. After the release of Wishful Thinking, Neck Deep began 2014 with a full UK headline tour and also toured the UK as the main support for We Are the In Crowd, before a headline tour covering the US with Knuckle Puck, Light Years and Misguided by Giants. The band were announced to perform on 2014 edition of Vans Warped Tour. The band's two EPs were remixed and remastered as part of the compilation Rain in July / A History of Bad Decisions, released on Hopeless on 17 June. It was released to capitalise on the band's popularity at the time. Barlow said that this compilation would be "definitive release of [these] songs". The band hoped that the new fans that enjoyed Wishful Thinking "will enjoy the chance to check these songs out now that we've had a chance to improve how they sound!" The band won the Kerrang! Award for Best British Newcomer 2014, beating nominees Blitz Kids, Bury Tomorrow, Lonely the Brave, and Decade. The band headlined the Intercontinental Championships Tour, along with Knuckle Puck (USA), Seaway (Canada) and Trophy Eyes (Australia), and touring the UK. The tour was set to start January 2015 and run through February. In late 2014, they entered the studio with producers Andrew Wade and Jeremy McKinnon to record their second album.

On 27 April 2015 the band made a post on their Facebook page consisting of nothing more than "Can't Kick Up the Roots. 12.05.15". This post turned out to be a song and the release date of 12 May. A few days later on 4 May, the band made another Facebook post stating the name of their new album, Life's Not out to Get You. The release date of this album was 14 August. On 10 May, "Can't Kick Up the Roots" premiered on UK radio station BBC Radio 1 and was met with much praise by fans, with the band then stating that the song's music video and pre-orders for the album would be available on 12 May. The band played all dates of the 2015 edition of Vans Warped Tour. On 19 July, "Gold Steps" was premiered live on Daniel P. Carter's BBC Radio 1 rock show. The album made No.10 on Billboard's Top Album Sales list, and the band made No. 67 on the Artist 100 list.

On 22 August 2015, allegations of sexual misconduct against guitarist Lloyd Roberts were made, as well as bassist Fil-Thorpe, in which Roberts was accused of sending inappropriate photos to an underage girl. Roberts denied these allegations. The band responded that they were aware of the situation and asked for "a moment to get to the bottom of this." The next day, they clarified that Roberts would be "stepping down" from his position in the band as he did not want to tarnish the band's reputation as a result of these allegations. He said, "I’m now looking to put this horrendous chapter in my life behind me as I instead look forward to the future. For me, that means doing the one thing I love the most – writing and recording music." On 13 October 2015, Roberts released a statement which explained that the police had cleared him of all charges, stating that they "found no case" to back up the allegations made against him. In the same statement, Roberts hinted that there are no plans for him to return to the band. On 17 December 2015, Sam Bowden, of Climates and Blood Youth, officially joined the band as their new lead guitarist.

=== The Peace and the Panic (2016–2018) ===
On 27 June 2016, the band began writing new material for the band's third album. They began working on the album in the studio eight months after writing the band's new music on 21 February 2017. On 15 January 2017, the band's vocalist, Ben Barlow, stated that a band should always show progression in its music and they are certainly aware that is what they want to do in the band's third album. In an interview with the lead singer, Barlow explains how his father's passing influenced his motivation for writing Neck Deep's most recent album. Ben connects his father's death and the album by stating, "It's definitely opened my mind up creatively, it's gonna be a little ball of inspiration that I can kind of pick at, I guess." On 5 April 2017, the band finished the album and was set to release it on 18 August of the same year. On 21 May Neck Deep released two new songs along with music videos for them. "Where Do We Go When We Go" and "Happy Judgement Day". It was also announced the band worked with Neal Avron and Mike Green on their new album. Ben Barlow was quoted saying to Alternative Press "The Peace and the Panic is about how we’ve grown up and experienced life in the last couple of years.". He also commented on two of the new tracks on the album, including the track "Happy Judgement Day" of which Barlow commented that it "... is on the panic side, and really, that song is a comment on the current social and political climate.". He also stated "Where Do We Go When We Go" (featuring Ben's and Seb's nieces and nephews Darcy, Ella, Evie and Fin Jones) is the last track on the record, and we feel it summarises our mood well. Very directly, the message is: "Fuck all this shit, fuck all the noise, let’s just make something of ourselves before our time is up."

On 5 July 2017 in Charlotte, North Carolina the band gained attention on the Warped Tour when the members were reportedly under police lockdown due to a fatal shooting outside the bar they were in. The bassist of the band, Fil Thorpe-Evans, tweeted, "FYI last night a few of us were in a bar police lock down because there was a fatal shooting literally outside. Had to hide behind the bar". None of the band members were injured as the scene calmed down upon the arrival of the police.

Members of the band performed a DJ set at Emo Nite Day hosted by Emo Nite in Los Angeles in December 2017. On 4 September 2018, bassist Fil Thorpe-Evans announced the departure from the band. He said that Neck Deep has been a dream coming true but he wanted to pursue his career as a producer.

=== All Distortions Are Intentional (2019–2022) ===
The band released a new single entitled 'She's a God' on 27 June 2019 with new bassist Joshua Halling, who was the band's touring photographer. The band spent the summer of that year touring as support for Blink-182 and Lil Wayne. Wayne threatened to quit the tour due to the size of the crowds, saying "Please forgive me but I am so not used to performing to a crowd … and there’s not too many... that’s not my swag," he admitted. "I’m not sure how long I’m going to be able to do this tour, but make some noise for Blink-182 for including me anyway. This might be my last night, though. Let’s go!". Lil Wayne ended up confirming he was staying with Neck Deep and Blink-182 for the remainder of the tour, tweeting "I’m having too much fun with my bros blink-182."

In February 2020, Ben's brother Seb officially joined the band as bassist, after having been involved behind the scenes since day one. He replaced Joshua Halling who returned to being the band's photographer. However, Halling recorded all bass tracks on the upcoming album. On the same day, they unveiled the Neck Deep app, which features photos, videos, tour dates, and announcements. A header image reading "You are invited to Sonderland" with the dates 28/02/20 - 29/02/20 is featured prominently. Their tour was scheduled to be in the U.K. and in the United States throughout 2020 with their new album, All Distortions Are Intentional being released on 24 July 2020. However, the tour was postponed to the following year due to the COVID-19 Pandemic. The band released an EP Live From Lockdown featuring a 5-song set of "live" performances of their recent album.

On 10 May 2022, longtime drummer Dani Washington announced via the band's social media pages that he would be parting ways with the band after 10 years to pursue other ventures, being replaced by their long-time drum tech Matt Powles. On 26 May 2022, the band (now as free agents having recently split with Hopeless Records) released a new non-album single titled "STFU", along with a music video.

=== Neck Deep (2023–present) ===
The band released three new singles titled "Heartbreak Of The Century", "Take Me With You", and "It Won't Be Like This Forever" on 14 February, 8 August, and 27 September 2023 respectively, along with music videos. The band had been working under their own label TB Records, with exclusive license to Hopeless Records.

On 28 September 2023, frontman Ben Barlow announced their new album, self-titled Neck Deep, which was to be released on 19 January 2024. It was produced and engineered by bassist and Ben's brother Seb Barlow after the band's dissatisfaction with the album's initial production in Los Angeles, California, causing the delay in the album's release. The fourth single, titled "We Need More Bricks", was released on 15 November 2023. A music video for "Dumbstruck Dumbfuck" came out on 18 January 2024..

Neck Deep was officially released on 19 January 2024 via Hopeless Records, with several headline tours played over the next year to promote the new album, including their biggest headline show to date at Alexandra Palace in North London, England. The band released a single, "You Should See Me Now", on 21 May 2025. The single was then featured on the deluxe version of their self-titled album alongside "STFU" and live versions of "Dumbstruck Dumbfuck" and "Take Me With You" from their show in Barcelona, Spain released on 12 September 2025.

Neck Deep went on a UK headline tour in December 2025 to celebrate the 10-year anniversary of their album Life's Not Out To Get You.

== Musical style and influences ==
Neck Deep is a pop-punk band. Their sound has been described as being reminiscent of Blink-182, New Found Glory, the Wonder Years, Green Day, and the Descendents. Vocalist Ben Barlow said that A Day to Remember and Architects have been a massive influence on the band. The early Fall Out Boy work and Sum 41 have been cited as being influences.

== In popular culture ==
Neck Deep has two "Music Kits" included in Counter-Strike: Global Offensive. The Life's Not Out to Get You music kit was released as part of the Radicals music box on 8 November 2016, and The Lowlife Pack music kit was released on 18 March 2021. The Lowlife Pack music kit includes selections from All Distortions are Intentional.

== Band members ==
Current

- Ben Barlow – lead vocals (2012–present)
- Matt West – rhythm guitar (2012–present)
- Sam Bowden – lead guitar (2015–present)
- Seb Barlow – bass guitar, backing vocals (2020–present)
- Matt Powles – drums (2023–present, touring 2022–2023)

Former

- Lloyd Roberts – lead guitar (2012–2015)
- Fil Thorpe-Evans – bass guitar, backing vocals (2012–2018)
- Joshua Halling – bass guitar (2019–2020)
- Dani Washington – drums (2012–2022)

Touring

- Hannah Greenwood – backing vocals (2019)
- Saxl Rose – saxophone (2018–2019)

Timeline

== Discography ==
Studio albums

- Wishful Thinking (2014)
- Life's Not out to Get You (2015)
- The Peace and the Panic (2017)
- All Distortions Are Intentional (2020)
- Neck Deep (2024)

== Awards ==
Kerrang! Awards

Year	Nominee / work	Award	Result
2014	Neck Deep	Best British Newcomer	Won
2018	"In Bloom"	Best Single	Won

Alternative Press Music Awards

Year	Nominee / work	Award	Result
2016	Neck Deep	Best Live Band	Won

Rock Sound Awards

Year	Nominee / work	Award	Result
2017	Neck Deep	Best British Band	Won
