= Life's Not out to Get You =

Studio album by Neck Deep
- Released: 14 August 2015
- Recorded: 1 December 2014 – 21 January 2015
- Genre: Pop punk; punk rock
- Length: 36:17
- Label: Hopeless
- Producer: Jeremy McKinnon • Andrew Wade

Neck Deep chronology
Wishful Thinking (2014)	Life's Not out to Get You (2015)	The Peace and the Panic (2017)

Singles from Life's Not out to Get You
- 1. "Can't Kick Up the Roots" Released: 12 May 2015; 2. "Gold Steps" Released: 20 July 2015; 3. "Serpents" Released: 18 March 2016 (EP); 4. "December" Released: 18 July 2016

Life's Not out to Get You is the second studio album by Welsh pop punk band Neck Deep. Following the success of their debut album, Wishful Thinking (2014), the majority of the band members quit their day jobs and vocalist Ben Barlow dropped out of university. Working with Jeremy McKinnon, Andrew Wade and Tom Denney, the band recorded their second album between December 2014 and January 2015. Following recording, the band immediately went on tour.

Life's Not out to Get You was preceded by two singles: "Can't Kick Up the Roots" in May 2015 and "Gold Steps" in July. "Can't Kick Up the Roots" charted at number 16 in the UK on the Rock & Metal Singles chart. In early August, "Threat Level Midnight" was made available for streaming. It was released by Hopeless on 14 August. The album charted at number 8 in the UK, reached the top 20 in the US, and reached the top 40 in Ireland and Australia. It is the band’s final album to feature their full original lineup. Nine days after the release of the album, guitarist Lloyd Roberts left the band due to allegations of sexual misconduct, which were dropped soon after.

== Background ==
Neck Deep and their tour manager went on a holiday to Florida. The group ended up playing two shows that were "crazy and sold out and packed", according to bassist Fil Thorpe-Evans. Videos of the shows ended up online, which were seen by Hopeless. Hopeless got in contact with the band's manager who put the label in contact with the band. The band signed to Hopeless in August 2013. Being signed to the label was "a dream come true" for the band. The band released their debut album, Wishful Thinking, in January 2014. The success of the album resulted in the band moved from a "fun, part-time [entity]", as Barlow called it, to a full-time thing. Also due to the success, Thorpe-Evans, guitarists Matt West and Lloyd Roberts quitting their jobs, drummer Dani Washington turning down a place at the Academy of Contemporary Music and Barlow dropping out of university. In October and November 2014 the band supported Real Friends on their tour of the US.

== Composition ==
Neck Deep began writing new material as early as December 2013 prior to the release of Wishful Thinking. Vocalist Ben Barlow said Neck Deep wanted their second album to sound "bigger and better" than Wishful Thinking. Barlow claimed that the new album is what Wishful Thinking "should've been". While reassuring that it sounds like the band, he stated it was more "polished and rounded." Barlow said that the album "has the potential to cement a legacy for this band and to establish us as one of the best pop-punk bands in the world." All of the songs on the album were credited to Neck Deep with Seb Barlow, Andrew Wade, Tom Denney and Jeremy McKinnon.

The intro to "Citizens of Earth" features Thorpe-Evans breaking wind. "Can't Kick Up the Roots" is about Barlow's hometown, Wrexham, North Wales. Barlow mentioned that on one hand it is about how Wrexham "sucks" while on the other hand that is "what makes it ours." The "roots" part of name refers to the band's love of their hometown despite the flaws. The band wanted "Can't Kick Up the Roots" to be "a summer song" that "catch[es] people's ears straight away." "Kali Ma" is about a specific scene in the film Indiana Jones and the Temple of Doom (1984).

== Recording ==
Neck Deep demoed material on their tour bus while on the 2014 edition of Warped Tour. The band decided to move "out of our comfort zone" and worked "with someone we've always looked up to", Jeremy McKinnon of A Day to Remember. (Note: Guitarist Lloyd Roberts exclaimed after hearing A Day to Remember's Homesick (2009), "This is the greatest album ever!". "Now, [McKinnon is] just our mate Jez.") McKinnon's excitement stood out to the band: "not only is he someone who knows what they're doing" but looking forward to the album as much as the band were. McKinnon was working with Andrew Wade on The Ghost Inside's Dear Youth (2014) when Tom Denney had dropped by the studio. McKinnon had overheard Wade and Denney talking about having a meeting with Neck Deep to discuss their next album.

The trio had met up with bassist Fil Thorpe-Evans and "we all hit it off", according to McKinnon. Eventually, Neck Deep contacted the trio to tell them that they were chosen. On 1 December 2014 it was announced the band had started recording, and on 21 January 2015 it was announced the band had finished recording. The group had entered the studio with 20 songs; they ended up with 12 songs on the finished version of the album. (Note: "Threat Level Midnight" was recorded for Wishful Thinking, however, the band were unsure of where to place the song in the track listing. The song was nearly included as a bonus track for Wishful Thinking, instead it was re-recorded for Life's Not out to Get You.) Life's Not Out to Get You was produced by McKinnon and Wade. Wade also helped with recording and mixing, while McKinnon provided guest vocals on "Kali Ma". The album was mastered by Alan Douches. Shortly after the band finished recording they went on tour in January and February.

== Artwork and packaging ==
The artwork was created by Ricardo Cavolo. Barlow wanted the cover art to have a "really hand-drawn feel" to it and be "totally unlike any other artwork that's going on in the scene." The Devil depicted in the bottom-left handed cover is a comment on how a person should be making sure to not let the Devil on your shoulder win. Some of the items featured on the cover have been coincidences in relation to the lyrics as Cavolo made the art without hearing the album. For example, one of the songs on the album is titled "Serpents" and the art features snakes. Barlow and Cavolo created a comic book based on the artwork that includes lyrics from the album turned into the comic's story. The comic book was made available through pre-orders. The story features a character called June "who faces all these obstacles throughout his life". June's goal is to reach a house on a hill in spite of all the problems that might arise. Barlow claims that this is a metaphor "for the idea of always persevering and trying your best", a concept which is featured in the album. The album comes in a cardboard gatefold sleeve.

== Release ==
On 5 May 2015 Neck Deep announced their second album, Life's Not out to Get You, and revealed the track listing and artwork. On 11 May, "Can't Kick Up the Roots" was premiered on BBC Radio 1's Rock Show programme. A day later, a music video was released for the song, which was directed by Daniel Broadley. The music video was filmed back in March. On the same day, the song was released as a single. The band played on the 2015 edition of Warped Tour. "Gold Steps" was premiered on BBC Radio 1 on 19 July, and was released as a single a day later. A music video for the song was released on 21 July. It was directed by Kyle Thrash. On 10 August, "Threat Level Midnight" was made available for streaming. The album was released on 14 August through Hopeless. (Note: US Hopeless HR 21561) The HMV and Target editions of the album included three bonus tracks: a full band version of "December", and acoustic versions of "Can't Kick Up the Roots" and "Lime St.". A day later, the album was made available for streaming.

Following allegations of sexual misconduct towards a minor; on 23 August, Roberts parted ways with the band, not wanting the allegations to tarnish the band's reputation and also to focus on family life. The band supported All Time Low and Sleeping with Sirens in October and November on their Back to the Future Hearts Tour. The band supported Bring Me the Horizon in the UK in November. On 18 December, it was announced that Sam Bowden joined the band as Roberts' replacement. On 1 January 2016, a music video was released for "Smooth Seas Don't Make Good Sailors", which was filmed throughout 2015. On 27 January, a music video was released for "Kali Ma", directed by Elliott Ingham. The band went on a co-headlining UK tour with State Champs in February, with support from Creeper and Light Years. This would be followed by a tour of the US with support from Knuckle Puck and Like Pacific. On 10 March, a music video was released for "Serpents", directed by Miguel Barbosa.

On 18 March 2016, an EP was released featuring "Serpents" and "Can't Kick Up the Roots" as well as remixes of both songs by Mark Hoppus of Blink-182. The band toured the UK again in April with support from Creeper and WSTR. On 17 July, two new versions of "December" were released as a single – one featuring Hoppus and the other featuring Chris Carrabba of Dashboard Confessional.

== Critical reception ==
Professional ratings
Aggregate scores
Source	Rating
Metacritic	86/100
Review scores
Source	Rating
AllMusic	3.5/5 stars
Blunt Magazine	4.5/5
DIY	4/5 stars
Exclaim!	7/10
Kerrang	5/5 stars
Punknews.org	4.5/5 stars

Rock Sound editor Ryan Bird wrote that Life's Not out to Get You is the kind of "pop-punk album you just don't hear any more." Bird compared the music to early 2000s "through and through", and some of the songs to the likes of Sum 41 and New Found Glory. He noted that this sets the band apart from their peers. "Can't Kick Up the Roots", "Lime St." or "Kali Ma" could be classed as the "song of the summer". Bird mentioned Barlow's vocals have "never been better, sounding stronger, smoother and more controlled."

=== Accolades ===
The album was ranked at number 10 in Alternative Press's "10 Essential Records of 2015" list. Matt Crane of Alternative Press remarked "Ear-candy choruses [...] and touching acoustic ballads [...] make it rain pizza as far as the eye can see." The album was included at number 3 on Rock Sound's top 50 releases of 2015 list. Life's Not out to Get You was nominated for Album Of The Year at the 2016 Alternative Press Music Awards and for Best Album at the 2016 Kerrang! Awards.

=== Commercial performance ===
"Can't Kick Up the Roots" charted in the UK at number 9 on the Independent Singles Breakers chart, number 16 on the Rock & Metal Singles chart, and number 45 on the Independent Singles chart. Life's Not out to Get You sold 26,251 copies, charting at number 8 in the UK and number 17 in the US. It also charted at number 15 in Ireland, number 28 in Australia and number 87 in Belgium. "Can't Kick Up the Roots" was nominated for "Independent Track of the Year" at the Association of Independent Music awards. As of July 2020 the album has sold over 60,000 copies in the UK.

== Track listing ==
All tracks are written by Neck Deep with Seb Barlow, Andrew Wade, Tom Denney & Jeremy McKinnon

No.	Title	Writer(s)	Length
1.	"Citizens of Earth"	Neck Deep, Seb Barlow	2:40
2.	"Threat Level Midnight"	Neck Deep, S. Barlow	2:46
3.	"Can't Kick Up the Roots"	Neck Deep, S. Barlow, Andrew Wade	2:49
4.	"Kali Ma"	Neck Deep, S. Barlow, Wade, Jeremy McKinnon	2:50
5.	"Gold Steps"	Neck Deep, Tom Denney, Wade, McKinnon	3:12
6.	"Lime St."	Neck Deep, S. Barlow	3:19
7.	"Serpents"	Neck Deep, Denney, Wade, McKinnon	2:45
8.	"The Beach Is for Lovers (Not Lonely Losers)"	Neck Deep, S. Barlow, Wade, McKinnon	3:04
9.	"December"	Neck Deep, S. Barlow, Wade, McKinnon	3:38
10.	"Smooth Seas Don't Make Good Sailors"	Neck Deep, Denney, Wade, McKinnon	3:05
11.	"I Hope This Comes Back to Haunt You"	Neck Deep, S. Barlow, Wade, McKinnon	2:49
12.	"Rock Bottom"	Neck Deep, S. Barlow, Wade, McKinnon	3:20
Total length:			36:17

HMV/Target exclusive bonus tracks
No.	Title	Length
13.	"December (full band version)"	3:36
14.	"Can't Kick Up the Roots (acoustic)"	2:51
15.	"Lime St. (acoustic)"	3:14
Total length:		46:06

== Personnel ==
Personnel per booklet.

Neck Deep

- Ben Barlow – lead vocals
- Lloyd Roberts – lead guitar
- Fil Thorpe-Evans – bass, backing vocals
- Matt West – rhythm guitar
- Dani Washington – drums

Additional musician

- Jeremy McKinnon – guest vocals on "Kali Ma", "Gold Steps"

Production

- Jeremy McKinnon – producer
- Andrew Wade – producer, recording, mixing
- Alan Douches – mastering

Artwork

- Ricardo Cavolo – artwork

== Charts ==
Chart (2015)	Peak position
Australian Albums (ARIA)	28
Belgian Albums (Ultratop Flanders)	87
Irish Independent Albums Chart	15
Scottish Albums Chart	10
UK Albums (OCC)	8
UK Independent Album Chart	1
UK Rock & Metal Albums Chart	2
UK Vinyl Albums Chart	2
US Billboard 200	17
US Billboard Alternative Albums	3
US Billboard Independent Albums	1
US Billboard Top Rock Albums	3
US Billboard Vinyl Albums	1

== Certifications ==
Region	Certification	Certified units/sales
United Kingdom (BPI)	Silver	60,000^{‡}
^{‡} Sales+streaming figures based on certification alone.
