= Blood Youth =

English hardcore punk band

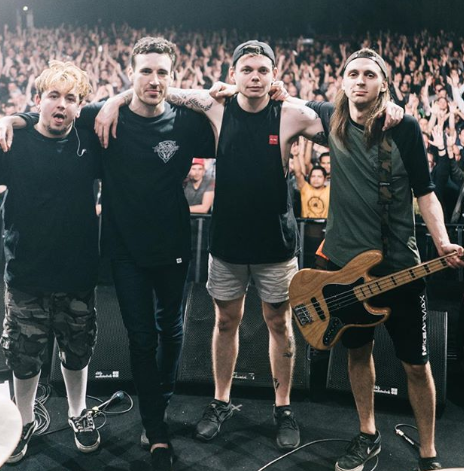
- Blood Youth in 2017; from left to right: Chris Pritchard (guitar), Kaya Tarsus (vocals), Sam Hallett (drums), Matt Hollinson (bass)

Background information
- Origin: Harrogate, North Yorkshire, U.K.
- Genres: Nu metal; metalcore; melodic hardcore; hardcore punk
- Years active: 2014–present (hiatus since 2023)
- Labels: Artery Recordings; Rude Records
- Spinoff of: Climates
- Members: Chris Pritchard; Matt Hollinson; Brad Ratcliffe; Harry Rule
- Past members: Sam Bowden; Matt Powels; Max Dawson; Sam Hallett; Kaya Tarsus
- Website: bloodyouth.com

Blood Youth is an English hardcore punk band formed in Harrogate in 2014. They released three studio albums, two EPs and a short-form documentary produced by Kerrang!.

The band was formed in 2014 by Chris Pritchard (guitar), Sam Bowden (guitar), Matt Powels (drums) and Max Dawson (bass), who were the final line-up of Leicester melodic hardcore band Climates, in addition to former Book of Job vocalist Kaya Tarsus. Their earliest releases made use of a melodic style of heavy metal-influenced hardcore punk, while their post-2018 output has veered closer to the nu metal genre. The both entered a hiatus at the beginning of 2023, by which time their line-up consisted of Pritchard (guitar), Matt Hollinson (bass), Brad Ratcliffe (drums) and Harry Rule (vocals).

== History ==
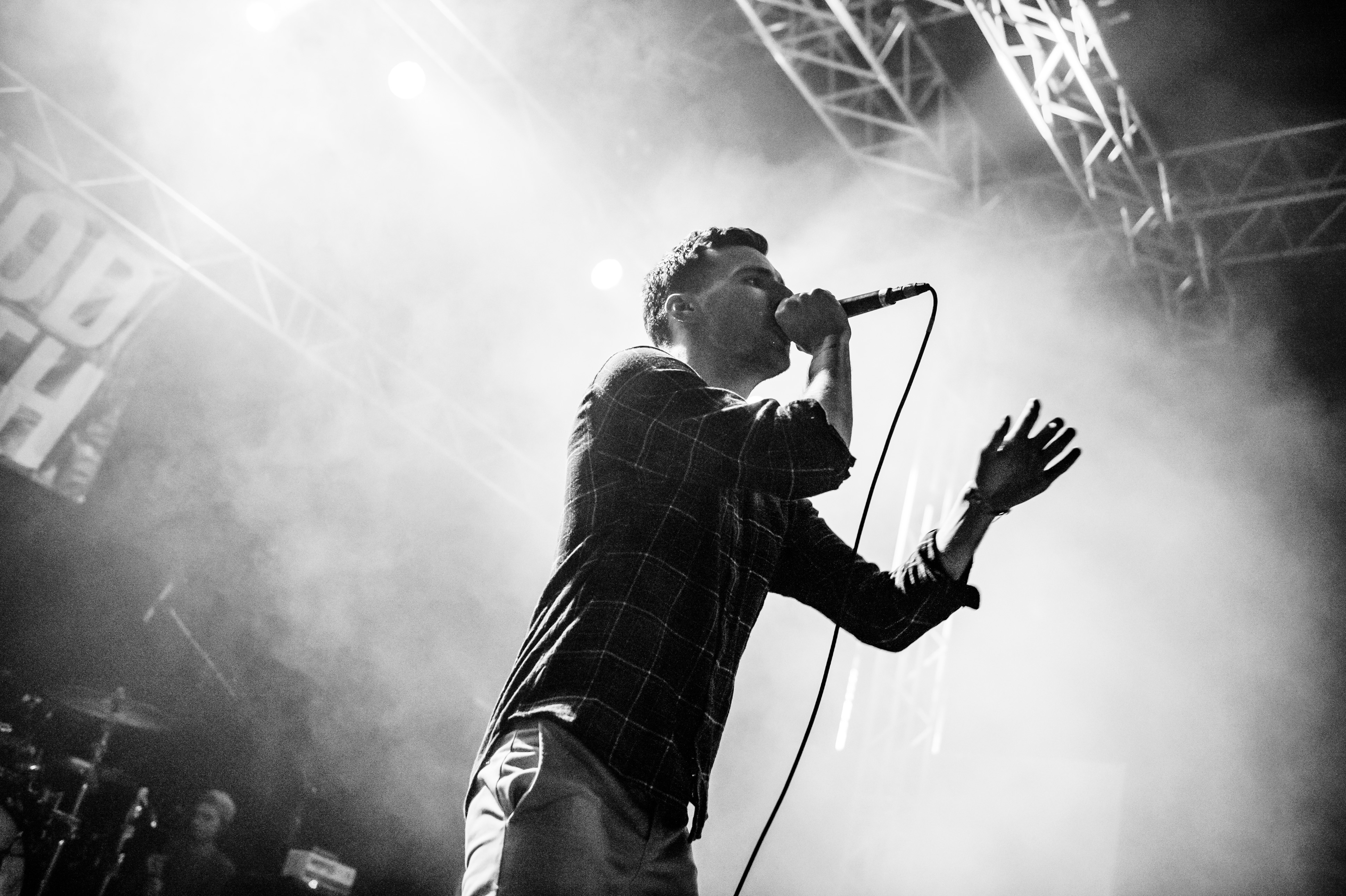
Kaya Tarsus, the band's founding vocalist who left in 2021

Leicester melodic hardcore band Climates broke up after the departure of vocalist Wesley Thompson. On Climates' final tour, they recruited Kaya Tarsus, formerly of Harrogate band Book of Job to fill in on vocals. After the tour, the remaining members formed Blood Youth at the end of 2014. On 11 May 2015, they released their debut single "Failure", which was a part of their debut EP Inside My Head released on 22 June 2015. Later that year, Powels departed from the band. On 17 December, Bowden also departed from the band, joining Welsh pop punk band Neck Deep. On 11 January 2016, they released their second EP Closure. The EP's first single was "Closure", released on 28 January. On 23 May, the EP's second single was released, titled "Mood Swings".

On 6 February 2017, they released the single "Reason to Stay". On 27 February, they released the single "I Remember". On 20 March, they released the single "Making Waves" All three single were included on their debut album Beyond Repair, released on 7 April 2017. In October 2017, they supported Neck Deep on their European headline tour, alongside As It Is and Real Friends. From 8 to 10 April 2017, they played a mini headline tour, with support from Holding Absence and Loathe.

On 19 August 2018, they released the single "Starve". On 4 February 2019, they released the single "Spineless". The singles were included on their second album Starve released on 22 February 2019. From 1 to 8 March 2019, they headlined a tour of the UK supported by Lotus Eater and Palm Reader.

On 5 November 2019, they released the non-album single "Playing The Victim". On 28 June 2021, they released the single "Iron Lung", Around this time it was announced that Hallett was no longer a member of the band and that he had been replaced by new drummer Brad Ratcliffe. On 23 July, they released the single "Cells". On 25 August, they released the single "Body of Wire". On 2 September, they released the single "Colony3". After performing at the 2021 Slam Dunk Festival, Tarsus departed from the group. On 6 September 2021, God Complex vocalist Harry Rule was announced as the band's new lead vocalist. From 15 to 26 September 2021, they toured the UK on a headline tour, supported by Death Blooms. On 30 September, the band announced that their third studio album, Visions Of Another Hell, would be released the following day, 1 October. The album included the five previously released singles and is the final release to include Tarsus.

On 24 January 2023, the band announced that they would be entering a hiatus.

== Musical style and influence ==
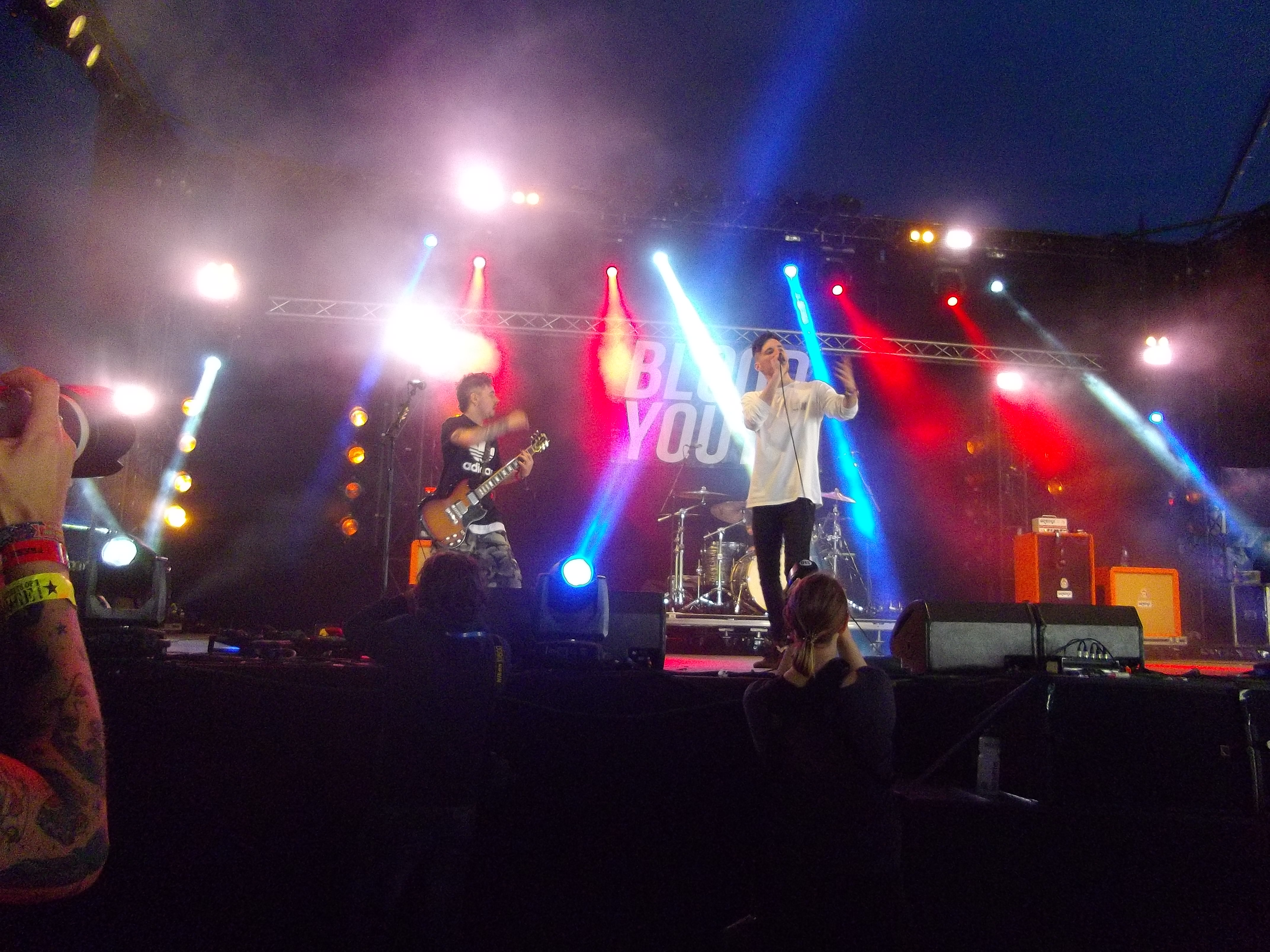
Blood Youth performing at Download Festival 2017

Blood Youth's early music has been described as melodic hardcore, hardcore punk, post-hardcore, and punk metal. On their second album Starve, the band changed their style in favour of a nu metal sound. Their music continued to make use of clean vocals in choruses, however began to juxtapose this with heavy drop tuned guitars. Throughout both of these eras, some critics have categorised their music as metalcore, with later albums specifically being called nu metalcore.

The band's lyrics focus on many different topics based on everyday (namely Tarsus's) life, with songs off of the band's debut EP invoking themes of homelessness, breakups, and financial turmoil. Their sophomore EP Closure focused on such themes as Tarsus's struggle to help his family, emotional claustrophobic towards those new in life and reflecting on the past, while their debut full-length Beyond Repair followed that of numbing oneself via alcohol abuse, the struggle of being an underground musician in a small town, becoming a different person while under the influence of alcohol, one's naivety while young, and simply being angry. Furthermore, on multiple tracks such as "What I'm Running From" and "Big Smoke", Tarsus focuses on his relocation to Barcelona just prior to the formation of the band, the reasons why he departed from England, and what he was feeling during this transition.

Guitarist Chris Pritchard is inspired by nu metal acts such as Korn and Slipknot, namely their first and second albums, stating that he fell in love with songs such as “Wait and Bleed”; vocalist Kaya Tarsus is more-so inspired by hardcore bands such as the Dillinger Escape Plan, Converge, and Every Time I Die. In full contrast, former drummer Sam Hallett's favorite band is The 1975; he is also a huge fan of R&B together with Funeral For a Friend. Other influences they have cited include Touché Amoré, Limp Bizkit, Machine Head, Davey Muise-era Vanna and La Dispute.

== Members ==
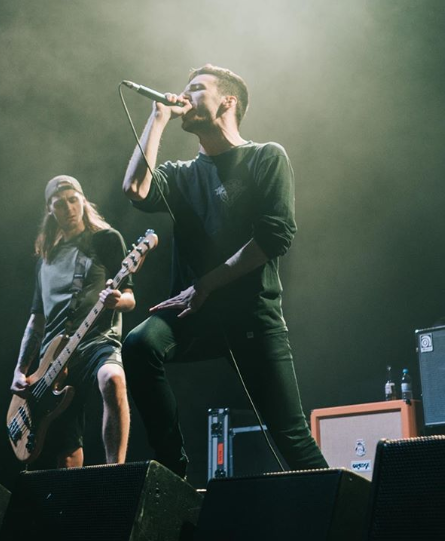
Matt Hollinson (left) and Kaya Tarsus, while opening for Prophets of Rage in 2017

=== Current line-up ===
- Chris Pritchard – guitar (2014–2023)
- Matt Hollinson – bass (2017–2023)
- Brad Ratcliffe – drums (2021–2023)
- Harry Rule – lead vocals (2021–2023)

=== Past members ===
- Sam Bowden – guitar (2014–2015)
- Matt Powels – drums (2014–2015)
- Max Dawson – bass (2014–2017)
- Sam Hallett – drums (2015–2021)
- Kaya Tarsus – lead vocals (2014–2021)

== Discography ==
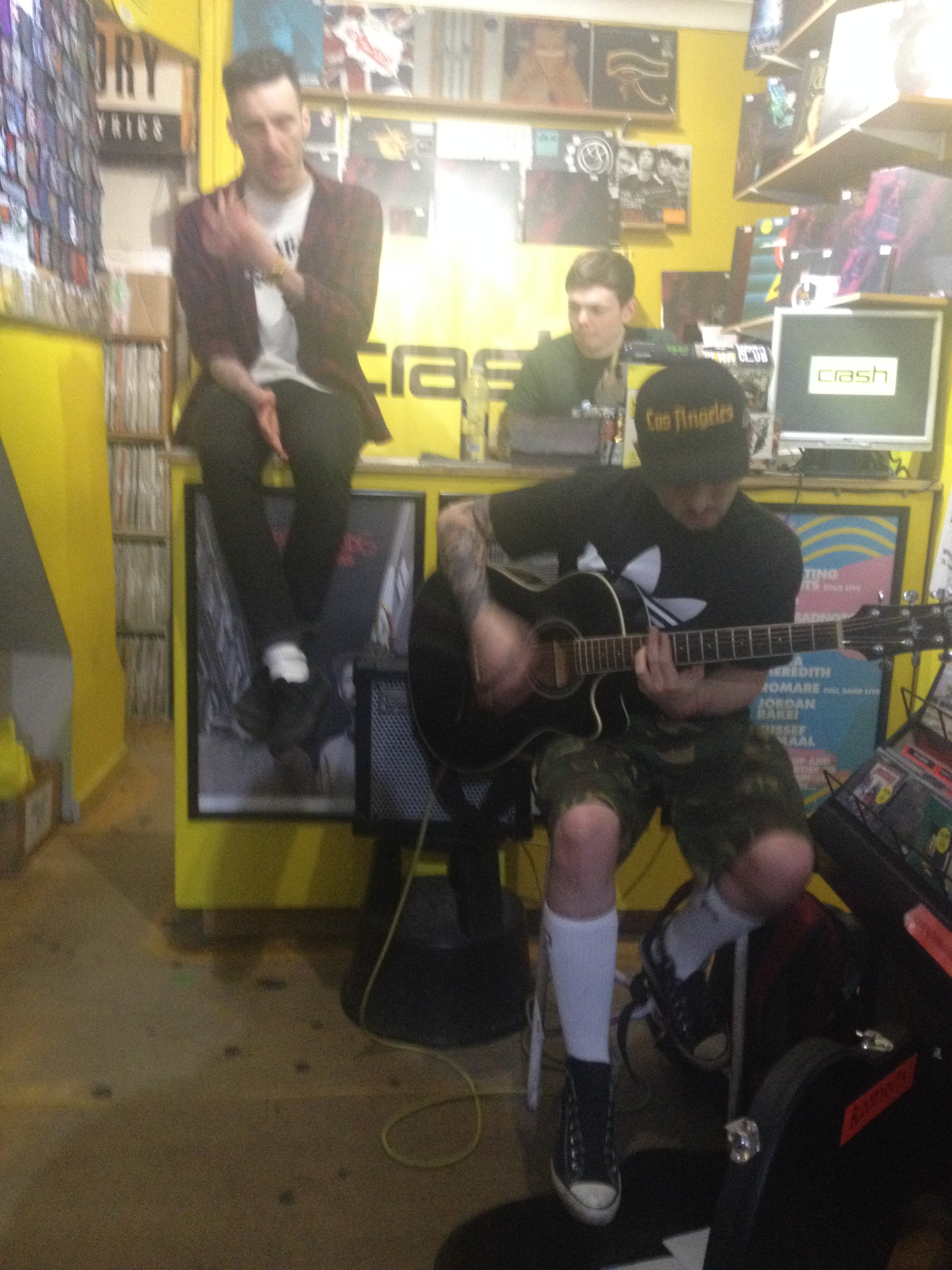
Blood Youth performing an acoustic set at Crash Records, Leeds, in 2017. From top left to bottom right: Kaya Tarsus, Sam Hallett, Chris Pritchard..

=== Studio albums ===
Title	Details
Beyond Repair	Released: 7 April 2017; Label: Rude Records
Starve	Released: 22 February 2019; Label: Rude Records
Visions of Another Hell	Released: 1 October 2021; Label: Rude Records

=== EPs ===
Title	Details
Inside My Head	Released: 22 June 2015; Label: Rude Records, Artery Recordings
Closure	Released: 11 January 2016; Label: Rude Records, Artery Recordings

=== Singles ===
Title	Released
"Failure"	11 May 2015
"Closure"	28 January 2016
"Mood Swing"	23 May 2016
"Reason To Stay"	6 February 2017
"I Remember"	27 February 2017
"Making Waves"	20 March 2017
"Starve"	19 August 2018
"Spineless"	4 February 2019
"Playing The Victim"	5 November 2019
"Iron Lung"	28 June 2021
"Cells"	28 July 2021
"Body of Wire"	16 August 2021
"Colony3"	3 September 2021

== Filmography ==
- From the Ground Up (2018)
