= Rain in July =

EP by Neck Deep
- Released: 18 September 2012
- Recorded: July 2012, Celestial Recordings, Wrexham
- Genre: Pop punk • emo
- Length: 16:42
- Label: We Are Triumphant
- Producer: Sebastian Barlow

Neck Deep chronology
| Rain in July (2012) | A History of Bad Decisions (2013) |

Rain in July is the first EP by Welsh pop punk band Neck Deep.

== Background and production ==
Vocalist Ben Barlow met lead guitarist Lloyd Roberts when Barlow's older brother, Seb, was recording the Wrexham hardcore band Spires that Roberts played in. At the time, Ben Barlow wrote pop punk songs on his own for fun. On 19 April 2012 the duo posted the song "What Did You Expect?" online under the name Neck Deep. According to Roberts, Barlow "literally said, 'What about Neck Deep [as the band name]?' and that was that." The name comes from the Crucial Dudes' song "Boom, Roasted". "What Did You Expect?" soon gained attention online.

This resulted in the duo adding guitarist Matt West, who also played in Spires, and drummer Dani Washington, who was aware of Wrexham's local music scene. Bassist Fil Thorpe-Evans joined shortly after leaving Lincoln post-hardcore band Climates. "I Couldn't Wait to Leave 6 Months Ago " was posted online on 8 June. On 11 June, it was announced the band had signed to US label We Are Triumphant. In July, the band recorded more songs with Seb Barlow in the attic of Ben's home, dubbed Celestial Recordings. The recordings were then mixed by Michael Fossenkemper at Turtletone Studios. The EP contains "six songs about girls and one song about posers", according to Rock Sound's Ollie Pelling. Barlow wrote "A Part of Me" when he was 16 "about a girl who I was crazy about."

== Release and reception ==
Rain in July was made available for streaming via AbsolutePunk on 17 September 2012 and was released a day later through We Are Triumphant. Barlow dubbed the character on the artwork Ned the Head. The band's sound has elements of The Story So Far and City Lights. On 28 October, a music video was released for "I Couldn’t Wait to Leave 6 Months Ago". In November, the EP was released on vinyl via Hang Tight. According to Barlow, "People took notice [of the band] and demanded that we play shows." The band supported With the Punches and Me Vs Hero in the UK in December. The 3 December date of tour was the band's live debut. On 20 January 2013 a music video was released for "Over and Over".

The EP was remixed and remastered as part of the compilation Rain in July / A History of Bad Decisions, released on Hopeless on 17 June 2014. It was released to capitalize on the band's popularity at the time. Barlow said that this compilation would be "definitive release of [these] songs". The band hoped that the new fans that enjoyed Wishful Thinking "will enjoy the chance to check these songs out now that we've had a chance to improve how they sound!"

Rock Sound reviewer Ollie Pelling wrote that despite "looking distinctly average on paper, Neck Deep are more than distinctly average." He mentioned that listeners "won't find many bands writing better pop-punk hooks". He ended with calling the EP "derivative, but there's enough passion, energy and talent here to make it count."

== Track listing ==
All tracks are written by Neck Deep

| No. | Title | Length |
|---|---|---|
| 1. | "Kick It" | 1:34 |
| 2. | "Silver Lining" | 2:43 |
| 3. | "What Did You Expect?" | 3:17 |
| 4. | "Over and Over" | 2:55 |
| 5. | "A Part of Me (feat. Laura Whiteside)" | 3:09 |
| 6. | "I Couldn't Wait to Leave 6 Months Ago" | 2:22 |
| 7. | "All Hype, No Heart" | 0:42 |

== Personnel ==
Personnel adapted from the booklet/sleeve of the Rain in July / A History of Bad Decisions compilation.

Neck Deep

- Ben Barlow – vocals
- Lloyd Roberts – lead guitar
- Fil Thorpe-Evans – bass
- Matt West – rhythm guitar
- Dani Washington – drums

Additional musician

- Laura Whiteside – guest vocals

Production

- Sebastian Barlow – producer, engineer
- Michael Fossenkemper – mastering
- Peter O'Toole – 'Ned' illustration
