= Wishful Thinking (Neck Deep album) =

Studio album by Neck Deep
- Released: 14 January 2014
- Recorded: March – August 2013
- Studios: Celestial Recordings, Wrexham; Outhouse Studio, Reading
- Genre: Pop punk
- Length: 34:27
- Label: Hopeless
- Producers: Seb Barlow, Neck Deep

Neck Deep chronology
A History of Bad Decisions (2013)	Wishful Thinking (2014)	Life's Not out to Get You (2015)

Singles from Wishful Thinking
- 1. "Crushing Grief (No Remedy)" Released: 29 October 2013; 2. "Growing Pains" Released: 17 December 2013; 3. "Losing Teeth" Released: 2 July 2014

Wishful Thinking is the debut studio album by the Welsh pop punk band Neck Deep. Vocalist Ben Barlow met guitarist Lloyd Roberts when Roberts was working with Barlow's brother, Seb. Following the upload of a song under the artist name Neck Deep, the song gained attention. This attention resulted in the duo obtaining guitarist Matt West, drummer Dani Washington and bassist Fil Thorpe-Evans. The band released two EPs, Rain in July (2012) and A History of Bad Decisions. In March 2013 the band started recording material at Celestial Recordings in Wrexham, where they began recording guitar, bass and vocals. The group then moved to Outhouse Studio in Reading, where they recorded drums. Material was produced by Seb Barlow and the band. In mid-August, the group had signed to Hopeless, and by late August, they announced the album had been finished.

"Crushing Grief (No Remedy)" was released as a single in October 2013. Following this the band toured the UK and Australia. "Growing Pains" was released as a single in December. In early January 2014 Wishful Thinking was made available for streaming, and the group went on a headlining tour of the UK. The album, released a week after the stream, was so successful that the band moved from a "fun, part-time [entity]", as Barlow called it, to a full-time endeavor. As such, Thorpe-Evans, West and Roberts quit their jobs, Washington turned down a place at the Academy of Contemporary Music, and Barlow dropped out of university. "Losing Teeth" was released as a single in July.

== Background ==
Vocalist Ben Barlow met guitarist Lloyd Roberts when Barlow's older brother, Seb, was recording the Wrexham hardcore band Spires that Roberts played in. At the time Barlow wrote pop punk songs for fun. The duo posted the song "What Did You Expect?" online under the name Neck Deep. According to Roberts Barlow "literally said, 'What about Neck Deep [as the band name]?' and that was that." "What Did You Expect?" soon gained attention online. This resulted in the duo adding guitarist Matt West, who also played in Spires, and drummer Dani Washington, who was aware of Wrexham's local music scene. Bassist Fil Thorpe-Evans joined shortly after leaving Lincoln post-hardcore band Climates. The band recorded more songs with Seb Barlow in the attic of Ben's home. The band released an EP, Rain in July, in September 2012, which gained the band even more attention from people. According to Barlow, "People took notice and demanded that we play shows."

The band supported With the Punches and Me Vs Hero in the UK in December. The 3 December date of tour was the band's live debut. At their second show the band signed with a manager. The band toured the UK supporting Hacktivist in February 2013. Also in February the band released the A History of Bad Decisions EP as a "pay what you want" download. The band and their tour manager went on a holiday to Florida. The group ended up playing two shows that were "crazy and sold out and packed", according to Thorpe-Evans. Videos of the shows ended up online, which were seen by independent label Hopeless Records. Hopeless got in contact with the band's manager who put the label in contact with the band. The band signed to Hopeless in August 2013. Being signed to the label was "a dream come true" for the band.

== Composition and recording ==
All of the songs that would feature on Wishful Thinking were written during the summer with almost all of them credited to Neck Deep. "Crushing Grief (No Remedy)" was credited to the band and Seb Barlow. Ben Barlow considered "inspiration" the hardest part of making the album due to him being "super happy". Whereas for the band's EP releases Barlow "had some shit going on that I needed to get off my chest". The band "worked incredibly hard" to make an album that reaches high standards set by other artists' albums that Hopeless have released. Rock Sound contributor Rob Sayce noted that the album was influenced by All Time Low's Nothing Personal (2009). Sayce wrote that the band "gave British pop-punk a shot in the arm, drawing on the production sheen of 'Nothing Personal.'" "Losing Teeth" is about how Barlow and his friends were pursuing careers that would take them away from their hometown. Barlow said it wasn't "about the end of our youth, as such, but definitely the end of us being kids, and reflecting on that." "Growing Pains" was the band's first attempt at "diversity we have tried to implement", according to Thorpe-Evans. Thorpe-Evans mentioned that the group felt the song "has a flair of originality and uniqueness" when compared to the previous output. "Candour" was inspired by Barlow's dad, who was "ill for a while."

Following a tour with Attention Thieves that ended in March 2013 the band went to record in Barlow's attic, which was dubbed Celestial Recordings. Material recorded here was produced and engineered by the band and Seb Barlow. At Celestial Recordings, the band recorded guitar, bass and vocals. The drums were recorded at Outhouse Studio, located in Reading. Here, Ben Humphreys helped with recording and engineering. "What Did You Expect?" was re-recorded for inclusion on the album as the group, according to Barlow, wanted to "see how far we've come as a band." (Note: "Threat Level Midnight" was recorded for the album, however, the band were unsure of where to place the song in the track listing. The song was nearly included as a bonus track for Wishful Thinking, instead it was re-recorded for Life's Not out to Get You (2015).) The band, George Prole, Laura Whiteside, Seb Barlow provided backing vocals. Sean Harrison created an orchestral arrangement for "Candour", which features guest vocals by Whiteside. The album was mixed by Jordan Valeriote at Sundown Studio in Guelph, Canada while mastering was performed by Troy Glessner at Spectre Mastering in Seattle, Washington. On 25 August, it was announced that the album was "finished. Mixed, mastered and delivered" to Hopeless. The band "couldn't be happier with the results" and were looking forward to their fans hearing it.

== Release ==
"Crushing Grief (No Remedy)" was released as a single on 29 October 2013. A day later the album was announced. Neck Deep toured with fellow label mates The Wonder Years in the UK in mid November. In late November the band toured Australia. "Growing Pains" was released as a single on 17 December. A music video was released for the song on the same day, which was directed by LOVE Vis-Art. The video parodies 1990s popular culture, based around "simple, universal themes that anyone can relate to: adolescence, love and friendship", according to Thorpe-Evans. On 1 January 2014 the band teased clips of the Losing Teeth" and "Crushing Grief (No Remedy)" and a day later, the band teased a clip of "Staircase Wit". On 7 January, the album was made available for streaming. A day later, the band went on a headlining tour in the UK. During the tour the band had two shows to celebrate the release of the album, one in Wrexham and the other in London. On 14 January, Wishful Thinking was released through Hopeless Records. (Note: US Hopeless HR 787) The band later revealed that if they didn't sign with Hopeless, they were initially going to self-release the album. Up until this point, the band was a "fun, part-time [entity]", according to Barlow. With the release of the album, the band became a full-time thing, according to Barlow: "Fuck it, let's do this properly".

The success of the album resulted in Thorpe-Evans, West and Roberts quitting their jobs, drummer Dani Washington turning down a place at the Academy of Contemporary Music and Barlow dropping out of university. In late January and early February 2014 the band supported We Are the in Crowd in the UK. Between late February and early April the band toured the US alongside Light Years and Knuckle Puck. In mid-to-late April, the band toured the UK with Climates as the support act. "Losing Teeth" was released as a single on 2 July, A music video was released for the song on the same day. The video was filmed back in May. The original vision for the video would have consisted of two girls dressed as teeth. Barlow said that concept "didn’t really translate", resulting in the performance-based video. The band played on the 2014 edition of Warped Tour. In September, the band went on a co-headlining tour with State Champs in Australia. In October and November, the band supported Real Friends on their tour of the US. The band went on The Intercontinental Championships Tour in the UK, with Knuckle Puck, Seaway and Trophy Eyes as support acts, in January and February 2015. According to Barlow all of the support acts were friends with the band. Barlow was "really stoked" being able to bring those bands to the UK as the fans have been expecting them. The tour was the band's biggest headlining tour so far.

== Reception ==
Professional ratings
Aggregate scores
Source	Rating
Metacritic	71/100
Review scores
Source	Rating
AbsolutePunk	8.5/10 stars
AllMusic	2.5/5 stars
Alternative Press	3.5/5 stars
Kerrang!	4/5 Ks

Wishful Thinking charted at number 108 in the UK album chart. It charted at number 2 on both the Rock & Metal Albums and the Record Store charts. It also charted at number 6 on the Independent Album Breakers chart, and at number 14 on the Independent Albums chart. In the US, the album charted on the Billboard Heatseekers Albums chart at number 3, and at number 35 on the Independent Albums chart. The album was included on Noisecreep's "Most Anticipated Release of January 2014" list. The album was included at number 27 on Rock Sound's "The 51 Most Essential Pop Punk Albums of All Time" list. The album was included at number 15 on Rock Sound's "Top 50 Albums of the Year" list. The album was noted for "its importance" that "cannot be overstated" due to the UK's low number of pop punk bands. It "propell[ed the band] into the genre's upper echelons virtually overnight." The album was included at number 30 on Kerrang!'s "The Top 50 Rock Albums Of 2014" list.

Jack Rogers of Rock Sound wrote that the album was full of "Fast-paced, infectiously catchy" songs that were "brimming with youthful energy". He considered the collection of songs "exactly the [kind of] album the band needed to deliver", following on from their EPs. Rogers thought the final two songs, "Blank Pages" and "Candour", "fizzle out rather than explode", although they show "a young band delivering on their initial promise." Concluding that there is "still plenty of room for improvement and growth", the group have "certainly come out swinging."

== Track listing ==
All songs written by Neck Deep, except for "Crushing Grief (No Remedy)" written by Neck Deep and Seb Barlow.

No.	Title	Length
1.	"Losing Teeth"	2:59
2.	"Crushing Grief (No Remedy)"	2:56
3.	"Staircase Wit"	3:10
4.	"Damsel in Distress"	3:22
5.	"Zoltar Speaks"	2:56
6.	"Growing Pains"	2:56
7.	"Say What You Want"	1:01
8.	"Mileage"	2:39
9.	"Sweet Nothings"	2:42
10.	"What Did You Expect?"	3:16
11.	"Blank Pages"	3:13
12.	"Candour"	3:17

== Personnel ==
Personnel per booklet.

Neck Deep

- Ben Barlow – vocals
- Lloyd Roberts – lead guitar
- Matt West – rhythm guitar
- Fil Thorpe-Evans – bass
- Dani Washington – drums

Additional musicians

- Neck Deep, George Prole, Laura Whiteside, Seb Barlow – backing vocals
- Sean Harrison – orchestral arrangement on "Candour"
- Laura Whiteside – guest vocals on "Candour"

Production

- Seb Barlow – producer, engineering
- Neck Deep – producer, engineering
- Ben Humphreys – recording, engineering
- Jordan Valeriote – mixing
- Troy Glessner – mastering

Artwork

- Paul Jackson – cover artwork
- Jon Barmby – layout
- Alex Gregory – band photo

== Charts ==
Chart (2014)	Peak position
UK Albums Chart	108
UK Independent Album Chart	14
UK Independent Album Breakers Chart	6
UK Record Store Chart	2
UK Rock & Metal Albums Chart	2
US Billboard Heatseekers Albums	3
US Billboard Independent Albums	35
