= A History of Bad Decisions =

EP by Neck Deep
- Released: 19 February 2013
- Recorded: January 2013, Celestial Recordings, Wrexham
- Genre: Pop punk
- Length: 9:17
- Label: Self-released
- Producer: Sebastian Barlow

Neck Deep chronology
Rain in July (2012)	A History of Bad Decisions (2013)	Wishful Thinking (2014)

A History of Bad Decisions is the second EP by Welsh pop punk band Neck Deep, released 19 February 2013, following up their first EP Rain in July.

== Background and production ==
Vocalist Ben Barlow met guitarist Lloyd Roberts when Barlow's older brother, Seb, was recording the Wrexham hardcore band Spires that Roberts played in. At the time Barlow wrote pop punk songs for fun. The duo posted the song "What Did You Expect?" online under the name Neck Deep. The song soon gained attention online. This resulted in the duo adding guitarist Matt West, who also played in Spires, and drummer Dani Washington, who was aware of Wrexham's local music scene. Bassist Fil Thorpe-Evans joined shortly after leaving Lincoln post-hardcore band Climates.

The band recorded more songs with Seb Barlow in the attic of Ben's home, dubbed Celestial Recordings. The band released an EP, Rain in July, in September 2012, which gained the band even more attention from people. According to Barlow, "People took notice and demanded that we play shows." The band supported With the Punches and Me Vs Hero in the UK in December. In January 2013, the band recording the A History of Bad Decisions EP at Celestial Recordings. The recordings were then mixed by Michael Fossenkemper at Turtletone Studios. "Up in Smoke" details when Barlow was kicked out of university and for being a stoner, which is where the title comes from. Barlow said he was kicked out as he was not attending lectures, which he missed due to tours with the band.

== Release and reception ==
On 21 February 2013, the band released the EP as a "pay what you want" download. The band toured the UK supporting Hacktivist in February 2013.

The EP was remixed and remastered as part of the compilation Rain in July / A History of Bad Decisions, released on Hopeless on 17 June 2014. It was released to capitalize on the band's popularity at the time. Vocalist Ben Barlow said that this compilation would be "definitive release of [these] songs". The band hoped that the new fans that enjoyed Wishful Thinking "will enjoy the chance to check these songs out now that we've had a chance to improve how they sound!"

Andy Ritchie of Rock Sound wrote that the EP's length doesn't provide "much in terms of listening capacity", but shows the band's progression since their Rain in July EP. He named "Tables Turned" and "Head to the Ground" as "sonic proof" of the band's capability to compose "catchy songs with heart and soul."

== Track listing ==
All tracks are written by Neck Deep

No.	Title	Length
1.	"Up in Smoke"	3:11
2.	"Tables Turned"	3:28
3.	"Head to the Ground"	2:40

== Personnel ==
Personnel adapted from the booklet/sleeve of the Rain in July / A History of Bad Decisions compilation.

Neck Deep

- Ben Barlow – vocals
- Lloyd Roberts – lead guitar
- Fil Thorpe-Evans – bass
- Matt West – rhythm guitar
- Dani Washington – drums

Production

- Sebastian Barlow – producer, engineer
- Michael Fossenkemper – mastering
- Peter O'Toole – 'Tiger' illustration
