= Wargasm (disambiguation) =

Wargasm is a British rock band comprising Sam Matlock and Milkie Way.

Wargasm may also refer to:

== Arts, entertainment, media ==
- Wargasm (video game) (stylized "WARGASM": War Ground Air Special Missions; formerly EBT Tank), a 1998 videogame
- "Wargasm", a 2017 season 3 number 10 episode 30 of TV show Killjoys
- Hellwitch Vs. Lady Death: Wargasm, a 2022 comic book published by Coffin Comics, a Lady Death title

=== Albums and records ===
- Wargasm – The Slash Years, a best-of album-set, based upon the L7 compilation album The Slash Years
- Wargasm, a 1992 EP by Templebeat

=== Songs and singles ===
- "Wargasm", a song by L7 from the 1992 album Bricks Are Heavy
- "Wargasm", a 2008 song by Illuminatus off the album The Wrath of the Lambs
- "Wargasm", a 2018 song by Ministry off the album AmeriKKKant
- "Wargasm", a 2021 non-album single by Billy Strings

== Other uses ==
- Total war, all out warfare, wargasm
- Wargasm, a type of celebration in the Weather Underground
- The Flint War Council, a seminal Weather Underground event billed as "the Wargasm"
