= Inertia (Pendulum album) =

Studio album by Pendulum
- Released: August 22, 2025
- Length: 54:27
- Label: Mushroom Music

Pendulum chronology
| Anima (2023) | Inertia (2025) |

Singles from Inertia
- 1. "Driver / Nothing For Free" Released: 27 September 2020; 2. "Come Alive" Released: 15 April 2021; 3. "Louder Than Words" Released: 17 June 2021; 4. "Halo" Released: 2 June 2023; 5. "Colourfast" Released: 8 September 2023; 6. "Mercy Killing" Released: 1 November 2023; 7. "Napalm" Released: 21 August 2024; 8. "Save the Cat" Released: 27 May 2025; 9. "Cannibal" Released: 25 July 2025; 10. "Guiding Lights" Released: 19 August 2025

Inertia is the fourth studio album by Australian electronic music band Pendulum. It was announced in May 2025, and released on 22 August 2025, making it the band's first full-length album in over 15 years. The album includes all tracks from their previous 2 EPs; Elemental (2021), and Anima (2023), as well as new songs. Excluding works from the previous EPs, the album was preceded by the singles "Napalm" (with Joey Valence & Brae), "Save the Cat", "Cannibal" (with Wargasm), and "Guiding Lights" (with Awolnation).

When discussing the album, Rob Swire said that he was "basically testing how far we could push Pendulum. Seeing what we could get away with." The album has been described as a "raw statement of evolution" from the band, and includes collaborations with various artists both within and outside of electronic music.

To support the album, Pendulum announced a UK tour in November 2025, which was later expanded to include dates across Europe and Australia.

== Overview ==
=== Background and recording ===
Inertia consists of all of the tracks from Pendulum's two previous EPs, Elemental (2021) and Anima (2023), alongside a number of new tracks. The first track specifically written for the album to be unveiled was the (at the time) non-album single "Napalm", which debuted in early 2024 as the intro for the band's UK tour. The track continued to be played across Europe at festivals and was formally released in August that year to coincide with the band's appearance at Reading & Leeds festivals. Speaking on the track, Rob Swire noted that the band was "only doing singles", and that he hoped to have a more substantial release in the following year. The track's sound was part of a trend by the band to lean into heavier sounds despite the more recent resurgence of the drum & bass genre from which the band had originally come from. Swire also noted that the album was the sound of Pendulum finding its sound again, comparing it (and the band) to The Prodigy, who had managed to break away from traditional genre conventions and find a sound that was uniquely their own.

Discussing the album's first single, "Save the Cat", Swire noted that the track was written during a breakup and "a period of self-questioning and frustration".

The album's first track, "Driver", opens with the sound of crashing waves upon a shoreline and the sound of a person gasping for air—acting as a bridge from "Encoder", the final track on the band's previous album Immersion which ended with the sound of sinking beneath the waves.

== Track listing ==
All tracks written and produced by Rob Swire.

| No. | Title | Writer(s) | Producer(s) | Length |
|---|---|---|---|---|
| 1. | "Driver" | | Gareth McGrillen | 3:28 |
| 2. | "Come Alive" | | | 3:53 |
| 3. | "Save the Cat" | Dan Lancaster; Gareth McGrillen | Owen Charles | 2:52 |
| 4. | "Archangel" | | | 4:03 |
| 5. | "Nothing For Free" | | | 3:04 |
| 6. | "Cannibal" (with Wargasm) | Milkie Way; Sam Matlock | Sam Matlock | 3:21 |
| 7. | "Constellations" | | | 0:45 |
| 8. | "Halo" (with Bullet for My Valentine) | Matt Tuck | | 2:49 |
| 9. | "Louder Than Words" (with Hybrid Minds) | Gareth McGrillen; Peredur ap Gwynedd; Matthew Lowe; Josh White | Gareth McGrillen; Matthew Lowe; Josh White | 3:56 |
| 10. | "Napalm" (with Joey Valence & Brae) | Gareth McGrillen; Joseph Bertolino; Braedan Lugue | Gareth McGrillen | 3:24 |
| 11. | "The Endless Gaze" | | | 1:01 |
| 12. | "Guiding Lights" (with AWOLNATION) | Aaron Bruno | | 4:24 |
| 13. | "Colourfast" | | | 3:47 |
| 14. | "Silent Spinner" | | | 4:24 |
| 15. | "Mercy Killing" (with Scarlxrd) | Marius Listhrop | | 3:49 |
| 16. | "Cartagena" | | Gareth McGrillen | 5:27 |
| Total length: | | | | 54:27 |

== Personnel ==
=== Pendulum ===
- Rob Swire - writing, production (all), vocals (all except track 10), guitars (track 3, 4, 6, 12, 15, 16), mixing (all except track 3)
- Gareth McGrillen - writing (track 3, 9, 10), production (track 1, 9, 10, 16), guitars (track 3, 16)
- Peredur ap Gwynedd - writing (track 9), guitars (track 1, 2, 5, 8, 9, 12, 13, 14)
- KJ Sawka - acoustic drums (track 2, 8, 9, 12, 13)

=== Guest musicians ===
- Sam Matlock - writing, production (Cannibal)
- Milkie Way - writing, vocals (Cannibal)
- Matt Tuck - writing, vocals (Halo)
- Matt Lowe - writing, production (Louder Than Words)
- Josh White - writing, production (Louder Than Words)
- Aaron Bruno - writing, vocals (Guiding Lights)
- Marius Listhrop - writing, vocals (Mercy Killing)

=== Additional musicians ===
- Ted Jensen - mastering (all)
- Rob McFarlane - mixing (Come Alive)
- Owen Charles - production (Save The Cat)
- Dan Lancaster - writing (Save The Cat)
- Zakk Cervini - mixing (Save The Cat)
- Tauren Wells - speech writing (The Endless Gaze)
- Jill Anderson - speech writing (The Endless Gaze)
- Scorccio - sample replacement (The Endless Gaze)

Credits adapted from album liner notes.

== Charts ==
| Chart (2025) | Peak position |
|---|---|
| Australian Albums (ARIA) | 59 |
| Austrian Albums (Ö3 Austria) | 63 |
| Belgian Albums (Ultratop Flanders) | 61 |
| Finnish Albums (Suomen virallinen lista) | 36 |
| Dutch Albums (Album Top 100) | 60 |
| Swiss Albums (Schweizer Hitparade) | 100 |
| UK Albums (Official Charts) | 8 |
