= Glasnost (disambiguation) =

Glasnost refers to a 1980s Soviet policy that called for increased openness and transparency in government institutions and activities.

Glasnost may also refer to:

- Glasnost (album), a 2011 album by alternative metal band Illuminatus
- The Glasnost Bowl, an attempt in 1989 to schedule a U.S. college football game to be played in Moscow
- A song on the 2004 album Lifeblood by Welsh rock band Manic Street Preachers
