= 70% Dead =

Single by Wargasm featuring Corey Taylor
- Released: 12 July 2024
- Genre: Nu-metal
- Length: 3:42
- Label: Slowplay, Republic
- Songwriters: Ben Havok; Charlie Russell; Kieron Pepper; Michael Taylor; Rachel Hastings; Sam Matlock
- Producers: Charlie Russell; Wargasm; Kieron Pepper

Wargasm featuring Corey Taylor singles chronology
"Girls Gone Wild" (2024)	"70% Dead" (2024)

Music video
- "70% Dead" (official audio) on YouTube

"70% Dead" is a nu-metal single by Wargasm featuring Slipknot vocalist Corey Taylor. Released on 12 July 2024 on Slowplay & Republic Records, the song is about the current state of the world as vocalist Milkie Way describes, "a cry out at a world gone mad" due to war, disease and inequality.

== Background ==
The song was first teased in a video released on the band's social media, with an audio message from Way to Matlock saying "Why don’t you call that guy you really like, the shouty guy?"

The idea for the track came from when the band supported featuring artist Corey Taylor on his USA tour in 2023, speaking with NME they described how Matlock "jumped on the mic" with Taylor during his set and their voices "sounded right together".

== Personnel ==
- Rachel Hastings - vocals, production
- Sam Matlock - vocals, production
- Charlie Russell - production, mixing
- Kieron Pepper - production
- Grant Berry - mastering

== Release history ==
Release history for "70% Dead"
Region	Date	Version	Label	Ref.
Various	12 July 2024	Digital download; streaming	Slowplay, Republic	
