= Hot Singles in Your Area =

Studio album by Scene Queen
- Released: June 28, 2024
- Genre: Metalcore, hyperpop
- Length: 35:59
- Label: Hopeless
- Producer: Zach Jones

Singles from Hot Singles in Your Area
- 1. "18+" Released: March 16, 2023; 2. "Pink Push-Up Bra" Released: September 20, 2023; 3. "MILF" Released: November 1, 2023; 4. "Finger" Released: March 6, 2024; 5. "Stuck" Released: April 11, 2024; 6. "Whips and Chains" Released: May 29, 2024; 7. "Girls Gone Wild" Released: June 27, 2024

Hot Singles in Your Area is the debut studio album by American singer Scene Queen, released via Hopeless Records on June 28, 2024. The album features artists Wargasm, 6arelyhuman, and the Ready Set.

== Composition ==
Scene Queen stated her inspiration for the album saying "I wrote [this] album about growing up in the early 2000s but not exploring my sexuality until my 20s with all the messy and chaotic situations you find yourself in when you're trying to find yourself and your own power." She wrote "Whips and Chains" about the fear of being a woman at a bar. The album's opening song, "BDSM", is about the discrimination of women in the metal and alternative music scene, with the letters standing for "Beat Down Slut Metal" and "Big Dumb Stupid Men". "Oral Fixation" is about the problems of dating for the first time. "MILF" is a country music-style track about people who grew up with this genre, but moved away from it due to its conservative beliefs, and was inspired by a visit Scene Queen made to Tennessee one summer.

== Reception ==
Professional ratings
Review scores
Source	Rating
All About the Rock	9/10 stars
Distorted Sound	9/10 stars
Dork	4/5 stars
Kerrang!	4/5 stars
Metal Hammer	4/5 stars
New Noise Magazine	4/5 stars
RAMzine	4.5/5 stars

Hot Singles in Your Area's lead single "18+" sparked online controversy with the lyrics directly calling out alleged child predators within the rock music community. In regards to the leud tracklist, LouderSound stated "...Scene Queen's ability to leverage pornography metaphorically is endless." SoundBoard noted that the album feels redundant based on her past work. Kerrang! praised the album for being "rather cleverly structured", while at times feisty and hilarious. Metal Talk claimed that the album takes no prisoners.

== Track listing ==
All tracks are written by Hannah Collins and Zach Jones with additional writers noted. All tracks produced by Jones with additional producers noted.

No.	Title	Writer(s)	Producer(s)	Length
1.	"BDSM"	Chris Freeman; KJ Strock		2:16
2.	"18+"	Rachel Kanner; Jason Aalon Butler	Butler	3:13
3.	"Whips and Chains"	Freeman; Curtis Peoples		2:10
4.	"Pink Push-Up Bra"	Kanner; Strock		2:12
5.	"Mutual Masturbation"	Freeman; Peoples		2:36
6.	"Girls Gone Wild" (featuring Wargasm)	Kanner; Rachel Hastings; Sam Matlock		2:22
7.	"POV" (featuring the Ready Set)	Jordan Witzigreuter		1:56
8.	"Hot Singles in Your Area"	Kanner; Peoples		2:26
9.	"MILF"	Kanner; Strock		1:58
10.	"Amateur"	Kanner; Peoples		2:27
11.	"Stuck" (featuring 6arelyhuman)	Rob Nelsen; Toby Hamilton	Inverness	2:04
12.	"Finger"	Peoples; Maize Olinger		2:33
13.	"PEG"	Jordan Brasko Gable		2:10
14.	"Oral Fixation"	Matlock		2:34
15.	"Climax"	Strock; Lauren Mandel		2:55
Total length:				35:59

== Personnel ==
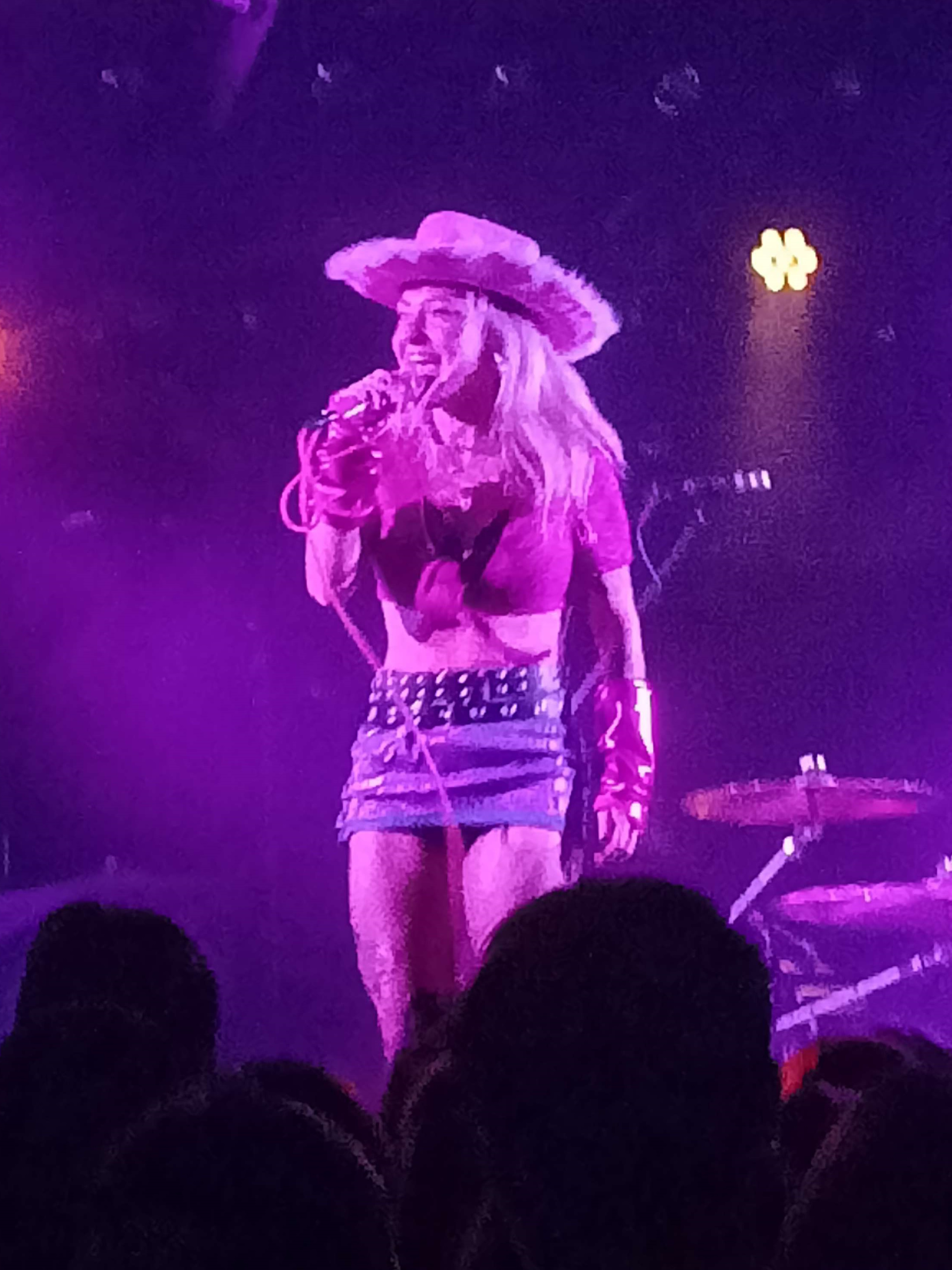
Scene Queen in 2024

- Scene Queen – primary artist, composer
- Wargasm – featured artist
- The Ready Set – featured artist
- 6arelyhuman – featured artist
- Zach Jones – composer, producer
- Inverness – producer
- Chris Freeman – composer
- KJ Strock – composer
- Rachel Kanner – composer
- Jason Aalon – composer
- Curtis Peoples – composer
- Rachel Hastings – composer
- Sam Matlock – composer
- Jordan Witzigreuter – composer
- Rob Nelsen – composer
- Toby Hamilton – composer
- Maize Olinger – composer
- Brasko Gable – composer
- Lauren Mandel – composer

== Charts ==
Chart performance for Hot Singles in Your Area
Chart (2022)	Peak position
UK Rock & Metal Albums (OCC)	7
UK Independent Albums (OCC)	11
Scottish Albums (OCC)	71
