= Dead! =

British rock band

- Origin: Southampton, England
- Genres: Hard rock
- Years active: 2012–2018
- Past members: Sam Matlock; Louis Matlock; Alex Mountford; Sam Chappell

Dead!, sometimes stylised as DEAD!, were an English hard rock band. Comprising Alex Mountford, Sam Chappell, and brothers Louis Matlock and Sam Matlock, the band formed in Southampton in 2012 but moved to London by June 2016. They released the 2018 album The Golden Age of Not Even Trying, which charted at No. 11 on the UK Rock & Metal Albums Chart and received generally positive reception, before splitting up shortly afterwards.

== History ==
Dead! comprised Alex Mountford, Sam Chappell, Sam Matlock, and Louis Matlock. The Matlocks are the sons of Glen Matlock, the bassist for the Sex Pistols. Sam told CM Kavanagh of The Edge that the band's name came from a folder of songs labelled "Dead", which he had compiled in case he was hit by a bus. The exclamation mark was added because the band were fans of the punk band Dangerous!. Its members are from the Isle of Wight but formed a band in 2012 while at Southampton Solent University, playing their first live performance that year. In 2014, the band released the EP Tu Me Manques, which they crowdfunded.

The band were signed to Infectious Music in May 2016; by the following month, they had moved to London and released a music video for "You're so Cheap", a track about teenage angst. By September, they were performing in unusual places and producing their own zines and clothes as part of a movement they called "The Damned Restless Future" after a lyric from an early demo of theirs. That month, they released "Something More Original", a track about the apathy of their childhood, alongside a video. Also in 2016, Dead! served as a supporting act for Frank Carter and the Rattlesnakes on tour.

In March 2017, they released "Enough, Enough, Enough", a track about Mountford's personality defects, followed by a video the month after; by August, they had released a further single, "Up for Ran$om". A further single release, October's "The Golden Age of Not Even Trying", was accompanied by a video and an announcement of an album of the same name; both titles reflected the band's view that society was living in such an age. The band released that album on 26 January 2018; consisting entirely of songs recorded live, the album charted at No. 11 on the UK Rock & Metal Albums Chart and was described as a combination of rock music, punk music, and indie by Melissa Moody of River Online. The album was reviewed positively by her and reviewers from The Music, All Things Loud, Narc, The Student Playlist, and Clash, although a very negative review came from The Soundboard.

The band announced in June that they would split up after playing one final live performance in October. Sam subsequently formed Wargasm with Milkie Way, who had been the band's photographer. Rob Wacey of AllMusic described the band as a "hard rock outfit that flirt with elements of pop-punk and grunge", writing in October 2020, Jo Lisney of The Edge concurred with this and wrote that their lyrics typically involved partying.

== Discography ==
=== Albums ===
- The Golden Age of Not Even Trying (2018)

=== EPs ===
- Dead! (2012)
- Tu Me Manques (2014)

=== Singles ===
- "Beautiful Broken Bones" (2013)
- "Phantom" (2014)
- "Enemy" (2015)
- "Skin" (2015)
- "Something More Original" (2016)
- "Enough, Enough, Enough" (2017)
- "Up for Ran$om" (2017)
- "The Golden Age of Not Even Trying" (2017)
- "Any Port" (2017)
- "The Boys † The Boys" (2018)
- "You're so Cheap" (2018)

== Nominations ==
Heavy Music Awards

Year	Nominee / work	Award	Result	Ref.
2017	Dead!	Best Breakthrough Band	Nominated	
