= Illuminatus (band) =

British metal band

- Origin: Nottingham, England
- Genres: Alternative Metal, Heavy metal, Post-Rock, Progressive Metal
- Years active: 2002–2012
- Label: Headroom Records
- Members: Leo Giovazzini (Bass & Backing Vocals); Jonathan Martin (Guitars & Backing Vocals); Felix Rullhusen (Drums); Julio Taylor (Guitars & Main Vocals)
- Past members: Mark Freestone, Leighton Mead, Dave Crosby
- Website: www.illuminatus.uk.com

Illuminatus (commonly typeset as illuminatus) are a British alternative metal band from Nottingham, England.

== History ==
=== Early years (2002–2007) ===
Illuminatus formed in 2002 and shortly afterwards entered the Battle of the Bands competition in Nottingham, winning the competition and using the prize money to record and release their first EP, Suburban Symmetry in 2002, which gained acclaim from local press.

Their first commercial release, the Aborted Revolutions EP was recorded with Harvey Birrell (Therapy?, Ministry) at Southern Studios in Wood Green, London, and was released in 2003 to good reviews, including I Will Be Heard, who described the EP as "...a dark, emotionally charged and often claustrophobic atmosphere that is performed with enthusiasm and masses of vitality, like telling a brothers Grimm tale while hiding in the shadows and then using a loud hailer..." A video for the track Wargasm was released shortly afterwards.

The success of the EP led to the band securing a space on the Darwin (Unsigned) stage at the Bloodstock Open Air festival in 2003, the first of 3 appearances at the festival with further appearances in 2004 and 2006, supporting acts such as Children of Bodom, Primal Fear and Gamma Ray. The performance introduced the band to Carbon 13 studios based in Runcorn, where they recorded their last EP, the Carbon 13 recordings. This EP was never due for commercial release and was released free to their fans at shows under an agreement with Carbon 13 studios.

From 2006 to 2007, the band went through a number of line up changes, and finally the decision was made to continue as a 4-piece without keyboards, with the band returning to the studio to re-arrange their existing tracks.

=== The Wrath of the Lambs ===
In 2008, the band began to focus on their newly recorded album, The Wrath of the Lambs, securing the release of the album through AntHill Records with distribution provided by Pinnacle. The album was released on 26 May 2008, receiving good reviews from Room Thirteen and Rock 3 Music magazine. Three videos for the tracks Black and Wait were released in 2008, and another was released in 2009 for Captive State.

To support the release, the band went on tour during July 2008, and secured dates on the UK Leg of Ministry's final UK tour, the C-U-LaTour. Their first full UK and Ireland tour took place in October 2008, supporting LA's My Ruin. and they were billed as main support on Breed77 and Susperia's UK tour in May 2009. Illuminatus were also granted the opportunity to play on three dates in June 2009 as support for Prong.

=== Glasnost ===
The end of 2009 and early 2010 saw Illuminatus return to the studio to start finalising the writing for their second album, Glasnost. In June 2010, they went to Hanover, Germany to visit the Institut für Wohlklangforschung and record the new album with Willi Dammeier. The two-week recording process was documented by the band on their website. The album was released on 7 February 2011 and gained highly praised reviews from a number of international magazines and fanzines including Circle Pit, This Is Not A Scene, Pure Rawk and Dead Press A video for Murdocracy was released on 6 May 2011.

In support of the album, the band went on a headline UK tour in February and March, and secured a slot at the 2011 Download Festival. The band also announced a three date UK tour with Sworn to Oath, and a European tour with Hawklords.

== Discography ==
=== Albums ===
- The Wrath of the Lambs (Anthill/Pinnacle / 2008)
- Glasnost (Headroom Records / 2011)

=== EPs ===
- Carbon 13 Recordings (Free Release / 2004)
- Aborted Revolutions EP (Self Released / 2003)
- Suburban Symmetry EP (Self Released / 2002)
- The Rising Tide (Self Released / 2009)
