= Scene Queen =

American singer

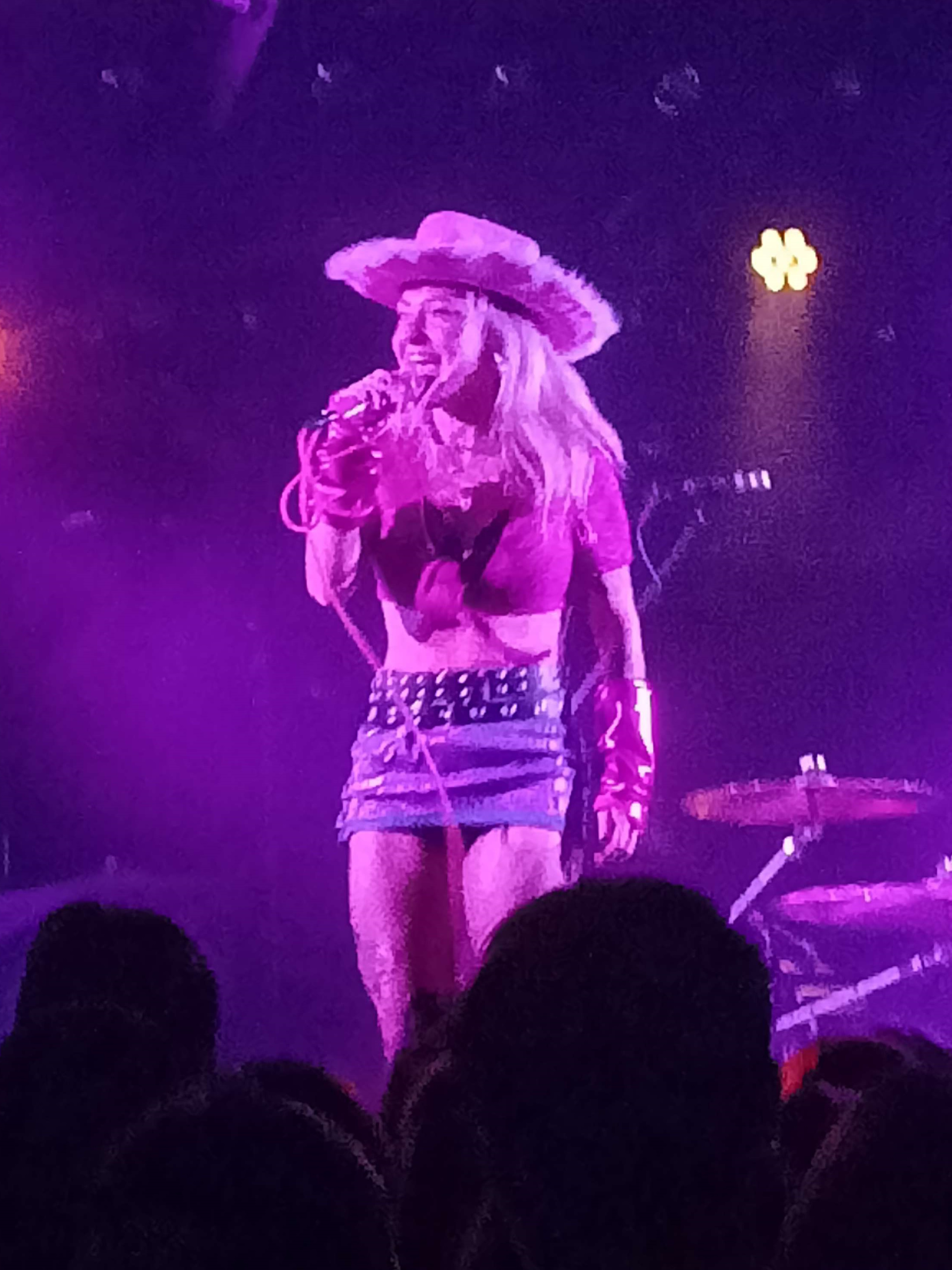
- Scene Queen performing in Warsaw, 2024

Background information
- Born: Hannah Rose Collins; May 6, 1997 (age 29); Ohio
- Genres: Metalcore; trap; hyperpop
- Occupations: Singer; songwriter
- Years active: 2020–present
- Label: Hopeless

Hannah Rose Collins (born May 6, 1997), professionally known as Scene Queen and formerly RØSÉ, is an American singer signed to Hopeless Records. She is known for coining the style "bimbocore", a subgenre of metalcore with feminist themes. She rose to fame on the social media platform TikTok, where she has garnered over 618,000 followers as of September 2023. Her debut EP Bimbocore was released in April 2022. A follow-up EP, Bimbocore Vol. 2, was released in November of that year. Her debut studio album, Hot Singles in Your Area, was released in 2024.

== Early life and career ==
Hannah Collins was born in Ohio, grew up in Upstate New York and has lived in Alabama, Ohio, and currently lives in Los Angeles, California. Growing up, she and her older sister listened to emo bands such as My Chemical Romance and Brand New. In middle school, she ran a Tumblr blog and was a fan of scene bands such as Sleeping With Sirens, Pierce The Veil and indie-pop bands such as The Ready Set. She originally intended to work on the administrative side of the music industry, hoping to land a job at Hopeless Records but decided against it. She left the scene movement in 2015 after feeling it had become misogynistic, focusing her songwriting on Pop, Hip-hop and Latin world but returned to the Alt movement where she encompassed all these genres into her music. She applied for internships at Hopeless Records 3 times.

She self-released the single "Are You Tired?" in 2020, and signed with Hopeless Records in 2021. On March 3, 2022, Scene Queen released the song "Pink Rover", a song about the objectification of women and street harassment. Her debut EP Bimbocore was released on April 29, 2022, alongside the single "Pink Panther".

Of her creative process, she said "Before writing Bimbocore I felt like if I wasn’t exactly the way the rock industry wanted me to be I would never make it. It’s through this project that I’ve been able to pull myself out of that space and be unapologetically myself. I wrote this EP to be hyper-feminine and over the top because women have spent far too long making themselves small for other people's comfort. I realized that the louder I am and the more out of the box I get, the bigger the box gets, and the more room there is for other women to get inside it."

On July 15, 2022, Scene Queen released the lead single from her second EP, "Pink G-String". The EP's second single, "Barbie & Ken", is a collaboration with American punk band Set It Off. The song was released on August 25, 2022. Scene Queen's second EP, titled Bimbocore Vol. 2, was released on November 10, 2022, along with the single "Pink Hotel".

In March 2023, Scene Queen released the lead single from her debut studio album, "18+". She spoke about the purpose of the song, which calls out sexual misconduct and predatory behavior in the alternative scene, stating, "Having people arguing over which band I might be upset with, arguing over security measures taken place in the scene, or even arguing whether the lyrics are good or just borderline unsettling is the exact point of the song: to get people talking about what we've refused to talk about in the scene the last ten years." In September 2023, Scene Queen released another single, "Pink Push-Up Bra" ahead of her tour dates in the United Kingdom. Her follow-up single, "MILF", blends country and metal in an effort to be "a conservative person's worst nightmare". The song, which was released in November 2023, was shortly followed by the announcement of Scene Queen's first full-length album, titled Hot Singles in Your Area; the album was released on June 28, 2024.

Scene Queen released her next single "Finger" in March 2024, ahead of her tour with Pvris. The following month, she released a MySpace-era inspired song, "Stuck", featuring 6arelyhuman. In May 2024, she released another single from the album, "Whips & Chains". Scene Queen played Download Festival in June, and donated her fee to charities supporting Palestine.

In July and August 2024, Scene Queen co-headlined the Idobi Radio Summer School Tour, alongside Stand Atlantic, The Home Team, and Magnolia Park, with support from Honey Revenge and Letdown. Scene Queen began a headline tour in September 2025, with events in the UK, France, Belgium, Netherlands, and Germany.

== Musical style ==
Scene Queen defines her music as "bimbocore", a "hyperfeminine offshoot of metalcore" that "blends the reclaimed hyperfeminine aesthetics and vocal distortions of genres like pop with metalcore-inspired breakdowns". Her music has been described by Kerrang! as "a jagged jigsaw of clashing sounds, combining ferocious walls of djent guitar, and thumping trap beats that come together to create a seething harshness that will draw in fans of everyone from Ghostemane to Ashnikko and Kesha."

Her song "Pretty in Pink" blends screamo vocals with nursery rhyme melodies, while "Pink Panther" is an alt-pop track that samples "The Pink Panther Theme" with lyrics about lesbian sex. Her fashion style is inspired by Y2K fashion style icons like Paris Hilton and Nicole Richie, with blonde hair and hot pink clothes.

== Personal life ==
Collins has ADHD and bipolar disorder. She has also been diagnosed with postural orthostatic tachycardia syndrome. She is bisexual and has said that her song "Pink Panther", which features themes of attraction to women, helped her come out.

Collins was in a relationship with In Her Own Words vocalist Joey Fleming, beginning in August 2023. She announced her separation from Fleming in November 2026.

== Discography ==
All credits adapted from Apple Music and Spotify.

Scene Queen discography
- Studio albums: 1
- EPs: 3
- Singles: 21
- Music videos: 13

=== Albums ===
Title	Details
Hot Singles in Your Area	Released: June 28, 2024; Label: Hopeless; Format: CD, vinyl, digital download, streaming

=== Extended plays ===
Title	Details	Peak chart positions
Title	Details	UK DL
Bimbocore	Released: April 29, 2022; Label: Hopeless; Format: Vinyl, digital download, streaming; Track listing: 1. "Bring It On"; 2. "Pretty in Pink"; 3. "Pink Bubblegum"; 4. "Pink Panther"; 5. "Pink Rover"; 6. "Pink Paper"	98
Bimbocore Vol. 2	Released: November 10, 2022; Label: Hopeless; Format: Vinyl, digital download, streaming; Track listing: 1. "Pink Whitney"; 2. "Pink G-String"; 3. "Pink Cocaine"; 4. "Pink Barbie Bandaid"; 5. "The Rapture (but it's Pink)"; 6. "Barbie & Ken"; 7. "Pink Hotel"	–
Metalicious	Released: September 11, 2026; Label: Hopeless; Format: Vinyl, digital download, streaming; Track listing: 1. "Pink Flip Phone"; 2. "Manicure"; 3. "Shopaholic"; 4. "Drop Dead Gorgeous"; 5. "Tracksuit"; 6. "Tits Out at Brunch"; 7. "Metalicious"	–

=== Singles ===
Title	Year	Album	Writer(s)	Producer(s)
"Are You Tired?"	2020	Non-album single	Hannah Collins	No producers credited
"Pretty in Pink"	2021	Bimbocore	Hannah Collins, Zach Jones, Ronald Ish	Zach Jones
"Pink Bubblegum"	2021	Bimbocore	Hannah Collins, Zach Jones, Ronald Ish	Zach Jones
"Pink Rover"	2022	Bimbocore	Hannah Collins, Zach Jones, Ronald Ish	Zach Jones
"Pink Panther"	2022	Bimbocore	Hannah Collins, Zach Jones, Ronald Ish	Zach Jones
"Pink G-String"	2022	Bimbocore, Vol. 2	Hannah Collins, Zach Jones, Rachel Kanner	Zach Jones
"Barbie & Ken" (with Set It Off)	2022	Bimbocore, Vol. 2	Hannah Collins, Zach Jones, Ronnie Ish, Cody Carson	Zach Jones
"Pink Hotel"	2022	Bimbocore, Vol. 2	Hannah Collins, Zach Jones, Rachel Kanner, Ryan Oakes, Cody Carson	Zach Jones
"18+"	2023	Hot Singles in Your Area	Hannah Collins, Zach Jones, Rachel Kanner, Jason Aalon	Zach Jones, Jason Aalon
"Pink Push-Up Bra"	2023	Hot Singles in Your Area	Hannah Collins, Zach Jones, Rachel Kanner, KJ Strock	Zach Jones
"MILF"	2023	Hot Singles in Your Area	Hannah Collins, Zach Jones, Rachel Kanner, KJ Strock	Zach Jones
"Finger"	2024	Hot Singles in Your Area	Hannah Collins, Zach Jones, Maize Olinger, Curtis Peoples	Zach Jones
"Stuck" (with 6arelyhuman)	2024	Hot Singles in Your Area	Hannah Collins, Zach Jones, Rob Nelson, Toby Hamilton	Zach Jones, Inverness
"Whips & Chains"	2024	Hot Singles in Your Area	Hannah Collins, Zach Jones, Chris Freeman, Curtis Peoples	Zach Jones
"Girls Gone Wild" (with Wargasm (UK))	2024	Hot Singles in Your Area	Hannah Collins, Zach Jones, Rachel Hastings, Rachel Kanner	Zach Jones
"The Best Thing (That Never Happened)" (We Are the In Crowd cover)	2024	Hopelessly Devoted To You: 30th Anniversary	Cameron Humphrey, John Feldmann, Jordan Eckes, Michael Ferri, Robert Chianelli, Taylor Jardine, Tommy English	Zach Jones
"L-Shaped Couch"	2025	Non-album single	Hannah Collins, Zach Jones, Nick Smith, John Kenneth Strock	Zach Jones, Nick Smith, KJ Strock
"Platform Shoes"	2025	Non-album single	Hannah Collins, Rob Nelson, John Kenneth Strock, Nick Smith, Zach Jones	Zach Jones, Nick Smith, Inverness
"Manicure"	2026	Metalicious	Hannah Collins, Zach Jones, Joseph Fleming	Zach Jones
"Tracksuit"	2026	Metalicious	Hannah Collins, Zach Jones	Zach Jones
"Metalicious" (featuring Left to Suffer)	2026	Metalicious	Hannah Collins, Zach Jones, John Kenneth Strock, Taylor Barber	Zach Jones

==== As featured artist ====
Title	Year	Album
"Win Win" (Set It Off)	2023	Non-album single

=== Music videos ===
Title	Year	Director
"Pretty in Pink"	2021	Hannah Collins
"Pink Bubblegum"	2021	Hannah Collins
"Pink Rover"	2022	Alex Bemis and Hannah Collins
"Pink Panther"	2022	Danin Jacquay
"Pink G-String"	2022	Danin Jacquay
"Barbie & Ken" (with Set It Off)	2022	Danin Jacquay
"Pink Hotel"	2022	Angelica Valente and Pseudo
"18+"	2023	Angelica Valente and Pseudo
"Pink Push-Up Bra"	2023	Angelica Valente and Pseudo
"MILF"	2023	Taylor Fauntleroy
"Finger"	2024	Angelica Valente and Pseudo
"Stuck" (with 6arelyhuman)	2024	Angelica Valente and Pseudo
"Climax"	2024	Angelica Valente and Pseudo
"Manicure"	2026	Angelica Valente and Pseudo
