= Crown Shyness =

Studio album by Trash Boat
- Released: July 20, 2018
- Studio: The Audio Compound, Orlando, Florida
- Genre: Punk rock; melodic hardcore
- Length: 36:37
- Label: Hopeless
- Producer: Andrew Wade

Trash Boat chronology
| Nothing I Write You Can Change What You've Been Through (2016) | Crown Shyness (2018) | Don't You Feel Amazing? (2021) |

Singles from Crown Shyness
- 1. "Shade" Released: 14 May 2018; 2. "Inside Out" Released: 20 June 2018; 3. "Old Soul" Released: 9 July 2018; 4. "Controlled Burn" Released: 12 April 2019

Crown Shyness is the second studio album by British punk rock band Trash Boat, released on 20 July 2018 by Hopeless Records. It was produced by Andrew Wade at The Audio Compound in Orlando.

== Background ==
Crown Shyness was recorded at The Audio Compound in Orlando, Florida with producer Andrew Wade. He mixed the album, before it was mastered by Alan Douches.

== Release ==
Trash Boat announced their second studio album, Crown Shyness, on 14 May 2018 alongside the lead single "Shade". Their second single "Inside Out" was released on 20 June. The band released their third single "Old Soul" on 19 July

The album was released on 20 July, debuting at No. 2 on Billboard's Heatseekers Albums Chart.

== Critical reception ==
Professional ratings
Review scores
| Source | Rating |
|---|---|
| New Noise | 5/5 stars |
| The Soundboard Reviews | 4/5 |
| Distorted Sound Magazine | 7/10 |
| All Things Loud | 10/10 |

The album received largely positive reviews. The Soundboard Reviews in a positive review said: "Crown Shyness is a genuinely great album, not only seeing Trash Boat settle on an identity that works for them, but also moving away from pop-punk almost entirely, now dialing up the hardcore influences that’s seen them get the most praise, as well as Wonder Years-esque alt-rock that makes this melancholy-drenched sound so much more secure in its intent."

In an 5/5 review from New Noise Magazine, Nathaniel Lay said: Trash Boat have a grittier, hardcore-influenced style of punk rock that combines the best elements of Polar Bear Club, Rise Against, and even Thrice. Their sophomore full-length with Hopeless, Crown Shyness, is a ten-track experience of pure bliss, perfectly blending melody and rage into one hard-hitting and memorable disc."

== Track listing ==
All songs written by Trash Boat.

| No. | Title | Length |
|---|---|---|
| 1. | "Inside Out" | 3:51 |
| 2. | "Shade" | 3:25 |
| 3. | "Nothing New" | 3:00 |
| 4. | "Old Soul" | 3:29 |
| 5. | "Controlled Burn" | 3:52 |
| 6. | "Don't Open Your Eyes" | 3:37 |
| 7. | "Crown Shyness" | 4:12 |
| 8. | "Silence" | 4:01 |
| 9. | "Undermine" | 3:31 |
| 10. | "Love, Hate, React, Relate" | 3:39 |
| Total length: | | 36:37 |

== Personnel ==
Personnel per booklet.

Trash Boat

- Tobi Duncan – lead vocals
- Dann Bostock – rhythm guitar
- Ryan Hyslop – lead guitar
- James Grayson – bass guitar
- Oakley Moffatt – drums

Additional Musicians

- Chris Brian Moore - cello

Production

- Andrew Wade – producer, recording, mixing
- Alan Douches – mastering

Artwork

- Sam Dunn – album artwork, layout

== Charts ==
| Chart (2018) | Peak position |
|---|---|
| US Heatseekers Albums (Billboard) | 2 |
