= Scala (club) =

Former cinema turned live music venue

Coordinates: 51.5308°N 0.1208°W

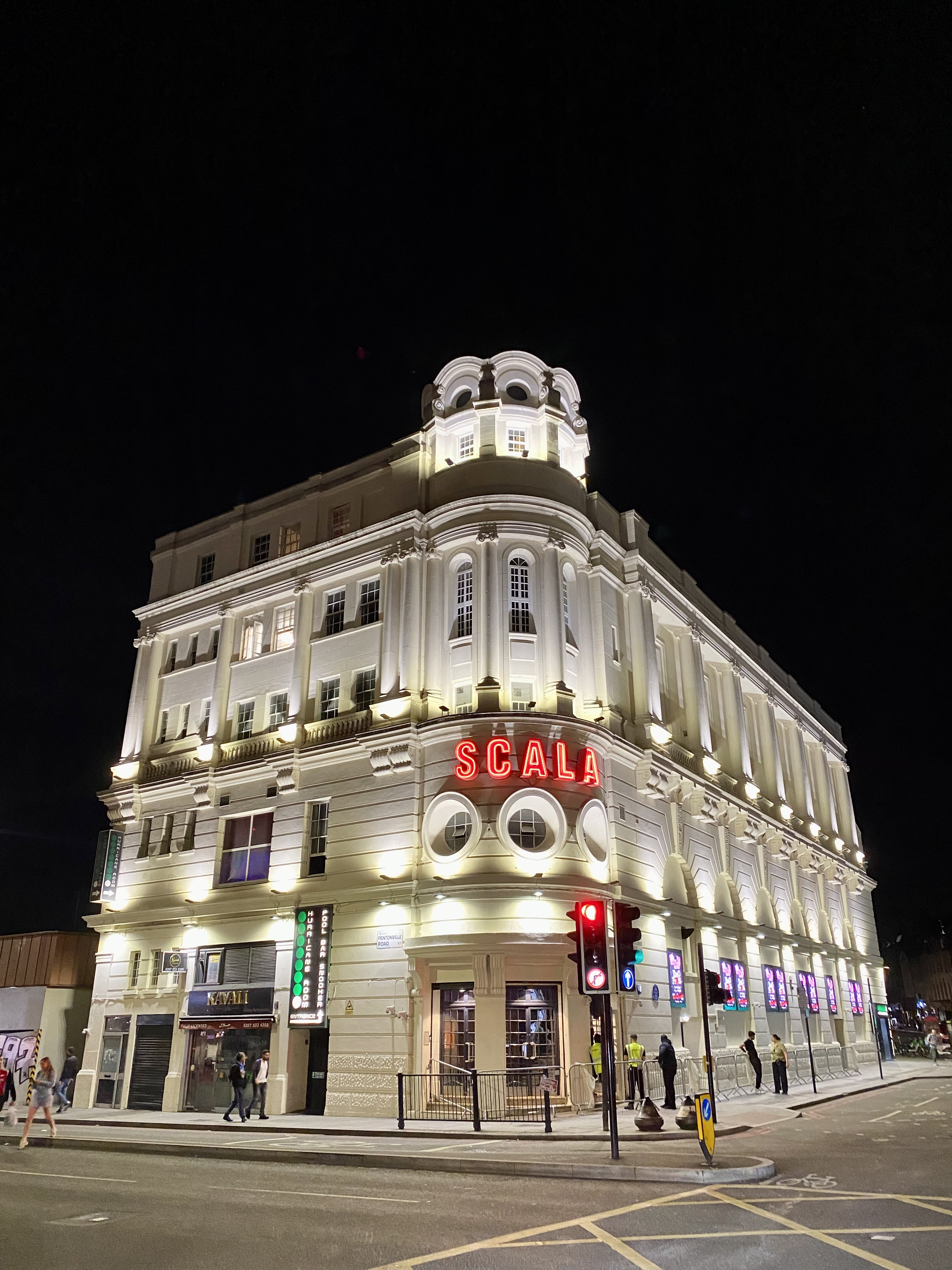
- Scala in 2024
- Interactive map of Scala
- Former names: King's Cross Cinema
- Address: 275 Pentonville Road, London N1 9NL
- Location: King's Cross, London
- Capacity: 1,145
- Type: Nightclub (previously Cinema)

Construction
- Built: 1920
- Opened: 1999

Website
- Scala.co.uk

Scala is a former cinema turned nightclub and live music venue in Pentonville Road, London, England, near King's Cross railway station.

== History ==
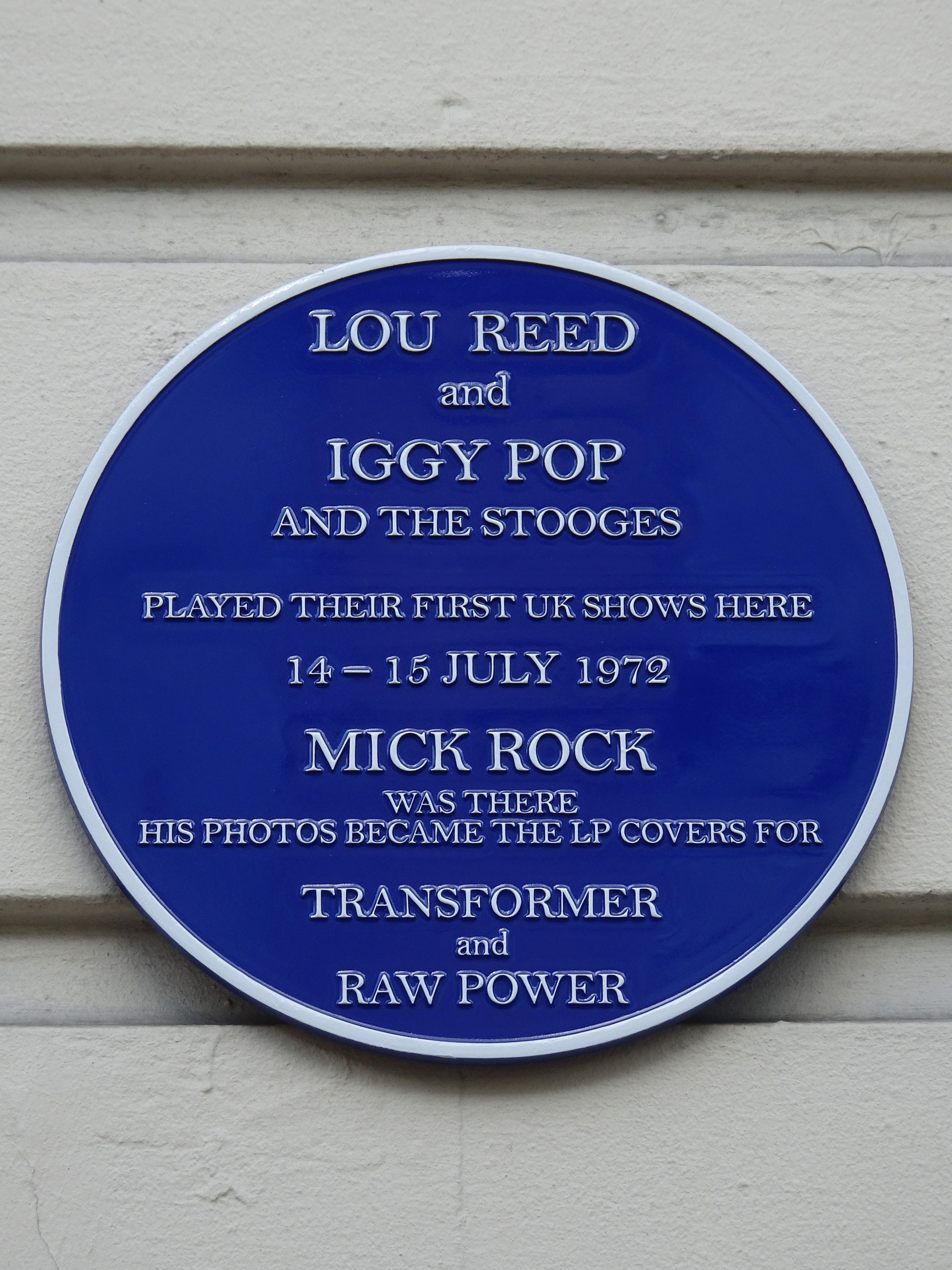
Blue plaque at 275 Pentonville Road, London, marking the gigs of 14 and 15 July 1972 at which the Stooges and Lou Reed played

The Scala was originally built as a cinema to the designs of H Courtney Constantine, but construction was interrupted by the First World War and it spent some time being used to manufacture aircraft parts, and as a labour exchange for demobilised troops before opening in 1920 as the King's Cross Cinema. The cinema changed hands and names several times through its life and also changed focus, ranging from mainstream to art-house to adult film over 70 years, as well as spending a short time as a primatarium.

In the summer of 1972, the King's Cross Cinema played host to the only UK concert by Iggy & The Stooges, who were in London recording the album Raw Power. All photographs later featured in the Raw Power album sleeve (including the famous cover shot) were taken that night during the show by Mick Rock. The cover shot of the Lou Reed LP Transformer was also taken that summer at the venue by Rock as well.

Intended to be an alternative National Film Theatre, the Scala Film Club (which took its name from Scala House, its home on Tottenham Street) moved to this venue in 1981 under the management of Stephen Woolley. However, when the Scala showed the film A Clockwork Orange, then withdrawn from UK distribution, the copyright holder Warner Bros. sued at Kubrick's insistence, and won. As a result, Scala was almost rendered bankrupt and closed in 1993; however, the club was re-opened in 1999. The cinema had been refitted, with the lower seating area incorporating the new stage, DJ booth and dancefloor, while the upper seating area incorporated a second room and a DJ booth.

Scala now plays host to many eclectic club nights, and has featured live music acts including Jon Boden, The Midnight, Smoke Fairies, Shed Seven, The Libertines, Deftones, Slaves, Outlandish, Laibach, London Elektricity, Coldplay, Tash Sultana, Foo Fighters, The Killers, Gorillaz, Big Talk, Moby, HIM, Wheatus, Wargasm, Adam Ant, Sheryl Crow, Sara Bareilles, Gavin DeGraw, Ray LaMontagne, Trampled by Turtles, Doomtree, Super Furry Animals, The Chemical Brothers, Avril Lavigne, Enslaved, Spandau Ballet, Gorgoroth, Lacuna Coil, Maroon 5, The Script, Melanie C, KLOQ, Gabrielle Aplin, Piri, Bastille, Wolf Alice, JAWS, Kaiser Chiefs, Jedi Mind Tricks, P!nk, Louis Tomlinson The Iterations and FEET.

== Shock Around The Clock ==
In the 1980s, the Scala Cinema was known for its Shock Around The Clock horror all-nighters which would programme films such as The Living Dead at the Manchester Morgue and Martin. Shock Around The Clock would be a precursor to the London FrightFest Film Festival, which ran in the 21st Century at various cinemas in and around Leicester Square.

== Controversy ==
In 2021, Wargasm singer Sam Matlock stated that security staff at Scala had assaulted him, where the bouncers "dragged" him into the toilets, "slammed his head against the toilet seat" and "held his head in the toilet bowl". Scala banned the bouncers involved from the club.

== Movies and popular culture ==
The Scala's years as a cinema club in Tottenham Street and King's Cross are chronicled in the book SCALA CINEMA 1978-1993 written by Jane Giles and edited by Ali Catterall (FAB Press, 2018) and the film SCALA!!! Or, the incredibly strange rise and fall of the world’s wildest cinema and how it influenced a mixed-up generation of weirdos and misfits (directors: Ali Catterall, Jane Giles, 2023).
