= Venom (Wargasm album) =

2023 studio album by Wargasm

Studio album by Wargasm
- Released: 27 October 2023
- Recorded: 2022–2023
- Genre: Nu metal; synth-punk; digital hardcore; big beat; industrial metal
- Length: 40:35
- Label: Slowplay; Republic
- Producer: Charlie Russell

Wargasm chronology
Explicit: The Mixxxtape (2022)	Venom (2023)

Singles from Venom
- 1. "Do It So Good" Released: 14 July 2023; 2. "Bang Ya Head" Released: 8 September 2023; 3. "Modern Love" Released: 13 October 2023

Venom is the debut studio album by the English electronic rock duo Wargasm, released through Slowplay and Republic Records on 27 October 2023. The album includes a collaboration with Limp Bizkit frontman Fred Durst. It was announced alongside the release of the single "Do It So Good". The album is produced by Charlie Russell, with additional production by Wargasm and Kieron Pepper.

== Background ==
The duo announced in July 2023 that they had spent the "last 16 months [...] perfecting" the album during downtime from touring.

== Critical reception ==
Professional ratings
Aggregate scores
Source	Rating
Metacritic	81/100
Review scores
Source	Rating
Clash	7/10
Dork	4/5 stars
Kerrang!	4/5
The Line of Best Fit	8/10
Metal Hammer	4/5 stars
NME	4/5 stars

Venom received a score of 81 out of 100 on review aggregator Metacritic based on four critics' reviews, indicating "universal acclaim".

Metal Hammer's Merlin Alderslade wrote that "bashing together elements of punk, metal, EDM and hip hop [...] Venom is a relentlessly entertaining ride, driven by sheer energy", calling it "one of 2023's essential debut albums".

Ali Shutler of Dork called the album "pure, screaming catharsis" as well as the band "the spiritual successor to Limp Bizkit", summarising that it "build[s] on everything that's come before, while amping up the carnage, the energy and the emotion, Wargasm's debut album is a lesson in excess".

NME's Rishi Shah called it "a consistent album [...] with a significantly raw feel" that "cements Wargasm's position as one of UK heavy music's leading forces".

Lana Williams of The Line of Best Fit described it as "a rip-roaring effort from Wargasm", also finding that "where it stands apart from typical Wargasm-feats is in its objectively quieter, more indulgent breaks" as on "Death Rattle" and "Ride the Thunder".

Reviewing the album for Clash, Caitlin Chatterton felt that "despite the odd lapse in power, Venom is a super-charged and dramatic record characteristic of Wargasm’s spirit".

Emma Wilkes of Kerrang! concluded that it is "a satisfying, feisty record made for blasting loud enough to annoy the neighbours, and for partying the existential dread away. This band's not cooling down anytime soon."

== Track listing ==
Venom track listing
No.	Title	Writer(s)	Length
1.	"Introduction"	Rachel Hastings; Sam Matlock	0:57
2.	"Venom"	Hastings; Matlock	3:35
3.	"Minigun"	Hastings; Matlock	2:20
4.	"Death Rattle"	Hastings; Matlock; Adam Crilly; Björk Guðmundsdóttir; Graham Massey; Charlie Russell	3:12
5.	"Ride the Thunder"	Hastings; Matlock; Kieron Pepper; Russell	3:01
6.	"Do It So Good"	Hastings; Matlock; Pepper; Russell	3:22
7.	"Bang Ya Head" (featuring Fred Durst)	Hastings; Matlock; Jason Aalon Butler; Fred Durst; Zach Jones; Pepper; Russell	3:36
8.	"Feral"	Hastings; Matlock; Pepper; Russell	3:16
9.	"Sonic Dog Tag"	Hastings; Matlock; Pepper	4:26
10.	"Modern Love"	Hastings; Matlock; Dana Dentata; Ben Havok; Pepper; Russell; Michael Taylor	3:28
11.	"S.A.D."	Hastings; Matlock; Pepper; Tyler Smith	3:30
12.	"Outrage"	Hastings; Matlock; Pepper	3:28
13.	"Sombre Goodbye"	Hastings; Matlock; Pepper; Russell	2:19
Total length:			40:30

== Personnel ==
Wargasm

- Sam Matlock – vocals, guitar, programming, additional production (all tracks); drums (track 4)
- Milkie Way – vocals, bass guitar, programming, additional production; drums (track 4)

Additional contributors

- Charlie Russell – production, mixing, engineering, recording, keyboards, programming
- Kieron Pepper – additional production, keyboards, programming
- Chris Allgood – mastering
- Emily Lazar – mastering
- Pieter Rietkerk – recording
- Adam Breeze – drums (tracks 1–3, 5–9, 11–13)
- Jonny Solway – immersive mix engineering (track 6)
- Fred Durst – vocals (track 7)
- Zach Jones – additional production (track 7)
- Ben Havok – guitar (track 10)
- Michael Taylor – programming (track 10)

== Charts ==
Chart performance for Venom
Chart (2023)	Peak position
Scottish Albums (OCC)	30
UK Albums (OCC)	88
UK Rock & Metal Albums (OCC)	3
