= Trash Boat =

British punk rock band

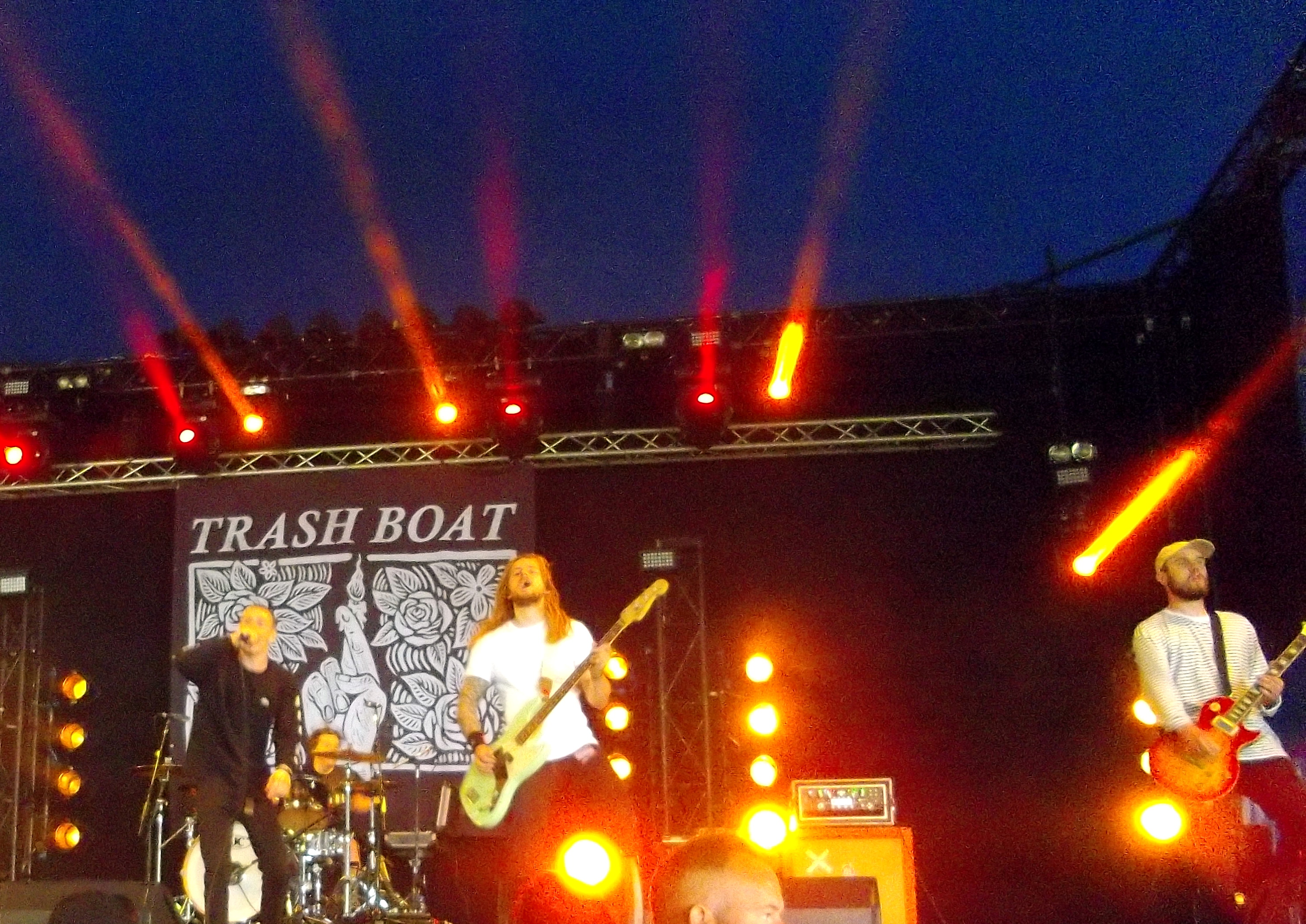
- Trash Boat performing at Download Festival 2017. From left to right: Tobi Duncan, Oakley Moffatt, James Grayson, Ryan Hyslop

Background information
- Origin: St Albans, Hertfordshire, England
- Genres: Pop punk; skate punk; melodic hardcore; post-hardcore
- Years active: 2014–present
- Label: Hopeless
- Members: Dann Bostock; Tobi Duncan; James Grayson; Ryan Hyslop; Oakley Moffatt

Trash Boat are a British punk rock band formed in St Albans in 2014. The group consist of Tobi Duncan (lead vocals), Dann Bostock (rhythm guitar, backing vocals), Ryan Hyslop (lead guitar), James Grayson (bass, backing vocals), and Oakley Moffatt (drums).

The group have released three EPs, and four studio albums. Look Alive was released independently in 2014, while Brainwork was released after signing with Hopeless Records in 2015. The band's debut album, Nothing I Write You Can Change What You've Been Through, was released on 17 June 2016; their second, Crown Shyness, was released on 20 July 2018; and the band's third album Don't You Feel Amazing? was released on 13 August 2021. The band's latest album, Heaven Can Wait, was released on 4 October 2024. An EP titled Even If I Never Get There was released on 30 January 2026.

== History ==
=== Formation and debut EP (2014) ===
The group was formed in St Albans in 2014, taking their name from an episode of Regular Show. The band independently released their first EP, Look Alive, 23 June 2014.

=== Signing and Nothing I Write You Can Change What You've Been Through (2015–2017) ===
On 17 March 2015, Trash Boat announced their signing to Hopeless Records and released an EP titled Brainwork on 18 May 2015. On 24 May 2015, the group performed at the 2015 Slam Dunk Festival. In August 2015, Trash Boat supported New Found Glory on a tour in England. The band's debut album, Nothing I Write You Can Change What You've Been Through, was released on 17 June 2016. The group performed at the 2016 Reading and Leeds Festivals. Throughout December of the same year, Trash Boat supported Beartooth on the group's UK tour.

=== Crown Shyness (2018–2020) ===
The band announced their second studio album, Crown Shyness, on 14 May 2018 alongside the lead single "Shade". The album was released on 20 July 2018 through Hopeless Records. It debuted at No. 2 on Billboard's Heatseekers Albums Chart.

Trash Boat then released the single "Synthetic Sympathy" on 29 August 2019. The Band covered the Linkin Park song "Given Up" for the compilation album Songs That Saved My Life Volume 2.

=== Don't You Feel Amazing? (2021–2023) ===
In February 2021, Trash Boat released the single "He's So Good" as well as merchandise inspired by the song. The profit from these designs is being donated to LGBTQ+ Youth charity group AKT. They released their third album, Don't You Feel Amazing?, on 13 August 2021, through Hopeless Records.

=== Heaven Can Wait and Even If I Never Get There (2024–present) ===
The band released their fourth studio album, Heaven Can Wait, on 4 October 2024, once again through Hopeless Records.

The band released an EP titled Even If I Never Get There on 30 January 2026.

== Musical style and influences ==
The group's music has been characterized as pop punk, melodic hardcore, skate punk and post-hardcore however heavier than a majority of their peers thanks to a "purer and grittier style", Duncan's raw and emotional voice and their punk (rather than pop)-leanings.

In their early career, the entire band were influenced by pop punk and punk artists while vocalist Tobi Duncan's interests in hardcore punk and metal music and Bostock's ska influence have also shaped the group's sound. The band have cited influences from bands such as Have Heart, Trophy Eyes, Turnstile, La Dispute, Can't Swim, Movements, Title Fight, the Misfits, the Sex Pistols, Rise Against, Thrice, Blink-182, Polar Bear Club and Sum 41. Duncan has cited the poets W. B. Yeats and Emily Brontë as a major influence on his lyric writing.

On Don't You Feel Amazing? (2021), they abandonded pop-punk influence. For the album, the band drew influence from System of a Down, Muse, Yungblud, Nine Inch Nails and Placebo. For the album's debut single "He's so Good", the band were influenced by Rise Against, Against Me!, Nirvana, Blur, Bleachers, Nothing but Thieves, Wavves, Charlie Puth, Frank Ocean, Taylor Swift, Beyoncé, Beck and Kevin Abstract.

== Band members ==
- Tobi Duncan – lead vocals
- Dann Bostock – rhythm guitar, backing vocals
- Ryan Hyslop – lead guitar
- James Grayson – bass guitar, backing vocals
- Oakley Moffatt – drums

== Discography ==
Studio albums

Title	Album details
Nothing I Write You Can Change What You've Been Through	Released: 17 June 2016; Label: Hopeless; Format: CD, DL, LP
Crown Shyness	Released: 20 July 2018; Label: Hopeless; Format: CD, DL, LP
Don't You Feel Amazing?	Released: 13 August 2021; Label: Hopeless; Format: CD, DL, LP
Heaven Can Wait	Released: 4 October 2024; Label: Hopeless; Format: CD, DL, LP

Extended plays

Title	Album details
Look Alive	Released: 23 June 2014; Label: Self-released; Format: DL
Brainwork	Released: 18 May 2015; Label: Hopeless; Format: CD, DL
Even If I Never Get There	Released: 30 January 2026; Label: Format: DL, LP

Singles

Title	Year	Album
"Boneless"	2014	Look Alive
"Perspective"	2015	Brainwork
"Shade"	2018	Crown Shyness
"Inside Out"	2018	Crown Shyness
"Old Soul"	2018	Crown Shyness
"Controlled Burn"	2019	Crown Shyness
"Synthetic Sympathy"	2019	Don't You Feel Amazing?
"He's So Good"	2021	Don't You Feel Amazing?
"Bad Entertainment" (featuring Milkie Way)	2021	Don't You Feel Amazing?
"Delusions of Grandeur"	2023	Heaven Can Wait
"Liar Liar"	2023	Heaven Can Wait
"Break You"	2024	Heaven Can Wait
"Be Someone" (featuring Eric Vanlerberghe)	2024	Heaven Can Wait
"Better Than Yesterday"	2024	Heaven Can Wait
"Are You Ready Now?"	2024	Heaven Can Wait

Music videos

Title	Year	Director
"Boneless"	2015	Unknown
"Perspective"	2015	Richard Dimery
"Eleven"	2015	Ian Coulson
"Strangers" (feat. Dan Campbell)	2016	Christopher Porter
"How Selfish I Seem"	2016	Christopher Porter
"The Guise of a Mother"	2016	Bradley Allen
"Tring Quarry"	2017	Adam Webb
"Shade"	2018	Lewis Cater
"Inside Out"	2018	Long Shot
"Old Soul"	2018	Long Shot
"Controlled Burn"	2019	Adam Webb
"He's So Good"	2021	Zak Pinchin
"Silence Is Golden"	2021	Adam Webb
"Don't You Feel Amazing?"	2021	Zak Pinchin
"Delusions Of Grandeur"	2023	Zak Pinchin
"Liar Liar"	2023	Oakley Moffatt
"Break You"	2024	Oakley Moffatt
"Be Someone" (feat. Eric Vanlerberghe)	2024	Zak Pinchin
