= Wargasm =

British/Irish electronic rock duo

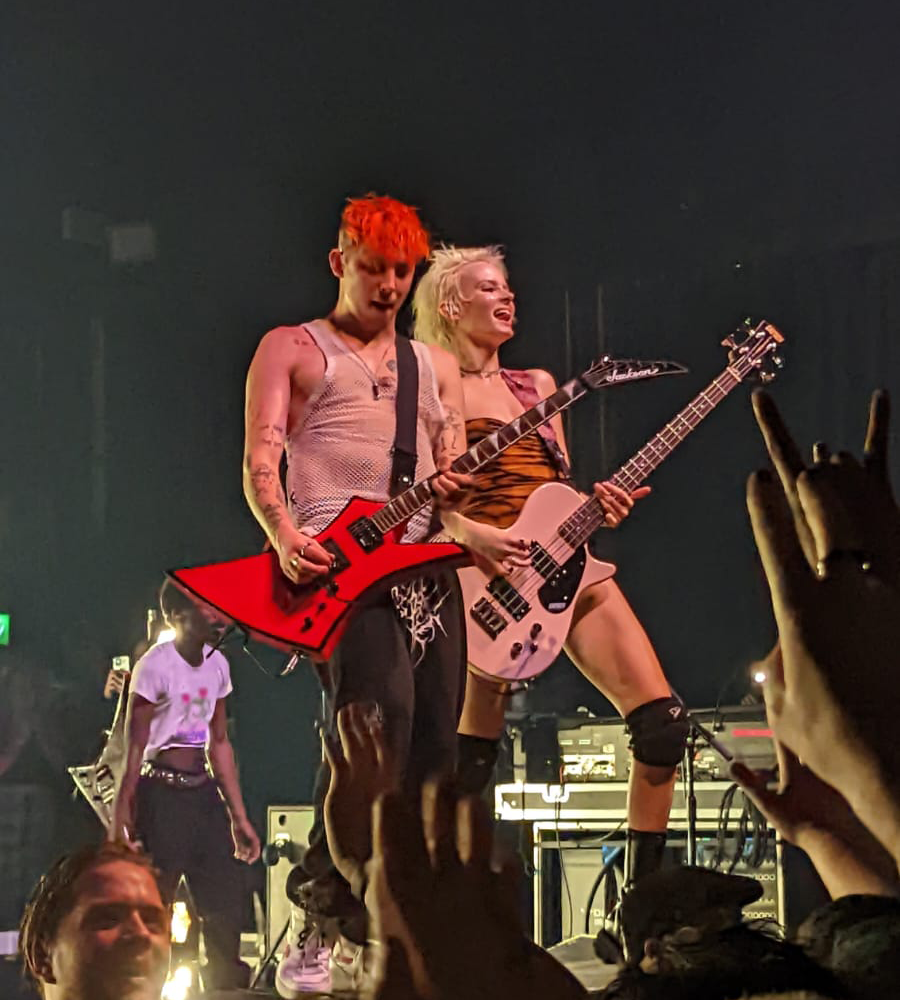
- Wargasm performing in London, 2022

Background information
- Also known as: Wargasm (UK)
- Origin: London, England
- Genres: Electropunk; digital hardcore; nu metal; post-hardcore
- Years active: 2018–present
- Labels: Slowplay; Republic; Hopeless
- Members: Milkie Way; Sam Matlock
- Website: wargasm.online

Wargasm (stylised in all caps and sometimes known as Wargasm (UK)) are a British electronic rock duo from London. The band was formed in 2018 by Sam Matlock, who had previously performed as part of Dead!, and Milkie Way, who had previously photographed their concerts. The band released several standalone singles before making headlines in 2021 over an incident after a performance at Scala. Their 2022 mixtape Explicit: The Mixxxtape charted at No. 19 on the UK Rock & Metal Albums Chart and appeared on Loudwire's "Best Rock + Metal Debut Albums of 2022", while their debut studio album Venom peaked at No. 88 on the UK Albums Chart and No. 3 in the UK Rock & Metal Albums Chart in 2023.

Critics commonly categorise the band's music as electro-punk, nu metal, and riot grrrl. The band, their 2022 Enter Shikari collaboration "The Void Stares Back", Explicit: The Mixxxtape, and Venom have all been nominated for various awards at the Heavy Music Awards. Alternative Press listed them as a defining part of the 2020s wave of nu metal, and NME listed them as one of 2021's essential emerging artists. The pair also took home Best New Noise at the 2022 Kerrang! Awards.

== History ==
=== 2018–2021: Formation and early performances ===
When I decided I wanted to do a new project, I knew I wanted it to have a riot grrrl attitude with female vocals and two characters at play, almost like you were getting two sides to a story and a conversation over the music. And that's exactly what Milkie brought to the party. The idea was for this to be the Keith Flint and Courtney Love collaboration that never was.

— Matlock talking to Kerrang! in February 2022

Sam Matlock met Milkie Way when she was hired to film his band Dead!. In 2018, after the band disbanded, Matlock approached Way, who by then had taken a job modelling in Tokyo, and bonded with her over a shared love of nu metal acts such as Limp Bizkit. At first the pair began writing pop punk songs and recorded an EP in that style called Sadgasm, which they opted not to release. Following an incident at a party in London that both had attended at Way's suggestion, in which Matlock had managed to wake up an unenthusiastic crowd by playing Limp Bizkit and then Linkin Park, the band diversified into a combination of rap and nu metal.

They formed Wargasm in August 2019, taking their name from the L7 song of the same name; the pair used a June 2020 interview to state that the "War" half of their name signified "this kind of angry, visceral red energy" and that the "gasm" half signified "the euphoria that you get when you listen to a song and think [that] this is so fucking hard". Wargasm are listed as "Wargasm (UK)" in several territories due to the existence of other bands from the United States, Finland, Sweden and France. They released their debut single, "Post Modern Rhapsody", in August 2019, before playing their first live performance a few weeks later at a toilet venue. They then released "God of War" that November; it was later used as the theme for NXT UK. In February 2020, they released a cover version of "Lapdance" by N.E.R.D. alongside a music video. Initially a SoundCloud-only release, the track was recorded as an exercise in how to best juggle their vocals after Matlock heard the track at a club, and was the first non-pop punk track they recorded. They then released their own composition, "Gold Gold Gold", later that month.

Shortly before the first UK COVID-19 lockdown, they played a socially distanced show with Death Blooms supporting them. They then flew from London to Way's parents' house to write. There, they recorded subsequent singles "Spit", "Rage All Over", and "Backyard Bastards"; they released the first of these in June. Later that month, they performed a set for Download TV, that year's virtual derivative of Download Festival, which they recorded in their kitchen. That September, they played a set for that year's Heavy Music Awards and released "Backyard Bastards", which they released a music video for the following month. The month after that, they released the single "Rage All Over", which they had written about their own rage at the declining condition of the world. At the start of January 2021, NME listed them as one of their essential emerging artists for the following year.

That April, they released the single "Your Patron Saints", a track about loneliness and isolation they had written after one of the band had a small breakdown in a supermarket, which they followed in June with "Pyro Pyro", which served as the song's B-side. Later that month, they performed at the 2021 Download Festival Pilot, and then the month after that, Alternative Press listed them as a defining part of the 2020s wave of nu metal. In August 2021, they announced their debut UK headline tour, with dates booked between 17 and 30 November 2021, and that they would tour with Creeper the month after. Later that August, they released the single "Salma Hayek", performed at the 2021 Reading and Leeds Festivals and at ALT+LDN festival, and featured on a remix of Death Blooms' single "Shut Up". The following month, they won "Best UK Breakthrough" at the Heavy Music Awards.

=== 2021–present: Explicit: The Mixxxtape and Venom ===
A November 2021 gig at Scala was marred by its security guards assaulting Matlock after they had performed, prompting the venue to fire several of its bouncers and set out a number of planned security measures for its subsequent performances. Later that month, the band released "Scratchcard Feeling", a track about continuing to feel lucky despite continued losses. The band then supported Neck Deep on a UK tour in early 2022. The following month, Rolling Stone reported that Wargasm would be joining Limp Bizkit on their North American "Still Sucks" tour. That May, Matlock and Way announced that they had signed to Slowplay and Republic Records and would release a single, "D.R.I.L.D.O.", and a mixtape, Explicit: The Mixxxtape. The mixtape was named Explicit due to the presence of swearing and sexual lyrics, and the single "D.R.I.L.D.O." was released later that month. The month after, they performed at that year's Download Festival, at which they were the only band to play the main stage to not be all-male. They then won the New Noise Awards at that year's Kerrang! Awards.

In July, the band released "Fukstar", a rant against the behaviour of high-net-worth individuals. The month after that, they featured on Enter Shikari's "The Void Stares Back", which won Best Single at the 2023 Heavy Music Awards. In September 2022, they released Explicit, which included previous singles "Pyro Pyro", "Salma Hayek", "D.R.I.L.D.O" and "Fukstar" and focus track "Super Fiend". The mixtape was nominated for Best Breakthrough Album at the 2023 Heavy Music Awards, appeared on Loudwire's "Best Rock + Metal Debut Albums of 2022", and charted at No. 19 on the UK Rock & Metal Albums Chart. They promoted Explicit by going on the Explicit Tour, which featured dates in Manchester, Glasgow, Nottingham, and at O2 Forum Kentish Town. At the end of that year, they toured with Enter Shikari and Limp Bizkit. That December, they released a new video for "Super Fiend" featuring tour footage, followed by a cover of the Girls Aloud song "Something Kinda Ooooh" for Amazon Music. In May 2023, it was announced that Wargasm would support Corey Taylor on his 2023 CMF2 tour between August and October.

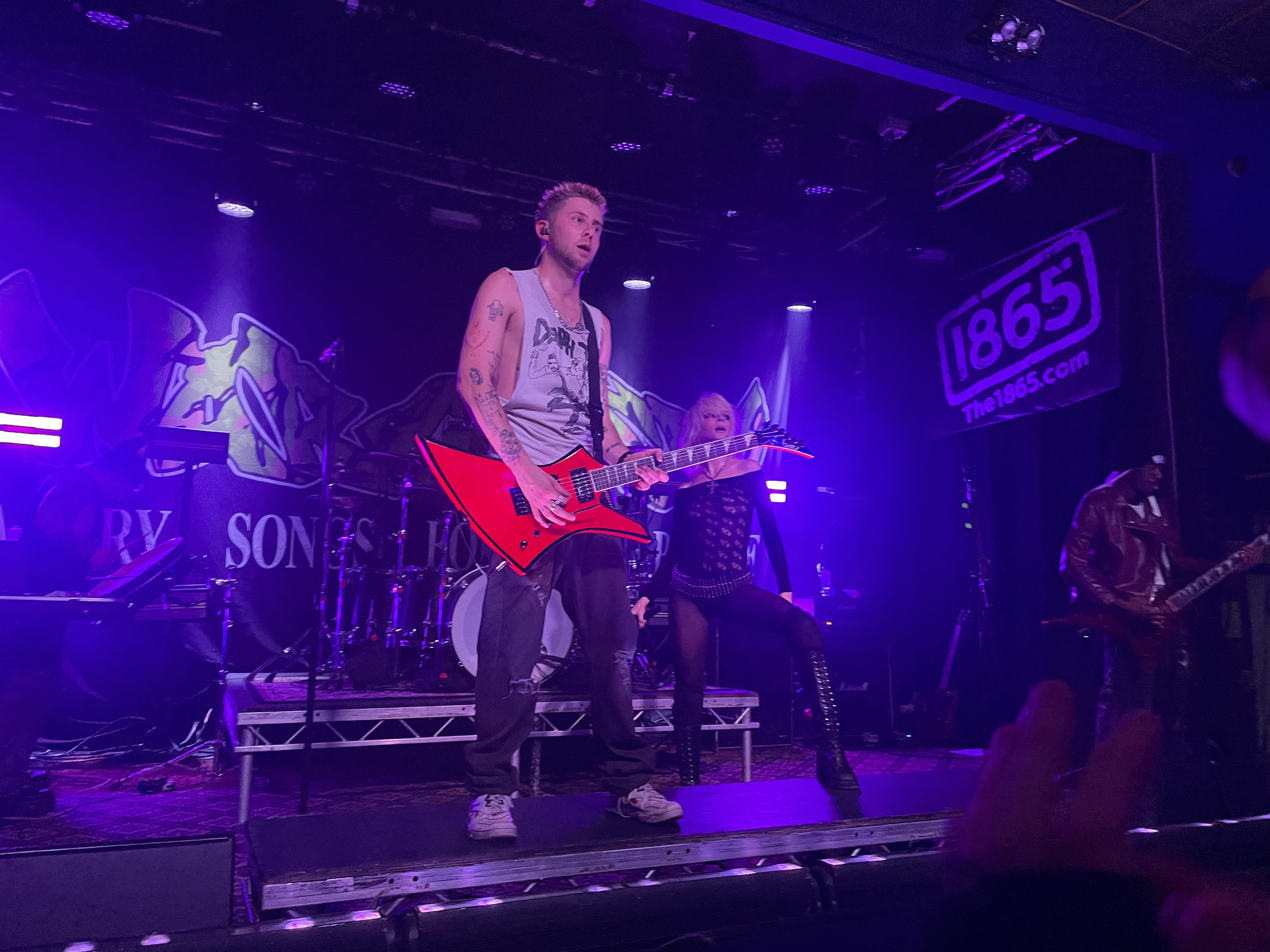
Wargasm performing in Southampton in 2023

In July 2023, they announced the album Venom and released the single "Do It So Good". The album took sixteen months to make, with the band using a December 2023 Kerrang! interview to blame the discontinuous manner in which it was produced and "labels and distributors, and all these people who don't seem to be able to do their fucking job anymore". Many of the tracks pre-dated Explicit due to the band working on both concurrently. In September, they released "Bang Ya Head", which was written about Matlock's experience of struggling to live on a bar salary. Both it and Venom's introduction featured Fred Durst as a result of the band direct messaging him. They released "Modern Love" in October, a track about technology-induced loneliness, which was followed a few days later by a video and followed by a few days after that by "Molotov", an album track on Ho99o9's mixtape Ho99o9 presents Territory: Turf Talk, Vol. II. Later that month, they released Venom, which charted at No. 88 in the UK Albums Chart and was nominated for Best Breakthrough Album at the 2024 Heavy Music Awards.

In May 2024, the band featured on Crossfaith's "God Speed", an ode to hedonism, followed by "Hedonist (Recharged)", a track from Bad Omens' Concrete Jungle [The OST], an expansion pack to their earlier album The Death of Peace of Mind. The following month, they appeared on Scene Queen's "Girls Gone Wild", a track about misogynistic double standards from her album Hot Singles in Your Area. That July, the band announced a livestream from a tank graveyard and released "70% Dead", a collaboration with Corey Taylor which had been recorded while the band were on tour with him. The month after, they supported Korn at Gunnersbury Park alongside Loathe and Spiritbox and announced their Club Shit tour of intimate venues for October and November. Harpy supported the band for some of these gigs, while their Komedia gig featured Eville and Karen Dio as support. By October, they had headlined the Cave stage at 2000trees festival; that month, they released the singles "Circle Pit" and "Bad Seed", a track previously released in Japan and a track about trolls, alongside a joint music video. In April 2025, Wargasm released the single "Vigilantes" and stated that they were independent artists. In July 2025, the band released a collaboration with Pendulum. The single, titled "Cannibal", was released on July 25, after a number of performances during Pendulum's summer tour earlier that year. During the initial live debut, the band joined Pendulum on-stage for the track.

In March 2026, they confirmed work on a second full album to be almost done, although with no target release date. In August, the band announced they had signed with Hopeless Records.

== Artistry ==
In a January 2020 interview with Crowdsurf & Turf, Way noted that the band's style and visuals were "very influenced by dystopian pop culture monoliths like Bladerunner [sic] and Akira, [...] old shitty cock rock bands, and punk icons like Joan Jett and Iggy Pop". Matlock used the same interview to note that the band took "huge" sonic influence "from the 00s and a bunch of metal bands", as well as their own punk attitudes, conversations they overheard, and their own personal opinions. The following month, the band used an interview with Kerrang! to cite the use of nu-metal tropes by Loathe, Shvpes and Poppy as inspirational, and that August, they cited L7 as an inspiration in an interview with Upset. When asked in an early 2021 interview with Fred Perry what songs' lyrics inspired them, Matlock answered "Custer" by Slipknot and Way answered "Smack a Bitch - Remix" by Rico Nasty. For "Pyro Pyro", they were inspired by a scene in a documentary about Grimes which asserted that she used laser shots from video games and gunshots to construct her music, and for "Salma Hayek", its chorus was inspired by Kim Petras and its video was inspired by Quentin Tarantino.

In June 2020, Revolver described the band's works as "a particularly now mash-up of nu-metal, punk, electronic music, pop, hip-hop and anything else they damn please" [sic], and in September 2020, that publication's Emma Madden described the band's sound as "beefcake nu-metal [...] spike[d] with more lighthearted pop and electronic elements [and] a riot grrrl ethos and charge". The following month, Metal Hammer writer Yasmine Summan described their works as "nihilistic nu metal with electro-punk attitude", and then in December 2020, that publication's Matt Mills described the band as nu-metal and "in-your-face riot grrrl punk". In January 2021, Alternative Press writer Giedrė Matulaitytė described their music as an "eclectic blend of punk/riot grrrl attitude, hardcore energy, grunge pessimism and murky nü-metal groove" best enjoyed while "sipping on some rich blood" and Jack Saunders described them as post-hardcore and a combination of the Prodigy and Slipknot. In October 2023, Gregory Adams of Revolver described their "musical bedrock" as "hard-blitzed house beats and nu-metal swagger".

Reviewing their Download Pilot set, Clash observed "screaming vocals, stadium beats and psychedelic electronic sounds that merge with a punk attitude and a guitar grounding" and NME writer Ali Shutler described what he saw as "cyberpunk". The latter publication's Kyann-Sian Williams wrote of their performance at ALT+LDN that the pair "infuse the raw grit of screamo with Way's punk vocals". Jack Rogers of Rock Sound wrote that "Pyro Pyro" "combusts with blasts of distorted bass and harsh guitars", while Olivia Stock of Riot described "Salma Hayek" as a combination of "metal, punk, rap, dubstep, and pop". Reviewing a 2022 Neck Deep support slot for Louder Than War, Daniel Tsourekas complimented the contrast between Matlock's "gritty" vocals and Way's "softer yet punk-infused" vocals. James Christopher Monger of AllMusic wrote that the "electro-punk duo" evoked "Poppy by way of Limp Bizkit" with their "kinetic blend of nu-metal, industrial rock, post-hardcore, EDM, and hip-hop". In October 2023, Dannii Leivers of Metal Hammer described their post-pop punk works as "a frenetic, kaleidoscopic clash of digital hardcore and electronica with the hooks, heaviness and attitude of nu metal" and the band as "looking like the Wikipedia definition of modern rock stars".

== Members ==
- Milkie Way – vocals, bass guitar, guitar, production
- Sam Matlock – vocals, guitar, production

Touring

- Edison Hunter – guitar
- Adam Crilly – electronics, vocals
- Adam Breeze – drums (also studio member)

== Discography ==
=== Studio albums ===
List of albums, with selected chart positions
Title	Album details	Peak chart positions		
Title	Album details	UK	UK Rock	SCO
Venom	Released: 27 October 2023; Format: CD, digital, LP; Label: Republic Records	88	3	30

=== Mixtapes ===
List of albums, with selected chart positions
Title	Album details	Peak chart positions
Title	Album details	UK Rock
Explicit: The Mixxxtape	Released: 9 September 2022; Format: CD, digital, LP; Label: Republic Records	19

=== Compilation albums ===
List of albums, with selected chart positions
Title	Album details	Ref.
A Year of War	Released: 2021; Format: Vinyl; Label: Venn Records	

=== Singles ===
Title	Year	LP	Ref.
"Post Modern Rhapsody"	2019	Non-album singles	
"God of War"	2019	Non-album singles	
"Gold Gold Gold"	2020	Non-album singles	
"Lapdance"	2020	Non-album singles	
"Spit."	2020	Non-album singles	
"Backyard Bastards"	2020	Non-album singles	
"Rage All Over"	2020	Non-album singles	
"Your Patron Saints"	2021	Non-album singles	
"Pyro Pyro"	2021	Explicit: The Mixxxtape	
"Salma Hayek"	2021	Explicit: The Mixxxtape	
"Scratchcard Feeling"	2021	Non-album single	
"D.R.I.L.D.O"	2022	Explicit: The Mixxxtape	
"Fukstar"	2022	Explicit: The Mixxxtape	
"Do It So Good"	2023	Venom	
"Bang Ya Head" (featuring Fred Durst)	2023	Venom	
"Modern Love"	2023	Venom	
"70% Dead" (featuring Corey Taylor)	2024	Non-album singles	
"Vigilantes"	2025	Non-album singles	
"Small World Syndrome"	2025	Non-album singles	
"Get Down"	2026	Non-album singles	
"Swallow"	2026	Non-album singles	

==== As a featured artist ====
Year	Title	Album	Ref.
2021	"Spoiler (Recoil)" (DJ Hyper featuring Wargasm)	Non-album single	
2021	"The Cycle" (Death Tour featuring Wargasm)	Scared?	
2021	"Shut Up" (Death Blooms featuring Wargasm)	Non-album single	
2022	"The Void Stares Back" (Enter Shikari featuring Wargasm)	Dancing on the Frontline	
2024	"God Speed" (Crossfaith featuring Wargasm)	Ark	
2024	"Girls Gone Wild" (Scene Queen featuring Wargasm)	Hot Singles in Your Area	
2025	"Cannibal" (Pendulum featuring Wargasm)	Inertia	

==== Promotional singles ====
List of promotional singles
Title	Year	Album	Ref.
"Something Kinda Ooooh" (Amazon Original)	2022	Non-album single	

=== Other appearances ===
Song	Year	Album	Ref.
"Generation Undead" (BaseFace featuring Wargasm)	2020	Generation Undead	
"Molotov" (Ho99o9 featuring Wargasm)	2023	Ho99o9 presents Territory: Turf Talk, Vol. II	
"Hedonist [Recharged]" (Bad Omens featuring Wargasm)	2024	Concrete Jungle[the OST]	
"NeuroGenius" (Pitchshifter featuring Wargasm)	2024	[NOS] Genius Remix EP	

== Tours ==
=== Headlining ===
- War On the Road (2021)
- The Explicit Tour (2022)
- The Venom Tour (2023)

=== Supporting ===
- Yungblud – Occupy the UK Tour (2021; five shows)
- Enter Shikari – USA/Canada Tour (2022; twenty-three shows)
- Limp Bizkit – Still Sucks Tour (2022; twenty-nine shows)
- Bloodywood – Rakshak USA Tour (2023; eighteen shows)
- Corey Taylor – USA Tour (2023; twenty-three shows)
- Babymetal – World Tour (2023; fifteen shows)
- Poppy – Zig Tour (2024; seven shows)

== Awards and accolades ==
Awards and accolades
Publisher	Year	Nominee / work	Award	Result	Ref.
Berlin Music Video Awards	2026	"VIGILANTES"	Best Editor	Nominated	
Heavy Music Awards	2021	Themselves	Best UK Breakthrough Band	Won	
Heavy Music Awards	2022	Themselves	Best Live Artist	Nominated	
Heavy Music Awards	2023	Explicit: The Mixxxtape	Best Breakthrough Album	Nominated	
Heavy Music Awards	2023	"The Void Stares Back" (Enter Shikari ft. Wargasm)	Best Single	Won	
Heavy Music Awards	2024	Venom	Best Breakthrough Album	Nominated	
Kerrang! Awards	2022	Themselves	New Noise Award	Won	
