= Glasnost (album) =

Studio album by Illuminatus (band)
- Released: February 7, 2011
- Recorded: June 2010
- Studio: The Institut für Wohlklangforschung
- Genres: Alternative metal, Heavy metal, Post-Rock, Progressive metal
- Length: 52:00
- Label: Headroom Records
- Producer: Willi Dammeier

Glasnost is the second full-length album by Nottingham alternative metal band illuminatus. The album was released through Headroom Records on February 7, 2011. All songs were written by illuminatus, with all lyrics by Julio Taylor.

== Critical reception ==
Glasnost
Review scores
Source	Rating
DarkScene.at	8.5/10
Metal.de	8/10
PowerMetal.de	9/10

The album was positively reviewed by DarkScene.at, Metal.de, and PowerMetal.de.

== Track listing ==
No.	Title	Length
1.	"Glasnost"	3:10
2.	"Murdocracy"	5:19
3.	"Division"	4:59
4.	"Reconnect"	4:21
5.	"Cave In"	5:58
6.	"Keep Calm and Carry On"	3:12
7.	"You'll Never Know What This Means"	5:23
8.	"Red"	6:40
9.	"Gosling"	2:44
10.	"Clarity"	6:08
11.	"Wolves!"	4:06

== Personnel ==
illuminatus

- Julio Taylor - Vocals / Guitar
- Jon Martin - Guitar
- Felix Rullhusen - Drums
- Leo Giovazzini - Bass
