= The Wrath of the Lambs =

Studio album by Illuminatus (band)
- Released: May 26, 2008
- Recorded: Eskimo Studios, Nottingham & Stuck on a Name Studios, Nottingham
- Genre: Alternative metal, Heavy metal, Post-Rock, Progressive metal
- Length: 45:51
- Label: Anthill Records
- Producer: Matt Kielkopf & Illuminatus (band)

The Wrath of the Lambs is an album by Nottingham alternative metal band illuminatus. The album was released through Anthill Records on May 26, 2008. All songs were written by illuminatus, with all lyrics by Julio Taylor.

== Track listing ==
No.	Title	Length
1.	"Captive State"	4:54
2.	"Wait"	5:20
3.	"Suburban Symmetry"	4:32
4.	"The Wrath of the Lambs"	2:07
5.	"Black"	5:42
6.	"Fear/Control"	4:33
7.	"Emotion Sickness"	6:13
8.	"Wargasm"	4:15
9.	"White Lies"	8:15

== Personnel ==
illuminatus

- Julio Taylor - Vocals / Guitar
- Jon Martin - Guitar
- Felix Rullhusen - Drums
- Mark Freestone - Bass
- Dave Cheeseman - Piano & Keyboards
