= The Golden Age of Not Even Trying =

Studio album by Dead!
- Released: 26 January 2018
- Recorded: 2016–2017
- Studio: Dean St. Studios
- Genre: Punk rock; alternative rock; indie rock
- Length: 40:10
- Label: Infectious Music Ltd., BMG
- Producer: Charlie Russell, Alex Mountford, Sam Matlock

Dead! chronology
Tu Me Manques (2014)	The Golden Age of Not Even Trying (2018)

Singles from The Golden Age of Not Even Trying
- 1. "Enough Enough Enough" Released: 20 March 2017; 2. "Up for Ran$om" Released: 27 July 2017; 3. "You're so Cheap" Released: 16 April 2018

The Golden Age of Not Even Trying is the first and only studio album by the English punk rock band Dead!, released on 26 January 2018 under Infectious Music Ltd. and BMG. It was produced by Charlie Russell and mixed by Thomas Mitchener. The group announced their split on 5 June 2018, cancelling their summer tour dates and announcing that their final show would be their sold-out show on 5 October at The Underworld in London.

Two singles were released to promote the album prior to release, with accompanying music videos: "Enough Enough Enough" and "Up for Ran$om". The band also released a music video for the title track on 6 October 2017. The promotional single "You're so Cheap", a song from the album originally released in 2016, was released on 16 April 2018 along with two B-sides.

== Background ==
After releasing several singles and an EP since 2013, the album was recorded live at Dean St. Studios in London, England.

== Release ==
The album was released on 26 January 2018 and peaked at 11 on the UK's Rock & Metal Albums chart, reached at least 9 on the iTunes UK Rock Albums chart.

The Golden Age of Not Even Trying is the band's only studio album. The group split up in June of 2018 for unknown reasons, posting a brief message thanking their fans, cancelling their summer 2018 tour dates, and announcing their sold-out Underworld show in London as their last. Several members continued their music careers separately. Sam Matlock formed Wargasm with model and photographer Milkie Way after the latter had photographed Dead! performing live, and Louis Matlock began releasing music as Clarence & the Modern Life.

== Critical reception ==
Professional ratings
Review scores
Source	Rating
All Things Loud	9/10
Clash	7/10
Hardbeat	8.5/10
The Music	5/5 stars in a 0–5 star scale
NARC.	4/5 stars in a 0–5 star scale
The Student Playlist	7/10

Clash's Shannon Cotton likened the band to groups like Creeper and Black Foxxes, describing the album as "surfing strands of straight up rock 'n' roll, punchy pop punk and, at times, gripping heavy metal as typically emphatic lyrics weave their way around slicing guitar riffs and bolshy drums". A staff writer at The Music said about the album, "These songs show quite clearly the keen ear these four Brits have for arena-ready choruses and hooks. ...From one listen of this album, it is so clear that Dead! didn't stop working on these songs till they got what they exactly wanted as the effect from these twelve songs is instant and visceral and lasting", and compared it to some of My Chemical Romance's earlier output.

== Track listing ==
All tracks are written by Dead!, with lyrics by Alex Mountford and Sam Matlock.

No.	Title	Length
1.	"The Boys † The Boys"	3:17
2.	"Enough Enough Enough"	3:24
3.	"The Golden Age of Not Even Trying"	2:55
4.	"Jessica"	3:06
5.	"Off White Paint"	3:32
6.	"You're so Cheap"	3:27
7.	"Petrol & Anaesthetic"	2:55
8.	"Up for Ran$om"	3:36
9.	"W9"	3:26
10.	"A Conversation with Concrete"	3:20
11.	"Any Port"	3:13
12.	"Youth Screams & Fades"	3:54
Total length:		40:10

== Personnel ==
Dead!

- Alex Mountford – lead vocals
- Sam Matlock – lead & rhythm guitar
- Louis Matlock – lead & rhythm guitar
- Sam Chappell – bass guitar

Additional musicians

- Stephen North - drums (session musician)

Production

- Charlie Russell – producer
- Thomas Mitchener – mix engineer

== Charts ==
Chart performance for The Golden Age of Not Even Trying
Chart (2018)	Peak position
UK Independent Albums (OCC)	22
UK Rock & Metal Albums (OCC)	11
