= Milkie Way =

Northern-Irish musician (born 1997)

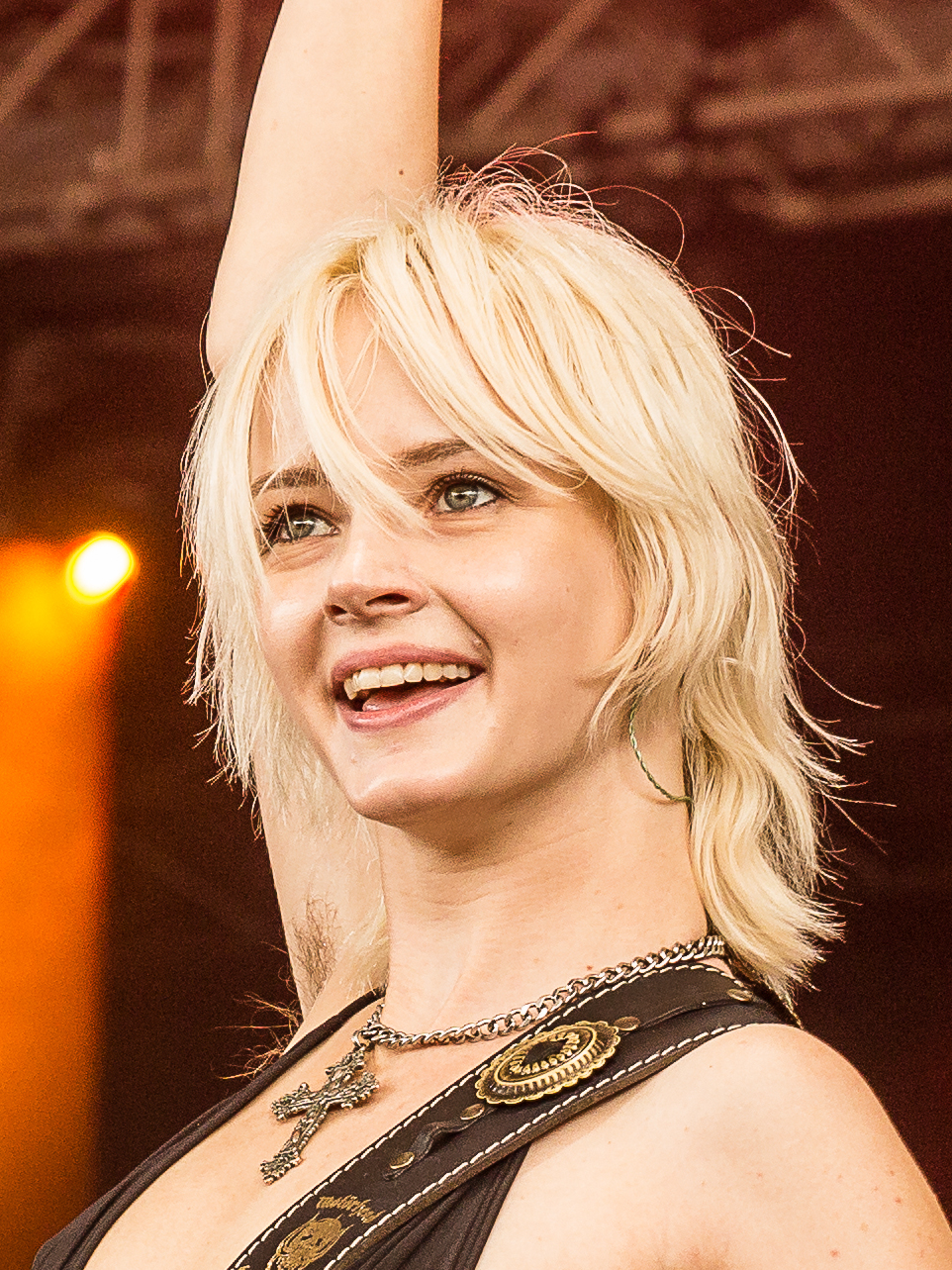
- Hastings performing in 2023

Background information
- Also known as: Milkie Way; Girl in the Pit
- Born: Rachel Alexandra Hastings; 9 December 1997 (age 28); County Antrim, Northern Ireland
- Occupations: Musician; singer
- Instruments: Bass guitar; vocals; guitar
- Member of: Wargasm

Rachel Alexandra Hastings (born 10 December 1997), known professionally as Milkie Way, is a musician and singer from Northern Ireland. Born in County Antrim, she moved to London to study at the London College of Fashion and spent time as a model and a concert photographer. She and Sam Matlock formed Wargasm in August 2019, and their mixtape and album Explicit: The Mixxxtape (2022) and Venom (2023) peaked at number 19 on the UK Rock & Metal Albums Chart and number 88 on the UK Albums Chart respectively.

Hastings also played bass guitar as a session musician for Barns Courtney and Yungblud and featured on Trash Boat's 2021 single "Bad Entertainment" and Gunship's 2023 single "Monster in Paradise". Her performance of "Bad Entertainment" at the 2021 Heavy Music Awards caused its Twitch account to be banned for three days, prompting defiant social media posts from the ceremony, Hastings, and Trash Boat's Tobi Duncan.

== Life and career ==
=== Early life and modelling ===
Milkie Way was born Rachel Alexandra Hastings in County Antrim on 9 December 1997. (Note: For her first and last name, see.; For her middle name, see.; For her birthday, see.; For her birthplace and year, see.) She was raised on Motown, soul music, and pop music such as David Bowie, Stevie Wonder, and the Temptations, got into guitar music via the Smashing Pumpkins and Bikini Kill, and got into nu metal via Tony Hawk's Pro Skater. Aged 14 or 15, she taught herself bass guitar to spite an ex-boyfriend who had derided her musical ambitions. She moved to London to study at London College of Fashion, but dropped out due to her inability to cope with being told what to do. She spent a period modelling in Tokyo immediately after dropping out. She also modelled alongside Cara Delevingne and for Toni & Guy and Valentino campaigns.

=== Girl in the Pit and Wargasm ===
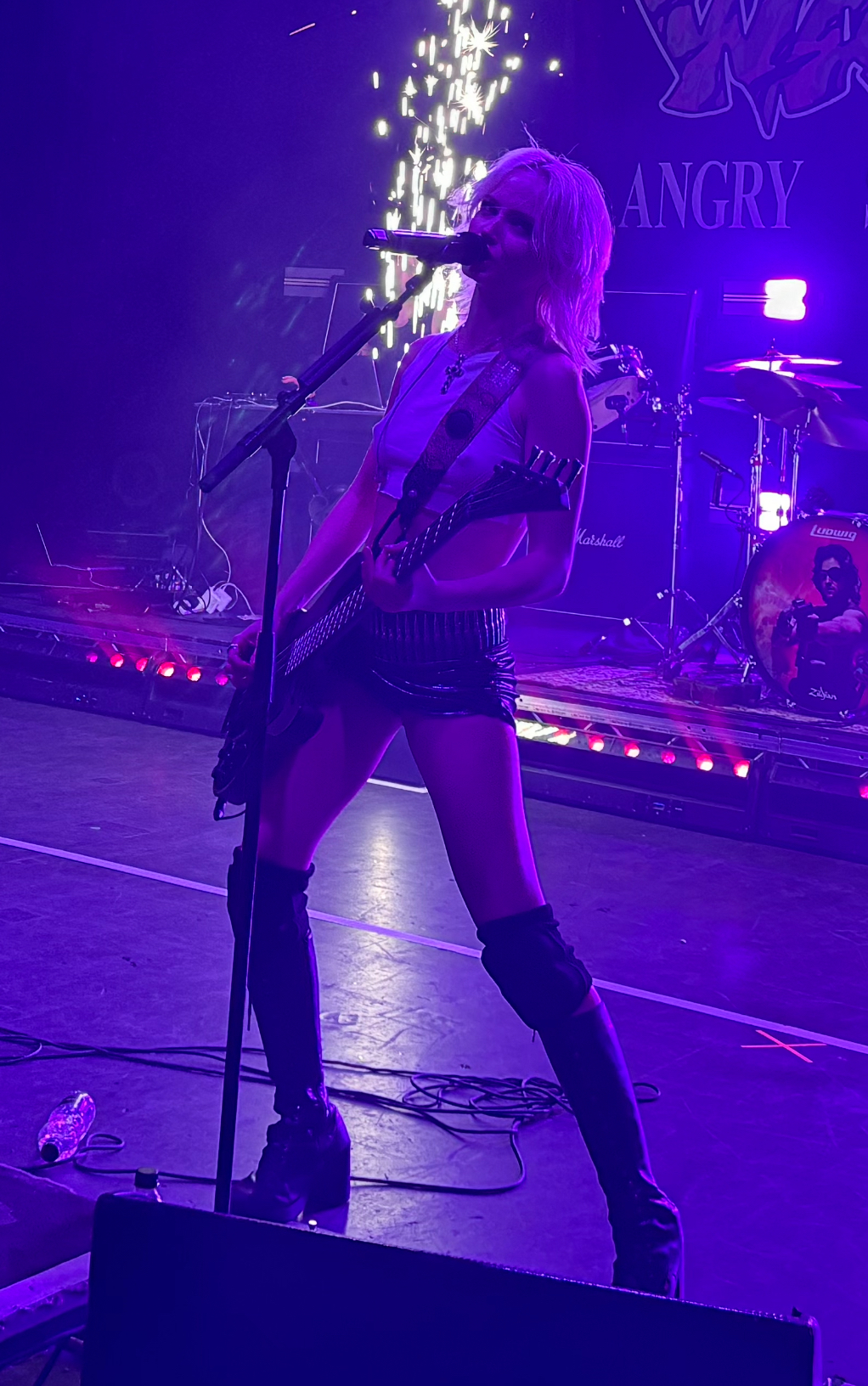
Hastings performing in London as part of Wargasm, 2023

While at university, she would make friends by attending concerts with mosh pits, which she would photograph using disposable cameras. After accruing a collection of images, she launched the "Girl in the Pit" photography project, named after a sobriquet she had earned from her ubiquity at gigs. As part of the project, she photographed Dead!, a band who charted at number 11 on the UK Rock & Metal Albums Chart in 2018 with The Golden Age of Not Even Trying. After being given a press pass to Reading & Leeds Festivals, she also met Barns Courtney, who would take her on tour as his bass player.

In 2018, after Dead! broke up, the band's Sam Matlock direct messaged Hastings asking if she played an instrument, as he was looking to set up a band with female vocals and a Riot grrrl attitude. They began producing pop punk, but pivoted to producing nu metal after an incident in which Matlock rejuvenated a failing party with Limp Bizkit. The pair launched Wargasm in August 2019, and played on Download Festival's Apex Stage in 2022. Wargasm also released the mixtape Explicit: The Mixxxtape (2022) and the album Venom (2023), which respectively charted at number 19 on the UK Rock & Metal Albums Chart and number 88 on the UK Albums Chart.

=== Solo music career ===
In July 2021, Hastings featured on Trash Boat's "Bad Entertainment", a track about media bias from their August 2021 album Don't You Feel Amazing, which charted at number 9 on the UK Rock & Metal Albums Chart and number 70 on the Scottish Albums Chart. Trash Boat and Hastings performed the track at that year's Heavy Music Awards, for which she wore a custom designed crucifix vest created by Anine Irdem, a Norwegian designer. The ceremony's Twitch stream was banned for three days after trolls reported her for exposing her nipples, prompting Hastings to sarcastically tweet that she could not believe how powerful her nipples were. She also received tweets of support from Trash Boat's Tobi Duncan, who observed how hypocritical the ban was given that his nipples were also visible through his fishnet shirt, and from the award ceremony itself. Matlock later attributed the ban to multiple fans of another artist filing reports, and Hastings would later wear the outfit on the artwork for Explicit: The Mixxxtape.

By the time of "Bad Entertainment"'s release, Hastings had toured with Yungblud. She asserted in a September 2021 interview with the Heavy Music Awards that he had previously declined a request for her to be his session bassist as she was just about to announce Wargasm and that she had stepped in for some of his shows at the start of that year. In July 2023, she provided vocals for Gunship's "Monster in Paradise", which also featured Dave Lombardo, Tyler Bates, and Tim Cappello; later that year, the track appeared on their album Unicorn, which charted at number 26 on the UK Albums Chart.

== Artistry ==
Hastings has mentioned how Romily Alice of Japanese Voyeurs and disco music inspired her artistry. Her style icons include Prince, Wendy O. Williams, Paris Hilton, Sora Choi, Tank Girl, 1980s cock rock, Dennis Rodman, Joan Jett, Debbie Harry, Brody Dalle, and Lady Gaga. At the start of January 2021, Yungblud described Way as "a metal Gwen Stefani".

== Discography ==
Year	Title	Album	Ref.
2021	"Bad Entertainment" (Trash Boat featuring Milkie Way)	Don't You Feel Amazing?	
2023	"Monster in Paradise" (Gunship featuring Milkie Way, Dave Lombardo, Tyler Bates, and Tim Cappello)	Unicorn	
