= Cock rock =

Genre of rock music

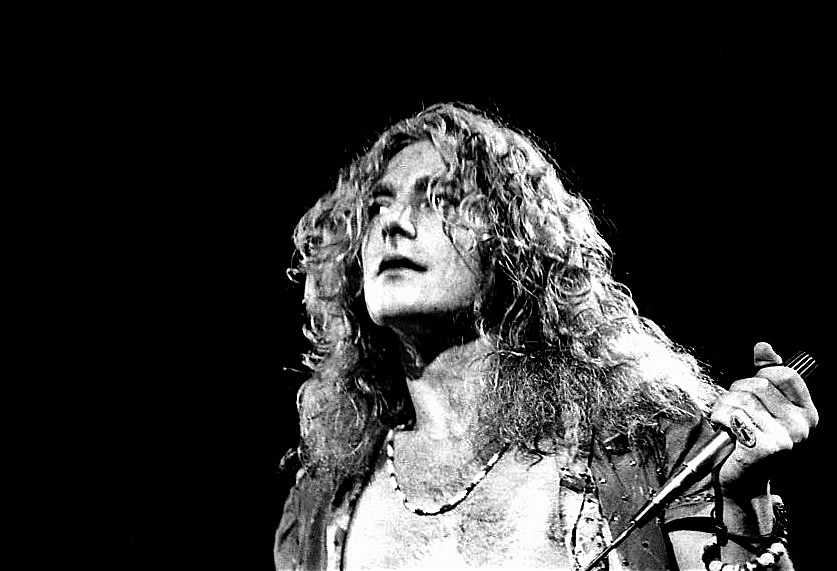
- Robert Plant of Led Zeppelin, considered one of the key acts in the development of cock rock, onstage in New York in 1973.
- Stylistic origins: Rock and roll; hard rock
- Cultural origins: Mid-to late 1960s – early 1970s, United States and United Kingdom

Other topics
- AOR; arena rock; classic rock; rockism; dad rock; glam metal; heavy metal; glam rock; acid rock

Cock rock is a music genre and description of rock music that emphasizes an aggressive form of male sexuality. The style developed in the late 1960s and early 1970s, and continues into the present day.

== Characteristics ==
Cock rock is a musical genre. Philip Auslander uses Simon Frith's description of cock rock characteristics:

[C]ock-rock performance means an explicit, crude, 'masterful' expression of sexuality ... Cock-rock performers are aggressive, boastful, constantly drawing audience attention to their prowess and control. Their bodies are on display ... mikes and guitars are phallic symbols (or else caressed like female bodies), the music is loud, rhythmically insistent, built around techniques of arousal and release. Lyrics are assertive and arrogant, but the exact words are less significant than the vocal styles involved, the shrill shouting and screaming.

== Use of the term ==
The meaning of the term cock rock has changed over time. It was first mentioned by an anonymous author in the New York–based underground feminist publication Rat in 1970 to describe the male-dominated music industry, and became a synonym for hard rock, emphasizing the aggressive expression of male sexuality, often misogynist lyrics and use of phallic imagery. The term was used by sociologists Simon Frith and Angela McRobbie in 1978 to point to the contrast between the male-dominated subculture of cock rock which was "aggressive, dominating and boastful" and the more feminized teenybop stars of pop music. Led Zeppelin have been described as "the quintessential purveyors of 'cock rock'". Other formative acts include the Rolling Stones, the Who and Jim Morrison of the Doors.

In 1981, Frith described the characteristics of cock rock in a way that could apply to female performers, not just male ones. In 2004, Auslander used this description of cock-rock characteristics to suggest that Suzi Quatro (the first female bass player to become a rock star) is a female cock-rocker.

Since the 1980s, the term has been sometimes interchangeable with hair metal or glam metal. Examples of this genre include: Mötley Crüe, Ratt, Warrant, Extreme, Cinderella, Pretty Boy Floyd, Jackyl, L.A. Guns, and Poison. Despite the name, many of these bands had or have large numbers of female fans. The spoof documentary This Is Spinal Tap is an acclaimed parody of the genre. In the 21st century, there was a revival of the genre with the sleaze metal movement in Sweden, with acts including Vains of Jenna.

== See also ==
- Arena rock
- Heavy metal
- Classic rock
- Rockism and poptimism
