= Sam Matlock =

British musician

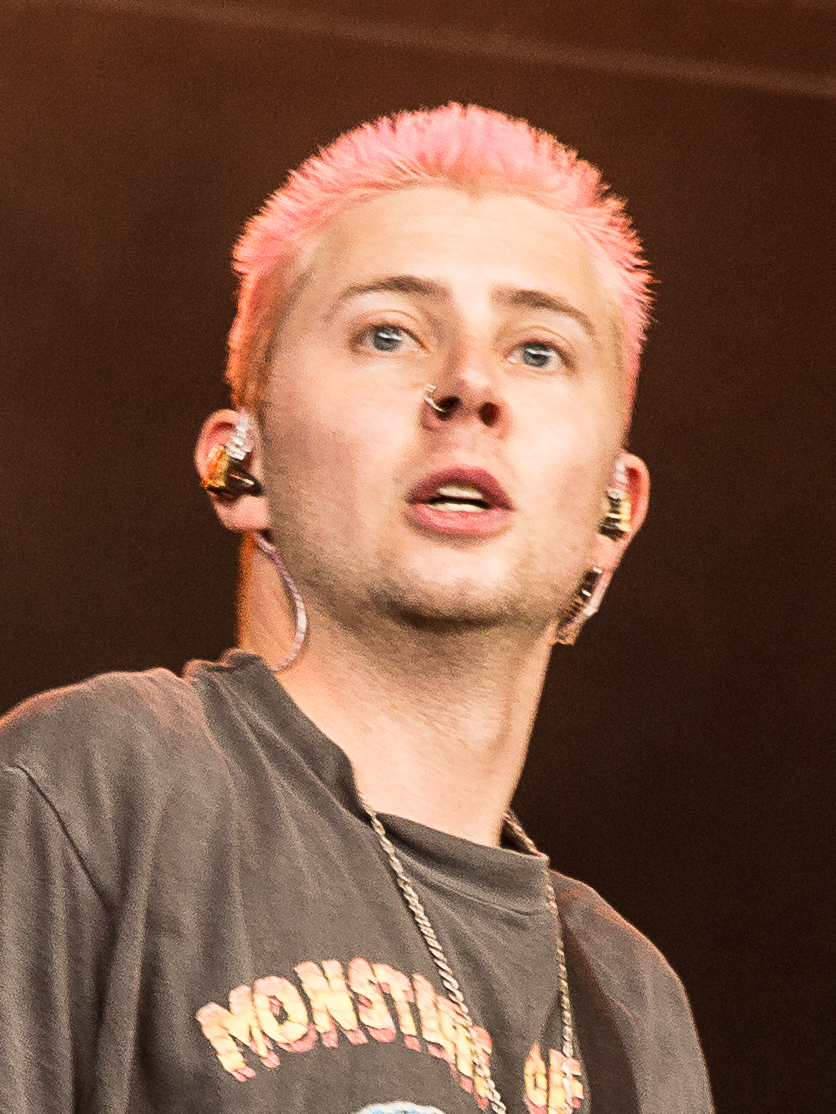
- Matlock performing at Full Force in 2023

Background information
- Born: Sam James Matlock; 16 March 1993 (age 33)
- Occupations: Guitarist; singer
- Instruments: Guitar; vocals
- Years active: 2012–present
- Member of: Wargasm
- Formerly of: Dead!

Sam James Matlock (born 16 March 1993) is an English guitarist and singer. He formed the rock band Dead! in 2012 and entered the UK Rock & Metal Albums Chart with that band's The Golden Age of Not Even Trying in 2018; after they split up, he recruited musician Milkie Way for his own band named Wargasm, which launched in August 2019 and entered the UK Albums Chart in 2023 with Venom. He has also co-written the Bambie Thug song "Doomsday Blue" and played live with Jamie Lenman. In November 2021, he attracted press attention after being assaulted at Scala by security guards, who were subsequently fired.

== Life and career ==
Sam James Matlock was born on 16 March 1993 and is the son of a music publicist and Glen Matlock, the bassist for the Sex Pistols. He and his brother Louis both attended Ryde School and Southampton Solent University. Sam discovered guitar music when he listened to Nirvana and formed Dead! with Louis, Sam Chappell, and Alex Mountford while at university. The band signed to Infectious Records in May 2016 and had moved to London by the following year. They released the 2018 album The Golden Age of Not Even Trying, which charted at No. 11 on the UK Rock & Metal Albums Chart, before announcing that they would split up following a gig in October 2018.

Straight after Dead!'s dissolution, Matlock direct messaged the band's photographer Milkie Way. At the time, he was working behind a bar and was looking to form a project with a riot grrrl attitude and female vocals; this became Wargasm, who launched in August 2019. They began producing pop punk but soon pivoted to nu metal. During the COVID-19 lockdown, both moved in with Way's parents. In May 2021, Matlock joined Jamie Lenman for his Separation Event livestream, a live playing of his pandemic King of Clubs mini-album, deputising for PENGSHUi's Illaman on "Summer of Discontent".

Two days after performing a Wargasm gig at Scala at their Face Down club night on 5 November 2021, Matlock uploaded to social media a picture of large red marks he had sustained to his back and arms. In his post, he alleged that three security guards had verbally abused Wargasm's female tour manager and had responded to him challenging them by dragging him into a toilet, bashing his head against a toilet seat, and holding his head in a toilet bowl. He also stated that he only escaped after another member of his touring party intervened, that they had been attempting to contact the venue over the weekend regarding the matter, and that said bouncers' continued employment meant that they did not consider the club a safe venue, especially for women. The Security Industry Authority confirmed that they had received a complaint. After investigating, Scala fired two of the bouncers involved, with Wargasm later posting to social media that the third had also been fired. A week and a half after the incident, the venue set out a number of planned security measures for its subsequent performances.

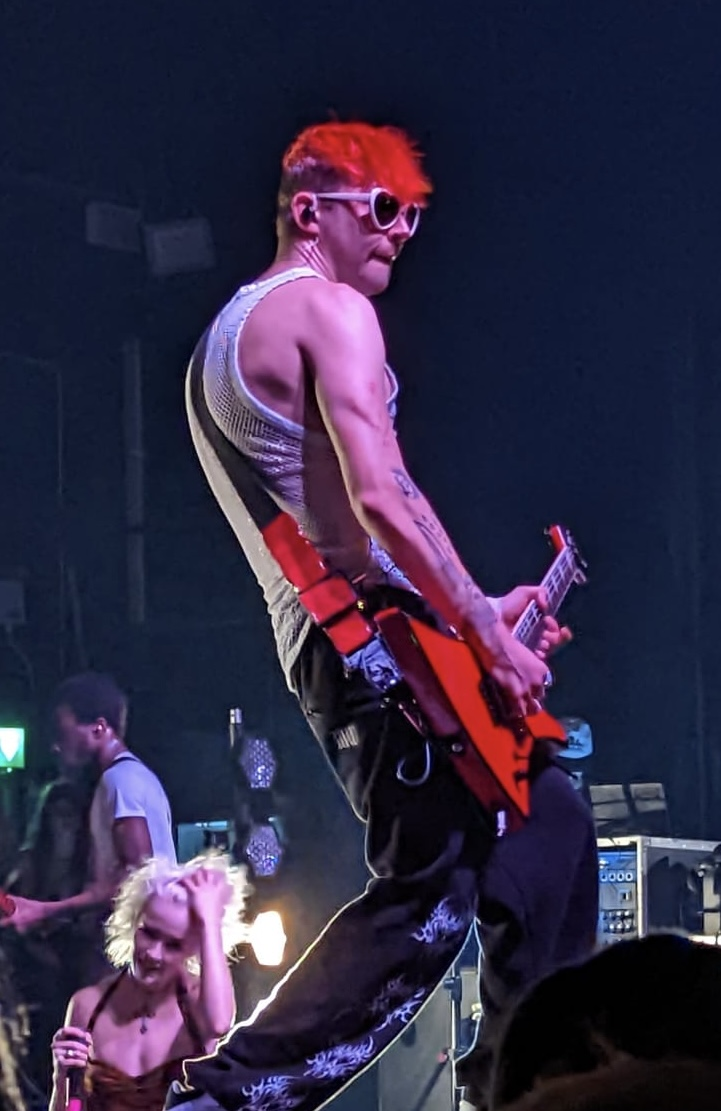
Matlock performing as part of Wargasm in 2022

Wargasm released the mixtape Explicit: The Mixxxtape (2022) and the album Venom (2023), which respectively charted at number 19 on the UK Rock & Metal Albums Chart and number 88 on the UK Albums Chart. One track from Venom, "Bang Ya Head", was written about Matlock's experiences working behind a bar. In July 2024, he featured on Crashface's "Maniac", a track about the extracurricular requirements of musicians, which later appeared on their third EP Life and Death in the Wasteland. Between October 2023 and August 2024, Matlock co-wrote Harpy's "Inside Out", Bambie Thug's "Doomsday Blue", and Bex's "Taste Better".

== Discography ==
=== Featured singles ===
- "Smells Like Teen Spirit" (2022, with Hyper & Jack Trammell)
- "Maniac" (2024, with Crashface)

=== Other songs ===
- "Summer of Discontent" (2021, as part of Jamie Lenman's Separation Event - Live)
