= Lower Than Atlantis discography =

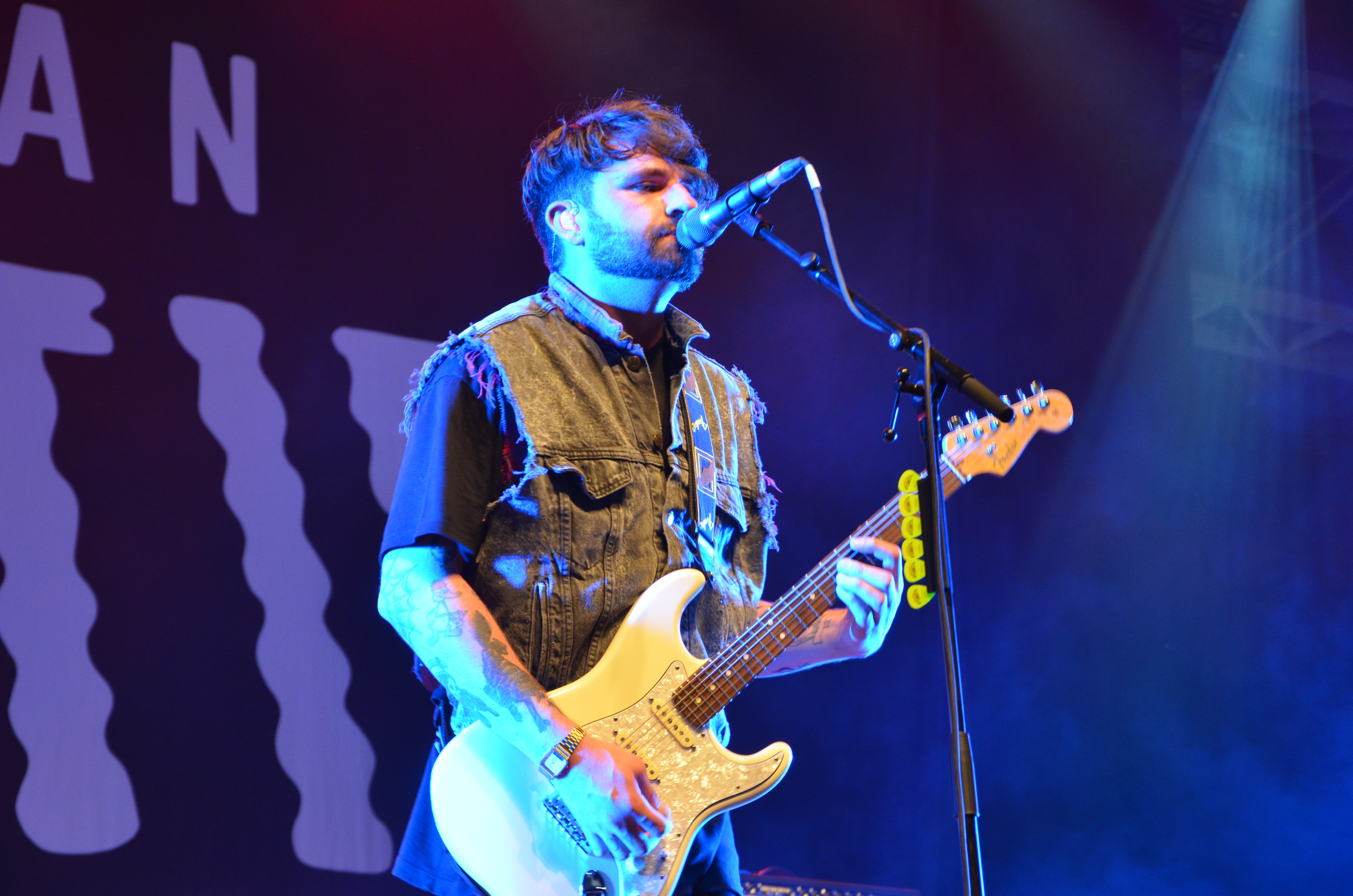
- Lower Than Atlantis at Rock am Ring, 2015
- Studio albums: 5
- EPs: 4
- Compilation albums: 1
- Singles: 13
- Music videos: 17

The discography of Lower Than Atlantis, an English rock band, consists of five studio albums, one compilation album, four EPs and 13 singles.

== Studio albums ==
List of studio albums
Title	Album details	Peak chart positions
Title	Album details	UK
Far Q	Released: 29 March 2010; Label: A Wolf at Your Door (WYD021); Format: CD, DL, LP	—
World Record	Released: 25 April 2011; Label: A Wolf at Your Door (WYD025); Format: CD, DL	—
Changing Tune	Released: 1 October 2012; Label: Island (3707795); Format: CD, CD+DVD-V, DL, LP	25
Lower Than Atlantis	Released: 6 October 2014; Label: Sony Music Entertainment (88843090452); Format: CD, DL, LP	16
Safe in Sound	Released: 3 February 2017; Label: Easy Life, Red Essential (ELIFE 001); Format: CD, CS, DL, LP	8

== Compilation albums ==
List of compilation albums
Title	Album details
Demos, B-Sides & Rarities	Released: 25 January 2017; Label: Kerrang!; Format: CD

== Extended plays ==
List of extended plays
Title	Album details	Peak chart positions
Title	Album details	UK
Demo 2007	Released: 2007; Label: Self-released; Format: CD, DL	—
Bretton (Note: The EP was reissued through Thirty Days of Night on 19 December 2008.)	Released: 18 October 2008; Label: Small Talk; Format: CD, DL	—
Punk on the Covers	Released: 13 April 2010; Label: Self-released; Format: CD, DL	—
Emily	Released: 3 October 2014; Label: Sony Music Entertainment; Format: DL	151

== Singles ==
List of singles, showing year released and album name
Title	Year	Peak chart positions	Album
Title	Year	UK	Album
"Taping Songs Off the Radio"	2010	—	Far Q
"Far Q"	2010	—	Far Q
"Beech Like the Tree"	2011	—	World Record
"Deadliest Catch"	2011	—	World Record
"(Motor) Way of Life"	2011	—	World Record
"If the World Was to End"	2012	—	Non-album single
"Love Someone Else"	2012	184	Changing Tune
"Merry Christmas (Wherever You Are)"	2012	—	Non-album single
"Go on Strike"	2013	—	Changing Tune
"Something Better Came Along"	2013	—	Changing Tune
"Here We Go"	2014	86	Lower Than Atlantis
"English Kids in America"	2014	—	Lower Than Atlantis
"Emily"/"English Kids in America"	2014	—	Lower Than Atlantis
"Words Don't Come So Easily"	2015	—	Lower Than Atlantis
"Get Over It"	2015	181	Lower Than Atlantis
"Work for It"	2016	—	Safe in Sound
"Boomerang"	2017	—	Safe in Sound
"—" denotes releases that did not chart.

== Original compilation appearances ==
List of original multi-artist compilation appearances, with contribution, showing year released and album name
Title	Album details	Contribution
Worship and Tributes	Released: 29 April 2015; Label: Rock Sound (RSUKCD200); Format: CD, DL	"Everything Is Alright" (Motion City Soundtrack cover)
Maiden Heaven: Volume Two	Released: 8 June 2016; Label: Kerrang!; Format: CD	"The Number of the Beast" (Iron Maiden cover)

== Videography ==
List of music videos, showing year released and director
Title	Year	Director
"The Juggernaut"	2009	Daniel Seecharan
"Taping Songs Off the Radio"	2010	Stuart Birchall
"Far Q"	2010	
"Beech Like the Tree"	2011	
"Deadliest Catch"	2011	
"(Motor) Way of Life"	2011	Alex Gregory
"If the World Was to End"	2012	
"Love Someone Else"	2012	Luke Bellis
"Merry Christmas (Wherever You Are)"	2012	
"Go on Strike"	2013	Luke Bellis
"Something Better Came Along"	2013	Daniel Broadley
"Here We Go"	2014	Daniel Broadley
"English Kids in America"	2014	Daniel Broadley
"Emily"	2014	Barney Dick
"Criminal"	2014	Jordan Green
"Words Don't Come So Easily"	2015	LOVE V/A
"Get Over It"	2015	Andrew Groves

== See also ==
- List of songs recorded by Lower Than Atlantis
