= List of songs recorded by Lower Than Atlantis =

The following is a sortable table of all songs by Lower Than Atlantis:

- The column Song list the song title.
- The column Writer(s) lists who wrote the song.
- The column Album lists the album the song is featured on.
- The column Producer lists the producer of the song.
- The column Year lists the year in which the song was released.
- The column Length list the length/duration of the song.

== Studio recordings ==
Song	Writer(s)	Album	Producer	Year	Length
"(Motor) Way of Life"	Lower Than Atlantis, Mike Duce	World Record	—	2011	3:05
"A/S/L?"	Lower Than Atlantis, Mike Duce	Far Q	Daniel Lancaster	2010	2:39
"A Thousand Miles" (Vanessa Carlton cover)^{[E]}	Vanessa Carlton	Lower Than Atlantis	—	2015	4:12
"Ain't No Friend"	Mike Duce, Declan Hart, Daniel Lancaster, Ben Sansom, Eddy Thrower	Lower Than Atlantis	Daniel Lancaster	2014	3:55
"Ain't No Friend" (alternative version)^{[D]}	Mike Duce, Declan Hart, Daniel Lancaster, Ben Sansom, Eddy Thrower	Lower Than Atlantis	Daniel Lancaster	2014	3:32
"Am I Wrong?" (Nico & Vinz cover)^{[E]}	William Wiik Larsen, Nico Sereba, Vincent Dery	Lower Than Atlantis	—	2015	4:08
"Another Sad Song"	Lower Than Atlantis, Mike Duce	World Record	—	2011	4:31
"Another Sad Song" (acoustic)^{[C]}	Lower Than Atlantis, Mike Duce	—	—	2013	3:24
"B.O.R.E.D"	Lower Than Atlantis, Mike Duce	Far Q	Daniel Lancaster	2010	1:50
"Beech Like the Tree"	Lower Than Atlantis, Mike Duce	World Record	—	2011	2:18
"Beside Myself"^{[A]}	Lower Than Atlantis, Mike Duce	"Deadliest Catch"	—	2011	4:07
"Bretton"	—	Demo 2007 (EP)	—	2007	2:34
"Bretton"	Lower Than Atlantis, Mike Duce, Luke Sansom	Bretton (EP)	Matt Tuck	2008	2:40
"Bug"	Lower Than Atlantis, Mike Duce	World Record	—	2011	1:46
"Cool Kids"	Lower Than Atlantis, Mike Duce	Changing Tune	John Mitchell, Ben Humphreys	2012	3:27
"Could You? Would You?"	Lower Than Atlantis, Mike Duce	World Record	—	2011	3:46
"Counting Sheep"^{[B]}	Lower Than Atlantis, Mike Duce	Changing Tune	John Mitchell, Ben Humphreys	2012	2:59
"Criminal"	Mike Duce, Declan Hart, Daniel Lancaster, Stephen Robson, Ben Sansom, Eddy Thrower	Lower Than Atlantis	Daniel Lancaster	2014	2:57
"Damn Nation"	Mike Duce, Declan Hart, Daniel Lancaster, Ben Sansom, Eddy Thrower	Lower Than Atlantis	Daniel Lancaster	2014	3:37
"Deadliest Catch"	Lower Than Atlantis, Mike Duce	World Record	—	2011	3:40
"Down with the Kids"	Lower Than Atlantis, Mike Duce	Far Q	Daniel Lancaster	2010	3:48
"Eating Is Cheating"	Lower Than Atlantis, Mike Duce	Far Q	Daniel Lancaster	2010	3:22
"Emily"	George Astasio, Mike Duce, Declan Hart, Daniel Lancaster, Jason Pebworth, Ben Sansom, Jonathan Shave, Eddy Thrower	Lower Than Atlantis	Daniel Lancaster	2014	3:30
"English Kids in America"	Mike Duce, Declan Hart, Daniel Lancaster, Ben Sansom, Eddy Thrower	Lower Than Atlantis	Daniel Lancaster	2014	3:23
"English Kids in America" (alternative version)^{[D]}	Mike Duce, Declan Hart, Daniel Lancaster, Ben Sansom, Eddy Thrower	Lower Than Atlantis	Daniel Lancaster	2014	4:29
"Everlong" (Foo Fighters cover)	Dave Grohl	Punk on the Covers (EP)	—	2010	4:40
"Every Little Thing She Does Is Magic" (The Police cover)	Hugh Padgham, Stewart Copeland, Sting, Andy Summers	Punk on the Covers (EP)	—	2010	3:35
"Everybody Wants to Rule the World" (Tears for Fears cover)^{[E]}	Roland Orzabal, Ian Stanley, Chris Hughes	Lower Than Atlantis	—	2015	4:02
"Everything Is Alright" (Motion City Soundtrack cover)	Justin Pierre	Worship and Tributes	—	2015	3:31
"EXTRA! EXTRA! Read All About It!"	Lower Than Atlantis, Mike Duce	Far Q	Daniel Lancaster	2010	3:30
"Face Full of Scars"	Lower Than Atlantis, Mike Duce	Far Q	Daniel Lancaster	2010	3:24
"Far Q"	Lower Than Atlantis, Mike Duce	Far Q	Daniel Lancaster	2010	4:12
"Frankie Goes to Hemel"	Lower Than Atlantis, Mike Duce, Luke Sansom	Bretton (EP)	Matt Tuck	2008	2:56
"Get Over It"^{[E]}	Mike Duce, Daniel Lancaster	Lower Than Atlantis	—	2015	3:40
"Go on Strike"	Lower Than Atlantis, Mike Duce	Changing Tune	John Mitchell, Ben Humphreys	2012	2:52
"Go on Strike" (acoustic)^{[C]}	Lower Than Atlantis, Mike Duce	—	—	2013	2:48
"Grounded"^{[A]}	Lower Than Atlantis, Mike Duce	"Beech Like the Tree"	—	2011	2:36
"Here We Go"	Mike Duce, Declan Hart, Daniel Lancaster, Ben Sansom, Eddy Thrower	Lower Than Atlantis	Daniel Lancaster	2014	3:43
"Here We Go" (alternative version)^{[D]}	Mike Duce, Declan Hart, Daniel Lancaster, Ben Sansom, Eddy Thrower	Lower Than Atlantis	Daniel Lancaster	2014	2:43
"High at Five"	Lower Than Atlantis, Mike Duce	World Record	—	2011	3:59
"I Hate Comic Sans"	Lower Than Atlantis, Mike Duce, Luke Sansom	Bretton (EP)	Matt Tuck	2008	0:24
"I Know a Song That Will Get on Your Nerves"	Lower Than Atlantis, Mike Duce	Changing Tune	John Mitchell, Ben Humphreys	2012	2:43
"I'm Not Bulimic (I Just Wanted to See How Far I Could Stick My Fingers Down My Throat)"	Lower Than Atlantis, Mike Duce	Far Q	Daniel Lancaster	2010	4:48
"I'm Partying"^{[D]}	—	Lower Than Atlantis	Daniel Lancaster	2014	2:54
"If the World Was to End"^{[B]}	Lower Than Atlantis, Mike Duce	"If the World Was to End"	John Mitchell	2012	3:53
"Just What You Need"	George Astasio, Mike Duce, Declan Hart, Daniel Lancaster, Jason Pebworth, Ben Sansom, Jonathan Shave, Eddy Thrower	Lower Than Atlantis	Daniel Lancaster	2014	2:40
"Live by the Remote, Die by the Remote"^{[A]}	Lower Than Atlantis, Mike Duce	"(Motor) Way of Life"	—	2011	3:50
"Live Slow, Die Old"	—	Lower Than Atlantis	Daniel Lancaster	2014	3:34
"Love Someone Else"	Lower Than Atlantis, Mike Duce	Changing Tune	John Mitchell, Ben Humphreys	2012	2:30
"Love Someone Else" (acoustic)^{[C]}	Lower Than Atlantis, Mike Duce	—	—	2013	2:27
"March of the LTA"	Lower Than Atlantis, Mike Duce, Luke Sansom	Bretton (EP)	Matt Tuck	2008	2:40
"Marilyn's Mansion"	Lower Than Atlantis, Mike Duce	World Record	—	2011	1:34
"Merry Christmas (Wherever You Are)"	—	"Merry Christmas (Wherever You Are)"	—	2012	3:09
"Message in a Bottle" (The Police cover)^{[C]}	Sting	—	—	2013	3:53
"Mike Duce's Symphony No.11 in D Minor"	Lower Than Atlantis, Mike Duce	Far Q	Daniel Lancaster	2010	3:09
"Move Along"	Lower Than Atlantis, Mike Duce	Changing Tune	John Mitchell, Ben Humphreys	2012	2:58
"Never Meant" (American Football cover)	American Football	Punk on the Covers (EP)	—	2010	3:57
"No Belts"	Lower Than Atlantis, Mike Duce	Far Q	Daniel Lancaster	2010	3:37
"Normally Strange"	Lower Than Atlantis, Mike Duce	Changing Tune	John Mitchell, Ben Humphreys	2012	3:26
"Number One"	—	Lower Than Atlantis	Daniel Lancaster	2014	3:26
"Penny for the Guy"	—	Demo 2007 (EP)	—	2007	4:19
"PMA"	Lower Than Atlantis, Mike Duce	Changing Tune	John Mitchell, Ben Humphreys	2012	2:28
"Powerhouse" (early version of "Sleeping in the Bath")	—	Demo 2007 (EP)	—	2007	3:12
"Prologue"	Lower Than Atlantis, Mike Duce	Changing Tune	John Mitchell, Ben Humphreys	2012	2:48
"R.O.I."	Lower Than Atlantis, Mike Duce	World Record	—	2011	2:51
"Real Love" (Clean Bandit cover)^{[E]}	Richard Boardman, Robert Harvey, Cleo Tighe, Sarah Blanchard, Jessica Glynne, Janée Bennett, Jack Patterson, Grace Chatto	Lower Than Atlantis	—	2015	3:41
"Scared of the Dark"	Lower Than Atlantis, Mike Duce	Changing Tune	John Mitchell, Ben Humphreys	2012	4:21
"Sewer Side"^{[D]}	—	Lower Than Atlantis	Daniel Lancaster	2014	2:43
"Short Way Home"^{[B]}	Lower Than Atlantis, Mike Duce	Changing Tune	John Mitchell, Ben Humphreys	2012	2:49
"Showtime"	Lower Than Atlantis, Mike Duce	Changing Tune	John Mitchell, Ben Humphreys	2012	3:23
"Sleeping in the Bath"	Lower Than Atlantis, Mike Duce, Luke Sansom	Bretton (EP)	Matt Tuck	2008	3:11
"Something Better Came Along"	Lower Than Atlantis, Mike Duce	Changing Tune	John Mitchell, Ben Humphreys	2012	3:58
"Soul Doubt"^{[B]}	Lower Than Atlantis, Mike Duce	Changing Tune	John Mitchell, Ben Humphreys	2012	3:58
"Stays the Same"	Mike Duce, Declan Hart, Daniel Lancaster, Ben Sansom, Eddy Thrower	Lower Than Atlantis	Daniel Lancaster	2014	3:40
"Strong" (Robbie Williams cover)^{[E]}	Robbie Williams, Guy Chambers	Lower Than Atlantis	—	2015	4:18
"Super Hero"^{[D]}	—	Lower Than Atlantis	Daniel Lancaster	2014	2:28
"Taping Songs Off the Radio"	Lower Than Atlantis, Mike Duce	Far Q	Daniel Lancaster	2010	2:50
"That's What You Get" (Paramore cover)	Hayley Williams, Josh Farro, Taylor York	Punk on the Covers (EP)	—	2010	3:32
"The Juggernaut"	Lower Than Atlantis, Mike Duce, Luke Sansom	Bretton (EP)	Matt Tuck	2008	3:14
"The Reason"^{[E]}	—	Lower Than Atlantis	—	2015	3:39
"Third Degree Montgomery Burns"	—	Demo 2007 (EP)	—	2007	4:00
"Time"	Mike Duce, Julian Emery, Declan Hart, Jim Irvin, Daniel Lancaster, Ben Sansom, Eddy Thrower	Lower Than Atlantis	Daniel Lancaster	2014	3:45
"Time Flies"^{[B]}	Lower Than Atlantis, Mike Duce	Changing Tune	John Mitchell, Ben Humphreys	2012	3:43
"Uni 9MM"	Lower Than Atlantis, Mike Duce	World Record	—	2011	3:19
"Up in Smoke"	Lower Than Atlantis, Mike Duce	World Record	—	2011	3:04
"Vampires Suck, Blood"	Lower Than Atlantis, Mike Duce, Luke Sansom	Bretton (EP)	Matt Tuck	2008	3:25
"Wars with Words"	Lower Than Atlantis, Mike Duce	Changing Tune	John Mitchell, Ben Humphreys	2012	1:49
"What a Beautiful Day to Impersonate an Officer"	Lower Than Atlantis, Mike Duce, Luke Sansom	Bretton (EP)	Matt Tuck	2008	2:56
"Wish You Were Here" (Incubus cover)^{[E]}	Brandon Boyd, Mike Einziger, Alex Katunich, Chris Kilmore, José Pasillas	Lower Than Atlantis	—	2015	3:36
"Words Don't Come So Easily"	George Astasio, Mike Duce, Declan Hart, Daniel Lancaster, Jason Pebworth, Ben Sansom, Jonathan Shave, Eddy Thrower	Lower Than Atlantis	Daniel Lancaster	2014	3:18
"Words Don't Come So Easily" (alternative version)^{[D]}	George Astasio, Mike Duce, Declan Hart, Daniel Lancaster, Jason Pebworth, Ben Sansom, Jonathan Shave, Eddy Thrower	Lower Than Atlantis	Daniel Lancaster	2014	3:06
"Work for It"	Lower Than Atlantis, Mike Duce	Work for It - Single	Daniel Lancaster	2016	3:18
"Working for the Man by Day, Stickin' It to the Man by Night"	Lower Than Atlantis, Mike Duce	World Record	—	2011	3:09
"Yo Music Scene, What Happened?"	Lower Than Atlantis, Mike Duce	Far Q	Daniel Lancaster	2010	3:19

== See also ==
- Lower Than Atlantis discography
