= Safe in Sound (Lower Than Atlantis album) =

Studio album by Lower Than Atlantis
- Released: 3 February 2017
- Recorded: Late 2015, July–August 2016
- Studio: Various: The Pool, Miloco Studios, London; Titan Studios, Watford; Daniel Lancaster's house, Watford; Mike Duce's flat, Watford
- Genre: Hard rock
- Length: 34:25
- Label: Easy Life, Red Essential
- Producer: Dan Lancaster

Lower Than Atlantis chronology
Lower Than Atlantis (2014)	Safe in Sound (2017)

Singles from Safe in Sound
- 1. "Work for It" Released: 17 August 2016; 2. "Had Enough" Released: 30 November 2016; 3. "Boomerang" Released: 20 January 2017

Safe in Sound is the fifth and final studio album by British rock band Lower Than Atlantis. The album released on 3 February 2017. Following the release of Changing Tune (2012), Island Records were streamlining and dropping artists who were underselling. Despite the album underselling, the group couldn't be dropped as the label had picked the option for their next album. The label offered the band the chance to take an advance and leave, which they subsequently did to build a personal studio. Here, the group worked on their next album, Lower Than Atlantis, which was released through Sony Music and supported by successful tours. In early 2015, the band were having discussions with Sony about their next album.

Drum tracks were recorded in late 2015 at The Pool at Miloco Studios in London with producer Dan Lancaster. Following a six-month break, which began from December 2015, the band were recording in their own studio in July–August 2016. All of the guitar and bass parts were recorded in their personal studio, and vocals were recorded at Lancaster's house and vocalist/guitarist Mike Duce's flat. Mixes were done while the band was on a European tour. The majority of the songs were co-written between Duce and one of three songwriters: Julian Emery, Lancaster or Dan McDougall.

"Work for It" was released as a single in August 2016, a music video for the song followed a month later. In October, Safe in Sound was announced for release, and a music video was released for "Dumb". In November, the group supported You Me at Six in Europe, and a music video was released for the second single "Had Enough". In January 2017, "Boomerang" was made available for streaming, and in the following month, Safe in Sound was released through Easy Life Records and Red Essential.

== Background ==
Lower Than Atlantis released their third album Changing Tune in October 2012 through Island Records. Sometime afterwards, the label was in the process of streamlining and dropping artists that were underselling. Despite the album reaching the top 30, it undersold the label's expectations. The band, however, couldn't be dropped due to the label having already picked the option for their next album. The label gave the band the choice to either release the next album through them but with no marketing, or take an advance and leave the label. The band subsequently took the advance and built their own recording studio. The band spent the following couple of years working on the studio and their next album.

After signing with Sony Music in 2014, the group released their self-titled album in October of the same year, charting in the top 20 in the UK. The album's lead single, "Here We Go", went on to sell over 50,000 copies worldwide. The album was supported by two sold-out tours of the UK, as well as a support slots for A Day to Remember on their UK tour, and Hands Like Houses in Australia and the US. In May 2015, guitarist Ben Sansom revealed the group were having discussions with Sony Music about their next album: "Everyone seems excited for what['s] next."

== Production ==
All of the drum tracks had been recorded at The Pool at Miloco Studios in London, over the course of three weekends in late 2015. The drums were recorded here due to the band's personal studio consisting solely of a control room, a live room, and storage for their equipment. Duce said their studio was "great for close mic stuff but not so good for big room drums." Vocal overdubs and stomps were also recorded. Dan Lancaster produced the sessions here, with assistance from Sam Harper and Jamie McEvoy. Lancaster also engineered the drums, with additional drum engineering by Darren Jones. Jones mentioned that the group originally planned to record a few songs but "liked the sound so much they decided to do the [drum tracks for] whole album". Following the end of a UK tour in December 2015, the band members went on a six-month break to spend time with family. According to Duce, the group spent a period of time "refining our sound as well as trying some new techniques."

In July 2016, Rock Sound reported that the band was in the process of recording. Recording took place at the band's personal studio, Titan Studios in Watford. Here, the band recorded all of the guitar and bass parts, which were engineered by Sansom. Most of the guitar tracks were recorded clean, and re-amped later on. Duce described the recording process as: "Me, Ben and Dan sitting in our studio running through things in a pretty leisurely way." The songs were recorded in batches of two at a time, according to Duce, "like a production line". This allowed the band to concentrate their efforts and "make them sound as good as possible."

Vocals were recorded at Lancaster's house and Duce's flat, which were engineered by Lancaster. Duce reasoned that vocals were recorded at Lancaster's house "because he couldn't be bothered to come to ours." By mid-August, Duce said the group were "about seven songs in," and were planning on having 10 songs completed. Duce explained that if albums had less than 12 songs, they would need to be "stonking belters ... The seven that we've got now are those kind of songs." The deadline for album was during a European tour with You Me at Six, during which, the band were listening to mixes done by Lancaster. Duce explained: "We were listening to mixes on the bus, doing mix points and sending them back. It was mental, but we got it done in the end." Dick Beetham mastered the recordings at 360 Mastering.

== Composition ==
Duce explained the album's name was taken from "the idea of being 'safe and sound' but being safe within music." The album's themes delve into "depression, rejection, being in love and monetary worries to name a few", according to Duce. While the group's self-titled effort was a mixture of "some bangin’ LTA songs, some rock bangers ... stuff I’d written with boybands in mind," Duce intended Safe in Sound to be "100 per cent [LTA]." Most of the songs were written between Duce and an additional writer: "Had Enough" with Julian Emery and Lancaster, "Dumb", "Long Time Coming" and "Work for It" with Lancaster, "Long Time Coming", "Could Be Worse", "I Would" and "A Night to Forget" with Dan McDougall, "Boomerang" with James Bay and Jonathan Green. Additionally, "Had Enough", "Long Time Coming", "Boomerang" and "A Night to Forget" were also co-written with the rest of the band. The album's sound has been described as hard rock.

Duce was "having a shit day and couldn’t be bothered to [record a] vocal [for] an instrumental [track] I had," which resulted in the creation of "Had Enough". According to Thrower, the song "distils everything that we’re about." Duce mentioned that it was the first track written for the album. With "Boomerang", the group wanted to, according to Duce, "do a pop track and see what comes out." Discussing "Work for It", Duce explained that you "either have a choice to sit on your arse and hope things come your way or get up, get to work and put in the effort and perseverance." The song was initially inspired by Duce's brother and sister receiving their GCSE results, "but it morphed into a song about me sorting my life out and focusing on my career in music." Duce wrote "Could Be Worse" for himself "because things could always be worse."

Duce considered "Could Be Worse" and "I Would" to be reminiscent of their second album, World Record (2011), in the sense that they feature "the best bits of our band, and then a couple of new things." According to Duce, the intro to "Money" was influenced by the music featured in the TV series Stranger Things. Referring to "I Don't Want to Be Here Anymore", Duce said "depressing, sad songs ... just come out. It's like therapy... something to take my mind off things." According to Duce, the song had been written three years prior. With "A Night to Forget", Duce explained that the group were playing festivals where people would be "pissed with their mates, jumping up and down and having a laugh – and it didn't feel like we had a song for that."

== Release ==
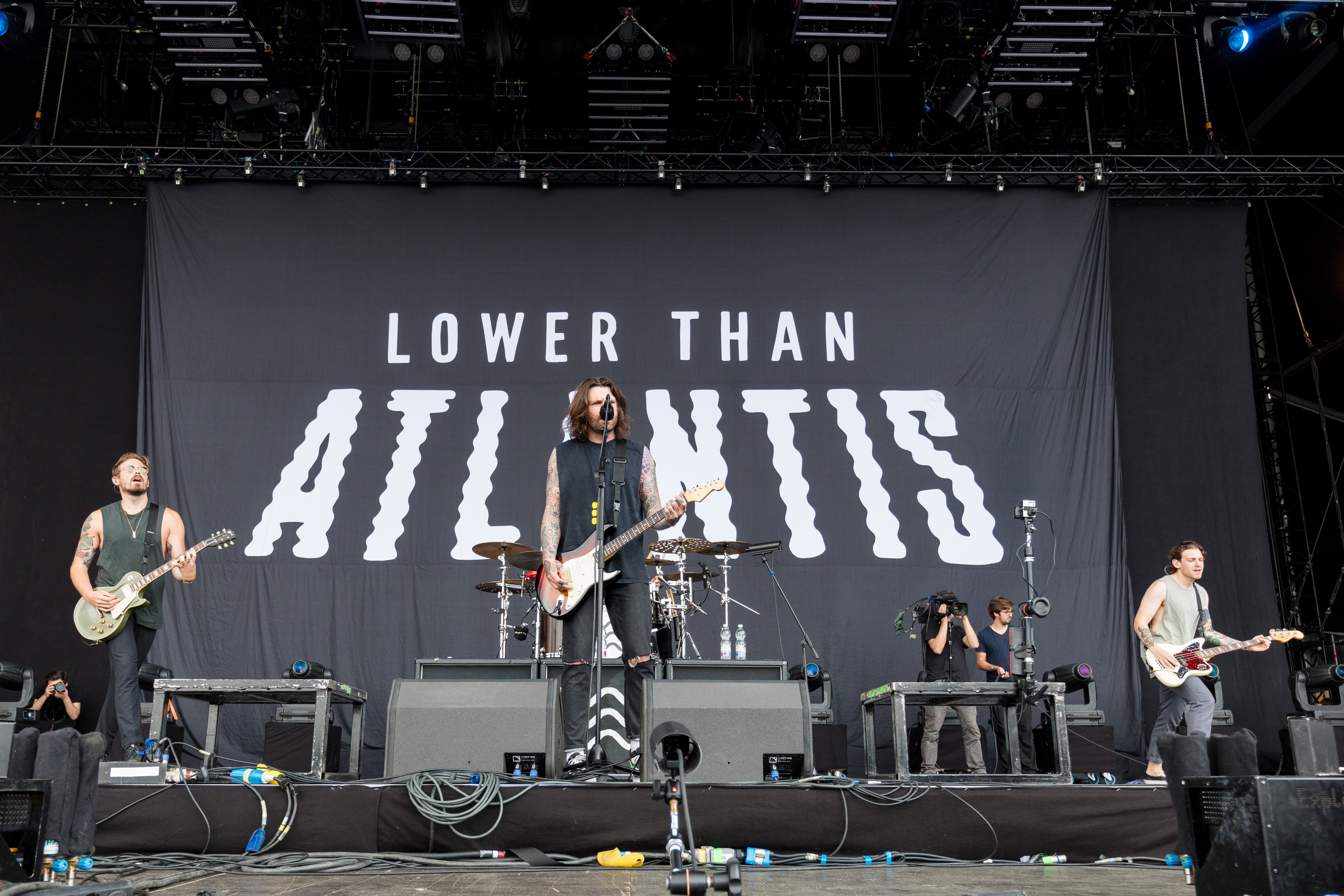
Lower Than Atlantis performing at Rock am Ring 2017.

Following a premier on BBC Radio 1, "Work for It" was released as a single on 17 August 2016. Duce explained that with their previous album, the group released "the 'best' song" first and found it "hard to follow-up single-wise." With Safe in Sound, the group wanted to be "strategically building with singles this time round – they get better and better!" At the end of August, the band performed at the Reading and Leeds Festivals. A music video was released for "Work for It" on 12 September, directed by Ben Roe. The video features the band performing in a bar. Duce described the video as "making a choice, is it the right one? Who knows." On 30 October, Safe in Sound was announced for release, and the album's artwork and track listing was revealed. On the same day, a music video was released for "Dumb". In November, the band supported You Me at Six on their tour of Europe. On 30 November, a music video was released for "Had Enough", directed by Chris Hugall.

On 20 January 2017, "Boomerang" was made available for streaming. Safe in Sound was released on 3 February through Sony Music-affiliated labels Easy Life Records and Red Essential. In March, the band went on a co-headlining tour of Europe with Young Guns, followed by headlining UK tour with support from Young Guns, Hands Like Houses and Roam. In June, the band supported Blink-182 for a few shows in Germany, and performed at Rock am Ring. In July, the group appeared at the 2000 Trees festival in the UK. In November and December, the band supported Enter Shikari on their tour of the UK and Europe. On 22 March 2018, a music video was released for "I Would", consisting of tour footage from the previous year. In April, the band went on a headlining tour of the UK with support from Milk Teeth and The Faim. Following this, the group supported Sleeping with Sirens on their headlining tour in Australia and New Zealand. In May, the band continued their headlining UK tour with support from Boston Manor and The Faim. At the end of the month, the band performed at the Slam Dunk Festival.

== Reception ==
Professional ratings
Aggregate scores
Source	Rating
Metacritic	74/100
Review scores
Source	Rating
Belfast Telegraph	7/10
Clash	7/10
Dead Press!	7/10 stars
The Irish Times	3/5 stars
Kerrang!	4/5
Milwaukee Journal Sentinel	Favorable
Q	3/5 stars
Rock Sound	8/10
Stereoboard	3/5 stars
Upset	4/5 stars

Safe in Sound sat at number 4 on the UK midweek chart, before eventually charting at number 8. The album also charted at number 9 in Scotland.

Safe in Sound received generally favourable reviews. Belfast Telegraph reviewer Ryan Ward called the album a "decent attempt" in making "radio friendly heavy(ish) rock." He noted that it featured "solid musical craftsmanship " with some "very listenable tracks throughout." Lisa Henderson of Clash said the album was full of "robust, riotous anthems." She wrote that the album was "a case in point" that the band are capable of being "at their finest" when they are able to "strike a balance between their pop tendencies and their grunge roots." Writing for The Irish Times, Lauren Murphy mentioned that while the band "take their cue from the emo and hardcore scenes," the album "intermittently strays from that path." She referred to it as a "generally celebratory, upbeat collection."

Paul Travers of Kerrang! wrote that the album was "polished and layered: the most expansive and accessible album they've yet created." He mentioned that despite the "rough-and-tumble lyrics," the album was sonically "huge without having to resort to sheer volume." In a short review for Milwaukee Journal Sentinel, Jon M. Gilbertson wrote that despite Safe in Sound being "steeped in the softer anthemic qualities" of groups such as U2 and Coldplay, it was "basically a modern-pop slab suitable for chill-out hours." Q reviewer Thea de Gallier wrote that with their previous two albums, Changing Tune and the self-titled, the band rode the line between punk rock and indie rock. They "lean[ed] ever more towards the latter and now they arrive at the sparse, bouncy pop" of Safe in Sound.

Rob Sayce of Rock Sound wrote that the album was "engineered for the airwaves; almost every song produced and polished to within an inch of its life." He commented that while it was "immaculately constructed", it felt like "the soul and feeling has been lost in the process." Stereoboard reviewer Liam Turner wrote that the album was the band's "latest attempt to perfect the fusion of hard rock and poppy commercialism." He mentioned that it was "virtually indistinguishable" from their self-titled album. Ali Shutler of Upset wrote that the group was "building on the direct aims" of the self-titled album, in that they "fully embraced the ... ability to write a banger, ‘Safe In Sound’ gets straight to the point."

== Track listing ==
Writing credits per BMI and ASCAP.

No.	Title	Writer(s)	Length
1.	"Had Enough"	Mike Duce; Julian Emery; Declan Hart; Dan Lancaster; Ben Sansom; Eddy Thrower	3:20
2.	"Dumb"	Duce; Lancaster	3:21
3.	"Long Time Coming"	Duce; Hart; Lancaster; Dan McDougall; Sansom; Thrower	3:06
4.	"Boomerang"	James Bay; Duce; Jonathan Green; Hart; Sansom; Thrower	3:45
5.	"Work for It"	Duce; Lancaster	3:18
6.	"Could Be Worse"	Duce; McDougall	3:21
7.	"I Would"	Duce; McDougall	3:12
8.	"Money"		3:51
9.	"I Don't Want to Be Here Anymore"		4:10
10.	"A Night to Forget"	Duce; Hart; McDougall; Sansom; Thrower	3:01
Total length:			34:25

== Personnel ==
Personnel per booklet, except where noted.

Lower Than Atlantis

- Mike Duce – vocals, guitar
- Declan Hart – bass
- Ben Sansom – guitar
- Eddy Thrower – drums

Production

- Dan Lancaster – producer, mixing, drums and vocals engineer
- Ben Sansom – guitar and bass engineer
- Sam Harper – assistant
- Darren Jones – additional drum engineering
- Jamie McEvoy – assistant
- Dick Beetham – mastering
- Jordan Green – album photography
- Eddy Thrower – album artwork design, layout, creative direction

== Charts ==
Chart (2017)	Peak position
Scottish Albums (OCC)	9
UK Albums (OCC)	8
