= Dear Prudence (disambiguation) =

"Dear Prudence" is a song by the English rock band the Beatles.

Dear Prudence may also refer to:

- Dear Prudence (advice column), an advice column in the online magazine Slate
- Dear Prudence (band), an alternative pop band from Brighton
- Dear Prudence (2008 film), a Hallmark Channel original made-for-TV movie
- Dear Prudence (2010 film), a French drama film
