= World Record (disambiguation) =

A world record is usually the best global performance ever recorded and verified in a specific skill or sport.

World Record may also refer to:

- World Record (Lower Than Atlantis album) (2011)
- World Record (Neil Young & Crazy Horse album) (2022)
- World Record (Van der Graaf Generator album) (1976)
- "World Record" (The Animatrix), a segment of The Animatrix
- World Record Club, a defunct UK mail-order record company

== See also ==
- Guinness World Records, a reference book listing world and national records
