= Lower Than Atlantis (album) =

Studio album by Lower Than Atlantis
- Released: 6 October 2014
- Recorded: 2013–2014, Watford and Devon
- Genres: Alternative rock; power pop
- Length: 41:31
- Label: Sony Music
- Producer: Dan Lancaster

Lower Than Atlantis chronology
Changing Tune (2012)	Lower Than Atlantis (2014)	Safe in Sound (2017)

Singles from Lower Than Atlantis
- 1. "Here We Go" Released: 3 June 2014; 2. "English Kids in America" Released: August 2014; 3. "Emily"/"English Kids in America" Released: 29 September 2014; 4. "Words Don't Come So Easily" Released: 18 May 2015

Singles from Lower Than Atlantis: Black Edition
- 1. "Get Over It" Released: 18 September 2015

Lower Than Atlantis is the fourth studio album by British rock band Lower Than Atlantis. With the release of Changing Tune (2012), the band moved to an arena rock-orientated sound. Following the touring cycle for Changing Tune, Island Records gave the band an ultimatum. The result of which ended with the band taking a label advance and building their own recording studio in Watford in July 2013. Discussing new material, vocalist/guitarist Mike Duce called the lyrics "quite vague" compared to his previous autobiographical work. Bassist Declan Hart listed Pantera, C2C and The 1975, among others, as influences for the album. Recording was done with producer Dan Lancaster over the course of "seven or eight months". Lancaster constantly pushed the band to get the best take. The band soon moved to Peter Miles' studio in Devon to record drum tracks.

After recording was finished in February 2014, the band signed to Sony Music Entertainment. "Here We Go" was released as a single in June, which was soon followed by a UK tour a month later. "English Kids in America" was released as a single in August, followed by a double A-side single of "Emily" and "English Kids in America" in September. Lower Than Atlantis was released on 6 October through Sony Music Entertainment. The band supported A Day to Remember in November on their UK tour. In April 2015 the band went on a headlining tour of the UK. "Words Don't Come So Easily" was released as a single in May. In September, "Get Over It" was released as a single. The Black Edition of the album was released in November and features an extra disc of bonus material.

== Background ==
Lower Than Atlantis released Changing Tune in October 2012 through major label Island Records. The album had an arena rock sound that showed the band's progression and an attempt to enter mainstream consciousness. Island Records were streamlining the label and artists that undersold a certain number of records were dropped. Despite the album reaching the top 30, it undersold the label's expectations. The band couldn't be dropped since the label had picked the option for the band's next album. The label wanted the band "to be almost as popular as a pop band and it was just never going to happen", according to guitarist Ben Sansom. The band's manager had a meeting with Island Records to secure a budget for the band's next album. Their manager said the label "don't really wanna do it."

Island Records gave the band a choice: "We're legally obliged to make your [next album] but we’re not really up for it. So we either do it or do a half-arsed job of it or you can take your full record advance and leave." The band took the advance and used it to build a recording studio in Watford in July 2013. A friend of the band had a lease on a few rehearsal rooms. The band initially wanted the room as a storage area for their equipment, but this soon changed into a storage and rehearsal area, then into a storage, rehearsal and recording studio. Sansom spent a week looking up studio equipment on Gumtree, which the band would drive to pick up. Two items of gear the band acquired was a tape machine and a 1980s recording console.

In July 2013, the band played at the 2013 edition of T in the Park festival in Balado, Scotland. The band's performance took place in a 20,000 capacity tent with only three rows of people in attendance. After the performance, vocalist/guitarist Mike Duce exclaimed "We're done, aren't we?" Following this, the band members proceeded to go their separate ways: Duce co-wrote songs for artists such as 5 Seconds of Summer, Sansom and bassist Declan Hart did production work, and drummer Eddy Thrower did session work for groups such as One Direction.

== Recording ==
Lower Than Atlantis was produced by Dan Lancaster, over the course of "seven or eight months". (Note: Lancaster previously worked with the band on Far Q (2010), which he produced, engineered and mixed.) The band brought Lancaster in because of his pop credentials, his heavy rock background and the ability to merge the two. After every recording session the group had a demo where they would re-record each instrument part-by-part. Lancaster would constantly attempt to get the best take every time, according to Duce: "He'd be like: 'That was shit. You've got to do it again.' There's no bullshit." Previously, the band would worry if they made a mistake, as it would cost a lot to hire the studio and personnel; however, since the band had their own studio, they took it at a leisurely pace. Three drum tracks were recorded at the band's studio, before the band relocated to Peter Miles' studio in Devon where they recorded the remaining drum tracks.

Electronic beats were used during recording, which resulted in Thrower changing his thought process to that of a session player. Thrower thought it was a "refreshing" experience. Lancaster mixed almost all of the tracks, except for "Here We Go" and "Damn Nation", which were mixed by Neal Avron. Miles engineered drums on all of the songs, except for "Here We Go", which was done by Lancaster. The album was mastered by Dick Beetham. In an October 2013 announcement, the band said they were going to start "sift[ing] through all the new material/demos to start deciphering where we're at album wise". In February 2014 the band announced that the album was done.

== Composition ==
With the lyrics, Duce called them "quite vague" compared to his previous autobiographical lyrics. Discussing the band's sound, Duce said "I'm 25. It's time to stop acting like a fucking child – I'm definitely less of a nutter". Duce said that all of the material sound "completely different from each other" due to them being "written over such an expansive period of time." They are "all catchy, our writing with a very pop sensibility like a pop structure." He wanted to expand beyond the guitar-bass-drums structure, incorporating hints of electronic music throughout the album. Hart listed "Domination" by Pantera, "Down the Road" by C2C, and "Chocolate" by The 1975, among others, as songs that influenced the album.

"Here We Go" was intended to be a B-side. In its original demo form, which was done in a day, the song was a chord progression a number of riffs. The band eventually thought it was "really fucking good", according to Duce, to the extent that the band sent it a few colleagues. They thought the song should be a single, and the track was recorded the following day. The intro to "Ain't No Friend" is the producer's voice in single notes that the band made to sound like chords. The chords were then constructed to make the chord progression which Duce sang over. The song talks about the end of a relationship. "English Kids in America" is about the band's first tour in America. The pre-chorus guitar riff had been written by Duce "ages ago". "Criminal" is about the band learning from their experience of being on a major label. The string section was added later on and the band think "they make the song". "Words Don't Come So Easily" was intended to be fully acoustic. The song does start with an acoustic intro before turning into a full-band effort. The post-chorus guitar riff consisted of a single note that was cut and pasted in Pro Tools.

"Emily" was written between Duce and a collective known as The Invisible Men. The song was written as a joke about Duce's dog Rosie. After realising he was stretching a two-syllable word over a three-syllable melody, Duce substituted Rosie for Emily. (Note: One Direction almost recorded "Emily" after someone had submitted the track. The Invisible Men had asked Duce if they could shop the song around. Hart said that if One Direction are "going to pop-ify it then nah, we want that because obviously it's a good song.") The middle eight section in "Stays the Same" consists of several percussion instruments recorded in a live room. The instruments were "smashed out [in] syncopated rhythms". "Live Slow, Die Old" is despite how "rich, powerful, strong or intelligent" a person may be, they will die, according to Duce. "Damn Nation" is Duce venting about how he disagrees with organised religion. Duce had previously been subjected to religion being "forced down my throat" from when he was young. Duce loved the lyric "time time ticking by, the one thing we spend we cannot buy", which resulted in him writing "Time". "Just What You Need" refers to sex. "Number One" is about Duce "wanting to leave my mark on this earth" and him being in the band "is hopefully me leaving a piece of me behind."

== Release ==
After recording the album, the band signed to Sony Music Entertainment, who were already big fans of the band. On 2 June 2014, Lower Than Atlantis was announced and the track listing & artwork was revealed. Duce explained, when "listening [to a band] for the first time, I would normally go for the self-titled [...] as there must be a reason its self-titled. We wanted this album to be that album for us." A music video was released for "Here We Go" on the same day, directed by Daniel Broadley. After premiering on BBC Radio 1, "Here We Go" was released as a single the following day. The group went on a UK tour in July with support from Decade and Yearbook. A live video was released of the band performing "Ain't No Friend" was released on 24 July. "English Kids in America" was released as a single in August, with an instrumental version of the song as the B-side, prior to the release of the album.

A music video was released for "English Kids in America" on 13 August and features the band driving around the US. It was also directed by Broadley. "Emily" was made available for streaming on 8 September, the day after its world exclusive premiere on BBC Radio 1 with Daniel P Carter. On 25 September, "Sewer Side" was made available for streaming. "Emily" and "English Kids in America" were released as a double A-side single on 29 September. On 1 October, Lower Than Atlantis was made available for streaming. An Emily EP was released as released on 3 October. It featured "Emily", "English Kids in America", an alternative version of "English Kids in America" and "I'm Partying". A music video was released for "Emily", directed by Barney Dick. Lower Than Atlantis was planned for release in late September, but was pushed back a week, for release on 6 October. The physical deluxe edition included three new songs, while the digital deluxe edition included four alternative versions of songs.

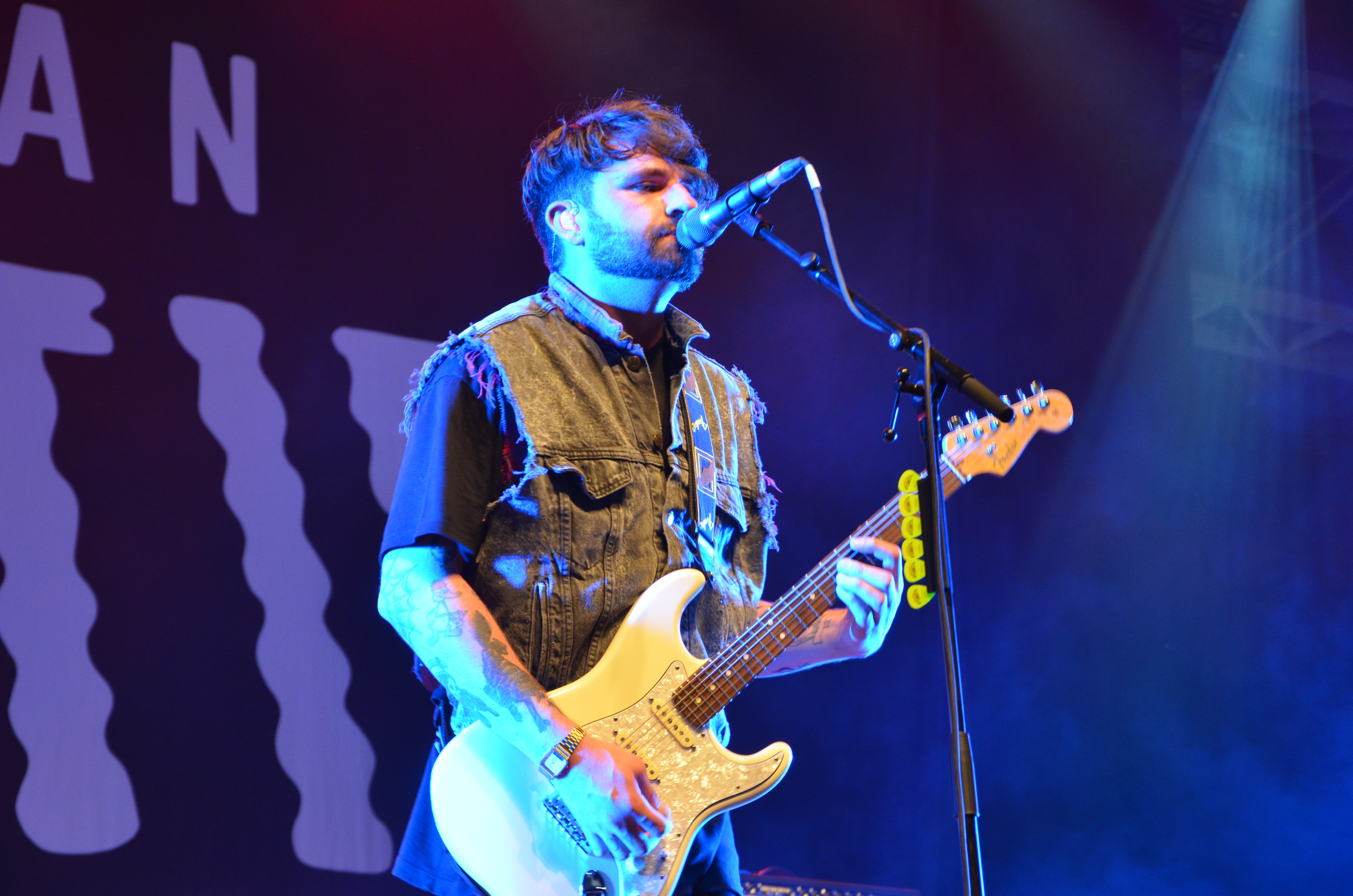
Vocalist/guitarist Mike Duce performing at Rock am Ring 2015.

To promote its release, the band did in-store acoustic performances and signing sessions, and played an album release show in Camden. In November, the band supported A Day to Remember on their All Signs Point to Britain tour of the UK. On 23 December 2014, a music video was released for "Criminal", directed by Jordan Green. It was filmed at a sold-out show at the KOKO in London. The band went on a headlining tour of the UK in April with We Are the Ocean and PVRIS as support acts. On 20 April, the music video for "Words Don't Come So Easily" was released. The song was released as a single on 18 May. At the end of May, the band performed at the Slam Dunk Festival. Following this, the band performed at Rock am Ring. On 18 September, the band released "Get Over It". The song had been recorded three weeks prior.

On 24 September, a music video was released for the song, directed by Andrew Groves. Thrower came up with the concept for the video, Duce explained that the band have "done a few different bits on this record and I think we wanted something that was direct but also a little more cinematic." In early-to-mid October, the band supported Hands Like Houses in Australia, then supporting them in the US in October and November. On 6 November, the band's cover of "A Thousand Miles" was made available for streaming. On 12 November, "The Reason" was made available for streaming. The album was reissued with a whole extra disc of bonus tracks, under the name Lower Than Atlantis: Black Edition, on 20 November. The reissue features new artwork. The band went on a tour of the UK in December with support from Moose Blood, As It Is, Brawlers and Black Foxxes.

== Reception ==
Professional ratings
Review scores
Source	Rating
Dead Press!	5/10 stars
Digital Spy	2/5 stars
DIY	4/5 stars
Melodic	3.5/5 stars
Metal Hammer	Favourable
Sputnikmusic	3/5

In an interview, Duce explained that if the album wasn't well received, it signal the end of the band's career: "Depending on the reaction we get, however, this could well end up being our last album." The album charted at number 14 in Scotland and at number 16 in the UK. "Here We Go" peaked at number 86 in the UK. It spent six weeks on BBC Radio 1's A-list and would later go on to sell 50,000 copies worldwide. "Get Over It" charted at number 181 in the UK. Lower Than Atlantis was included at number 1 on Rock Sound's "Top 50 Albums of the Year" list. The album "saw its creators take their first steps towards the biggest stages the country has to offer."

Reviewing the album for Rock Sound, editor Ryan Bird said the band released "the best album they've ever made" and "possibly the best album you'll hear this year." He noted that all of the songs "present[ed] not only a massive step up in quality" but also "an equally gargantuan sound". The album "disregards everything going on around it, shunning all trends [...] in favour of simply making a great rock album." Bird mentioned that the majority of the songs featured on the album "could easily nestle among the Top 40." Overall, he said it was "a diamond in the rough; an album fully justified of every bit of praise throw its way."

== Track listing ==
Writing credits per BMI and ASCAP.

No.	Title	Writer(s)	Length
1.	"Here We Go"	Mike Duce; Declan Hart; Dan Lancaster; Ben Sansom; Eddy Thrower	3:42
2.	"Ain't No Friend"	Duce; Hart; Lancaster; Sansom; Thrower	3:53
3.	"English Kids in America"	Duce; Hart; Lancaster; Sansom; Thrower	3:23
4.	"Criminal"	Duce; Hart; Lancaster; Stephen Robson; Sansom; Thrower	2:57
5.	"Words Don't Come So Easily"	George Astasio; Duce; Hart; Lancaster; Jason Pebworth; Samson; Jonathan Shave; Thrower	3:18
6.	"Emily"	Astasio; Duce; Hart; Lancaster; Pebworth; Samson; Shave; Thrower	3:31
7.	"Stays the Same"	Duce; Hart; Lancaster; Sansom; Thrower	3:40
8.	"Live Slow, Die Old"	Duce; Julian Emery; Hart; Jim Irvin; Sansom; Thrower	3:34
9.	"Damn Nation"	Duce; Hart; Lancaster; Sansom; Thrower	3:37
10.	"Time"	Duce; Emery; Hart; Irvin; Lancaster; Sansom; Thrower	3:45
11.	"Just What You Need"	Astasio; Duce; Hart; Lancaster; Pebworth; Samson; Shave; Thrower	2:40
12.	"Number One"	Duce; Emery; Hart; Irvin; Sansom; Thrower	3:26

Lower Than Atlantis – Deluxe edition bonus tracks (CD)
No.	Title	Writer(s)	Length
13.	"I'm Partying"	Duce; Hart; Lancaster; Sansom; Thrower	2:57
14.	"Superhero"	Duce; Hart; Lancaster; Sansom; Thrower	2:32
15.	"Sewer Side"	Duce; Hart; Lancaster; Sansom; Thrower	2:45
Total length:			49:45

Lower Than Atlantis – Deluxe edition bonus tracks (digital download)
No.	Title	Writer(s)	Length
13.	"Here We Go" (alternative)	Duce; Sansom; Hart; Thrower; Lancaster	3:35
14.	"English Kids in America" (alternative)	Duce; Sansom; Hart; Thrower; Lancaster	3:39
15.	"Words Don't Come So Easily" (alternative)	Duce; Sansom; Hart; Thrower; Astasio; Pebworth; Shave	3:06
16.	"Ain't No Friend" (alternative)	Duce; Sansom; Hart; Thrower; Lancaster	3:33
Total length:			55:24

Lower Than Atlantis: The Black Edition – bonus disc
No.	Title	Length
1.	"Get Over It"	3:41
2.	"The Reason"	3:39
3.	"I'm Partying"	2:57
4.	"Superhero"	2:32
5.	"Sewer Side"	2:45
6.	"Real Love" (Clean Bandit cover) (Live Lounge performance)	3:41
7.	"Am I Wrong?" (Nico & Vinz cover) (Live Lounge performance)	4:08
8.	"Strong" (Robbie Williams cover)	4:18
9.	"Wish You Were Here" (Incubus cover)	3:36
10.	"Everybody Wants to Rule the World" (Tears for Fears cover)	4:02
11.	"A Thousand Miles" (Vanessa Carlton cover)	4:12
12.	"Here We Go" (alternative)	3:35
13.	"English Kids in America" (alternative)	3:39
14.	"Words Don't Come So Easily" (alternative)	3:06
15.	"Ain't No Friend" (alternative)	3:33

== Personnel ==
Personnel per physical deluxe edition booklet.

Lower Than Atlantis

- Mike Duce – guitar, vocals
- Eddy Thrower – drums
- Ben Sansom – guitar
- Declan Hart – bass

Production

- Dan Lancaster – producer; mixing on "Here We Go" and "Damn Nation"; drums engineer on "Here We Go"
- Neal Avron – mixing except for "Here We Go" and "Damn Nation"
- Peter Miles – drums engineer except for "Here We Go"
- Dick Beetham – mastering
- Josh Halling, Jordan Green, Josh Mansfield – album photography
- Storehouse Agency – album layout

== Chart performance ==
Chart (2014)	Peak position
Scottish Albums Chart	14
UK Albums Chart	16
UK Downloads Chart Top 100	11
UK Physical Chart Top 100	21
