= Changing Tune =

Studio album by Lower Than Atlantis
- Released: 1 October 2012
- Recorded: Early 2012 at Rockfield Studios
- Genre: Arena rock
- Length: 36:48
- Label: Island
- Producers: John Mitchell, Ben Humphreys

Lower Than Atlantis chronology
World Record (2011)	Changing Tune (2012)	Lower Than Atlantis (2014)

Singles from Changing Tune
- 1. "Love Someone Else" Released: 17 July 2012; 2. "Go on Strike" Released: 8 February 2013; 3. "Something Better Came Along" Released: 29 April 2013

Changing Tune is the third studio album and major label debut by English rock band Lower Than Atlantis. Preceded by the non-album single "If the World Was to End", the band went on their first ever headlining tour in the UK in January 2012.

== Background ==
Lower Than Atlantis released "If the World Was to End" as a single in January 2012. The song was produced by John Mitchell, who bassist Dec Hart and drummer Eddy Thrower had known for longer than the rest of the band. Following this, they went on their first headline tour in the UK. On the final night of the tour, 27 January, the band announced they had signed to major label Island Records. Island's promise of more income is what convinced the band sign with the label. Duce revealed that despite the increase of income "Nothing's really changed" for the band except for "the financial backing that we didn't have before". Everything the band has done previously was with their own money. The band supported Young Guns in Europe in February and March.

== Recording and sound ==
Island suggested to that the band went into pre-production with a producer. The band were against this idea as they claimed that no one else knows how they should sound apart from themselves. The group rented out a room for a week and guitarist Ben Sansom brought in his computer, which the band recorded into live. Changing Tune was recorded in early 2012 at Rockfield Studios with Mitchell and Ben Humphreys producing. (Note: Both Mitchell and Humphreys previously worked with the band World Record (2010), which Mitchell mixed, while Humphreys recorded and engineered it.) Humphreys and Josh Tyrell helped with recording and engineering. Rockfield Studios was a residential studio, which the band preferred as they had previously needed to drive. Duce revealed that their previous releases were "rushed, on a shoestring budget and against the clock." The drum tracks were recorded in "two and half days... three days", according to Thrower. With Changing Tune, the group had the time and equipment to use to their advantage. The band were able to work at any time of their choosing, whereas on previous occasions, the group had to work between 10 and 6. Sansom said that the album combines the sounds of Far Q (2010) and World Record (2011) – the latter of which Sansom thought the band "only covered a small ground" with the pop-rock songs found on it.

For the album, the band used several different guitars and amplifiers as they had time to experiment. This in turn made it take longer for the band to track guitars. The band had recorded 16 tracks, all of which were written by Duce, but were credited to the band as a whole. The band spent more time on "Prologue" than on the other tracks on the album. Duce wanted the song "to really make an impact." The first half on the song was recorded outside of the studio. A theremin can be heard on the track, but this was played through an app on Duce's phone. "War with Words" is about Duce experiencing writer's block. "Scared of the Dark" had been written by Duce shortly before the band had entered the studio. Mitchell played Rhodes piano on the track. He claimed that the band didn't intend to record it for the album. Thrower didn't initially want to add drums to it, making it sound like the other slow songs on the album. Madeleine Poncia of Dear Prudence sings additional vocals on the song. In an April interview with NME, Duce said that recording was done "a couple of weeks ago" and that it was to be mixed "later this week." (Note: Asked about the inclusion of "If the World Was to End", Duce mentioned that the track was "a [standalone] thing". It was released due to the band having a few tracks left over and wishing to keep their momentum going. They did toy with the idea of including it, but realised "the songs we've got are really strong.") Mixing was performed by Mitchell, while Harry Hess mastered it.

== Release ==
On 11 June 2012, Changing Tune was announced and the track listing was revealed. Duce came up with the title, while Sansom described that it was about "changing your tune in the positive and being more up-beat about situations". On 9 July, the artwork was revealed, which was created by Paul Jackson. It was the band's vision of a "70s acid trip". "Love Someone Else" was released as a single on 17 July. The music video for it was released on 26 July and was directed by Luke Bellis. Despite the video's concept being set in an American diner, it was filmed in the UK. At the end of July, the band supported Blink-182 for three shows. In early August, the band performed at the Hevy Festival. On 15 August, a lyric video was released for "Normally Strange". Following this, the group appeared at the Reading and Leeds Festivals. On 28 August, the band made "Normally Strange" available for free download via their Facebook page.

Changing Tune was delayed from its 10 September release date, and its subsequent 17 September date, as a result of manufacturing issues. It was eventually released on 1 October. A version with additional tracks and a DVD was also released. Lower Than Atlantis went on a headlining tour in the UK in October 2012 with The Dangerous Summer, Don Broco and Transit. The band then toured Europe in November. On 6 January 2013, the music video for "Go on Strike" was released. The video was also directed by Bellis. The band then supported All Time Low in the UK for the first half of February. For the second half, the band toured Europe with Blitz Kids. "Go on Strike" was released as a single on 8 February. The band toured the UK in April with Dinosaur Pile-Up, The Xcerts and Blitz Kids supporting on The F*** It to the Man Tour. It was their biggest headlining tour to date. The music video for "Something Better Came Along", directed by Daniel Broadley, was released on 8 April. The video was filmed at a decommissioned tube station in Walthamstow, London. It was released as a single on 29 April.

== Reception ==
Professional ratings
Aggregate scores
Source	Rating
Metacritic	65/100
Review scores
Source	Rating
BBC Music	Unfavourable
Big Cheese	5/5
Bring the Noise	8/10
Contactmusic	Favourable
Dead Press!	5/10 stars
Metal Hammer	Favourable
NME	5/10

Changing Tune undersold what the label had expected. However, it was the band's best-selling release by November 2014. Sansom later recalled: "[Island Records] wanted us to be almost as popular as a pop band and it was just never going to happen. Jumping from World Record, we had to have an album that still 'rocked'." "Love Someone Else" peaked at number 184 on the UK Singles Chart. Changing Tune was released to a mixed reaction from critics, with an aggregate score of 65 on the Metacritic website which indicate "generally favorable reviews".

Changing Tune was ranked at number 6 on Kerrang Radio's "Top 10 Albums of 2012" list.

== Track listing ==
All tracks written by Lower Than Atlantis. Lyrics by Mike Duce.

1. "Prologue" – 2:49
2. "Love Someone Else" – 2:30
3. "Move Along" – 2:59
4. "Wars with Words" – 1:49
5. "Go on Strike" – 2:52
6. "Scared of the Dark" – 4:22
7. "Normally Strange" – 3:26
8. "Something Better Came Along" – 3:59
9. "PMA" – 2:28
10. "Cool Kids" – 3:27
11. "I Know a Song That Will Get on Your Nerves" – 2:44
12. "Showtime" – 3:23

Deluxe edition bonus tracks
No.	Title	Length
13.	"Counting Sheep"	2:59
14.	"Soul Doubt"	3:59
15.	"Time Flies"	3:44
16.	"Short Way Home"	2:49
17.	"If the World Was to End"	3:53
Total length:		17:22

Deluxe edition bonus DVD
No.	Title	Length
1.	"On Our Terms"

== Personnel ==
Personnel per booklet.

Lower Than Atlantis

- Mike Duce – vocal, guitar
- Ben Sansom – guitar
- Eddy Thrower – drums
- Dec Hart – bass

Additional musicians

- Madeleine Poncia – additional vocals on "Scared of the Dark"
- John Mitchell – additional Rhodes piano

Production

- John Mitchell – producer, mixing
- Ben Humphreys – producer, recording, engineer
- Josh Tyrell – recording, engineer
- Harry Hess – mastering
- Keith Davey – design, art direction
- Paul Jackson – illustration

== Chart performance ==
Chart (2012)	Peak position
Scottish Albums Chart	23
UK Albums Chart	25
UK Downloads Chart Top 100	33
UK Physical Chart Top 100	25
