= Lower Than Atlantis =

English rock band

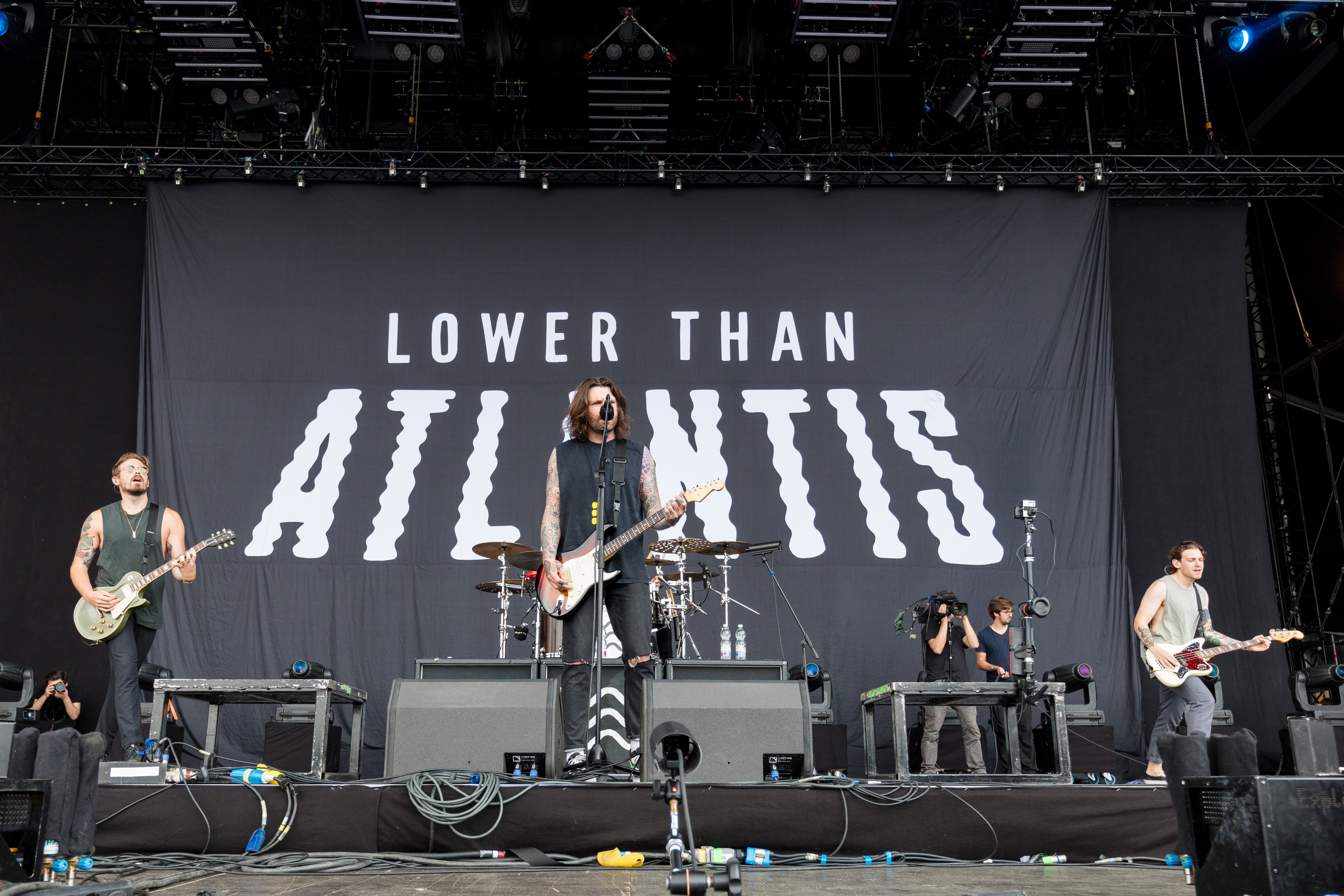
- Lower Than Atlantis at Rock am Ring 2017

Background information
- Origin: Watford, Hertfordshire, England
- Genres: Alternative rock; pop rock; punk rock; post-hardcore (early)
- Years active: 2007–2019
- Labels: Small Town; A Wolf at Your Door; Island; Sony Music Entertainment; Easy Life; Red Essential
- Past members: Mike Duce; Ben Sansom; Eddy Thrower; Declan Hart; Stephen Minter; Benjamin Jennings; Josh Pickett; Richard Wilkinson; Matt Britz; Luke Sansom; Lee Beaumont
- Website: www.lowerthanatlantis.co

Lower Than Atlantis were an English rock band from Watford, Hertfordshire. They formed in 2007 as a hardcore punk band and gradually shifted into a melodic rock sound over five studio albums, their last being 2017's Safe in Sound. The band consisted of vocalist, guitarist and songwriter Mike Duce, bassist Declan Hart, drummer Eddy Thrower, and guitarist Ben Sansom. They announced in December 2018 that they would be disbanding after a final 3 tour dates in 2019.

== History ==
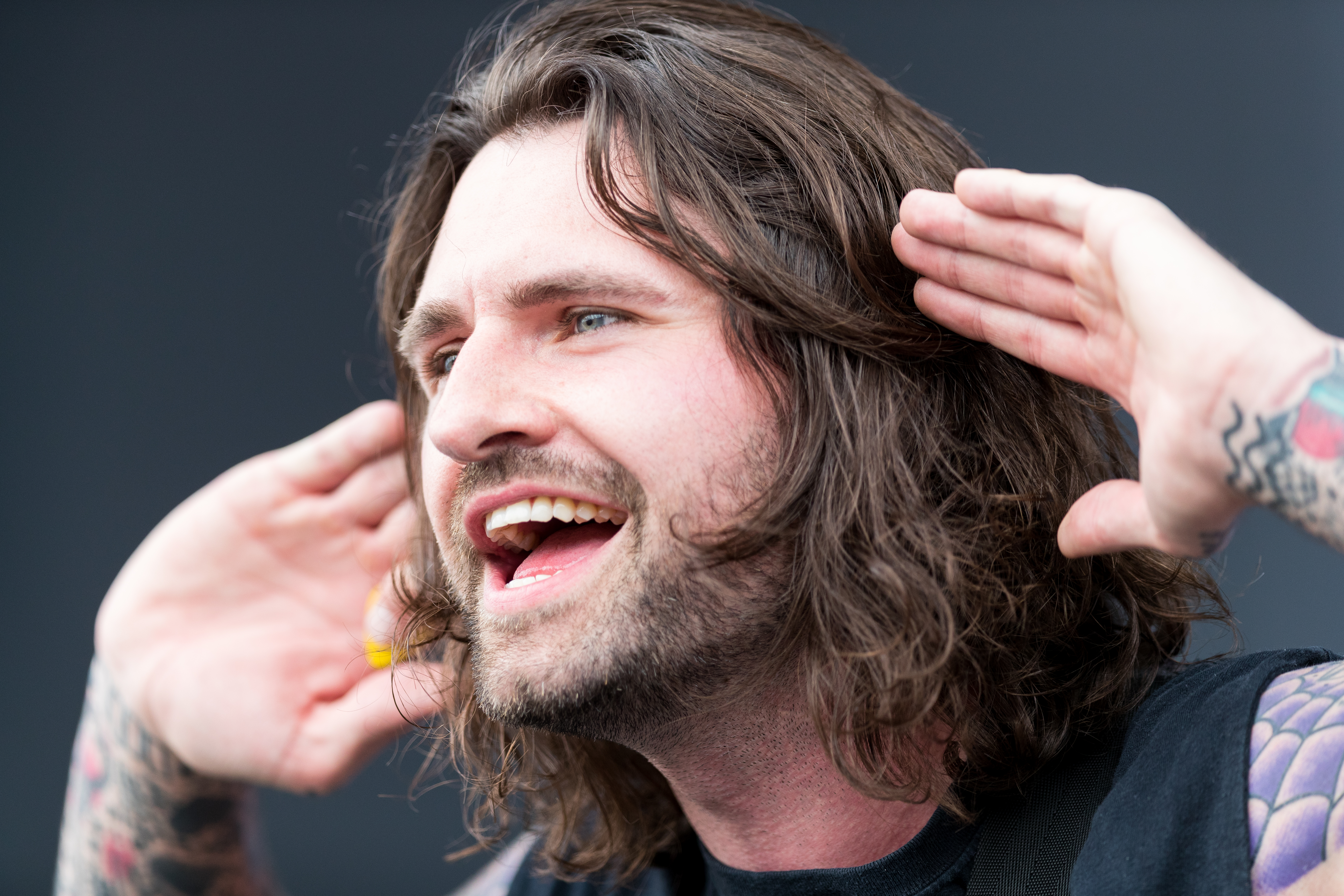
Mike Duce at Rock am Ring 2017

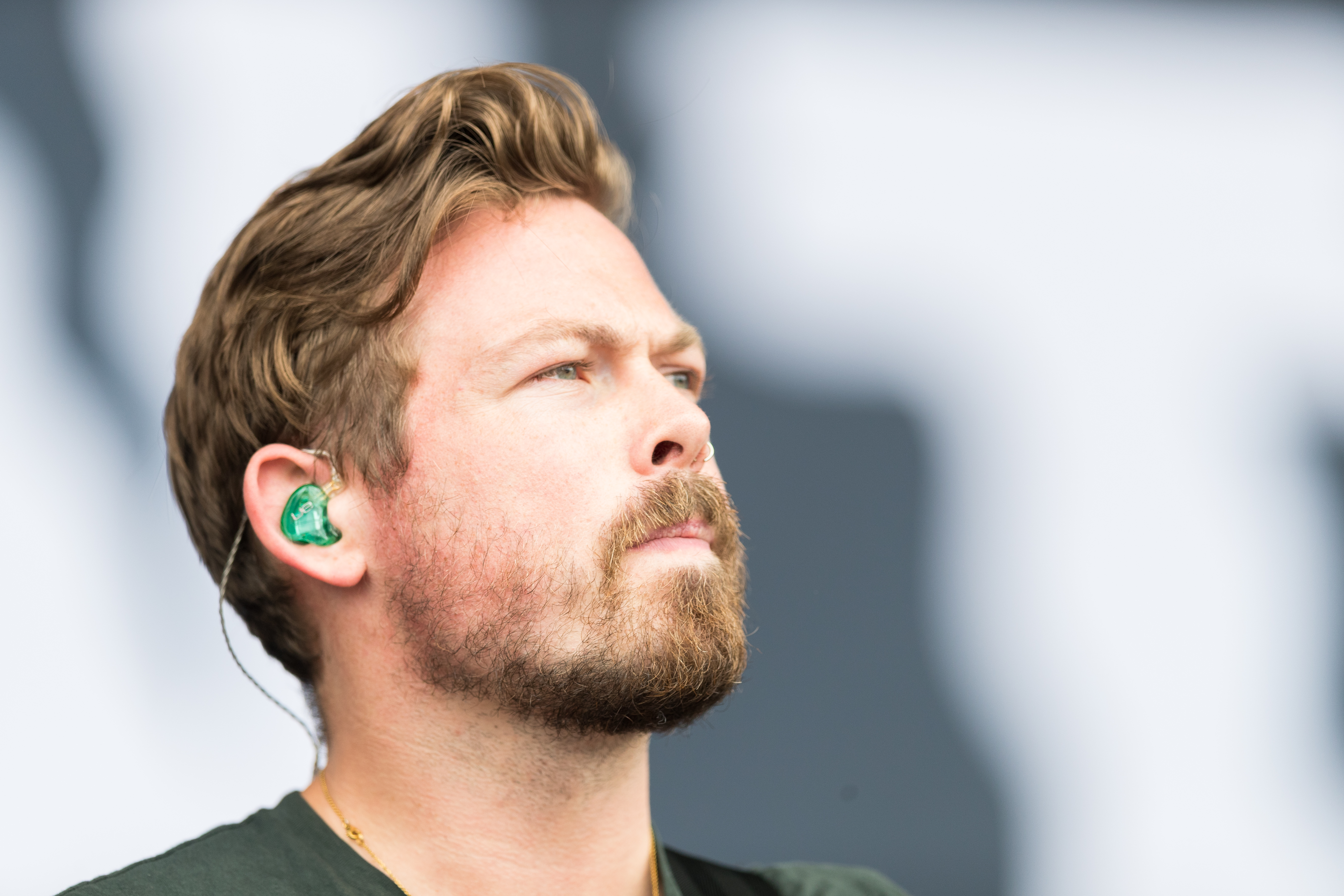
Lead Guitarist Ben Sansom at Rock am Ring 2017

=== 2007–09: Formation and Bretton ===
Lower Than Atlantis formed in 2007 while the members were attending college. Guitarist Ben Sansom asked guitarist Mike Duce if he wished to form a band with Ben's brother Luke, who would provide vocals. Alongside them was bassist Richard Wilkinson and drummer Matt Britz. They were initially called Atlantis. Duce said they renamed it to Lower Than Atlantis "because Atlantis sounds like your dad's covers band." Around this time, they released Demo 2007. Following line-up changes, such as the addition of drummer Josh Pickett, bassist Stephen Minter, and Duce becoming the band's frontman, they began working on what would become their first EP, Bretton. Bretton was released through Small Town on 18 October 2008. In June 2009, the band toured with We Stare at Mirrors. Through this tour, drummer Eddy Thrower met Duce and Sansom. We Stare at Mirrors bassist Declan Hart "thought Lower Than Atlantis were meth-heads. Their reputation was just mental." Partway through the touring cycle for the EP, the band had further line-up changes.

=== 2009–11: Far Q and World Record ===
Lower Than Atlantis released their full-length album, Far Q in March 2010 through A Wolf at Your Door Records in the UK, under the Distort Entertainment label in Canada and for rest of Europe under Redfield Records on limited mediabook CD and limited white vinyl.

The album was recorded their first album with Daniel Lancaster (of Hertfordshire band Proceed) at Studio Glasseye in Hatfield, England. This release retained some element of the band's punk roots whilst gearing itself more towards post-hardcore/melodic hardcore influences.

Before that Redfield Records release a 10" split-vinyl in February 2010 with the single Far Q together with tracks from Grace.Will.Fall, Talk Radio Talk and MNMTS.

Their second full-length album, World Record, was recorded at Outhouse Studios in Reading, England, and released via A Wolf at Your Door Records on 25 April 2011. It took strong alternative rock influences from bands such as Jimmy Eat World and Foo Fighters. World Record saw the band make a significant breakthrough both in terms of growth at live shows and radio airplay.

=== 2012–13: Island Records and Changing Tune ===
At the last show of their headline tour in support of second album World Record on 27 January 2012, the band announced that they had signed to Island Records. They then played a string of festivals such as Hit the Deck, Camden Crawl, Slam Dunk, Download, Y Not, Hevy and the Festival Republic Stage at Reading & Leeds festivals, all in the summer of 2012. On 14 September 2012, Lower Than Atlantis were the penultimate act at Butserfest and headlined Underground Festival on 30 September in Gloucester.

The band's third album Changing Tune, recorded early in 2012 at Rockfield Studios in Wales, was released on 1 October 2012, reaching no. 25 in the UK Official Album Charts. The album was accompanied by a UK headline tour that started in Exeter on 1 October and finished in London on 11 October.

The album's first single, "Love Someone Else", was premiered on Zane Lowe's evening show on Radio 1 on 16 July 2012. This single had a similar sound to World Record.

The band recorded a Christmas single entitled "Merry Christmas (Wherever You Are)" in 2012. After its premier on Zane Lowe's show, the hashtag #LTAforchristmasnumber1 became one of the top trending hashtags in the UK on Twitter. The track was also featured in the Christmas episode of Made in Chelsea.

They were the support act for All Time Low's UK tour during February 2013, and also played dates in the UK 6–16 February and a date in Paris, France, on 18 February.

In April 2013, the band embarked on their biggest UK headline tour to date, "The Fuck It to the Man Tour". On the tour, they had support from Dinosaur Pile-Up, The Xcerts and Blitz Kids.

=== 2014–16: Sony Records and Lower Than Atlantis ===
On 29 April 2014, the band announced through their Facebook and Twitter pages that they had signed to Sony Records and that their new album would be released via the label. Shortly afterwards, they were announced to be playing the NME stage at Reading and Leeds Festival later that year.

On 2 June, the band released the lead single from the new record, 'Here We Go'. The song went on to become their most successful single to date.

In July and into the start of August, Lower Than Atlantis went on a UK tour with Decade and Yearbook.

On 12 August 2014, the band released the second single from their self-titled 4th album, 'English Kids in America', along with a Music Video which was compiled from tour footage from their trip to America. The song was first played on BBC Radio One. The album was released on 6 October to very positive reviews from critics; praising the balance between development and maturity and the band's sound while maintaining the sound of the Rock genre.

In November 2014. UK, magazine Rock Sound rated Lower Than Atlantis as their #1 album of 2014. In the same month, the band supported A Day to Remember on their UK tour along with Decade.

In December 2014, Lower than Atlantis announced details of a UK & Ireland tour with support from PVRIS and We Are The Ocean. In April 2015, front man Mike Duce spoke to GiggingNI.com about their musical direction, his songwriting and past travels to Ireland.

Weeks before their first 2015 tour began, it was revealed that all dates completely sold out.

On 18 September 2015, the band released "Get Over It". The song had been recorded three weeks prior.

A music video for the song was directed by Andrew Groves.

Following the release of the 'Get Over It' the song spent a near record-breaking 13 weeks at number one on the Kerrang! Chart. A deluxe edition of the album (Lower Than Atlantis: Black) was released with a second disc including 'Get Over It', four other previously un-released tracks, four studio covers, two covers recorded in the BBC Radio 1 Live Lounge, and four songs from the original album recorded acoustically.

The band then embarked and their biggest headline tour yet including a sold-out performance at the Roundhouse in London.

In August 2016 they played yet again at Reading and Leeds Festival but this time on the more prestigious Main Stage, opening for acts such as Die Antwoord, Boy Better Know and Chvrches.

=== 2016–2019: Safe in Sound and disbandment ===
The band's fifth and final studio album Safe in Sound was released on 23 February through Sony Music Entertainment.

On 24 August 2016, the band announced a 7-date UK tour that would take place in March 2017. They have said that it will be their "biggest ever UK tour".

Safe in Sound was the band's highest-charting record in the UK, debuting at no.8 in its national album chart.

On 2 December 2018, the group announced they would be breaking up following three shows in May 2019. Their last show took place at Brixton Academy in London on 11 May.

== Musical style ==
Lower Than Atlantis formed as a hardcore punk band and their harsh initial style is evident on their debut EP Bretton. With each studio album, however, they introduced more melody and made their music more accessible. Thus, their 2010 debut album Far Q was categorized by critics as melodic hardcore, post-hardcore, and punk rock, while already a year later they moved into alternative rock, hard rock, and pop rock territory with World Record. Their subsequent albums remained within this territory and went even further from their hardcore roots.

== Members ==
Final line-up

- Mike Duce – guitar (2007–2019), backing vocals (2007–2008), lead vocals (2008–2019), bass (2009–2010)
- Ben Sansom – guitar (2007–2019)
- Eddy Thrower – drums (2009–2019)
- Declan Hart – bass (2010–2019)

Former members

- Benjamin Jennings – bass (2009)
- Stephen Minter – bass (2008–2009)
- Josh Pickett – drums (2008–2009)
- Richard Wilkinson – bass (2007–2008)
- Matt Britz – drums (2007–2008)
- Luke Sansom – lead vocals (2007–2008), bass (2009)
- Lee Beaumont – lead vocals (2007)

Timeline

== Discography ==
Studio albums

- Far Q (2010)
- World Record (2011)
- Changing Tune (2012)
- Lower Than Atlantis (2014)
- Safe in Sound (2017)
