= Dear Prudence (band) =

British alternative pop band

- Origin: Brighton, England
- Genres: Punk, pop
- Years active: 2011-present
- Label: London
- Members: Madeline Poncia; Paul Egan; Rick Ahir; Andy Highmore; Alexis Nunez
- Website: dearprudencemusic.com

Dear Prudence are an alternative pop five-piece-band from Brighton fronted by Madeline Poncia.

== 2011-12: Career beginnings ==
Dear Prudence formed in late 2011 and signed to London Records shortly after. The band picked up some early interest with features on NME and in Kerrang! magazine, along with a New Noise piece on Wonderland Magazine and Clixie Music Ones to Watch.

Dear Prudence take their name from the Siouxsie and The Banshees cover of The Beatles track "Dear Prudence". Madi has cited Siouxsie and The Banshees along with The Cure and Depeche Mode as her main musical influences on several occasions.

=== Valentine ===
On 22 April 2012 the band released their debut single ‘Valentine’ digitally, as well as a physical release through Rough Trade. The band performed the track on BBC2’s The Review Show along with a cover of ‘Echo Beach’ originally by Martha and the Muffins. Although the single did not chart the band picked up additional features in NME and Hit the Floor.

The band played Brighton’s The Great Escape Festival in May 2012, picking up another ones to watch feature courtesy of Drowned in Sound. Following the Great Escape Dear Prudence opened for Haim at a one off show at Dingwalls in London’s Camden Town. The band more recently featured on producer Oliver Koletzki’s track, ‘You See Red’.

=== Coming Apart Again ===
Dear Prudence released a new track in August 2012 which was made available on Facebook as a free download. ‘Coming Apart Again’ was added to the BBC Radio 1 playlist on 20 August, the same week as the band’s appearance on the BBC Introducing stage at the Reading and Leeds Festival.

== Notable live performances ==
- The Late Show with Joanne Good – 29 April 2012.
- Dot to Dot Festival - May 2012.
- Haim (main support), Dingwalls. Camden, London.
- Reading and Leeds Festival 2012.
