= World Record (Lower Than Atlantis album) =

Studio album by Lower Than Atlantis
- Released: 19 April 2011 (US), 25 April 2011 (UK)
- Recorded: October – November 2010
- Studio: Outhouse Studios, Reading
- Genre: Alternative rock, hard rock, pop rock
- Length: 37:08
- Label: A Wolf at Your Door, Sumerian Records

Lower Than Atlantis chronology
Far Q (2010)	World Record (2011)	Changing Tune (2012)

Singles from World Record
- 1. "Beech Like the Tree" Released: 14 February 2011; 2. "Deadliest Catch" Released: 18 April 2011; 3. "(Motor) Way of Life" Released: 20 June 2011

World Record is the second studio album by British rock band Lower Than Atlantis.

== Background and recording ==
Partway through the touring cycle for their Bretton (2008) EP, Lower Than Atlantis had several line-up changes. While writing songs for their debut album, Far Q (2010), the band's drummer left. They soon thought about drummer Eddy Thrower from We Stare at Mirrors, who the band had previously toured with, and called him, asking if he would like to partake in a practice session. Duce explained that the band "never worked with a good drummer before. [With Thrower,] [i]t was... nice." Shortly after the release of Far Q, We Stare at Mirrors bassist Declan Hart joined the band.

Following this, the band toured the UK as part of Rock Sound Presents... Powered by Fender tour in September and October, alongside Architects, Norma Jean and Devil Sold His Soul. Rock Sound predicted the band's popularity would increase following the tour. The band recorded World Record at Outhouse Studios in Reading in October. Ben Humphreys helped with recording and engineering. On Far Q, Thrower used a double bass pedal for a lot of fills. For the World Record, he used one bass pedal, and crash and ride cymbals. Mat Rider of The Holiday Plan contributes guest vocals on "Marilyn's Mansion". Thrower's dad John plays trumpet on "Another Sad Song". The recordings were mixed by John Mitchell, and then mastered by Alan Douches at West West Side in New York in November.

== Composition ==
All of the songs on World Record were written by vocalist/guitarist Mike Duce, but were credited to the band as a whole. Duce considers the album "a bit of a gamble" as the band created something they wanted to hear but at the same time they thought it would alienate the fans that enjoyed the fast-paced material found on Far Q. It had a more alternative rock sound influenced by Foo Fighters and Jimmy Eat World. This was something that Duce claimed no one else in the current music scene was doing. Duce also claimed that there might be "more albums sounding a bit like this afterwards..." The band were going for a bigger sound, compared to Far Q, as that half of that album has "blink-and-you'll-miss-it" moments, according to Duce.

"(Motor) Way of Life" is the band's view of life as a touring band. "Beech Like the Tree" is about Duce's friend Josh who models for a living. "High at Five" is about Duce's "overactive brain" – Duce would over think things and usually end in having panic attacks. "Uni 9MM" is about how the band envies their friends who graduated university, got jobs, etc. The band is "truly grateful that we get to do what we do but there's always that 'what if'?" "Another Sad Song" is about "Me being me", according to Duce. "Marilyn's Mansion" is about when Duce was younger, he would make dens in a forest where he would feel "safe". He wished that he had a similar sanctuary these days. "Deadliest Catch" is "about a girl! I won't bore you with gory details", according to Duce.

Duce had a fling with a female bassist in another band but she led Duce on, causing him to write "Bug". "Bug" was his nickname for the girl. "Up in Smoke" is about the fact Duce has smoked since he was 11/12 years old and is constantly trying to quit. "Could You? Would You?" is about Duce's friend's girlfriend. She would treat Duce's friend "like crap and I hate her". "Working for the Man by Day, Stickin' It to the Man by Night" is about Duce's old job as a labourer for a bricklayer when he was 16. Duce admitted that he tried to emanate the message of "Hey man, it's ok. We all go through some shitty experiences at work" through the lyrics. "R.O.I." is about where Duce's family originated from in Ireland and how Duce is unable to visit due to his schedule.

== Release ==
On 3 November 2010, the band announced that their new album would be titled World Record and was due for release early next year. The band went on a European tour in November and December, alongside The Ghost Inside, For the Fallen Dreams and Suffokate. On 12 January 2011, a music video was released for "Beech Like the Tree". Three days later, the album's track listing was revealed. On 18 January, the album's artwork was released, which was designed by Paul Jackson. On 8 February, it was announced the band had signed to Sumerian Records for North America. Sumerian founder Ash Avildsen said that the band were, after listing hardcore/punk bands At the Drive-In, Refused and Fugazi, a "fresh hope for a true blue-collar DIY punk rock band" bringing the "same spirit to the scene." "Beech Like the Tree" was released as single, with "Grounded" as the B-side, on 14 February. The band played a series of shows from 18 February until 10 March, before joining The Reckless and Relentless Tour supporting Asking Alexandria throughout March and April.

On 28 March, "Uni 9MM" was made available for streaming via Alternative Press. A couple of days later, a music video was released for "Deadliest Catch". It switches between the band playing and fan submissions. The band's scenes were filmed by the Brighton seafront. The band included fan-produced content due to having trouble filming the video's original concept. "Up in Smoke" was premiered via Noisecreep on 12 April. "Deadliest Catch" was released as a single, "Beside Myself" as the B-side, on 18 April. World Record was made available for streaming on 18 April through the group's Myspace profile. A double-disc edition contained World Record and their previous album Far Q (2010) was released the following day in the US. "Live by the Remote", "Grounded" and "Beside Myself" are tacked onto the end of World Record as bonus tracks. After being pushed back from its 4 April release date, World Record was released in the US through Sumerian Records on 19 April and in the UK through A Wolf at Your Door Records on 25 April.

In late April and early May, the band supported We Are the Ocean in the UK. At the end of May, the band appeared at the Slam Dunk Festival. The band toured the UK in June, with Futures as the support act and performed at the Download Festival. A music video was released for "(Motor) Way of Life" on 11 June. It was released as a single on 20 June with "Live by the Remote" as the B-side. In July, the band performed at the Sonisphere Festival and played their first London headlining show. Following this, the group played at the Hevy Festival in August and Butserfest in September. In October, the band supported You Me at Six on their tour of the UK. Later that month, the band performed for BBC Radio 1's Radio One Rocks event. In November, the band toured the US with Close Your Eyes. The band then supported Norma Jean from late November to mid December in the US on the Pizza Riot 2011 Tour. The band went on their first headlining UK tour in January 2012 with support acts Sights and Sounds and Marines. The band supported Young Guns in Europe in February and March.

As part of their 2019 3-date farewell tour, the band released 300 limited edition vinyl pressings of the album (100 per night).

== Reception ==
Professional ratings
Review scores
Source	Rating
AbsolutePunk	88%
AllMusic	3.5/5 stars
BBC Music	Favourable
Big Cheese	3/5
Bring the Noise	9/10
Contactmusic	8/10
Dead Press!	9/10 stars
Rock Sound	8/10

AbsolutePunk staff member Kelly Doherty called World Record an album that would "win [over] the mainstream" and drop "the hardcore". It mixes "memorable hooks" with alternative rock. Doherty noted that the album "is the sound of a young band on the verge of something brilliant." Doherty said the first half sounded "so promising", compared to the second half which is "[a let] down." Reviewing the album for Allmusic, William Ruhlmann proclaimed the band were "more musically ambitious" on this album. Ruhlmann said the band "stops and starts its rhythms" with Duce's "expressions." Ruhlmann claimed the album was more of a melodic hard rock released, compared to their previous album Far Q. BBC Music reviewer Raziq Rauf said the album shows the band moving to a "grungier sound, with even cleaner vocals." Rauf noted one "major criticism" with album – "slightly one-paced." Despite there being "little in the way of variety" Rauf found "very little poor content" on the album.

Publication	Accolade	Year	Rank
Big Cheese	50 Finest of 2011	2011	49th
Dead Press!	Top 10 Albums of 2011	2011	2nd
Metal Hammer	Staff Favourites	2011	1st
Rock Sound	Albums of the Year	2011	3rd

== Track listing ==
All songs written and composed by Lower Than Atlantis, lyrics by Mike Duce.

1. "(Motor) Way of Life" – 3:05
2. "Beech Like the Tree" – 2:18
3. "High at Five" – 3:59
4. "Uni 9MM" – 3:19
5. "Another Sad Song" – 4:31
6. "Marilyn's Mansion" – 1:34
7. "Deadliest Catch" – 3:40
8. "Bug" – 1:46
9. "Up in Smoke" – 3:04
10. "Could You? Would You?" – 3:46
11. "Working for the Man by Day, Stickin' It to the Man by Night" – 3:09
12. "R.O.I." – 2:51

US bonus tracks

13. "Live by the Remote, Die by the Remote" – 3:48
14. "Grounded" – 2:36
15. "Beside Myself" – 4:05

== Personnel ==
Personnel per booklet.

Lower Than Atlantis

- Mike Duce – vocals, guitar
- Ben Sansom – guitar
- Eddy Thrower – drums
- Declan Hart – bass

Additional musicians

- Matt Rider – guest vocals on "Marilyn's Mansion"
- John Thrower – trumpet on "Another Sad Song"

Production

- Ben Humphreys – recording, engineer
- John Mitchell – mixing
- Alan Douches – mastering
- Paul Jackson – artwork illustrations, layout
