= Far Q =

Studio album by Lower Than Atlantis
- Released: 29 March 2010
- Recorded: September–October 2009, Hertfordshire
- Genres: Melodic hardcore, post-hardcore, punk rock
- Length: 40:15
- Label: A Wolf at Your Door
- Producer: Daniel Lancaster

Lower Than Atlantis chronology
Bretton (2008)	Far Q (2010)	World Record (2011)

Singles from Far Q
- 1. "Taping Songs Off the Radio" Released: 1 March 2010; 2. "Far Q" Released: 19 July 2010

Far Q is the debut studio album by British rock band Lower Than Atlantis. Following multiple line-up changes, the band gained drummer Eddy Thrower before starting work on Far Q. The album was recorded above a printing factory in Hertfordshire between September and November 2009 with producer Daniel Lancaster. "Taping Songs Off the Radio" was released as a single in early March 2010 with Far Q following later that month. It was released through A Wolf at Your Door Records. A vinyl edition was released by German label Redfield. The album was critically lauded upon release. "Far Q" was released as a single in mid-July. In September and October, the band toured the UK on the Rock Sound Presents... Powered by Fender with Architects, Norma Jean and Devil Sold His Soul.

== Background ==
Lower Than Atlantis formed in 2007 while the members were attending college. Guitarist Ben Sansom asked guitarist Mike Duce if he wished to form a band with Ben's brother Luke, who would provide vocals. Alongside them was bassist Richard Wilkinson and drummer Matt Britz. Following line-up changes, such as the addition of drummer Josh Pickett, bassist Stephen Minter, and Duce becoming the band's frontman, they began working on what would become their first EP, Bretton.

Duce taught himself how to sing and play guitar at the same time while playing along to the band's Demo 2007 release. Bretton was released in December 2008. Partway through the touring cycle for the EP, the band had further line-up changes. In June 2009, the band toured with We Stare at Mirrors. Through this tour, drummer Eddy Thrower met Duce and Sansom. We Stare at Mirrors bassist Declan Hart "thought Lower Than Atlantis were meth-heads. Their reputation was just mental." Luke Sansom re-joined on bass, before leaving a second time.

== Composition and recording ==
While at university, Duce wrote the majority of songs that would feature on Far Q, which were later credited to the band as a whole. Duce wrote about his life experiences in Watford, such as working on building sites, going to the pub and relationships. "Eating Is Cheating" features references to bars and clubs in Watford. Ben Patashnik of Rock Sound described the album as taking "their first steps into more melodic territory", while at the same time keeping "the hard, gritty edge" of Bretton. The album's sound has been described as melodic hardcore, post-hardcore, and punk rock.

Shortly afterwards, the pair found themselves without a drummer. Duce called Sansom, asking "Why does everyone keep leaving [the band]?!". They soon remember drummer Eddy Thrower from We Stare at Mirrors. They called him, asking he if would like to partake in a practice session. Thrower, who was unhappy with his time at university and with the band he was in, accepted the offer. Thrower fit in quickly, resulting in the trio writing "Far Q". Duce explained the band "never worked with a good drummer before. [With Thrower, i]t was... nice." Duce and Sansom previously created demos with programmed drums. Thrower initially learned the songs as they were but began changing the drum parts after a few practices. He used a double bass pedal for a lot of fills.

Far Q was recorded in a room above a printing factory in Hertfordshire between September and October 2009. The band were originally supposed to be on tour during September and October, but had to cancel plans when their bass player left. The album was produced by Daniel Lancaster, who also engineered and mixed it. (Note: Lancaster would later work with the band on Lower Than Atlantis (2014), which he produced and mixed.) The band had known Lancaster since they formed. Lancaster would constantly push Thrower to get a good drum sound to the extent where he was screaming in Thrower's face. Duce played bass on the album while Lancaster has guest vocals on "A/S/L?". The album was mastered by Alan Douches at West West Side Music in New Windsor, New York in November.

== Release ==
On 14 February 2010, "I'm Not Bulimic (I Just Wanted to See How Far I Could Stick My Fingers Down My Throat)" was made available for streaming via the band's Myspace profile. The music video for "Taping Songs Off the Radio" was released on 17 February, and the song released as a single on 1 March with "I'm Not Bulimic (I Just Wanted to See How Far I Could Stick My Fingers Down My Throat)" as the B-side. Far Q was released on 29 March 2010 through independent label A Wolf at Your Door Records. German label Redfield released a mediabook edition of the CD and a vinyl version of the album; the mediabook was limited to 1,000 copies while the vinyl was limited to 500 copies. The album's artwork was created by Alex Gregory and Jon Bamby. The pair also contributed the design, while Gregory provided photography and Bamby did the layout. Due to their frequent line-up changes in the past, the band's initial plan was to have temporary bass players. However, shortly after the release of Far Q, Declan Hart joined the group.

Hart, who was a guitarist at the time, subsequently purchased a bass. Previously, the band frequently gave Hart a lift to places. Duce explained, Hart "would show up, drink all our rider and get wasted. We were like, 'We like this guy!'" Around this time, the group were having problems with their label. Hart explained: "They didn't understand us or what we were doing. We had a punk ethic". In addition, the members quit their jobs and began to focus on the band full-time. Lower Than Atlantis supported I Am Ghost on their tour of the UK in May. The band toured the UK between June and August. The music video for "Far Q" was released on 6 July, and the single was released on 19 July with "Mike Duce's Symphony No.11 in D Minor" as the B-side. The band toured with TRC on the This Is England Tour in September. The band toured the UK as part of Rock Sound Presents... Powered by Fender tour in September and October, alongside Architects, Norma Jean and Devil Sold His Soul. Rock Sound predicted the band's popularity would increase following the tour.

As part of their 2019 3-date farewell tour, the band released 300 limited edition vinyl pressings of the album (100 per night).

== Reception and legacy ==
Professional ratings
Review scores
Source	Rating
Alter the Press!	3/5
Clash	Favorable
Dead Press!	7/10 stars
The Line of Best Fit	Favourable
Ox-Fanzine	8/10 stars
Rock Sound	8/10
Thrash Hits	3/6

Far Q was critically acclaimed upon release. Alter the Press! reviewer Sean Reid said Far Q was the band's attempt at standing out in a big pool of other UK hardcore bands. Reid noted that the album is "Filled with energy and passion" from the beginning and are able to show their honesty with "social[ly]-aware lyrics". He mentioned that the band have a good balance of "hardcore brutality" and good melodies. Johnskibeat of The Line of Best Fit noted that the album is inspired by "90′s grunge, rock and punk-pop bands" and that the band have a strong habit of "ting dirty, aggressive music". Johnskibeat said the album follows a "re-energised" band "delving into the gritty subjects of recession, unemployment and a disenchanted youth." Tomas Doyle of Thrash Hits said he was unable to "fully enjoy this record", regardless of the "musical proficiency," due to the lyrics being "THAT bad."

Reviewing the album for Rock Sound, reviewer Richard Cartey said the band's "maturity [went] beyond expectations". Cartey noted that pushing melodic hardcore's boundaries in terms of music and lyrics helps the album's appeal. Cartey also said that Duce's vocals fit "perfectly" to the material. Tristan Parker of Clash said the band managed to create "very worthy, out-and-out gritty rock" album, complete with "pleasingly jagged riffs". Parker noted the "underlying technical complexity and [...] nice melodies" show off the band's "genuinely impressive musicianship".

Dead Press! featured it as number 13 on their best albums of the year list. In a Rock Sound interview in February 2011, Duce said that half of the material on the album was "blink-and-you'll-miss-it [moments]." Looking back in a Kerrang! interview in August 2011 Duce thought the album was "too personal" and likened the lyrics to "airing my dirty laundry". "Far Q" has since remained a staple of the band's live performances.

== Track listing ==
All music written and arranged by Lower Than Atlantis. All lyrics by Michael Duce.

1. "Far Q" – 4:12
2. "B.O.R.E.D" – 1:50
3. "Taping Songs Off the Radio" – 2:50
4. "I'm Not Bulimic (I Just Wanted to See How Far I Could Stick My Fingers Down My Throat)" – 4:47
5. "Eating Is Cheating" – 3:22
6. "No Belts" – 3:37
7. "Face Full of Scars" – 3:24
8. "A/S/L?" – 2:39
9. "Down with the Kids" – 3:48
10. "Yo Music Scene, What Happened?" – 3:19
11. "Mike Duce's Symphony No.11 in D Minor" – 3:09
12. "Extra! Extra! Read All About It!" – 3:30

== Personnel ==
Personnel per booklet.

Lower Than Atlantis

- Mike Duce – vocals, guitar, bass guitar
- Ben Sansom – guitar
- Eddy Thrower – drums

Additional musician

- Daniel Lancaster – guest vocals on "A/S/L?"

Production

- Daniel Lancaster – producer, engineer, mixing
- Alan Douches – mastering
- Alex Gregory, Jon Bamby – artwork concept, design
- Alex Gregory – photography
- Jon Bamby – layout
