= Bretton (EP) =

EP by Lower Than Atlantis
- Released: 18 October 2008
- Recorded: 2008, The Pill Studios, Newport
- Genre: Hardcore punk
- Length: 19:44
- Label: Small Town
- Producer: Matt Tuck

Lower Than Atlantis chronology
Demo 2007 (2007)	Bretton (2008)	Far Q (2010)

Bretton is the first EP by the British rock band Lower Than Atlantis, released in 2008.

== Background and production ==
Lower Than Atlantis formed in August 2007 in Watford, while the members were attending college. Guitarist Ben Sansom asked guitarist Mike Duce if he wished to form a band with Ben's brother Luke, who would provide vocals. Alongside them was bassist Richard Wilkinson and drummer Matt Britz. In April 2008, the group signed to Small Town Records, with whom they were aiming to release their forthcoming EP through. Following line-up changes, such as the addition of drummer Joshua Pickett, bassist Stephen Minter, and Duce becoming the band's frontman, they began working on what would become their first EP, Bretton.

All of the songs on Bretton were written by Lower Than Atlantis, with lyrics by Duce and Luke Sansom. Duce taught himself how to sing and play guitar at the same time while playing along to the band's Demo 2007 release. Pickett had been playing the drums for eight years, naming Abe Cunningham from Deftones as a main inspiration. However, Matt Britz had written and recorded the drum parts for Bretton. Jeff and Ginge recorded the EP at The Pill Studios in Newport. Matt Tuck produced all of the proceedings. Tom Woodstock mastered the EP at The Roof Studios.

== Release and reception ==
Bretton was released on 18 October 2008 through Small Town Records, before being released through Thirty Days of Night on 19 December 2008. The artwork was done by Liam Flaherty Design. A music video was filmed for "The Juggernaut", it was directed by Daniel Seecharan. It was shot on a low budget. The band spent a lot of 2009 supporting the EP. Partway through the touring cycle for the EP, the band had several line-up changes, eventually leaving them with only vocalist/guitarist Mike Duce and guitarist Ben Sansom.

Big Cheese magazine called the band "pissed off [and] energetic" while they "channel[ed] the dirty chugging riffs of Southern rock". They claimed that "Rock 'n roll-infused post-hardcore just got some new superheroes." Reviewing for Rhythm, Chris Barnes called the EP "a monster of technical music" with "low-slung grooves, odd time and intense riffs." In a retrospective review, Ben Patashnik of Rock Sound described the EP's sound as "youthful, jagged hardcore", bearing "little resemblance" to the band's later material. Concluding with the band's "wit shone through the short, sharp blasts of noise."

== Track listing ==
All songs written by Lower Than Atlantis. All lyrics written by Mike Duce and Luke Sansom.

1. "March of the LTA" – 0:58
2. "Frankie Goes to Hemel" – 2:56
3. "The Juggernaut" – 3:14
4. "Sleeping in the Bath" – 3:11
5. "Bretton" – 2:40
6. "I Hate Comic Sans" – 0:24
7. "What a Beautiful Day to Impersonate an Officer" – 2:56
8. "Vampires Suck, Blood" – 3:25

== Personnel ==
Personnel per booklet.

Lower Than Atlantis

- Mike Duce – guitar, vocals
- Ben Sansom – guitar
- Stephen Minter – bass guitar
- Josh Pickett – drums

Production

- Matt Britz – recording drums
- Jeff and Ginge – recording
- Matt Tuck – producer
- Tom Woodstock – mastering
- Liam Fiaherty Design – CD artwork, art direction
