= Dial Tone (disambiguation) =

dial tone is a tone on a phone indicating that the line is operational

- Dial Tone (G.I. Joe)
- Dial Tones, fictional band in Happy Days (musical)
- "Dial Tones", song by As It Is from the album Never Happy, Ever After
- “Dialtone”, track from the Deltarune Chapter 2 OST
