= As It Is (band) =

British-American rock band

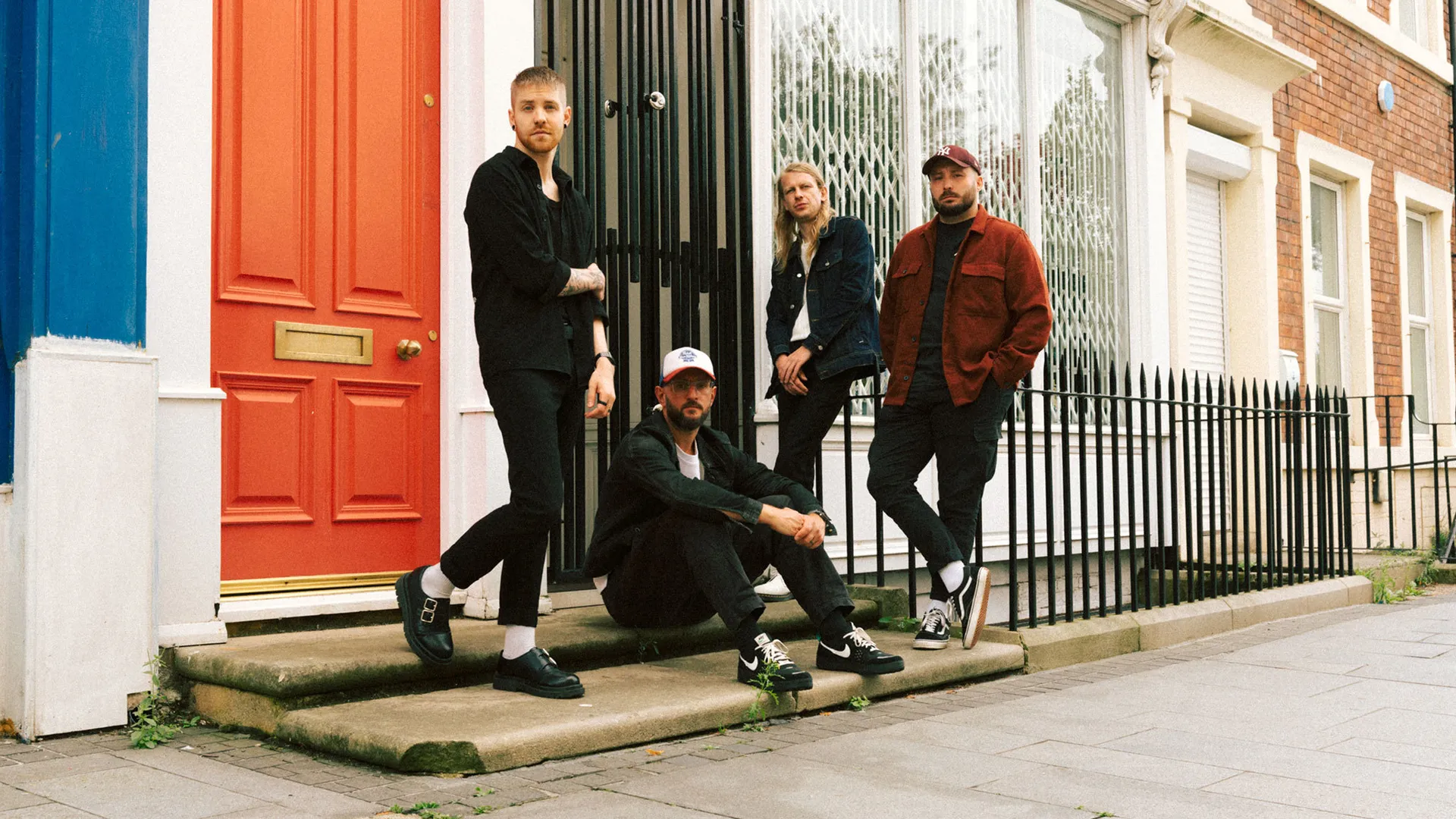

Background information
- Origin: Brighton, England, UK
- Genres: Pop-punk; emo; pop rock; post-hardcore
- Years active: 2012–2022; 2024–present
- Labels: FLG; Slam Dunk; Fearless
- Members: Patty Walters; Benjamin Biss; Patrick Foley; Alistair Testo
- Past members: Ronnie Ish; James Fox; Andy Westhead
- Website: asitisofficial.com
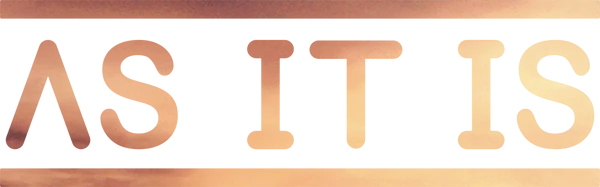

As It Is (often stylised as ΛS IT IS or Λ\\) are a British-American rock band based in Brighton, England. The band was formed in 2012, and signed to Fearless Records in 2014. Following a hiatus, they reunited under Slam Dunk Records.

The band has released seven extended plays and six studio albums. The debut album, Never Happy, Ever After, was released by Fearless Records in April 2015; the second album, okay., was released in January 2017; the third album, The Great Depression, was released in August 2018; and the band's latest album, I Went to Hell and Back, was released in February 2022. By September, the band had entered a hiatus, with their disbandment being officially announced in January 2024. In August 2024, the group announced a reunion for 2025 consisting of Foley, Biss, Testo and Walters.

== History ==
=== Formation and Never Happy, Ever After (2012–2016) ===
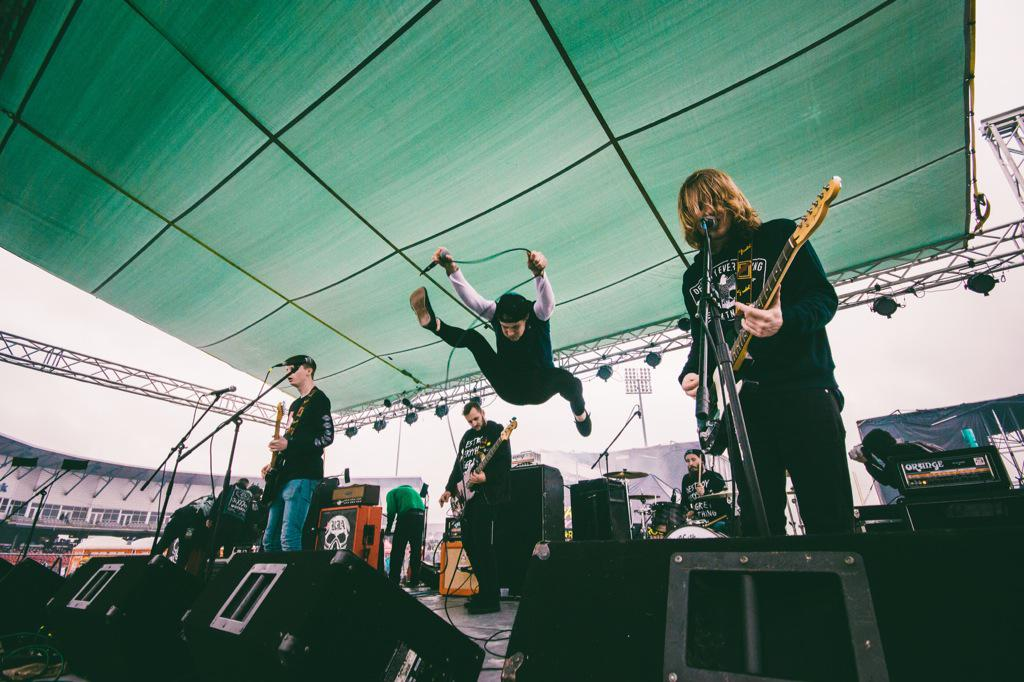
As It Is performing in 2015

As It Is was formed in spring 2012 by Minnesota-born Patrick Walters, who posted an advertisement stating that he was looking for musicians to be in a pop-punk band using the online service Join My Band. Andrew Westhead and Patrick Foley replied to the advertisement and were accepted into the band along with Benjamin Biss, who Walters knew from university. The band's name comes from a lyric in a song by the American straight edge hardcore band Have Heart.

Walters began his own career by posting song covers on his personal YouTube channel. After the band's formation, the band as a whole worked on a cover of Fat Lip by Sum 41. As the band's career started to gain more traction, he posted less often until he finally announced in the video, titled "A New Chapter", that he would go on an undetermined hiatus for the channel and would be focusing his efforts on As It Is. He has since made clear that he has no intention of returning to YouTube.

In early 2014 they added bassist Alistair Testo, The band played local shows for the first couple of years before their first few tours shortly after releasing their fourth EP This Mind of Mine, touring the UK and Europe. The band received a large response from these tours and signed to Fearless Records in October 2014, becoming the first UK band to sign to the label. The band members began working on the group's debut full-length album in 2014 in Florida with producer James Paul Wisner.

The band's debut full-length, Never Happy, Ever After was released on 20 April 2015 in Europe and the following day in the United States under Fearless Records. Three singles were released from the album, "Dial Tones", "Concrete" and "Cheap Shots & Setbacks".

The band performed at every date on the 2015 edition of Warped Tour. The band performed at the 2015 Reading and Leeds Festivals in the United Kingdom.

=== okay., line-up changes, and The Great Depression (2017–2020) ===
Their second album, okay., was released on 20 January 2017.

In October 2017, Westhead departed from the band due to "feelings and differences [that] had been building up."

The band recorded their third record in Texas in January 2018, and started teasing new music in May with cryptic messages on their social media accounts.

They released their third album, The Great Depression, on 10 August 2018, which included the singles "The Wounded World", "The Stigma (Boys Don't Cry)", and "The Reaper".

They were approached by Hopeless Records to be a part of the label's new annual compilation album series titled Songs That Saved My Life, a series in which bands cover a song that had a significant impact on them as a whole or individually. The song that As It Is chose was Such Great Heights, which was originally made famous by the indie rock band The Postal Service. The album was released on 9 November 2018. Lead singer Patty Walters was also interviewed by Hopeless Records as a part of a campaign to get kids and teens to seek out help if they are going through personal struggles, which was also the overall message of the album.

At their show at the 02 Forum Kentish Town in London on 1 December 2018, the unofficial world record for the most crowd surfers during an hour-long was set. Over 300 people crowd surfed during the band's set, and over 600 crowd surfed across the sets of all four bands on the bill.

The success of The Great Depression prompted an additional release, The Great Depression: Reimagined, in which the band interpolated and re-adapted the original songs into new genres and sounds across a series of multiple EPs mimicking the stages laid out on the original release. The album was released in its entirety on 8 November 2019.

On Monday 9 September 2019 As It Is announced on their social media that Benjamin Langford-Biss would be leaving the band, the band announced an 11 date European farewell tour, supported by Southampton punk rockers Miss Vincent, to pay tribute to his departure.

On Tuesday 29 December 2020, As It Is announced on twitter that drummer Patrick Foley would be leaving the band to pursue a new career as a firefighter.

=== I Went to Hell and Back and hiatus (2021–2024) ===
On 27 May 2021, the band released their first single as a trio titled "IDGAF", followed by "I Lie to Me" on 5 August, "ILY, How Are You?" and "IDC, I Can't Take It" on 3 September, "I Miss 2003" on 11 November, and "In Threes" on 9 December. The release of "I Miss 2003" came along with the announcement of the band's fourth album I Went to Hell and Back which released 4 February 2022 by Fearless Records.

On Tuesday, 23 August 2022, bassist Alistair Testo announced he would be leaving the band. Following Testo's departure, As It Is played that year's Reading and Leeds Festivals as a three-piece with touring musician Ross Brown returning on drums. These turned out to be their final shows before indefinite hiatus.

In January 2024, Patty Walters announced the group's hiatus through a rare Instagram post, stating "Here's to another new chapter. It's never goodbye. It's just 'see you around'", quoting his previous hiatus as a former YouTube content creator.

=== Reunion and Self-titled fifth album (2025–present) ===
In August of 2024, the band's social media accounts were wiped and rebranded as "Transatlantic pop-punk. Sellouts since 2012" with a link to a new website that hinted at a reunion. On 2 September 2024, a reunion of their best-known lineup including Walters, Biss, Foley, and Testo was announced, with plans to return in 2025. The band released Never Happy Ever After X on 18 April 2025, a re-record of their debut album Never Happy Ever After, featuring artists such as Holding Absence, Kellin Quinn, and Noahfinnce. That same year, it was announced As It Is would be playing the Orlando, Florida date of the 2025 Vans Warped Tour. On 10 September 2025, As It Is released their first single in seven years with their original lineup (minus Andy), titled "Lose Your Way & Find Yourself". Coinciding with the release of the single, the band announced their signing with the label FLG. On 7 January 2026, they released the single "Ruin My Life" featuring Murray Macleod of The Xcerts. On 10 January 2026, the band announced their self titled album, which is set to be released on 17 July 2026. On 12 March, they released the single "Marilyn", followed by "Do You Remember" on 7 May, and "Live, Laugh, Love, Los Angeles" on 6 June. On 24th July As It Is, the album, was confirmed as the number 1 independent album on the official UK album charts for that week.

== Style and influences ==
As It Is has been described as a pop-punk band with a "melodic, earnest, emo-inspired" sound, compared to the early material of Taking Back Sunday, The Starting Line, All Time Low, Silverstein, Underoath, My Chemical Romance, Rise Against, and AFI. The Wonder Years has been listed as a big influence. Their early material on Never Happy, Ever After has been described as more emo-pop punk. Their sophomore album okay. falls under a lot of similar genres to their debut, but notably does have a few songs on it that stand out as very different from previous work. Overtime, their styles have been considered more diverse on their later work, exploring more of the themes seen on okay. by taking a notable stylistic departure into darker territory on The Great Depression.

They have cited influences including Hundred Reasons, Finch, From First to Last, Allister, the Early November, New Found Glory, Mayday Parade, Silverstein, Hidden in Plain View, Taking Back Sunday, My Chemical Romance, Paramore, Panic! at the Disco, Fall Out Boy, the Cure, Sum 41, Jimmy Eat World, Blink-182 and Green Day.

== Band members ==
Current

- Patty Walters – vocals, guitar (2012–2022, 2024–present), drums, percussion (2020–2022), bass (2022)
- Ben Biss – guitar, vocals (2012–2019, 2024–present)
- Patrick Foley – drums, percussion (2012–2020, 2024–present)
- Ali Testo – bass, backing vocals (2012–2022, 2024–present)

Former

- Ronnie Ish – guitar, backing vocals (2018–2022; touring member 2018)
- James Fox – bass, backing vocals (2012–2013)
- Andy Westhead – lead guitar, backing vocals (2012–2017)

Touring

- Maxx Danziger – drums (2021)
- Ross Brown – drums (2022)

== Discography ==
=== Studio albums ===
List of studio albums, with selected chart positions
Title	Album details	Peak chart positions				
Title	Album details	UK	US	SCO	UK Indie	UK Physical
Never Happy, Ever After	Released: 20 April 2015; Label: Fearless (FRL302082); Format: CD, DL, LP	39	159	40	7	52
okay.	Released: 20 January 2017; Label: Fearless (FEAR00137); Format: CD, DL, LP	48	—	47	-	40
The Great Depression	Released: 10 August 2018; Label: Fearless; Format: CD, CS, DL, LP	29	198	38	-	15
I Went to Hell and Back	Released: 4 February 2022; Label: Fearless; Format: CD, DL, LP	—	—	40	-	31
Never Happy, Ever After X	Released: 17 April 2025; Label: Slam Dunk Records; Format: CD, CS, DL, LP	—	—	75	23	71
As It Is	Released: 17 July 2026; Label: FLG; Format: CD, CS, DL, LP	76	—	38	1	8

=== Extended plays ===
List of extended plays
Title	EP details
Two Track	Released: 28 May 2012; Label: Self-released; Format: DL
Blenheim Place	Released: 15 April 2013; Label: Self-released; Format: DL
Blenheim Place Acoustic	Released: 21 October 2013; Label: Self-released; Format: DL
This Mind of Mine (Note: Pressed on vinyl through Mutant League in November 2014.)	Released: 9 March 2014; Label: Self-released; Format: CD, DL, 7" vinyl
Denial: Reimagined	Released: 1 March 2019; Label: Fearless; Format: CD, 7", DL
Anger: Reimagined	Released: 24 May 2019; Label: Fearless; Format: CD, 7", DL
Bargaining: Reimagined	Released: 23 August 2019; Label: Fearless; Format: CD, 7", DL

=== Compilation appearances ===
Title	Original artist	Album	Label	Year released
"The Only Exception"	Paramore	Rock Sound Presents: Worships and Tributes	Rock Sound	2015
"She"	Green Day	Green Day: American Superhits!	Kerrang!	2016
"Such Great Heights"	The Postal Service	Songs That Saved My Life	Hopeless/Sub City	2018
"Drown"	Bring Me the Horizon	Rock Sound: Worship and Tributes: Volume II	Rock Sound	2019
"Okay"	As It Is	Punk Goes Acoustic Vol. 3	Fearless	2019

=== Compilations ===
Title	Details
A Decade Uneventful: B-Sides and Rarities (2012-2022)	Released: 20 November 2024; Label: Slam Dunk Records; Format: CD, DL, LP

=== Singles ===
List of singles, showing year released and album name
Title	Year	Album
"Dial Tones"	2015	Never Happy, Ever After
"Cheap Shots & Setbacks"	2015	Never Happy, Ever After
"Concrete"	2015	Never Happy, Ever After
"Okay"	2016	Okay.
"Pretty Little Distance"	2016	Okay.
"No Way Out"	2016	Okay.
"The Wounded World"	2018	The Great Depression
"The Stigma (Boys Don't Cry)"	2018	The Great Depression
"The Reaper"	2018	The Great Depression
"Soap 2020"	2020	Non-Album Single
"IDGAF"	2021	I Went to Hell and Back
"I Lie to Me"	2021	I Went to Hell and Back
"ILY, How Are You?"	2021	I Went to Hell and Back
"IDC, I Can't Take It"	2021	I Went to Hell and Back
"I Miss 2003"	2021	I Went to Hell and Back
"In Threes"	2021	I Went to Hell and Back
"Dial Tones X (feat. Holding Absence)"	2025	Never Happy, Ever After X
"Sorry X (feat. Yours Truly)"	2025	Never Happy, Ever After X
"Can't Save Myself X (feat. NOAHFINNCE)"	2025	Never Happy, Ever After X
"Cheap Shots & Setbacks X (feat. Mallory Knox & Roam)"	2025	Never Happy, Ever After X
"Lose Your Way & Find Yourself"	2025	As It Is
"Ruin My Life"	2026	As It Is
"Marilyn"	2026	As It Is

=== Music videos ===
List of music videos, showing year released and director
Title	Year	Director
"Upswing"	2013	Ellie Mitchell
"Can't Save Myself"	2014	Ian Coulson
"Dial Tones"	2015	Chris Porter
"Cheap Shots & Setbacks"	2015	Dan Centrone
"Speak Soft"	2015	LifeIsArtVisuals
"Winter's Weather"	2016	Ian Coulson
"Pretty Little Distance"	2016	Joshua Halling
"Okay"	2016	
"Hey Rachel"	2017	Joshua Halling
"No Way Out"	2017	Joshua Halling
"The Wounded World"	2018	Our World Is Grey
"The Stigma (Boys Don't Cry)"	2018	Our World Is Grey
"The Reaper"	2018	Zak Pinchin
"The Fire, The Dark"	2019	Ian Coulson
"IDGAF"	2021	Ian Coulson
"ILY, How Are You?"	2021	Alex Bemis
"IDC, I Can't Take It"	2021	Alex Bemis
"I Miss 2003"	2021	Ian Coulson
"I Hate Me Too"	2022	Cody Blue
"Lose Your Way & Find Yourself"	2025	Zak Pinchin
"Ruin My Life"	2026	Ian Coulson
"Marilyn"	2026	

== Festivals ==
- Vans Warped Tour 2015 (US)
- Slam Dunk Festival 2015 (UK)
- Reading and Leeds 2015 (UK)
- Slam Dunk Festival 2018 (UK)
- Vans Warped Tour 2018 (US)
- Slam Dunk Festival 2019 (UK)
- Jera On Air Festival 2019 (NL)
- 2000 Trees Festival 2019 (UK)
- Gunnersville Concert Series 2019 (UK)
- Slam Dunk Festival 2025 (UK)
- Vans Warped Tour 2025 (USA)
- Burn It Down 2026 (UK)
- Download Festival 2026 (UK)
