= Bears in Trees =

English indie rock band

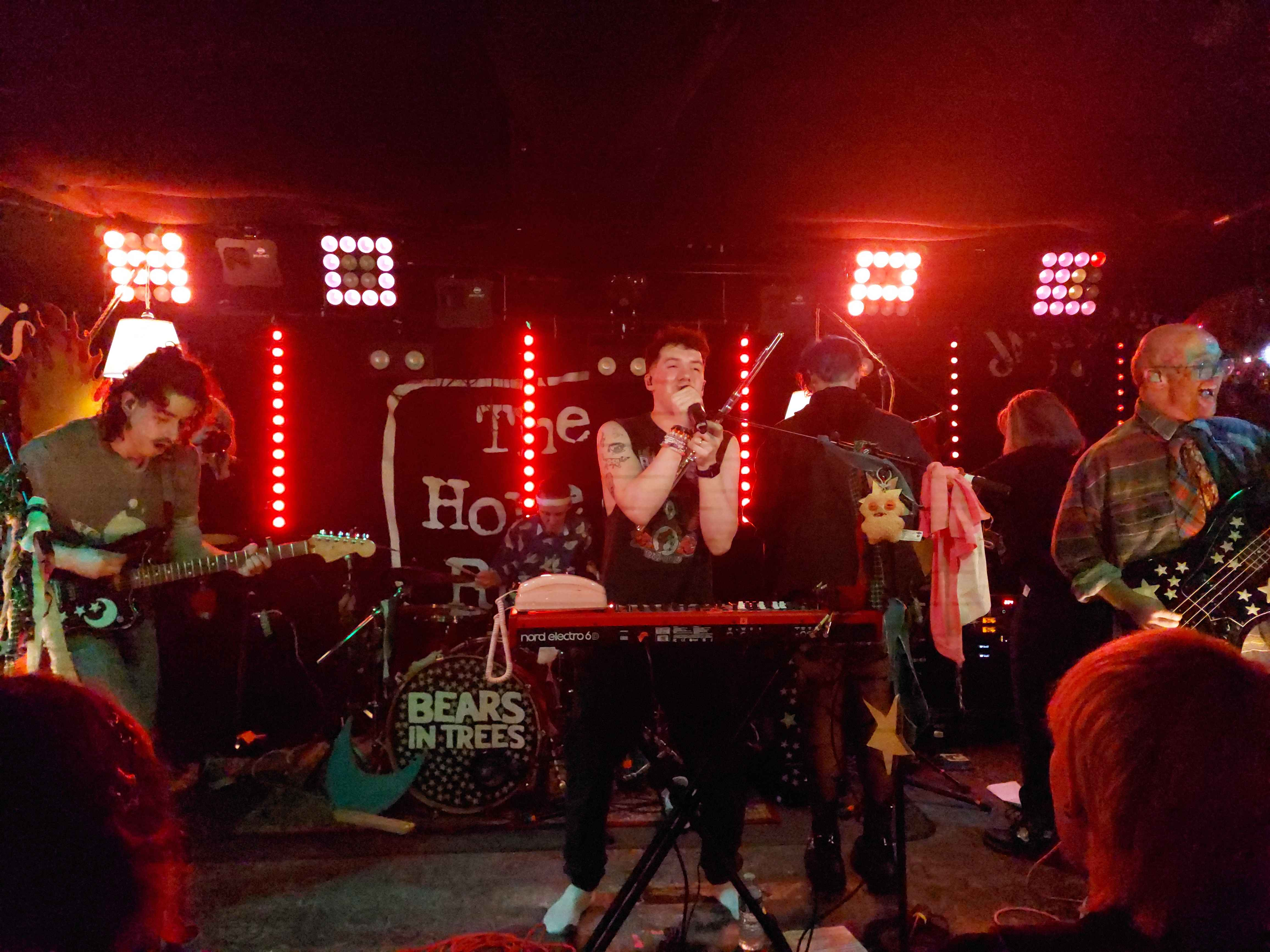
- Bears in Trees performing at the Hope & Ruin, Brighton in 2026. Left to right: Nick Peters, George Berry, Callum Litchfield, two audience members, Iain Gillespie.

Background information
- Origin: Croydon, South London, England
- Genres: Indie rock, emo, pop rock
- Years active: 2014–present
- Labels: Bearberry Records (independent, previous), Counter Intuitive Records (previous), I Sure Hope It Does (independent)
- Members: Iain Gillespie; Callum Litchfield; Nicholas "Nick" Peters; George Berry
- Website: bearsintrees.com

Bears in Trees are an English indie rock band from Croydon, South London, England. The group consists of bassist and vocalist Iain Gillespie, drummer George Berry, vocalist Callum Litchfield and guitarist Nicholas "Nick" Peters. The band rejects traditional genre labels, dubbing themselves a 'dirtbag boyband.'

In October 2020, Bears in Trees signed to Boston label Counter Intuitive Records, releasing their debut studio album and everybody else smiled back on the label in 2021. However, the band subsequently went independent with their 2024 album How to Build an Ocean: Instructions after rejecting a "major record label deal."

== History ==
=== 2014–2015: Formation and Let's Sleep On It ===
Callum Litchfield, Iain Gillespie and Nick Peters attended the same all-boys Catholic secondary school, which they have since described as "intolerant and outdated". Primary school friends, Litchfield and Gillespie, befriended Peters after discovering their mutual love for Fall Out Boy. Alongside another friend from school, the trio went on to form pop-punk band The November Criminals. The band's EP Laughing Gas Smile was recorded with the help of George Berry, a college acquaintance of Litchfield.

Following the dissolution of The November Criminals in late 2014, Litchfield, Gillespie, Peters and Berry decided to form Bears in Trees. They had initially struggled to find a suitable band name, going through names such as 'Royal Jellyfish' before settling on an adapted version of the name 'Bears in Submarines', suggested to them by a band name generator.

The newly-formed band wrote and released their first project in September 2015, a collection of ten songs entitled Let's Sleep on It. Their first shows were played in libraries and car parks. Initially, the band members switched instruments for each song, but they settled on Berry as the drummer and producer, Gillespie as the bassist and Peters as the guitarist. Gillespie and Litchfield were established as the band's lead vocalists, with Litchfield also playing most of the other instruments used by the band, such as the ukulele and keys. Lyrics were written by both Gillespie and Peters, with the first song to feature Peters' lyrics being the now Bandcamp-exclusive 'Nick's Wild Night In'.

=== 2016–2019: University, Just Five More Minutes, Bits n' Pieces and I See Blue ===
Following the release of Let's Sleep On It, in 2015, the members moved to different cities in England to attend university. This gave the band less time to work on music, and decreased the frequency of their performances. Whilst at university, the band released the EP Ugh! What Time Is It? (2016), containing early versions of tracks that would feature on their debut album Just Five More Minutes (2017). Just Five More Minutes' release was preceded by the pre-release single "Good Rhymes for Bad Times". They also released a collection of short interludes entitled Bits n' Pieces (2017), as well as the singles "Fly Out To Alaska" (2018) and "Sitting Pretty" (2019). 'Fly Out To Alaska' was recorded during a trip to Vienna, in Audioheart Studios. They filmed a music video for the single to document their time there. Austrian slang is included in a call-and-response section of the song; Nah oida! Leiwand! roughly translates to "hey man! It's cool!"

In August 2019, the band released EP I See Blue. The song "I Am Cold", from I See Blue, contains repeated references to Peters' favourite book, Catch-22. Much of their work from the period of 2016–2019 reflected their growth and experiences they faced at university. In 2019, the band members returned to their hometown of Croydon together.

=== 2019–2020: I Want To Feel Chaotic, Keep Me Safe and signing to Counter Intuitive Records ===
In 2019 the band began work on their next project: companion EPs I Want To Feel Chaotic and Keep Me Safe. These EPs would be released in 2020, releasing one song from the EP as a single each month over the COVID-19 lockdowns in the UK. I Want To Feel Chaotic is said to be about "coming to terms with the worst parts of your personality—with the things that scare you, with the things that keep you awake at night… with the deaths of your friends, and the slow acceptance that you are deserving of love." Several of the songs in this project were inspired by the death of Gillespie's close friend, including lead single 'Ramblings of a Lunatic', which would go on to become the band's most streamed song on Spotify as of March 2026.

The band also began posting short videos to video sharing platform TikTok in 2020, partly to promote their own music. Jake Sulzer of independent record label Counter Intuitive Records watched one of these TikToks and decided to sign Bears in Trees. The EP releases of I Want To Feel Chaotic and Keep Me Safe were their first releases under Counter Intuitive Records.

=== 2021–2022: Flower Through Concrete and and everybody else smiled back ===
The double-A side single Flower Through Concrete was released on 14 May 2021 via Counter Intuitive Records. It featured the band's first professionally produced music video, for "Fresh Concrete", directed by Rakesh Jaitly. In July 2021, following the release of Flower Through Concrete, the band embarked on their first UK headline tour. They would release their debut studio album and everybody else smiled back on 19 November 2021, preceded by singles 'Great Heights', 'I'm Doing Push Ups' and 'Little Cellist'. Each pre-release single was accompanied by a music video; the "Little Cellist" music video was directed by Jamie Benyon and is their first video not to show the band. and everybody else smiled back has been described by the band as "a house party at the end of the world", and discusses the band's experiences through university and early adulthood. In 2022 the band played several tours and festivals, including their first US tour supporting Just Friends, and their first headline US tour, supported by Chase Petra and Cry Baby.

=== 2022–2023: Every Moonbeam Every Feverdream, How To Stay Shining and rejection of major-label deal ===
In the summer of 2022, the band was contacted by a "major record label" looking to potentially make them an offer after seeing them play live. The band released single "Precipitation" on 2 June 2022, and their final release under Counter Intuitive Records, EP Every Moonbeam Every Feverdream, on 11 November 2022. Every Moonbeam Every Feverdream was preceded by singles "Kind Love" and "Doing This Again!". The description of the music video for "Doing This Again!" mentions that the band opted to record and edit it themselves on a compact camera reminiscent of their earlier music videos, as opposed to the more professional music videos they had produced since the release of Fresh Concrete. The song "Simply Won't Believe It" features a reference to the 2019 video game Outer Wilds. The band described the EP as being about "walks under street lamps and goodbyes and nights spent quiet after days that won't end, moonlight, and those days where you wish you didn't have a body."

Despite headlining several festivals and playing many different shows throughout 2022, the major record label they had previously received an offer from did not come to see the band play live. In mid-2023, the label made them an offer: the rights to their next album in perpetuity as well as 80% of its profits. On 7 June 2023 the band rejected this offer, deciding to release their next projects independently. In the remainder of 2023 the band released singles "Cassiopeia", "Apathy is Boring" and "Bart's Bike", referring to these three singles as an 'era' named How To Stay Shining, and released single 'No Point Pretending (Song For Tour)' as a collaboration with artist NOAHFINNCE. They also released before you got here as a paid exclusive EP, as part of a raffle allowing winners to receive prizes such Bears in Trees memorabilia and lifetime tickets. before you got here was said to be "an EP breathing new life into old songs".

They would later embark on a US tour alongside NOAHFINNCE and Action/Adventure, as well as joining You Me at Six's Truth Decay tour as a support act alongside The Maine and Waterparks. The tour alongside You Me At Six remains the largest tour they have played as of 2025.

=== 2024: How To Build An Ocean: Instructions ===
The band began teasing their second studio album, How to Build an Ocean: Instructions, in January 2024, wiping their Instagram page and creating an alternate reality game (ARG) for fans to solve in order to find the name of the album. The lead single of this album, 'Things That Look Like Mistakes', was released the same month. The album was released on 26 April 2024, and reached a peak position of #1 in the UK Independent Album Breakers Chart, as well as a position of 64 on the UK Albums Chart. The album title was inspired by Flights by Olga Tokarczuk and deals with identity and mapping; mapping of the self and the future. They played a headline tour in the UK and their first EU shows alongside The Happy Fits, with support from Lexie Carroll for the UK leg of the tour and Walking on Rivers for the EU leg.

=== 2025–present: Success Is Unlikely, Success Is Monumental and I See Blue remake ===
After facing extreme burnout in 2024 from the pressures of an intense touring schedule and being full-time musicians, the band returned to being self-managed from the beginning of 2025, taking up day jobs alongside their work in the band. They found that no longer having the band as a full-time career allowed the time they did spend working for the band to feel more novel and intentional. They began recording their next project, Success Is Unlikely, describing the new era as "everything to us. Nothing has felt as urgent or as cathartic or as needed as this." Single 'Left, Right, Goodnight!' was the first to be released from this project on 1 May 2025, followed by singles 'No Love, No Heartbreak', 'Some Character Development' and 'Heard it in a Dream' later in the year. The project was released as an EP on 20 November 2025. The band recorded a cover of Twenty One Pilots' 'We Don't Believe What's On TV', for UK music magazine Rock Sound's 10 year tribute album to Blurryface, Blurryface Reborn. They also released single 'Incredible Speed' for Counter Intuitive Records' 10 year anniversary collection.

On 1 January 2026, the band announced the companion EP to Success Is Unlikely, named Success Is Monumental, to be released on 12 February. Its first single, 'Large Hadron Collider', was released the same day. followed by 'You're The Only Ten I See', '(I Don't Have) Trauma' and 'We Drop A Stitch Sometimes' in the following weeks.

Initially framing it as an April Fool’s Day joke, the band announced their “new EP” I See Blue on 1 April 2026, with lead single “Life’s A Beach” to release on 4 April. It was revealed several hours later that they would be re-recording and releasing their 2019 EP of the same name, as well as producing I See Blue vinyls. A sixth track named "Caffeine and Bad Decisions", which the band started writing in 2016, was finalised and added to the re-released EP.

== Musical influences ==
Bears in Trees' music is difficult to class as any single genre, as the four members have highly distinct tastes in music that they draw inspiration from. In an interview with Artefact Magazine in 2020, Gillespie mentioned that they were inspired by "early emo like Fall Out Boy and Modern Baseball," as well as "folk music [...] like The Front Bottoms and Ramshackle Glory," Berry mentioned taking inspiration from "indie-pop, that kind of background like The Wombats,” whilst Peters explained that he liked "the traditional band sort-of thing, with a mixture of the electronic elements," and that Litchfield drew from "pure pop music".

Much of Bears in Trees' work, especially Let's Sleep On It, is inspired by the emo and pop-punk scene, as Gillespie and Peters bonded over a shared love of pop-punk music. They later introduced Litchfield to the genre. Litchfield mentions that the first pop-punk song he enjoyed was 'Oh Well, Oh Well', from Mayday Parade's self-titled album.

In a 2024 interview with Square One Magazine, the band outlined the origins of their individual interests in music. Gillespie described falling in love with music after discovering artists such as Paramore and Fall Out Boy through video game Guitar Hero. Peters mentioned the children's karaoke machine he received as a child, which he used to perform covers of songs from children's cartoon Bob the Builder, whilst Berry mentioned playing rhythms on saucepans as a child, sparking his interest in drumming. Litchfield traced his love for music back to receiving the album A Present for Everyone by pop-punk band Busted as a Christmas present.

In terms of lyrics, Gillespie has mentioned that they are inspired by the scansion and rhyme structures present in grime and rap music, and has named Jme's 'Man Don't Care' as a song that has influenced them, stating that one of the lyrics "blew [their] mind when [they] heard it."

== Band members ==
- George Berry – drums, percussion, producer
- Iain Gillespie – vocals, bass guitar, lyrics
- Callum Litchfield – vocals, ukulele, piano, keytar, triangle, flute
- Nicholas "Nick" Peters – guitar, banjo, lyrics, backing vocals

== Discography ==
Logo of Bears in Trees

=== Albums ===
- Let's Sleep On It (2015) No longer available on streaming platforms; exclusively available on Bandcamp and SoundCloud.
- Just Five More Minutes (2017)
- and everybody else smiled back (2021)
- How to Build an Ocean: Instructions (2024)

=== EPs ===
- Ugh! What Time Is It? (2016, comprising early versions of tracks from Just Five More Minutes)
- I See Blue (2019)
- I Want To Feel Chaotic (2020, counterpart to Keep Me Safe)
- Keep Me Safe (2020, counterpart to I Want To Feel Chaotic)
- Every Moonbeam Every Feverdream (2022)
- before you got here (2023, paid exclusive EP of re-imagined older songs)
- Success Is Unlikely (2025, counterpart to Success Is Monumental)
- Success Is Monumental (2026, counterpart to Success Is Unlikely)
- I See Blue (2026, re-recording of the 2019 EP of the same name)

=== Collections ===
- Bits n' Pieces (2017)

=== Singles ===
- Nick's Wild Night In (2015, exclusive to Bandcamp and SoundCloud)
- A Song About the Weather (2015, exclusive to Bandcamp and SoundCloud)
- Fly Out To Alaska (2018)
- Sitting Pretty (2019)
- Flower Through Concrete (2021, double-A side single)
- Precipitation (2022)
- Cassiopeia (2023, counterpart to Apathy is Boring and Bart's Bike)
- Apathy is Boring (2023, counterpart to Cassiopeia and Bart's Bike)
- Bart's Bike (2023, counterpart to Cassiopeia and Apathy Is Boring)
- We Don't Believe What's on TV (2025, Twenty One Pilots cover for Blurryface Reborn, Rock Sound's ten-year anniversary Blurryface tribute album)
- Incredible Speed (2025, for Counter Intuitive Records's ten-year anniversary compilation, Counter Intuitive Presents: Cosmic Debris, Vol. 2)

== Tours ==
=== UK/EU tours ===
==== 2021 ====
Bears in Trees had their debut UK tour in mid-2021. The tour was originally due to take place in December 2020, but was postponed due to the COVID-19 pandemic. The band also toured the UK supporting NOAHFINNCE in September 2021.

==== 2022 ====
Their second UK tour took place in February 2022 with support from Lucy Blue, who toured alongside them. Bears in Trees also played a number of festivals in Summer 2022, headlining many. They embarked on their third UK tour, "The Moonbeam Tour", in November 2022, with support from Misery Kids and ME REX. They played "the smallest UK shows [they'll] play in a long time."

==== 2023 ====
Bears in Trees opened for You Me at Six on their "Truth Decay Tour" in February 2023, alongside Waterparks and The Maine. On 28 September 2023, Bears in Trees appeared as a "super secret guest" at a headlining show by Good Kid.

==== 2024 ====
Bears in Trees went on a UK/EU tour co-headlining with The Happy Fits in April/May 2024, coinciding with the release of their album "How To Build An Ocean: Instructions". During this tour Bears In Trees headlined in Birmingham, Newcastle, Glasgow, Manchester, Leeds, Bristol and London on the UK leg. Lexie Carroll also supported at these UK dates as the opening act. The European leg of the tour, which was headlined by The Happy Fits, visited Rotterdam, Ultrecht, Berlin, Hamburg, Köln and Antwerp. They were also supported by Walking On Rivers for this leg of the tour.

Bears in Trees went on the road again in August 2024 for The Seaside Tour, playing shows in Exeter, Southampton, Brighton, Blackpool, Hull and Cardiff, playing tracks from their most recent album "How To Build An Ocean: Instructions" as well as songs from throughout their discography that reference the seaside.

==== 2026 ====
In February 2026, Bears in Trees went on a UK tour named "Tour is Unlikely" alongside Soot Sprite, to support their EPs "Success Is Unlikely" and "Success Is Monumental". They played in London, Brighton, Leeds, Nottingham Glasgow, and Manchester. A European leg of the tour followed, marking their first headline European tour. Concerts were played in Paris, Brussels, 's-Hertogenbosch, Cologne and Hamburg.

They announced a second UK and Ireland tour alongside Dutch Criminal Record, taking place at the end of May and playing locations that they were unable to visit during the year's first tour.

A third, smaller tour was announced to take place in October, with the band playing two shows in the UK and three in the Netherlands, plus a sixth date in an undisclosed location. They would be playing songs from their upcoming third studio album.

=== North American tours ===
==== 2022 ====
Bears in Trees went on their first US tour in March 2022, when they supported Just Friends. Following the release of their EP "Every Moonbeam, Every Feverdream", they embarked on their first US headline tour, the Feverdream Tour, in November and December 2022, with support from Chase Petra and Cry Baby. They played shows in Toronto, Lakewood, Chicago, Detroit, Columbus, Philadelphia, Washington, Brooklyn and Boston.

==== 2023 ====
The band supported NOAHFINNCE on his second US tour in April 2023, alongside Action/Adventure.

==== 2024 ====
Their second US headline tour in September and October 2024 followed the release of their album "How To Build An Ocean: Instructions" earlier in the year. They were supported by Mothé and Thank You, I'm Sorry.
