= Never Happy, Ever After =

Studio album by As It Is
- Released: 20 April 2015
- Recorded: October–November 2014, St. Cloud, Florida
- Genres: Emo; pop punk
- Length: 36:17
- Label: Fearless
- Producers: James Paul Wisner, As It Is

As It Is chronology
This Mind of Mine (2014)	Never Happy, Ever After (2015)	okay. (2017)

Deluxe edition
- Deluxe edition album artwork

Singles from Never Happy, Ever After
- 1. "Dial Tones" Released: 20 January 2015; 2. "Concrete" Released: 3 March 2015; 3. "Cheap Shots & Setbacks" Released: 14 April 2015

Never Happy, Ever After is the debut studio album by British pop punk band As It Is. Following four self-released EPs, the band signed to Fearless Records in October 2014. A week after the signing, the band went to record with producer James Paul Wisner in St. Cloud, Florida, United States. Never Happy, Ever After was released through Fearless on 20 April 2015.

== Background ==
As It Is was started in spring 2012 by vocalist Patty Walters, who posted an advertisement stating that he was looking for musicians to be in a pop punk band using the online service Join My Band. Guitarist Andy Westhead and drummer Patrick Foley replied to the advertisement and were accepted into the band. Walters met guitarist Ben Biss while at university in Brighton. As It Is self-released three EPs. Following the release of a music video for "Can't Save Myself" in early February 2014 the band went on its first tour. The band's fourth EP, This Mind of Mine, was a crowdfunded effort, released in March 2014. On 2 October, it was announced the band signed to Fearless Records, the first UK band to do so. Walters called Fearless "one of my favorite record labels." Bands on Fearless "have played a huge role in my life, inspiring me massively".

== Composition and recording ==
Rock Sound contributor Rob Sayce noted that the album was influenced by All Time Low's Nothing Personal (2009). Sayce wrote that the album "was another milestone release for UK pop-punk, and those sky-scraping choruses bore the unmistakable mark of ATL." The band spent "a stupid amount of time on really making sure that it was the record we wanted", according to Walters. During the writing process, the band members had not seen their girlfriends in a few months. Walters called this "the hardest thing" he has had to face. "Dial Tones" was Walters and guitarist Ben Biss' way of handing the guilt the pair of them were facing. The bridge for the song was written at the Playhouse Theatre in London. The group demoed vocals for the song in the bar of the theatre.

A week after signing to Fearless, the band went to record in a studio located in St. Cloud, Florida, with James Paul Wisner and the band producing the sessions. Recording was done over the course of five and a half weeks. Working with Wisner was "a huge learning curve" for the band, according to Walters. Wisner mixed the album, before it was mastered by Brad Blackwood at Euphonics.

== Release ==
On 20 January 2015, "Dial Tones" was released as a single. The music video for which was made by LifeIsArtFilms. On 23 February, Never Happy, Ever After was announced for release, and the artwork was revealed. Between late February and early April, As It Is supported Set It Off on the Glamour Kills Spring Break '15 tour. On 3 March, "Concrete" was made available for steaming. On 14 April, the album was made available for streaming. On the same day, the music video for "Cheap Shots & Setbacks" was released. The video was made by Dan Centrone. Never Happy, Ever After was released by Fearless Records on 20 April. In May, the band went on a co-headlining tour with This Wild Life with support from Seaway and Boston Manor. The band played on the 2015 Warped Tour; a music video was released for "Sorry" on 11 September with footage from the tour.

Following this, they embarked on tours of Japan and Australia, leading up to a support slot for Mayday Parade on the 2015 Alternative Press Tour in October and November. On 10 November, a music video for "Speak Soft" premiered through Alternative Press' website; it was made by LifeIsArtVisuals and filmed on a beach in Newcastle in Australia in the early hours of the morning. In December, the band supported Lower Than Atlantis on their tour of the UK. In February and March, the band supported Sleeping with Sirens on the UK tour. A deluxe edition of the album was released on 8 April 2016. It featured a new song, "Winter's Weather", and acoustic versions of three tracks: "Dial Tones", "Cheap Shots & Setbacks" and "Concrete". A music video had been released for "Winter's Weather" the previous day.

== Reception ==
Professional ratings
Review scores
Source	Rating
AllMusic	3.5/5 stars
Alternative Press (Japan)	4/5 stars
idobi Radio	9/10
Kerrang!	4/5 stars

"Dial Tones" was included on Alternative Press's "12 New Songs You Need To Hear From January 2015" list. The album was included at number 19 on Rock Sound's top 50 releases of 2015 list.

== Track listing ==
All music and lyrics written by As It Is.

Standard edition
No.	Title	Length
1.	"Speak Soft"	3:16
2.	"Cheap Shots & Setbacks"	2:53
3.	"Sorry"	2:59
4.	"Drowning Deep in Doubt"	3:48
5.	"Dial Tones"	3:19
6.	"My Oceans Were Lakes"	3:48
7.	"Concrete"	2:58
8.	"Turn Back to Me"	2:57
9.	"Can't Save Myself"	3:46
10.	"Silence (Pretending's So Comfortable)"	3:43
11.	"You, the Room & the Devil on Your Shoulder"	2:56
Total length:		43:30

Bonus tracks

Deluxe Edition
No.	Title	Length
12.	"Winter's Weather"	3:16
13.	"Cheap Shots & Setbacks (acoustic version)"	3:01
14.	"Dial Tones (acoustic version)"	3:24
15.	"Concrete (acoustic version)" (featuring Ansley Newman)	3:04

10th Anniversary Edition (2025)

Never Happy, Ever After X
No.	Title	Length
1.	"Speak Soft X (featuring Kellin Quinn of Sleeping With Sirens)"	3:16
2.	"Cheap Shots & Setbacks X (featuring Mikey Chapman of Mallory Knox & Roam (band))"	2:53
3.	"Sorry X (featuring Mikaila Delgado of Yours Truly)"	2:59
4.	"Drowning Deep in Doubt X (featuring Beauty School)"	3:48
5.	"Dial Tones X (featuring Lucas Woodland of Holding Absence)"	3:19
6.	"My Oceans Were Lakes X (featuring Dave "BrownSound" Baksh)"	3:48
7.	"Concrete X (featuring Tobi Duncan of Trash Boat)"	2:58
8.	"Turn Back to Me X (featuring Artio)"	2:57
9.	"Can't Save Myself X (featuring NOAHFINNCE)"	3:46
10.	"Silence X (featuring Hidden In Plain View)"	3:43
11.	"You, the Room & the Devil on Your Shoulder X (featuring Transit (band) & narrowcast.)"	2:56

== Personnel ==
Personnel per booklet.

As It Is

- Patty Walters – lead vocals, acoustic guitar
- Ben Biss – vocals, guitar
- Andy Westhead – guitar
- Alistair Testo – bass
- Patrick Foley – drums

Production and design

- James Paul Wisner – producer
- As It Is – producer
- Brad Blackwood – mastering
- Felicia Simon – artwork concept, photography
- Mike Farrell – layout
- Tom Bornarel – As It Is Logo

== Charts ==
Chart (2015)	Peak position
Scottish Albums Chart	40
UK Albums Chart	39
UK Album Downloads Chart	37
UK Albums Sales Chart	33
UK Physical Albums Chart	52
UK Rock & Metal Albums Chart	2
US Billboard 200	159
US Billboard Alternative Albums	17
US Billboard Heatseekers Albums	2
US Billboard Independent Albums	14
US Billboard Top Album Sales	77
US Billboard Top Rock Albums	23
