= How to Build an Ocean: Instructions =

2024 studio album

Studio album by Bears in Trees
- Released: 26 April 2024
- Studios: Subfrantic Studios, Bromley; Vada Studios, Cookhill
- Genre: Indie rock
- Label: I Sure Hope It Does (self-release)
- Producer: George Perks

Bears in Trees chronology
Every Moonbeam Every Feverdream (2022)	How to Build an Ocean: Instructions (2024)	Success is Unlikely (2025)

Singles from How to Build an Ocean: Instructions
- 1. "Things That Look Like Mistakes" Released: 24 January 2024; 2. "Hot Chocolate" Released: 15 February 2024; 3. "I Wanna Feel Calm" Released: 13 March 2024; 4. "We Don't Speak Anymore" Released: 10 April 2024

How to Build an Ocean: Instructions is the second studio album by English indie rock band Bears in Trees, released on 26 April 2024 via the band's own label, I Sure Hope It Does. It is the band's first release to reach the UK Albums Chart, reaching a peak position of 64, as well as a peak of 1 on the Independent Album Breakers Chart. The album's release was preceded by singles "Things That Look Like Mistakes", "Hot Chocolate", "I Wanna Feel Calm", and "We Don't Speak Anymore".

British music magazine Rock Sound ranked the album 10th in their list of the top 24 albums of 2024, commenting that it was "easily the four-piece's best work to date and the finest album to feature a keytar solo this year".

== Background and development ==
How to Build an Ocean: Instructions was written following the band's rejection of an offer from a major-label deal, due to its exploitative nature. Whilst writing, the members faced an intense writer's block as they felt that they had already expressed everything they wished to in their previous projects, as well as feeling a pressure to make the next project "the most important record yet", in order to prove label executives wrong. Lyricist Iain Gillespie mentioned that they felt that they were trying to decide a theme for the album before even writing any lyrics, and that they were only able to properly express themselves once the four members relaxed and took the pressure off of writing.

How to Build an Ocean: Instructions contains key themes of constructing an identity, connection with others, and the band's attachment to their hometown of Croydon. In keeping with these themes, the album cover, designed by Mike Hall, features a colourful, collaged map of Croydon, with doodles and annotations to showcase parts of the area that are of personal significance to the band. It was inspired by the band's return home after the two years of touring and seeing the world following their debut studio album, and everybody else smiled back (2021), and feeling as though they were back where they started. Like all Bears in Trees music, the lyrics of tracks from How to Build an Ocean: Instructions were written by Nick Peters and Iain Gillespie. They are autobiographical in nature – "Nothing Cures Melancholy Like Looking At Maps", for example, touches on Peters' childhood, including his family's experiences with racism.

The album takes its name from Olga Tokarczuk's Flights. Gillespie commented that the quote was chosen due to the album "being about trying to construct an identity, a sense of self that is complex and multi-facetted and both chaotically grand and also mundane and simple, it was perfect. You are an ocean, and you are building yourself, and I love that." How to Build an Ocean: Instructions contains many references to literature, philosophy, film and pop culture. One song in particular, "I Can't See Anything I Don't Like About You", contains repeated references to characters from different pieces of media that lyricist Peters relates to, such as Joel and Clementine from Eternal Sunshine of the Spotless Mind, and Wirt from Over the Garden Wall.

== Release ==
The band released 4 singles in the lead up to the album's release, each accompanied by a music video. Lead single "Things That Look Like Mistakes" was released on 24 January 2024, shortly after the announcement of the album. The indie rock track discussed the idea of finding joy in small moments in response to feeling a lack of purpose.

The band arranged a meet-up in Hyde Park, London on 13 February to premier the album's second single, "Hot Chocolate", which was attended by 50 fans. The single was released 2 days later, on 15 February.

The third single, "I Wanna Feel Calm", released on 13 March. Lyricist Gillespie commented that they wrote the lyrics after facing burnout over the need to improve themself, and only seeing the parts of themself that they felt they needed to better.

How to Build an Ocean: Instructions released in full on 26 April 2024, and was self-released under the band's own label name, I Sure Hope It Does. It rose to 64th in the UK Album Charts, marking a first for the band.

== Critical reception ==
How to Build an Ocean: Instructions was met with praise by various reviewers. Thom Earle of The Scene commented, "I dare you to even try avoiding the urge to crank the volume and dance in your socks with your third glass of wine while listening" and called the album "the most mature sound we've heard from Bears in Trees". Noizze noted the change in tone from their previous album, and everybody else smiled back, stating that it was "a deeply self-aware record that still carries the comfort, optimism warmth of its predecessor, albeit in a way that also appreciates how life can sometimes be callous, unpleasant and pessimistic". Noizze gave the album a score of 8/10, particularly commending the sequence of the final three songs: "Nothing Cures Melancholy Like Looking At Maps", "We Don't Speak Anymore" and "I Don't Wanna Be Angry". The album was ranked at 10th on Rock Sound's list of top 24 albums of 2024, with the publication noting how Bears in Trees "blend[ed] together their love of midwest emo and the danceable indie sounds of the early 2000s and place[d] them alongside honest and relatable lyrics".

== Track listing ==
All tracks are written by Iain Gillespie, Nick Peters, George Berry, Callum Litchfield.

No.	Title	Length
1.	"Your Favourite Coat"	2:30
2.	"Things That Look Like Mistakes"	2:28
3.	"Injured Crow"	3:32
4.	"I Can't See Anything I Don't Like About You"	3:24
5.	"All You Get Is Confetti"	4:00
6.	"Tai Chi With My Dad"	2:32
7.	"I Wanna Feel Calm" (Co-written by Jason Perry)	3:16
8.	"Henry Says" (Co-written by Jason Perry)	3:42
9.	"Hot Chocolate"	2:33
10.	"Nothing Cures Melancholy Like Looking At Maps"	2:58
11.	"We Don't Speak Anymore"	2:55
12.	"I Don't Wanna Be Angry"	3:08
Total length:		37:02

== Personnel ==
=== Bears in Trees ===
- Iain Gillespie – lead vocals, bass, keyboards, lyrics
- Nicholas "Nick" Peters – guitar, backing vocals, lyrics
- Callum Litchfield – lead vocals, piano, ukulele, keyboards, flute
- George Berry – drums, percussion, keyboards, backing vocals

=== Other personnel ===
- Jason Perry – co-writer (tracks 7,8)
- Joe "Trumpet Joe" Matthews – trumpet (tracks 1, 2, 4, 6, 7, 11)
- George "GP" Perks – engineering, production, mixing
- Sam Harding – assistant engineering
- Antony Ryan – mastering
- Mike Hall – cover artwork
- Chris "RebelliousTeeth" Wood – inside artwork
- Suede (Kay Holden) – photography
- James Charles Abbott – photography
