= I Went to Hell and Back =

Studio album by As It Is
- Released: 4 February 2022
- Genres: Post-hardcore; pop-punk; electronic rock
- Length: 40:20
- Label: Fearless
- Producer: Zach Jones

As It Is chronology
Bargaining: Reimagined (2019)	I Went to Hell and Back (2022)	A Decade Uneventful: B-Sides and Rarities (2012–2022) (2024)

Singles from I Went to Hell and Back
- 1. "IDGAF" Released: 28 May 2021; 2. "I Lie to Me" Released: 5 August 2021; 3. "ILY, How Are You?" and "IDC, I Can't Take It" Released: 3 September 2021; 4. "I Miss 2003" Released: 11 November 2021; 5. "In Threes" Released: 9 December 2021

I Went to Hell and Back is the fourth studio album by British-American pop-punk band As It Is, released 4 February 2022 by Fearless Records. The album is the band's first as a trio after guitarist Benjamin Langford-Biss left in 2019 and drummer Patrick Foley left in 2020 to pursue his firefighting career, with vocalist Patty Walters recording drums in studio.

== Style and reception ==
I Went to Hell and Back ratings
Review scores
Source	Rating
Distorted Sound	8/10
Kerrang!	4/5
New Noise Magazine	4/5 stars
Sputnikmusic	3/5
Upset	4/5 stars

Distorted Sound's Katie Bird says that the band "have stopped playing it safe", showing with the post-hardcore screams on album opener "IDGAF"'s final chorus that they "aren't here to play around." Subsequent to the first couple tracks, the "heavy rock sound screeches to a halt" with "ILY, How Are You?" and "IDC, I Can't Take It" introducing "strange electronic production" on which it is "nice to see the band experimenting with different genres." The rest of the album switches back and forth between post-hardcore, electronic rock, and pop-punk, making for a "cumulation of everything [the band] have done so far." Bird closes by saying "Despite some mishaps, there is something for everyone. This band are at their best when they are having fun, and that definitely happens a lot on this album." Jake Richardson of Kerrang! writes that the album sees the band "settle on a sound somewhere in between the darkness of their last record [The Great Depression] and the more upbeat stylings of their early material", a "decision that pays dividends throughout." "I Miss 2003" is described as Walters' "love letter to the Warped Tour scene, with lyrics referencing New Found Glory, The All-American Rejects, Mayday Parade and Good Charlotte", but the song is "an anthem in its own right, and a song that does far more than just play on nostalgia for the sake of it." The album is "slick, coherent", "the most fully-rounded incarnation of As It Is to date", and "comfortably the best its creators have ever sounded."

New Noise Magazine's Tabitha Timms notes "IDGAF" for "shin[ing] a light on the band's ability to create catchy melodies and puts a heavy push on fast-paced, tongue-in-cheek lyrics, featured in the song's chorus"; "I Lie to Me"'s "descending staircase feeling of hooks tied into the chorus and verses"; "I Hate Me Too" as a "powerhouse of a track" which "indicates that their [sic] in-tune with their genre and modernizing it"; and the closing title track which "adds an easy listening dynamic to the record, leaving for a light ending to a bold record." Upset's Stephen Ackroyd calls the album, "in an unstable world", "a record that's raw, honest, but also determined and stronger than ever", making a catharsis that "feels important, both for the band and everyone else."

In a marginally less positive review, Sputnikmusic's Jesper L. opens by quoting the "I'm 14 and this is deep" meme, noting "admittedly shaky lyricism" such as the chorus "I don't want to be right/But I know that it's true/I'm dead inside/I hate me too" and "Sick and tired as the world keeps spinning around/Am I losing my head?" as not "exactly profound or in need of any interpretation whatsoever", but still "highly capable of opening up conversations about mental health among the target demographic of trap-infused pop punk." It's "a shame that As It Is have proven incapable of maturing alongside their audience" but "their attempts at destigmatising such topics haven't changed either." The album overall is "a collection of songs that suck, rule, or simply exist, without any regards for cohesion or flow."

== Track listing ==
All tracks are written by Alistair Testo, Patty Walters, Ronald Ish, and Zach Jones, with additional writers noted.

I Went to Hell and Back track listing
No.	Title	Writer(s)	Length
1.	"IDGAF"	Mike Pepe	2:59
2.	"I Lie to Me"		2:48
3.	"ILY, How Are You?"		2:11
4.	"IDC, I Can't Take It"		3:02
5.	"I'd Rather Die"		2:44
6.	"I Miss 2003"		3:43
7.	"I'm Sick and Tired"		2:30
8.	"I Want to See God"		2:15
9.	"In Threes" (featuring Set It Off and JordyPurp)	Cody Carson, JordyPurp	3:05
10.	"I Hate Me Too"		2:58
11.	"I'm Gone"	Blake Roses, Jon Lundin	3:01
12.	"I Die 1000x"		2:47
13.	"I Can't Feel a Thing" (featuring The Word Alive)	Telle Smith	3:24
14.	"I Went to Hell and Back"		2:53
Total length:			40:20

== Personnel ==
As It Is

- Patty Walters – vocals, drums
- Alistair Testo – bass guitar
- Ronald Ish – guitar, vocals (1, 2)

Additional musicians

- Zach Jones – guitar (1)
- Cody Carson – vocals (9)
- JordyPurp – vocals (9)
- Telle Smith – vocals (13)

Technical

- Zach Jones – producer, mixing engineer, recording engineer, recording arranger, programming (5-8, 10-14)
- Patty Walters – producer (5)
- Mike Pepe – producer (1)
- Mike Tucci – mastering engineer
