= Lucy Blue (musician) =

Irish singer and songwriter

- Born: Lucy McDonell; 22 February 1998 (age 28)
- Origin: Dublin, Ireland
- Genres: Pop
- Occupations: Singer; songwriter; producer
- Instruments: Vocals; piano; guitar
- Years active: 2020–present
- Label: Promised Land Recordings
- Website: lucyblueofficial.com

Lucy Blue (born Lucy McDonnell; 25 February 2002) is an Irish singer, songwriter and producer from Dublin. When she was 17, Blue dropped out of college to pursue music and signed with Promised Land Recordings in 2020. She made her debut with the single "See You Later" (2021) and later that year released her second single, "Your Brother's Friend" (2021). Her first EP, FISHBOWL, was released on 18 June 2021. Her second EP, Suburban Hollywood, was released on 21 January 2022.

== Early life ==
Blue was born in Dublin, Ireland. She has spoken about being inspired by Thrasher Magazine and Frank Ocean as she was growing up. She was 16 when she first started producing songs and taught herself to use the music producing program, Logic Pro, in her bedroom.

Blue attended Ballyfermot College of Further Education and signed with Promised Land, a subsidiary of Columbia Records, in her second year of schooling.

== Career ==
Blue's debut single "See You Later" was released on 19 February 2021.

Blue's second single, "Your Brother's Friend" was released on 7 May 2021.

Her debut EP, FISHBOWL, was released on 18 June 2021. Blue stated that she wrote the majority of her EP in her bedroom when she was 16 and 17.

On 16 July 2021, she released her single "Taxi Driver", co-written with Matt Maltese. The music video was directed by Thomas James.

In the summer of 2021, she performed at festivals including Latitude, Reading, Leeds, Neighbourhood Weekender, TRNSMT and Isle of Wight and in the autumn she played headline shows in London and Dublin.

On 3 November 2021, Blue released her single "First Man On The Moon" with an accompanying music video, in which she wears a NASA astronaut suit.

In January 2022, NME included Lucy Blue in their "NME 100" list of "essential emerging artists for 2022" and Clash included her in their list of "artists who will shape 2022".

On 21 January 2022, Blue released her second EP Suburban Hollywood. as well as a video for her song "Postman".

In February 2022, Blue supported English folk punk band Bears in Trees on their UK tour. She is also scheduled to support George Ezra for 3 shows in April.

On 1 December 2023, Lucy released the album Unsent Letters.

== Influences ==
Blue cites musicians Van Morrison, Cocteau Twins, Prince, Joni Mitchell and Gwen Stefani as her biggest influences. Director Harmony Korine and photographer Davide Sorrenti also inspire her songwriting.

She was inspired by Hong Kong film director Wong Kar-wai when making the music video for her second single, "Your Brother's Friend" (2021).

== Artistry ==
Blue first attracted attention from media with her mixtape bedroom demos on SoundCloud in 2020. Blue describes herself as a songwriter before a singer, and as a visual person.

Her music has been described by Music Week as "bedroom pop" and as "alt-pop" by Clash.

== Discography ==
=== Albums ===
Title	Details
Unsent Letters	Released: 1 December 2023; Label: Promised Land Recordings; Format: Digital download

=== Extended plays ===
Title	Details
Fishbowl	Released: 18 June 2021; Label: Promised Land Recordings; Format: Digital download
Suburban Hollywood	Released: 21 January 2022; Label: Promised Land Recordings; Format: Digital download

=== Singles ===
Year	Title	Album	Ref.
2021	"See You Later"	Fishbowl	
2021	"Your Brother's Friend"	Fishbowl	
2021	"Taxi Driver"	Suburban Hollywood	
2022	"Pilot"	Suburban Hollywood	
2022	"First Man On The Moon"	Suburban Hollywood	
2022	"Postman"	Suburban Hollywood	
2022	"One Bed Apartment"	N/A	
2023	"I Left My Heart"	TBA	
2023	"Deserve You"	TBA	
2023	"Love Hate"	TBA	
2023	"Graveyard"	TBA	
