= And Everybody Else Smiled Back =

and everybody else smiled back

Studio album by Bears in Trees
- Released: 19 November 2021
- Studios: Subfrantic Studios, Bromley
- Genres: Alternative, indie rock, indie-pop
- Label: Counter Intuitive Records
- Producer: George Berry

Bears in Trees chronology
| Flower Through Concrete (2021) | and everybody else smiled back (2021) | Every Moonbeam Every Feverdream (2022) |

Singles from and everybody else smiled back
- 1. "Great Heights" Released: 17 September 2021; 2. "I’m Doing Push Ups" Released: 8 October 2021; 3. "Little Cellist" Released: 5 November 2021

And Everybody Else Smiled Back (stylised as and everybody else smiled back) is the debut studio album by English indie rock band Bears in Trees. The album, released on 19 November 2021 via Counter Intuitive Records and preceded by singles "Great Heights", "I'm Doing Push Ups" and "Little Cellist", covered stories from the band's years of early adulthood.

== Background ==
Following Bears in Trees' signing to Counter Intuitive Records, the Croydon-based band released EPs I Want To Feel Chaotic and Keep Me Safe, as well as double-A side single Flower Through Concrete, before releasing their debut studio album. The band had experienced an upsurge in popularity over the COVID-19 lockdowns due to their social media presence, so the album was highly anticipated by fans.

On the themes of the album, the band commented that "the best and worst moments of our lives have a morning after. and everybody else smiled back is about those mornings after." Like the majority of Bears in Trees’ music, the songs written for this album were highly autobiographical, and discussed experiences from the band's university years from the perspective of lyricists Iain Gillespie and Nick Peters. For example, Gillespie commented that the closing track "Klimt Painting" was written about one of their university house parties, and feeling like "the whole world is ending and this is all that's left."

The album's title is a paraphrased quote taken from The Secret History by Donna Tartt, with the original quote being "I smiled and everyone smiled back". In an interview with Good Noise Podcast, Gillespie explained that they chose to omit "I smiled" from the title as it added ambiguity that better matched the album's themes. They elaborated that the omission meant "you don't know why people are smiling — is it friendly? Is it malicious? Is it confused?"

== Release ==
The lead single from and everybody else smiled back, "Great Heights", was released on 17 September 2021. It was followed by two other pre-release singles, "I'm Doing Push Ups" on 9 October and "Little Cellist" on 5 November, before the full album was released on 19 November.

All three singles were accompanied by music videos. The video for "Little Cellist" was directed by Jamie Benyon, and showcases a story where a man finds a flash drive which plays him memories of his relationship with a woman. On the creation of the "Little Cellist" music video, Benyon said, "Bears In Trees created a beautifully poetic song, which demanded a powerful story and distinct images to convey the piece's particular tone. We settled on a surreal world, employing reversed digital photography whilst intercutting with the nostalgic feel of Super 8, to replicate the experience of memory." One of the non-single tracks, "Heaven Sent is a Coffee Cup", also received a music video following the release of the album, depicting a mundane day at a coffee shop transforming into a party.

The band embarked on their a headline tour in February 2022, playing shows across the UK to celebrate the release of the album. The tour culminated in the Electric Ballroom, a venue with a maximum capacity of 1500 in Camden Town, London.

== Reception ==
The album was met with praise by reviewers. Pleaser Magazine noted that it had "variety all while maintaining a certain Bears in Trees vibe. It's anything but monotonous, yet the shifts are not jarring." Distorted Sound Magazine commented that "based on and everybody else smiled back, it's clear the only way for this highly likeable band is up", and that the band "champion[s] a message of inclusivity and community spirit through their solid collection of lo-fi indie-pop tunes", giving the album a score of 8/10. Maximum Volume Music gave the album a score of 8.5, calling it a "welcome ray of sunshine" and praising the band's ability to "address difficult subject matters such as depression and mental health but retain that childlike wonder of the world we're living in".

== Track listing ==
All tracks are written by Iain Gillespie, Nick Peters, Callum Litchfield, George Berry.

| No. | Title | Length |
|---|---|---|
| 1. | "Cut Corners on Short Walks" | 3:35 |
| 2. | "I'm Doing Push Ups" | 3:23 |
| 3. | "Baggy Hoodies" | 3:55 |
| 4. | "Heaven Sent Is a Coffee Cup" | 2:52 |
| 5. | "Keep it Easy" | 2:08 |
| 6. | "Array of Light" | 3:43 |
| 7. | "Mossy Cobblestone" | 1:47 |
| 8. | "Confidant" | 2:58 |
| 9. | "Little Cellist" | 3:30 |
| 10. | "Sun Machine" | 3:28 |
| 11. | "Great Heights" | 2:52 |
| 12. | "If I Just Ask Politely" | 3:16 |
| 13. | "Klimt Painting" | 2:43 |
| Total length: | | 36:40 |

== Personnel ==
=== Bears in Trees ===
- Iain Gillespie – lead vocals, bass, lyrics
- Callum Litchfield – lead vocals, ukulele, piano, keyboards, brass and string arrangement
- Nick Peters – guitar, backing vocals, lyrics
- George Berry – drums, percussion, programming

=== Other personnel ===
- Joe "Trumpet Joe" Matthews – trumpet (tracks 1, 2, 8, 10, 13)
- Leiva Starker – violin (tracks 1, 3, 4, 6, 8, 9, 12,13)
- Lottie McVicker – cello (tracks 1, 3, 4, 6, 8, 9, 12, 13)
- Alexander Archer – mixing
- Antony Ryan – mastering
- Chris "RebelliousTeeth" Wood – artwork
- Emma Birdsall – photography
