= Success Is Unlikely/Success Is Monumental =

Duology of EPs by Bears in Trees

EP duology by Bears in Trees
- Released: 20 November 2025 (Success is Unlikely); 12 February 2026 (Success is Monumental)
- Studio: Subfrantic Recordings
- Genres: Indie rock, indie pop, emo
- Label: I Sure Hope It Does (independent)
- Producer: George Berry

Bears in Trees chronology
How to Build an Ocean: Instructions (2024)	Success Is Unlikely/Success Is Monumental (2025)	I See Blue (2026)

Success Is Unlikely and Success Is Monumental are a duology of EPs (extended plays) by English indie rock band Bears in Trees, self-released on 20 November 2025 and 12 February 2026 respectively, via their own label I Sure Hope It Does.

== Background ==
Between 2022 and 2024, the members of Bears in Trees – Iain Gillespie, Nick Peters, George Berry and Callum Litchfield – had worked for the band full-time. Initially, this was under their former label Counter Intuitive Records, then independently for the release of their 2024 album How to Build an Ocean: Instructions. By the end of 2024, the pressure of touring and keeping up with the band full-time led to an intense feeling of burnout in the four members.

From 2025, for the recording of Success Is Unlikely and Success Is Monumental, the members instead chose to work for the band part-time, taking up day jobs on the side, as well as choosing to revert to the band being entirely self-managed. As a result of these changes, they felt a renewed inspiration and novelty to be working on Bears in Trees music. The band commented that they the newfound creative freedom of making their own decisions was liberating. Although managing it alongside their lives was still challenging, they felt that the effort paid off, and that it was "the most 'Bears in Trees'" record they could have produced.

The songs of Success Is Unlikely were initially written for a deluxe version of their previous studio album, How to Build an Ocean: Instructions. This idea was abandoned due to the tracks being too distinct from the narrative of that album; the band instead wanted each track to exist on its own terms.

== Musical themes ==
The band described Success Is Unlikely as being "a project about the friends who were happy to watch your spark burn out, the acne scars you can see in the mirror, and the clarity that can only come post-heartbreak." The first single, "Left, Right, Goodnight!", discusses a situation where a loved one is apathetic to someone's struggle, and the hope that follows in rebuilding oneself.

The Scene described Success Is Monumental as "the answer to (...) Success is Unlikely, a triumphant ode to failure." Its lead single, "Large Hadron Collider", is about the importance of trying in spite of the high likelihood of failure, and is named after the famous LHC in Switzerland. "You're The Only Ten I See", the EP's second single, focuses on the fallout of a romantic relationship, an uncommon theme for the band.

== Releases ==
Each track on both EPs, barring "Heard It in a Dream" from Success Is Unlikely and "We Drop a Stitch Sometimes" from Success Is Monumental, was released as a single first, starting with "Left, Right, Goodnight" on 1 May 2025.

The band intended to release one single per month from the first EP, starting in May, over the course of 2025. This included not only the four singles of Success Is Unlikely, but also the other singles the band released that year: "Incredible Speed", for Counter Intuitive Records' ten-year anniversary album, and a cover of "We Don't Believe What's on TV" by Twenty One Pilots, for music publication Rock Sound's ten-year anniversary tribute album to Twenty One Pilots' Blurryface. They also planned to play small shows around each release. Due to issues with workload and timing, the band managed to release one song a month, as intended, for all months barring July, and only performed one show alongside Peters' brothers in Vienna.

The singles from Success Is Monumental followed in 2026, starting with "Large Hadron Collider" on 1 January 2026, before the full EP released on 12 February. Both EPs were pressed onto a single vinyl to commemorate the release of the duology.

In February 2026, the band embarked on a UK tour named "Tour Is Unlikely/Monumental" following the release of the duology, alongside Soot Sprite. They played several of the newly released songs from both EPs. Several of these shows sold out, including the initial Brighton date.

== Track listing ==
=== Success Is Unlikely ===
All tracks are written by Iain Gillespie, George Berry, Nick Peters, Callum Litchfield.

No.	Title	Length
1.	"Left, Right, Goodnight!"	2:16
2.	"No Love, No Heartbreak"	3:34
3.	"Some Character Development"	2:16
4.	"Heard It in a Dream"	3:01
Total length:		11:17

=== Success Is Monumental ===
All tracks are written by Iain Gillespie, George Berry, Nick Peters, Callum Litchfield.

No.	Title	Length
1.	"Large Hadron Collider"	2:56
2.	"You're the Only Ten I See"	3:00
3.	"(I Don't Have) Trauma"	3:07
4.	"We Drop a Stitch Sometimes"	3:03
Total length:		12:06

== Personnel ==
=== Bears in Trees ===
- Iain Gillespie – lead vocals, bass, lyrics, cover artwork
- Callum Litchfield – lead vocals, keyboard, additional instrumentation
- Nicholas "Nick" Peters – guitar, backing vocals, lyrics
- George Berry – percussion, production

=== Other personnel ===
- Joe "Trumpet Joe" Matthews – trumpet
- Jamie Ward – mixing
- Antony Ryan – mastering
