= Okay (album) =

Studio album by As It Is
- Released: 20 January 2017
- Genres: Pop punk; emo; pop rock
- Length: 36:36
- Label: Fearless
- Producer: Mike Green

As It Is chronology
| Never Happy, Ever After (2015) | Okay (2017) | The Great Depression (2018) |

Singles from okay.
- 1. "Okay" Released: 23 September 2016; 2. "Pretty Little Distance" Released: 14 October 2016; 3. "No Way Out" Released: 1 December 2016

Professional ratings
Review scores
| Source | Rating |
|---|---|
| AllMusic | 3/5 stars |

Okay (stylised as okay.) is the second studio album by British pop punk band As It Is.

== Background ==
Immediately following As It Is' 2015 album Never Happy, Ever After, the band played shows across the US on the 2015 run of Vans Warped Tour. While on tour lead singer, Patty Walters, struggled with depression and his mental health. He started writing songs during this time in order to cope. During the following year Walters came out to his bandmates about his state and started going through professional therapy. In January 2016, the group took a brief break to unwind, before they started writing for their second album.

The band went to Los Angeles to start recording the album with producer Mike Green in July 2016.

Okay. is the band's second and final album to feature lead guitarist Andy Westhead.

== Concept and style ==
It was stated several times during promotion of the album the main theme of the album is, "The idea that it's okay to not be okay" making a statement about mental health issues and the stigma surrounding them. The concept of "faking a smile" is repeated several times throughout the album.

Songs on the album cover topics such as depression, anxiety, divorce, loss, and heartbreak. The aesthetic for the album's promotion was heavily inspired by the 1950s, which was part of an intentional decision to contrast the happy bright sound with the darker and personal lyrical themes.

With Mike Green in the studio, the band went for a more polished upbeat pop rock sound, more so than the more raw "emo" sound seen on some songs on Never Happy.

== Release ==
Okay was announced on 22 September 2016, as well as revealing the album's artwork and track listing. In the same announcement, a music video was released for "Okay". In October and November, the group supported Sum 41 on their headlining US tour. On 14 October, a 1950s-themed music video was released for "Pretty Little Distance", and the song was released as a single. Okay was released on 20 January 2017. On 6 February, a music video was released for "Hey Rachel", directed by Joshua Halling.

In April and May, the group embarked on their first US headlining tour, with support from Roam, Grayscale and Sleep On It. On 9 October, it was revealed that guitarist Andy Westhead left the band two months prior, citing "feelings and differences had been building up" over the preceding year. On 8 November, a music video was released for "No Way Out", directed by Halling. In November and December, the group supported Waterparks on their US headlining tour. In March 2018, the band went on a UK tour with support from Like Pacific and Grayscale. A jukebox version of "Hey Rachel" was released as a single on 13 April.

== Track listing ==
| No. | Title | Length |
|---|---|---|
| 1. | "Pretty Little Distance" | 3:11 |
| 2. | "Okay" | 3:36 |
| 3. | "Hey Rachel" | 3:00 |
| 4. | "Patchwork Love" | 3:40 |
| 5. | "Curtains Close" | 3:05 |
| 6. | "No Way Out" | 3:17 |
| 7. | "Soap" | 3:42 |
| 8. | "Austen" | 3:00 |
| 9. | "Until I Return" | 3:33 |
| 10. | "The Coast Is Where Home Is" | 3:16 |
| 11. | "Still Remembering" | 3:16 |

Japanese bonus track
| No. | Title | Length |
|---|---|---|
| 12. | "Hey Rachel" (jukebox edition) |

== Personnel ==
As It Is

- Patty Walters – lead vocals, acoustic guitar
- Benjamin Langford-Biss – vocals, guitar
- Andy Westhead – guitar
- Alistair Testo – bass guitar
- Patrick Foley – drums

Additional personnel

- Mike Green – production, mixing, engineering
- Alan Douches – mastering
- Yannick Bouchard – artwork
- Sage Lamonica – layout
- Stay Bold – logo

== Charts ==
| Chart (2017) | Peak position |
|---|---|
| Australian Albums (ARIA) | 96 |
| Scottish Albums (Official Charts) | 47 |
| UK Albums (Official Charts) | 48 |
