= Rare Americans =

Canadian band

- Origin: Vancouver, British Columbia, Canada
- Genres: Pop rock, indie rock, rap rock
- Years active: 2018–present
- Labels: Crooked City Records, Atlantic Records (2020)
- Members: James Priestner; Jared Priestner; Jan Cajka; Duran Ritz
- Past members: Ginger Chen; Lubo Ivan; Jeff Quinn
- Website: www.rareamericans.com

Rare Americans is a Canadian-Slovak pop rock band from Vancouver, British Columbia, most noted as Juno Award nominees for Breakthrough Group of the Year at the Juno Awards of 2023.

The band was created by brothers James and Jared Priestner, and includes bassist Jan Cajka and drummer Duran Ritz. In May 2023, it was announced that guitarist Lubo Ivan had made the decision to leave the band in December 2022. They are known for having animated videos created by Solis Animation.

At the Juno Awards of 2020, Ben Kaplan won the Jack Richardson Producer of the Year Award for his work on Rare Americans' "Brittle Bones Nicky" and Mother Mother's "It's Alright".

== Members ==
=== Current members ===
James Priestner: Vocals, Guitar

Jared Priestner: Songwriting

Jan "Jongo" Cajaka: Bass, Guitar, Keyboards, Trumpet

Duran Ritz: Drums, Percussion

=== Past members ===
Lubo Ivan: Guitar

Ginger Chen: Bass

Jeff Quin: Bass

== Discography ==
=== Albums ===
Title	Details
Rare Americans	Released: 13 August 2018; Format: CD, LP, digital download, streaming
Rare Americans 2	Released: 5 March 2021; Format: CD, LP, digital download, streaming
Jamesy Boy & The Screw Loose Zoo	Released: 19 November 2021; Label: Crooked City Records; Format: CD, LP, digital download, streaming
Jamesy Boy & The Screw Loose Zoo (Deluxe)	Released: 12 July 2022; Label: Crooked City Records; Format: CD, LP, digital download, streaming
You're Not a Bad Person, it's Just a Bad World	Released: 21 July 2022; Label: Crooked City Records; Format: CD, LP, digital download, streaming
Searching For Strawberries: The Story of Jongo Bongo	Released: 7 July 2023; Label: Crooked City Records; Format: CD, LP, digital download, streaming
Rare Americans 4 - "The Human Animal"	Released: August 16, 2024; Label: Crooked City Records; Format: CD, LP, digital download, streaming
(S)KiDS	Released: April 5, 2025; Label: Crooked City Records; Format: CD, LP, digital download, streaming

=== Extended plays ===
Title	Details
Songs That Don't Belong	Released: 22 December 2022; Label: Crooked City Records; Formats: Digital download, streaming

=== Singles ===
Title	Year	Album
"Balmoral Hotel"	2018	Rare Americans
"Cats, Dogs & Rats"	2018	Rare Americans
"Moss Park"	2018	Rare Americans
"I vs I"	2018	Rare Americans
"Pay Me Back"	2018	Rare Americans
"Fuck You World"	2018	Rare Americans
"Garbage Day"	2018	Rare Americans
"Night After Night"	2018	Rare Americans
"Same Boat We Row"	2018	Rare Americans
"I Had it Coming"	2018	Rare Americans
"Hands Free"	2018	Rare Americans
"It Was You"	2018	Rare Americans
"Wake Up"	2018	Rare Americans
"Worm Is Gonna Turn"	2018	Non-album singles
"Let Go For Love"	2018	Non-album singles
"Canoe"	2018	Non-album singles
"Brittle Bones Nicky"	2019	Rare Americans 2
"Ryan and Dave"	2019	Rare Americans 2
"Ryan & Dave (Acoustic)"	2019	Non-album singles
"Milk Man"	2019	Rare Americans 2
"Hullabaloo"	2020	Rare Americans 2
"Gas Mask"	2020	Rare Americans 2
"The Moneyz"	2020	Non-album singles
"Knives, Guns & Bed" (feat. Clare Twiddy)	2021	Rare Americans 2
"Brittle Bones Nicky 2"	2021	Rare Americans 2
"Baggage"	2021	Jamesy Boy & The Screw Loose Zoo
"Mama Bear"	2021	Jamesy Boy & The Screw Loose Zoo
"Hey Sunshine"	2021	Jamesy Boy & The Screw Loose Zoo
"Rhythm Kitchen" (feat. D. Smoke)	2021	Jamesy Boy & The Screw Loose Zoo
"Baby Boy"	2021	Jamesy Boy & The Screw Loose Zoo
"Walkin' n Talkin'"	2021	Jamesy Boy & The Screw Loose Zoo
"Flashback"	2022	Non-album singles
"Love Is All I Bring"	2022	You're Not a Bad Person, it's Just a Bad World
"Lose My Cool"	2022	You're Not a Bad Person, it's Just a Bad World
"Moving On"	2022	You're Not a Bad Person, it's Just a Bad World
"Drawing Swords"	2022	Songs That Don't Belong
"Tremendous"	2022	Songs That Don't Belong
"Little White Lies"	2022	Songs That Don't Belong
"Rambo"	2022	Songs That Don't Belong
"Bruised"	2022	Songs That Don't Belong
"Fool's Gold"	2022	Songs That Don't Belong
"Milk and Honey"	2023	Searching for Strawberries: The Story of Jongo Bongo
"Money!"	2023	Searching for Strawberries: The Story of Jongo Bongo
"Stay Curious"	2023	Searching for Strawberries: The Story of Jongo Bongo
"2 U's"	2023	Searching for Strawberries: The Story of Jongo Bongo
"Good Eats"	2023	Searching for Strawberries: The Story of Jongo Bongo
"Northern Lights"	2023	Searching for Strawberries: The Story of Jongo Bongo
"Brothers"	2023	Searching for Strawberries: The Story of Jongo Bongo
"No Troubles"	2023	Searching for Strawberries: The Story of Jongo Bongo
"Sunday Morning"	2023	Searching for Strawberries: The Story of Jongo Bongo
"Fuck you Elmo"	2023	Searching for Strawberries: The Story of Jongo Bongo
"Moving Beyond"	2023	Searching for Strawberries: The Story of Jongo Bongo
"Odd Ducks"	2023	Searching for Strawberries: The Story of Jongo Bongo
"Kyle and Dave" (Ryan and Dave Demo)	2023	Non-album singles
"Today" (feat. NOAHFINNCE)	2023	Non-album singles
"Dead of the Night"	2024	The Human Animal
"Got U"	2024	The Human Animal
"Fortune Cookies"	2024	The Human Animal
"Placebo"	2024	The Human Animal
"X on You" (feat. Lil Meesha)	2024	The Human Animal
"Stupid Heart"	2024	The Human Animal
"Sadie Jane"	2024	The Human Animal
"Song For The People"	2024	The Human Animal
"Take It Right On"	2024	The Human Animal
"The Machine"	2024	The Human Animal
"Rat Race"	2024	The Human Animal
"Sway"	2024	The Human Animal
"The Human Animal"	2024	The Human Animal
"Young Minds"	2024	The Human Animal
"Lovers For A Night"	2024	The Human Animal
"Demons"	2024	Non-album singles
"101"	2024	The Human Animal
"Mr. Please"	2024	The Human Animal
"Brittle Bones Nicky 3"	2024	Non-album singles
"(S)KiDS"	2025	(S)KiDS
"Kansas"	2025	(S)KiDS
"Fuck The Youth"	2025	(S)KiDS
"Is There A Way Out?"	2025	(S)KiDS
"Anomaly"	2025	(S)KiDS
"The Walls"	2025	(S)KiDS
"Kids These Days"	2025	(S)KiDS
"Good To Be Young"	2025	(S)KiDS
"Ghosts"	2025	(S)KiDS
"Seashells"	2025	(S)KiDS
"Drugs"	2025	(S)KiDS
"What Are You Gonna Do Now?"	2025	(S)KiDS
"Klondike Hotel"	2025	(S)KiDS
"Hands & Blood"	2025	(S)KiDS
"Deadly Shade Of Blue"	2025	(S)KiDS
"I've Got A Friend In You"	2025	(S)KiDS
"Bury & Hide"	2025	(S)KiDS
"Love & Pain"	2025	(S)KiDS
"Voices In My Head"	2025	(S)KiDS
"Broken Road"	2025	(S)KiDS
"Give Up First"	2025	(S)KiDS
