= Noahfinnce =

British singer-songwriter (born 1999)

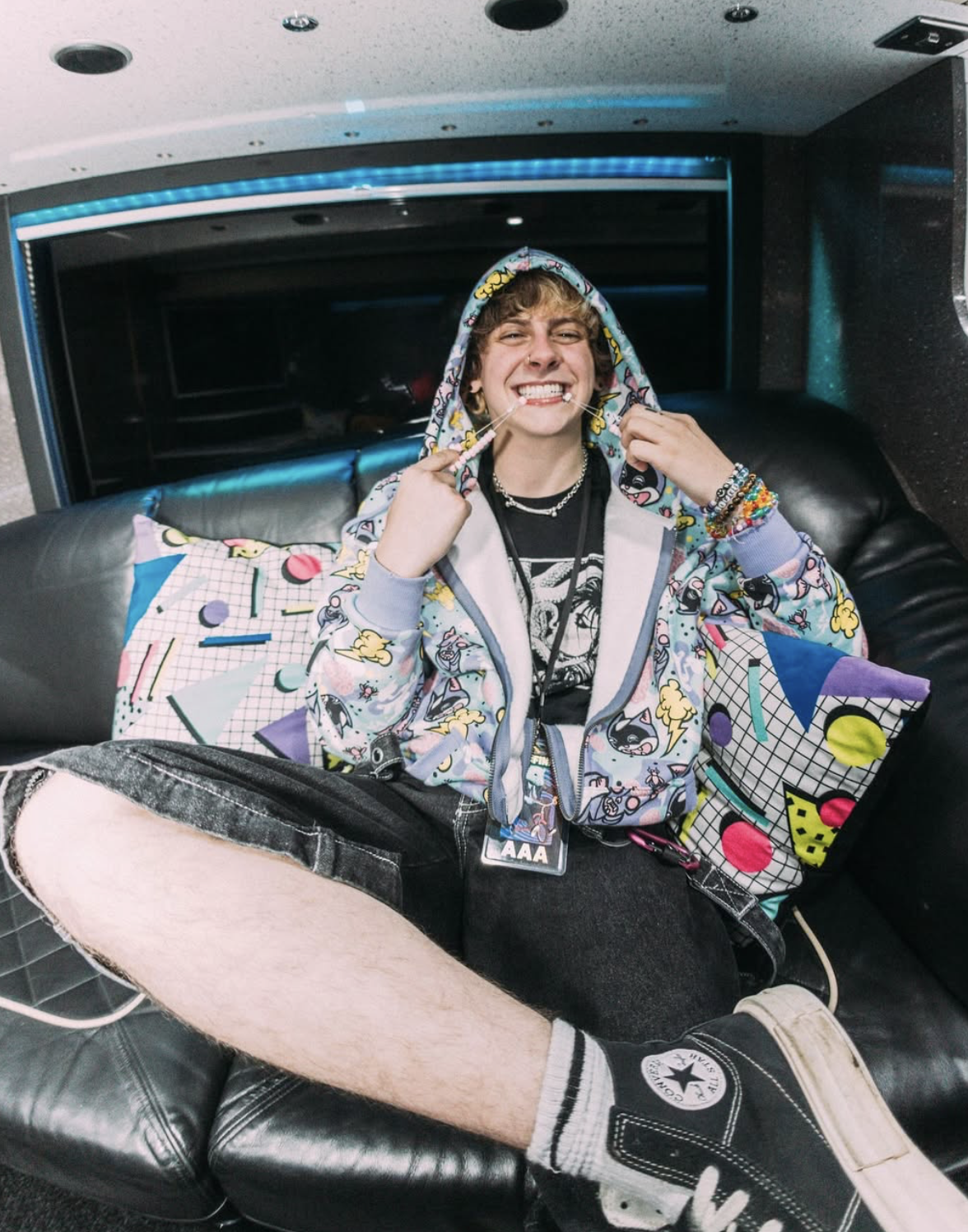
- Adams in 2024

Background information
- Born: 18 August 1999 (age 27); Ascot, Berkshire, England
- Genres: Pop-punk; pop rock
- Occupations: Singer-songwriter; YouTuber
- Instruments: Vocals; guitar; bass; drums; ukulele
- Years active: 2018–present
- Label: Hopeless
- Website: noahfinnce.com

YouTube information
- Channel: NOAHFINNCE
- Genres: Music; LGBTQ+; commentary
- Subscribers: 1.02 million
- Views: 156 million
- Last updated: 02 July 2026

Noah Finn Adams (born 18 August 1999), known professionally as Noahfinnce (stylised in all caps), is a British singer-songwriter and YouTuber.

== Biography ==
=== Early life ===
Adams was raised in Ascot, England. His interest in music began when he was a young child. His father introduced him to bands such as Nirvana, Foo Fighters, and The Prodigy. The first band he can remember "falling in love with" is Busted. They inspired him to play guitar, although he only received an acoustic guitar at the time.

During his teenage years, he became more involved in the pop punk and emo scene, looking up to bands such as My Chemical Romance, Pierce the Veil, and Neck Deep. He attended many different concerts, meeting many of his best friends while doing so.

=== YouTube ===
Adams initially posted singing covers on Instagram. In 2015, he started posting his covers to his YouTube channel "Triggerwarningrat" as Instagram imposed a 15-second limit on videos at the time. As his channel grew, he began posting more vlog content alongside his covers. In 2017, Adams used the platform to come out as transgender and shared his transition journey, posting regular testosterone and top surgery updates.

In 2018, Adams released his first original single, "Asthma Attack", posting a music video on YouTube, later explaining that he wrote it about being transgender and the double life he was living, being called his birth name and seen as a girl at school, while being a boy called Noah online. Adams now posts content discussing LGBTQ+ topics alongside his covers and original music videos.

In January 2026, Adams reached 1 million YouTube subscribers.

=== Signing to Hopeless Records ===
On 19 November 2020, Adams announced he had been signed to Hopeless Records. The announcement was accompanied by the release of the song "Life's A Bit", with the music video published the same day on his YouTube channel.

== Personal life ==
Adams publicly came out as a transgender man in 2017 and as bisexual in 2020. When Adams came out as transgender, he said "It came to the time when I was gonna start testosterone and things were gonna change very rapidly. So I decided I was going to come out and because I had already had an audience, people were asking a lot of questions and that realized that I could help people that were going through a similar thing to me."

In 2021, he was diagnosed with ADHD. In 2024, he published a video on his YouTube channel detailing his February autism diagnosis.

== Discography ==
=== EPs ===
- Stuff from My Brain (10th of September 2021, Hopeless Records)

Track listing:

No.	Title	Length
1.	"LIFE'S A BIT"	2:32
2.	"STUPID"	2:35
3.	"PITY"	2:46
4.	"MIND BLANK NO THOUGHTS"	2:26
5.	"KICKIN TRASH"	2:52
6.	"WEIRDOS"	3:29

- My Brain After Therapy (3rd of June 2022, Hopeless Records)

Track Listing:

No.	Title	Length
1.	"WORMS (In My Brain)"	3:23
2.	"I JUST WON'T CARE"	2:26
3.	"BETTER DAYS"	2:46
4.	"CHASING DAYLIGHT"	2:43
5.	"TELL ME THAT YOU'RE OKAY"	3:04
6.	"AFTER THERAPY (feat Hot Mulligan)"	2:21

=== Albums ===
- Growing Up on the Internet (2024, Hopeless Records)

It was listed 44th by Kerrang on their 50 best albums of 2024 list.

Track listing:

No.	Title	Length
1.	"KINDA LOVE IT"	01:56
2.	"GROWING UP ON THE INTERNET"	03:19
3.	"3 DAY HEADACHE"	01:54
4.	"I KNOW BETTER"	04:09
5.	"ALEXITHYMIA"	03:15
6.	"SUBTITLES"	03:02
7.	"RISE AND GRIND"	02:23
8.	"ALL THE SAME/NOT THE SAME"	02:33
9.	"SCUMBAG"	03:06
10.	"LOVELY LADIES"	01:58
11.	"GIBBERISH"	03:09

- Deluxe Version Bonus Tracks

No.	Title	Length
12.	"HEADCASE"	03:21
13.	"PET WITH THE TISM"	02:43
14.	"SICK OF BEING NICE"	02:33
15.	"SPLINTERING"	02:24

=== Singles ===
List of singles, showing year released and album name
Title	Year	Album
"Asthma Attack"	2018	Non-album singles
"Underachiever"	2020	Non-album singles
"LIFE'S A BIT"	2020	STUFF FROM MY BRAIN
"STUPID"	2021	STUFF FROM MY BRAIN
"parents" (feat. Doll Skin)	2021	Non-album single
"MIND BLANK NO THOUGHTS"	2021	STUFF FROM MY BRAIN
"KICKIN TRASH"	2021	STUFF FROM MY BRAIN
"WORMS (In My Brain)"	2022	MY BRAIN AFTER THERAPY
"AFTER THERAPY" (feat. Hot Mulligan)	2022	MY BRAIN AFTER THERAPY
"TELL ME THAT YOU'RE OKAY"	2022	MY BRAIN AFTER THERAPY
"CHASING DAYLIGHT"	2022	MY BRAIN AFTER THERAPY
"LALALA"	2022	Non-album singles
"No Point Pretending (Song For Tour)" (feat. Bears in Trees)	2023	Non-album singles
"I KNOW BETTER"	2023	GROWING UP ON THE INTERNET
"GROWING UP ON THE INTERNET"	2023	GROWING UP ON THE INTERNET
"SCUMBAG"	2023	GROWING UP ON THE INTERNET
"3 DAY HEADACHE"	2024	GROWING UP ON THE INTERNET
"ALEXITHYMIA"	2024	GROWING UP ON THE INTERNET
"LOVELY LADIES"	2024	GROWING UP ON THE INTERNET
"I Miss Having Sex But At Least I Don't Want To Die Anymore"	2024	Non-album single
"PET WITH THE TISM"	2024	GROWING UP ON THE INTERNET (DELUXE)
"HEADCASE"	2024	GROWING UP ON THE INTERNET (DELUXE)
"MR OVERWHELM"	2026	WONKY
"TOO SENSITIVE"	2026	WONKY
"WONKY"	2026	WONKY

=== Features ===
List of songs NOAHFINNCE has featured on, showing year released and album name
Title	Year	Album
"Clearview" by Sophie Powers	2022	Red in Revenge
"(NOT A) LOVE SONG" by SOAP, previously known as The Tyne	2023	COMPLAINING. (BUT THERE IS MUSIC)
"Today" by Rare Americans	2023	Non-album single
"Can't Save Myself X (feat. NOAHFINNCE)" by As It Is	2025	Never Happy Ever After
"Boygirl" by Pollyana	2025	Boygirl

== Tours ==
=== NOAHFINNCE Debut Tour ===
Ahead of Slam Dunk Festival and his upcoming tour, Adams played his first ever show in Hitchin in July 2021. His debut UK tour took place in September 2021, consisting of 4 shows total in Southampton, Manchester, Bristol, and London. Supporting him were Bears in Trees, The Oozes, and SOAP.

=== US Tour 2022 ===
In March 2022, Adams announced that he would be going on tour across America with Sophie Powers in May and June of that year. He played a total of 19 shows, 8 of which were sold out. Adams' second EP, "MY BRAIN AFTER THERAPY", was released in the midst of the tour.

=== Anatomy of a Rat UK Tour ===
Originally planned for January 2022, the tour was postponed until September due to COVID-19, with one show in May. This allowed many shows to get upgraded venues and/or additional dates. Supporting him were Sophie Powers and The Oozes. He played to his biggest crowd in Manchester with over 800 in the audience.

=== A Kiss For The Whole World: Album Launch Shows ===
In February, March and April of 2023, Enter Shikari played three legs of intimate shows in the UK to celebrate the release of their album "A Kiss For The Whole World". NOAHFINNCE supported them on the first leg in February, alongside Blackout Problems, performing in London, Manchester, Wolverhampton, Bristol and Glasgow.

=== US Tour 2023 ===
In December 2022, Adams announced his second US tour, planned for the spring of 2023 with Bears in Trees and Action/Adventure. There were 22 shows scheduled across the US and one show in Canada.

=== Goopy Goopers UK Tour ===
In August 2023, Adams announced a headline tour of 8 dates in the UK and Ireland for October 2023 with support from Blackout Problems and LOU.

=== A Kiss For The Whole World UK/EU Tour 2024 ===
In February 2024, Adams supported Enter Shikari a second time on the UK leg of their EU/UK tour, playing arenas for the first time. The tour concluded at OVO arena, Wembley, where he was joined on stage by "Dancing Magical Schoolgirl", Kelsey Ellison, during the song "Scumbag".

=== US Tour 2024 ===
In March 2024, Adams embarked on a tour in support of his recently released album "Growing Up On The Internet". He was supported by TX2, Teenage Joans, and Chase Petra who later dropped out due to health issues.

=== Summer 2024 ===
In June 2024, NOAHFINNCE played Rock For People, his first EU show outside of the UK. He also played Download Festival and Isle of Wight Festival. In July he headlined the second stage of the first ever Bludfest at Milton Keynes Bowl. In August, Adams opened for McFly in Halifax on his birthday, and supported Busted at two shows in Margate and Hitchin in the following weeks.

=== UK Tour 2024 ===
In November 2024, Adams toured the UK for the release of his debut album "Growing Up On The Internet". He played shows in Southampton, Bristol, Birmingham, Glasgow, Manchester, Leeds and London, and was supported by Taylor Acorn and South Arcade.

=== Slam Dunk Festival ===
NOAHFINNCE has performed at Slam Dunk Festival a total of three times, in 2021, 2023, and most recently, in 2025. In 2025, Adams also made surprise appearances during As It Is' set on both days, performing "Can't Save Myself" live with the band.

=== Mr Overwhelm: The Tour ===
In October 2026, NOAHFINNCE toured the UK for the release of his singles "Mr OVERHWLEM", "TOO SENSITIVE" and "WONKY", for his upcoming album "WONKY"

== Awards and nominations ==
Year	Award	Category	Result
2019	Shorty Awards	LGBTQ+ Account	Nominated
2022	Blogosphere Awards	Vlogger of the Year	Won
2024	Celeb Mix Awards	Artist of the Year	Nominated
