= FLG =

FLG may refer to:

- Followers-Led Growth Growth strategy
- Endeavor Air, an American regional airline
- Farmer-Labour Group, a Canadian political party, now the Saskatchewan New Democratic Party
- Flagstaff Pulliam Airport, in Arizona, United States
- Flagstaff station, Arizona
- Filaggrin, encoded by the FLG gene
- Flaming Lotus Girls, an American collaborative art group
- Florida Georgia Line, an American bro-country duo
- Friedhelm Loh Group, a German manufacturing firm
- Friends Life Group, a Guernsey financial firm
- Falun Gong
