= List of Warped Tour lineups by year =

The Vans Warped Tour is a summer music and extreme sports festival that toured annually from 1995 to 2019, and returned in 2025. The following is a comprehensive list of bands that performed on the tour throughout its history.

Band	Total years	1995	1996	1997	1998	1999	2000	2001	2002	2003	2004	2005	2006	2007	2008	2009	2010	2011	2012	2013	2014	2015	2016	2017	2018	2019	2025	2026
'68	1																					✓						
1 Last Chance	1																								✓			
1000 Mona Lisas	1		✓																									
22 Jacks	3		✓	✓	✓																							
311	5		✓		✓			✓																		✓	✓	
36 Crazyfists	3																					✓			✓	✓		
3OH!3	7														✓	✓		✓		✓			✓		✓		✓	
3rd Strike	2							✓	✓																			
5606	1																✓											
6Arelyhuman	1																										✓	
7 Seconds	1					✓																						
7th House	1							✓																				
7th Standard	1									✓																		
8 Graves	1																								✓			
98 Mute	1				✓																							
A+ Dropouts	1																					✓						
A Day to Remember	7											✓			✓	✓		✓			✓					✓	✓	
A Loss for Words	5													✓	✓				✓			✓					✓	
A Lot Like Birds	1																				✓							
A Skylit Drive	2																	✓			✓							
A Static Lullaby	2												✓	✓														
Aaron West and the Roaring Twenties	2																				✓	✓						
Abandon All Ships	1																	✓										
Abriel	1															✓												
The Acacia Strain	2																	✓						✓				
The Academy Is...	3											✓	✓		✓													
Acceptance	5									✓	✓	✓	✓		✓													
ACIDIC	1																				✓							
Action Item	1																			✓								
Adolescents	2													✓			✓							✓				
AFI	4						✓	✓		✓			✓															
After Midnight Project	2															✓	✓											
After the Burial	2																		✓					✓				
Against the Current	1																						✓					
Against Me!	3												✓		✓			✓										
Agent Orange	2													✓			✓											
Agnostic Front	1					✓																						
The Aggrolites	1																	✓										
Aiden	2												✓			✓												
Air Dubai	1																				✓							
Alamance	1																✓											
The Alarm	1																							✓				
Alcoa	1																			✓								
Alesana	3													✓	✓		✓											
Alestorm	1																							✓				
Alexisonfire	1												✓															
Alien Ant Farm	1							✓																				
Alive Like Me	1																				✓	✓						
Tha Alkaholiks	2		✓	✓																								
Alkaline Trio	4								✓		✓			✓			✓											
All	1				✓																							
The All-American Rejects	7							✓		✓		✓					✓									✓	✓	✓
All Systems Go!	1					✓																						
All That Remains	1														✓													
All Time Low	6													✓	✓	✓			✓						✓		✓	
Alligator Gun	1		✓																									
Allison Weiss	2																			✓	✓							
Allister	3								✓		✓	✓																
Allstar Weekend	1																			✓								
The Almost	1													✓														
Alvarez Kings	3																			✓		✓		✓				
AM Taxi	2																✓	✓										
Amazing Royal Crowns	2				✓	✓																						
Amber Pacific	4										✓	✓	✓	✓														
Amigo The Devil	1																										✓	
Amely	1															✓												
Amen	1							✓																				
American Authors	2																						✓	✓				
American Opera	2																			✓		✓						
American Pinup	1																				✓							
The American Scene	1																			✓								
American Sixgun	1																✓											
The Amity Affliction	3																			✓		✓			✓			
Amory	1												✓															
Amplify This	1															✓												
Amyst	1																		✓									
A.N.I.M.A.L.	1						✓																					
Anarbor	4														✓	✓	✓			✓								
Anberlin	3													✓	✓						✓							
And I've Landed	1															✓												
Andrew W.K.	4								✓	✓							✓									✓		
Andy Black	2																							✓		✓		
Angel Du$T	1																										✓	
Angels & Airwaves	1														✓													
Angry Samoans	1																✓											
Animo	1														✓													
Anthony Raneri of Bayside	2																		✓		✓							
Anthrophobia	1					✓																						
Anti-Flag	11					✓	✓		✓		✓		✓			✓	✓	✓	✓					✓		✓		
Antiserum	1																				✓							
Anxiety	1					✓																						
The Apex Theory	1							✓																				
April Chase	1																✓											
The Aquabats	5		✓		✓															✓						✓	✓	
Architects	2														✓					✓								
Area-7	1					✓																						
Ariana and the Rose	1																									✓		
Arkham	3									✓																		
Armor for Sleep	2											✓	✓															
Arrows In Action	1																										✓	
The Arrogant Sons of Bitches	2									✓	✓																	
Art of Shock	1																			✓								
Artist vs. Poet	1																✓											
As Cities Burn	2												✓	✓														
As I Lay Dying	2													✓	✓													
As It Is	3																					✓			✓		✓	
As Tall as Lions	1											✓																
Ascot Royals	1																					✓						
Asking Alexandria	4																	✓				✓			✓		✓	
Assorted Jelly Beans	1																✓											
Assuming We Survive	3																						✓	✓	✓			
The Ataris	8						✓	✓		✓		✓				✓				✓	✓			✓				
A Thorn for Every Heart	1											✓																
Atmosphere	5									✓	✓	✓														✓	✓	
Atomic Fireballs	1				✓																							
Atreyu	3											✓											✓			✓		
Attack Attack!	3															✓	✓	✓										
Attila	5																			✓	✓	✓		✓			✓	
The Audition	1													✓														
August Burns Red	7														✓			✓	✓	✓		✓			✓	✓		
Austin Lucas	1																			✓								
Authority Zero	2														✓										✓			
The Automatic	1													✓														
Automatic Love Letter	2														✓		✓											
Autopilot Off	2								✓		✓																	
Ava Maybee	1																										✓	
Avail	2					✓	✓																					
Avenged Sevenfold	5								✓	✓	✓	✓		✓														
Avion Roe	1																						✓					
Aviva	1																										✓	
Avoid One Thing	1									✓																		
Avril Lavigne	1																										✓	
A Wilhelm Scream	2										✓	✓																
Baby Baby	1																					✓						
Bad Case of Big Mouth	1																			✓								
Bad Cop / Bad Cop	3																					✓		✓		✓		
Bad Rabbits	3																	✓			✓						✓	
Bad Religion	7			✓	✓				✓		✓			✓		✓										✓		
Bad Omens	1																							✓				
Bad Seed Rising	2																						✓	✓				
The Ballroom Charades	1																						✓					
Ballyhoo!	2																		✓				✓					
Bangups	2																		✓	✓								
Barb Wire Dolls	1																							✓				
The Barbarians of California	1																										✓	
Bayside	5												✓	✓		✓			✓		✓							
Beacher's Madhouse	1																✓											
Beartooth	5																			✓	✓	✓		✓	✓			
Beatsteaks	2					✓	✓																					
Beat Union	1														✓													
Beautiful Bodies	2																			✓		✓						
Beauty School Dropout	1																										✓	
Beaverloop	1					✓																						
Bebe Rexha	1																					✓						
Beck	1		✓																									
Bedouin Soundclash	2											✓			✓													
Beebs and Her Money Makers	3																			✓	✓				✓			
Being as an Ocean	2																					✓		✓				
The Benjamins	1							✓																				
Better Lovers	1																										✓	
Better Off	1																				✓							
Between the Trees	1														✓													
Beware of Darkness	1																			✓								
Be Your Own Pet	1														✓													
Bif Naked	2		✓				✓																					
Biffy Clyro	1													✓														
Big Ass Truck	1																										✓	
Big B	1																	✓										
Big Chocolate	2																	✓		✓								
Big D and the Kids Table	8											✓		✓		✓	✓	✓		✓				✓		✓		
Big Drill Car	2														✓	✓												
Bigwig	1							✓																				
Bi-Level	1									✓																		
Billy Idol	1											✓																
Billy Talent	4										✓	✓	✓							✓								
Billy the Kid	1																			✓								
Blackbird	1																				✓							
Black Boots	1																					✓						
Black Box	1															✓												
The Black Dahlia Murder	1																			✓								
The Black Eyed Peas	1					✓																						
Blackfire	1									✓																		
The Black Halos	1							✓																				
Blacklist Royals	1																				✓							
The Black Pacific	1																	✓										
Black Square	1																	✓										
Black Tide	1															✓												
Blacklist Royals	3												✓	✓				✓										
Black President	1														✓													
Black Veil Brides	5																	✓		✓		✓			✓		✓	
Blackbear	1																										✓	
Blameshift	1																				✓							
Blasé Debris	1														✓													
The Bled	3										✓	✓	✓															
The Bleeding Irish	1														✓													
Bleeding Orange	1												✓															
Bleeding Through	1											✓																
Bleed the Dream	4									✓	✓	✓		✓														
Blessthefall	6													✓					✓	✓		✓		✓			✓	
Blink-182	6		✓	✓	✓	✓		✓																		✓		
Blood on the Dance Floor	2																	✓	✓									
Blue Meanies	1		✓																									
Body Count	1																										✓	
Bodyjar	1							✓																				
Bombay Cowtippers	1					✓																						
Borialis	1								✓																			
Born Cages	1																					✓						
Born of Osiris	2																		✓		✓							
Boston Manor	1																							✓				
The BOTS	2																✓	✓										
The Bouncing Souls	8			✓	✓	✓		✓			✓		✓		✓	✓												
Boundaries	1																										✓	
Bowling for Soup	10									✓	✓	✓						✓		✓	✓			✓	✓	✓	✓	
Box Car Racer	1								✓																			
BoyMeetsWorld	1																					✓						
Boysetsfire	2								✓				✓															
Boys Like Girls	2													✓													✓	
Boys Night Out	1											✓																
BR549	1					✓																						
Brand New	1									✓																		
Brass Tackz	1																✓											
Breathe Carolina	4															✓	✓		✓		✓							
Breathe Electric	2															✓	✓											
Brian Marquis	4																		✓	✓	✓	✓						
Britt Black	1												✓															
The Briggs	2													✓	✓													
Bring Me the Horizon	3														✓		✓			✓								
Bryce Vine	1																										✓	
Broadway Calls	1														✓													
Broadside	2																						✓		✓			
BrokeNCYDE	1															✓												
The Bronx	1														✓													
Brothers Of Brazil	1																	✓										
Brubeck	1				✓																							
Buck-O-Nine	3			✓		✓								✓														
Buffalo Casket	1														✓													
Bullet for My Valentine	2												✓										✓					
The Bunny the Bear	1																					✓						
Burning Empires	1																✓											
The Business	1							✓																				
The Burst and Bloom	1																							✓				
Buttons	2																				✓	✓						
Buzzcocks	1												✓															
The Cab	1																✓											
Call the Cops	1																✓											
Callback California	1																✓											
Campaigning For Zeros	1																	✓										
Candiria	1																							✓				
Candy Hearts	2																				✓	✓						
Cane Hill	1																						✓					
Can't Swim	1																									✓		
Capsize	1																						✓					
Capstan	1																								✓			
Captain Capa	2																		✓		✓							
Carolesdaughter	1																										✓	
Carnifex	1																							✓				
Carousel Kings	3																					✓		✓	✓			
Carpool	1																										✓	
Cartel	3											✓	✓														✓	
Casket Architects	1														✓													
Cassadee Pope	1																								✓			
The Casualties	5							✓	✓		✓		✓				✓											
Catch 22	1							✓																				
CatchingYourClouds	1																		✓									
Chained Saint	1																										✓	
Chali 2na & Cut Chemist	1																									✓		
Champagne Champagne	1																		✓									
Chandler Leighton	1																										✓	
Charged GBH	1														✓													
The Chariot	2													✓						✓								
Charlie Simpson	1																			✓								
Charlotte Sands	1																										✓	
Charlotte Sometimes	2														✓					✓								
Chase Atlantic	1																								✓			
Chase Long Beach	1																✓											
Chase Walker Band	2																			✓	✓							
Chelsea Grin	4																		✓		✓		✓		✓			
Cherri Bomb	1																		✓									
Cherry Poppin' Daddies	1				✓																							
Chiodos	7												✓	✓	✓	✓			✓	✓							✓	
The Chop Tops	2											✓	✓															
Chuck Ragan of Hot Water Music	1																		✓									
Chunk! No, Captain Chunk	3																		✓		✓		✓					
ChrisB	1																					✓						
Chronic Future	1										✓																	
Cigar	1				✓																							
Cinder Road	1														✓													
Cinematic Sunrise	2													✓	✓													
Circa Survive	3											✓		✓												✓		
Circle Jerks	1													✓														
Citizen	3												✓							✓		✓						
CIV	3	✓	✓		✓																							
City of Ghosts	1																			✓								
TheCityShakeUp	2																			✓	✓							
CKY	5					✓	✓																	✓		✓	✓	
The Classic Crime	1														✓													
The Cleopatra Complex	1																			✓								
Cliffdiver	1																										✓	
Close Your Eyes	1																				✓							
Closure in Moscow	1																✓											
Cobra Starship	2														✓												✓	
Coheed and Cambria	3									✓	✓			✓														
Coldrain	1																						✓					
Cold Forty Three	2																	✓	✓									
Cold Fusion	1														✓													
The Color Fred	1														✓													
The Color Morale	2																				✓		✓					
Columbyne	2																✓	✓										
Comeback Kid	1																										✓	
Common Sage	1																										✓	
Common Sense	1					✓																						
The Confession	1													✓														
Confide	3														✓		✓									✓		
Continental	1																	✓										
The Constellations	1																		✓									
Count the Stars	1									✓																		
Counterparts	1																							✓				
Courage My Love	3																			✓	✓			✓				
Corrin Campbell	2																				✓	✓						
Craig Owens	1																			✓								
Crashcarburn	1														✓													
Creeper	1																							✓				
Crime in Stereo	1														✓													
Crizzly	2																			✓	✓							
Crossfaith	2																			✓		✓						
Crown the Empire	5																			✓	✓		✓		✓		✓	
Crowned King	1													✓														
Cruel Hand	1																						✓					
Crumb	1				✓																							
Culture Shock Camp	1														✓													
Cursed Sails	1																				✓							
Cute Is What We Aim For	2													✓							✓							
Cypress Hill	1					✓																						
D12	1							✓																				
Dakoda Motor Co.	1		✓																									
The Damned	1								✓																			
Damone	1									✓																		
Dance Gavin Dance	4															✓		✓						✓		✓		
Dance Hall Crashers	2		✓																								✓	
The Dance Party	1																	✓										
Dangerkids	1																				✓							
Danger Radio	1														✓													
The Dangerous Summer	1																	✓										
Danielle Barbe	1																		✓									
Dante	1														✓													
The Dark	1																										✓	
Darkest Hour	1											✓																
The Darlings	1																		✓									
Dash | Ten	1																						✓					
Dayseeker	1																								✓			
DC Fallout	1																	✓										
The Dead 60s	1											✓																
Dead by Wednesday	1																								✓			
Dead Cat Lounge	1																	✓										
Dead Girls Academy	2																							✓	✓			
Dead Legend	1														✓													
Dead Sara	1																		✓									
Deadly Apples	2																								✓	✓		
The Dear & Departed	1													✓														
Dear and the Headlights	1															✓												
Death Before Dishonor	1												✓															
Deathbyromy	1																										✓	
Deez Nuts	1																								✓			
Def Con Dos	1				✓																							
Defeater	1																			✓								
Deftones	3	✓	✓		✓																							
Dem Atlas	1																									✓		
Demerit	1																	✓										
Descendents	1			✓																								
Destroy Boys	1																										✓	
DeRoot	1							✓																				
Deviates	4					✓	✓	✓	✓																			
The Devil Wears Prada	4														✓	✓		✓			✓							
Dewayne	1																										✓	
Desperation Squad	1													✓														
Dexter And The Moonrocks	1																										✓	
D.I.	1														✓													
Dick Dale	1		✓																									
The Dickies	5													✓	✓	✓	✓							✓				
Die' Hunns	1												✓															
Die Toten Hosen	1				✓																							
The Dillinger Escape Plan	3						✓					✓			✓		✓											
Dimestore Hoods	2	✓	✓																									
Dirty Heads	1																									✓		
The Dirty Nil	1																					✓						
Discipline	1					✓																						
Disco Ensemble	1														✓													
The Distillers	1							✓																				
District 7	1								✓																			
Divided by Friday	1																		✓									
Divided Heaven	1																				✓							
DJ Nicola Bear	1																				✓							
DJ Scout	1																				✓							
Dodger	1														✓													
Does It Offend You, Yeah?	1														✓													
Dog Eat Dog	1		✓																									
Doll Skin	2																							✓	✓			
The Dollyrots	1																									✓		
Don Broco	1																								✓			
The Donnas	1						✓																					
Doozer	1									✓																		
The Doped Up Dollies	1																									✓		
Dose of Adolescence	1																			✓								
Double XL	1													✓														
Down by Law	1		✓																									
Drain	1																										✓	
Drama Club	1																					✓						
Dr. Madd Vibe	1												✓															
Dr. Manhattan	1														✓													
Drive A	1														✓													
Driver Friendly	1																			✓								
Drop Dead, Gorgeous	1													✓														
Dropkick Murphys	7				✓	✓		✓		✓		✓					✓										✓	
D.R.U.G.S.	1																	✓										
Drug Church	1																										✓	
Destruction Made Simple	1									✓																		
Dub Pistols	1							✓																				
The Dukes	1																							✓				
Dustin Jones and the Rising Tide	1																		✓									
Dye	1																										✓	
The Early November	5								✓	✓	✓		✓							✓								
Echo Movement	1																		✓									
Echosmith	3																			✓	✓				✓			
Eden Row	1										✓																	
Edreys	1														✓													
Eidola	1																								✓			
Eighteen Visions	2										✓		✓															
Eightyonedays	1										✓																	
Ekoh	1																										✓	
El Centro	2							✓																			✓	
Elder Brother	2																				✓					✓		
Electric Touch	1																	✓										
Eli Olsberg	1																					✓						
Emarosa	3																✓					✓	✓					
Emery	3											✓	✓													✓		
Emilie Autumn	1																				✓							
Emily's Army	2																		✓	✓								
Eminem	1					✓																						
Emmure	3															✓	✓							✓				
Energy	1												✓															
Enough Already	1																						✓					
Enter Shikari	4																✓	✓			✓						✓	
Entice	1														✓													
Envy on the Coast	1													✓														
Escape the Fate	5												✓	✓		✓						✓					✓	
Esham	1							✓																				
Eternal Boy	1																							✓				
Evaline	1													✓														
Evelynn	1																	✓										
Evergreen Terrace	1													✓														
Every Avenue	3														✓	✓		✓										
Every Time I Die	8								✓				✓		✓		✓		✓		✓		✓		✓			
The Expendables	2																	✓									✓	
The Explosion	2							✓				✓																
The Exposed	2																	✓		✓								
The Eyeliners	2								✓		✓																	
Eyes Set to Kill	3																✓	✓								✓		
The Fabulous Rudies	4											✓	✓	✓			✓											
Face to Face	6	✓	✓	✓						✓							✓									✓		
Face the King	1																				✓							
Fall from Grace	1														✓													
The Fall of Troy	3											✓		✓		✓												
Fall Out Boy	2										✓	✓																
Falling in Reverse	7																	✓	✓		✓		✓	✓	✓		✓	
Falling Through April	2																				✓	✓						
False Puppet	1																					✓						
Fame On Fire	1																										✓	
Family Force 5	4													✓	✓			✓				✓						
The Fantastic Plastics	1																							✓				
Far	1		✓																									
Farewell	1														✓													
Farewell Winters	2																							✓	✓			
Farmer Boys	1				✓																							
Fat	1			✓																								
Fea	1																									✓		
Fear	3							✓						✓	✓													
Fear Before the March of Flames	1										✓																	
Fear Nuttin' Band	1														✓													
Feeki	1																							✓				
Fenix TX	4					✓	✓	✓																	✓			
Fever 333	1																										✓	
The Figgs	1		✓																									
The Fight	1											✓																
Fight Fair	1																✓											
Fight Fight Fight	1														✓													
The Fighting Jacks	1										✓																	
Final Summation	1											✓																
Finch	2								✓												✓							
Fire from the Gods	1																							✓				
Fireworks	1																		✓									
First to Eleven	1																						✓					
Fishbone	4		✓											✓												✓	✓	
Fit for a King	3																				✓	✓		✓				
Five Iron Frenzy	1								✓																			
Five Knives	1																			✓								
The F-Ups	1										✓																	
Flashlight Brown	6			✓	✓		✓	✓	✓	✓																		
The Flatliners	5												✓	✓	✓	✓	✓											
Flogging Molly	7						✓	✓	✓	✓	✓			✓		✓												
Florence	1												✓															
Fluf	2	✓	✓																									
Flycatcher	1																										✓	
The Fold	2													✓				✓										
For All Those Sleeping	1																				✓							
For the Foxes	1																			✓								
For Today	2																		✓		✓							
Forever Came Calling	2																✓			✓								
Forever the Sickest Kids	4													✓	✓		✓			✓								
Forget Me in Vegas	1																	✓										
Four	1				✓																							
Four Year Strong	8														✓				✓		✓	✓	✓		✓	✓	✓	
Foxy Shazam	1																	✓										
Frank Iero & the Future Violents	1																									✓		
Frank Turner	1																								✓			
Frenzal Rhomb	2				✓	✓																						
Freshman 15	1																	✓										
From Ashes to New	2																						✓				✓	
From Autumn to Ashes	4								✓	✓	✓		✓															
From First to Last	4										✓	✓	✓		✓													
Front Porch Step	1																				✓							
Fu Manchu	1				✓																							
Full on the Mouth	1				✓																							
Funeral for a Friend	2											✓		✓														
Funeral Party	1																		✓									
The Funeral Portrait	1																										✓	
Futuristic	1																							✓				
G-Eazy	1																		✓									
Gabe Kubanda	1																			✓								
Gallows	2													✓		✓												
Game Changer Wrestling	1																								✓			
Games We Play	1																										✓	
Garzi	1																										✓	
Gaslight Anthem	1														✓													
Gatsby's American Dream	3											✓	✓					✓										
GBH	1														✓													
Germs	2												✓		✓													
Get Scared	1																				✓							
The Get Up Kids	1				✓																							
The Ghost Inside	2																		✓		✓							
Ghost Town	2																				✓		✓					
Gideon	2																						✓				✓	
Gil Mantera's Party Dream	1														✓													
The Gilligans	1								✓																			
Gin Wigmore	2																			✓							✓	
Girlfriends	1																										✓	
Glassjaw	3								✓	✓																✓		
Go Betty Go	2											✓														✓		
Go Crash Audio	1													✓														
Go Jimmy Go	1										✓																	
Go Radio	2																	✓		✓								
Gob	4				✓	✓	✓		✓																			
Godsmack	1				✓																							
Gogol Bordello	2										✓																✓	
Going Second	2										✓	✓																
Goldfinger	4		✓						✓											✓				✓			✓	
Goldhouse	1																			✓								
Good Charlotte	8							✓	✓		✓	✓											✓	✓	✓	✓		
Good Guys in Black	1																	✓										
Good Riddance	4	✓				✓	✓																				✓	
The Goodwill	1									✓																		
The Gospel Youth	1																							✓				
The Grabbers	1	✓																										
Grade	1							✓																				
The Graduate	1												✓															
Grand Theft Audio	1							✓																				
Gratitude	1											✓																
Gravas	1																										✓	
Grave Secrets	1																										✓	
Grayscale	1																								✓			
Greek Fire	2																		✓	✓								
Greeley Estates	3											✓	✓		✓													
The Green	1																		✓									
Green Day	1						✓																					
Green Jellÿ	1																✓											
Greg Wood	1									✓																		
Grey Gordon	1																					✓						
Grieves with Budo	1																	✓										
Grinspoon	1					✓																						
The Gufs	1													✓														
Gus Thè Savagè	1																										✓	
Guttermouth	7	✓	✓		✓			✓	✓		✓					✓												
Gwar	1																							✓				
Gwyllions	1					✓																						
Gym Class Heroes	5											✓	✓		✓			✓									✓	
H Is Orange	1										✓																	
Haarper	1																										✓	
Hail the Sun	3																						✓		✓		✓	
H-Blockx	1					✓																						
Halifax	1											✓																
Hanabie.	1																										✓	
Handguns	2																			✓		✓						
Hands Like Houses	3																			✓		✓		✓				
Hank3 and Assjack	1							✓																				
Harm's Way	1																								✓			
Haste the Day	1													✓														
Hatebreed	3				✓																			✓	✓			
Have Mercy	1																					✓						
Hawthorne Heights	6											✓		✓						✓				✓		✓	✓	
Heart to Heart	1																				✓							
He Is Legend	1											✓																
Head Automatica	1																										✓	
Heart Attack Man	1																										✓	
Hed PE	1			✓																								
The Heirs	1																						✓					
Hello Atlantic	1																							✓				
Hello Beautiful	1															✓												
Hellogoodbye	2												✓					✓										
Helmet	1												✓															
Hepcat	3			✓	✓		✓																					
Her Leather Jacket	1																										✓	
Here Comes the Kraken	1																											✓
Heritage	1																			✓								
Hesher	1							✓																				
Hey Monday	1																✓											
Hi-Standard	1				✓																							
Hidden in Plain View	3											✓														✓	✓	
HiFi Handgrenades	1														✓													
The Higher	1														✓													
High School Football Heroes	4									✓	✓	✓	✓															
The Hippos	1					✓	✓																					
His Dream of Lions	1																							✓				
Hit the Lights	3											✓	✓			✓												
Ho9909	1																										✓	
Holding Absence	1																										✓	
Holywatr	1																										✓	
Home Grown	2				✓				✓																			
The Home Team	1																										✓	
Home Town Hero	1							✓																				
Honey Revenge	1																										✓	
Honor Bright	1														✓													
Hope	1								✓																			
Hoobastank	1																											✓
Hopesfall	1											✓																
Horrorpops	2											✓			✓													
Hostage Calm	1																		✓									
Hot Chelle Rae	1																											✓
Hot Milk	1																										✓	
Hot Rod Circuit	2											✓		✓														
Hot Water Music	2						✓		✓																			
H_{2}O	5			✓	✓	✓		✓																		✓		
Huddy	1																										✓	
The Human Abstract	2													✓	✓													
Hundredth	2																					✓		✓				
Hunter Revenge	1														✓													
Hunter Valentine	1																				✓							
The Hurt Process	1										✓																	
Hyro the Hero	2																		✓							✓		
I Against I	1					✓																						
I Am the Avalanche	3												✓						✓								✓	
I Am Ghost	1													✓														
I Call Fives	1																		✓									
I Can Make a Mess	1																			✓								
I Fight Dragons	2																		✓		✓							
I in Team	1									✓																		
I Killed the Prom Queen	1																					✓						
I Prevail	1																							✓				
I Set My Friends on Fire	2															✓		✓										
I See Stars	4																✓			✓			✓				✓	
I, the Breather	1																				✓							
I the Mighty	2																				✓					✓		
Iann Dior	1																										✓	
Ice Nine Kills	5																			✓	✓		✓		✓		✓	
Ice-T	2					✓																					✓	
Icon for Hire	2																				✓	✓						
Idkhow	1																										✓	
illScarlett	2													✓				✓										
Ima Robot	1										✓																	
Immortal Technique	1											✓																
Impending Doom	1																		✓									
In Hearts Wake	2																						✓		✓			
The Heathens	1									✓																		
In This Moment	1															✓												
Indigo Forever	1																										✓	
Incubus	2				✓																			✓				
The Indecent	1																			✓								
Indofin	1				✓																							
InnerPartySystem	1															✓												
Insomniac	1																					✓						
Insane Clown Posse	7		✓	✓	✓	✓	✓				✓																✓	
Inspection 12	1							✓																				
The (International) Noise Conspiracy	1										✓																	
The Interrupters	3																						✓		✓		✓	
Into Another	1	✓																										
Into It. Over It.	1																		✓									
Ionia	2																	✓	✓									
Isles	1																					✓						
Issues	4																			✓	✓		✓		✓			
It Boys!	2																	✓	✓									
It Dies Today	1													✓														
It's Pouring on Our Heads	5								✓	✓	✓	✓	✓															
Itch	1																			✓								
Ivens	1														✓													
Ivoryline	2												✓			✓												
Ivy League	2																✓	✓										
Iwrestledabearonce	2																✓		✓									
Jack Kays	1																										✓	
Jacky Jasper	2					✓		✓																				
Jack's Mannequin	2														✓			✓										
Jager Henry	1																										✓	
Jakobs Castle	1																										✓	
Jalopy	1		✓																									
James Morris	1																					✓						
Jawbreaker	1																									✓		
Jay Tea	1												✓															
Jaya the Cat	1							✓																				
Jdn	1																										✓	
Jeffree Star	2														✓	✓												
Jeremy Romance & The Zero Friends Club	1																										✓	
Jersey	1							✓																				
Jet Lag Gemini	2														✓	✓												
Jimmy Eat World	3					✓		✓	✓																			
Jimmy 2 Times	1			✓																								
Joan Jett and the Blackhearts	2												✓												✓			
Joey Briggs	1																			✓								
Johnnie Guilbert	1																										✓	
The Johnstones	3												✓	✓	✓													
The Jukebox Romantics	1																		✓									
Jule Vera	2																					✓		✓				
The Juliana Theory	1							✓																				
Julia Wolf	1																										✓	
Juliette and the Licks	1											✓																
Jumping Monks	2									✓	✓																	
June	1												✓															
June Divided	1																		✓									
The Junior Varsity	2											✓	✓															
Just Surrender	1														✓													
Jutes	1																										✓	
Jurassic 5	2						✓	✓																				
Justina Valentine	1																		✓		✓							
K.Flay	1																				✓							
K-os	1													✓														
Kaddisfly	1													✓														
Kairo Kingdom	1																			✓								
Kaiser Solzie	1																								✓			
Kaleido	2																								✓	✓		
Kami Kehoe	1																										✓	
Karate High School	2												✓	✓														
The Karma Killers	1																					✓						
Katy Perry	1														✓													
Kaya Stewart	1																					✓						
Keep Flying	1																									✓		
The Kenneths	1																					✓						
Kennyhoopla	1																										✓	
Kevin Seconds	1																			✓								
Kid Rock	1				✓																							
Killswitch Engage	2													✓													✓	
Kiros	1											✓																
Kitsch	1				✓																							
Knocked Loose	2																							✓	✓			
The Know How	5						✓	✓	✓	✓		✓																
Knuckle Puck	4																					✓	✓		✓		✓	
Koji	2																		✓			✓						
Korn	1																								✓			
Koo Koo Kanga Roo	1																					✓						
Kool Keith	1							✓																				
Kosha Dillz	1																					✓						
Kottonmouth Kings	1						✓																					
Koyo	1																										✓	
Kristopher Roe	1																		✓									
Kublai Khan	1																								✓			
L7	1	✓																										
Lacey Sturm	1																											
Lagwagon	3	✓		✓					✓																			
Lakeshore	1																							✓				
Landon Barker	1																										✓	
Large Marge	1										✓																	
Larry And His Flask	1																	✓										
Lars Frederiksen and the Bastards	1										✓																	
Last Great Assault	1														✓													
Latex Generation	2			✓	✓																							
The Lawrence Arms	1										✓																	
L.E.S. Stitches	1				✓																							
Le Castle Vania	1																					✓						
Leatherface	1					✓																						
Lee Corey Oswald	1																					✓						
Left To Suffer	1																										✓	
Less Than Jake	17			✓	✓	✓	✓	✓		✓	✓		✓			✓		✓	✓		✓		✓		✓	✓	✓	✓
letlive.	2																			✓							✓	
The Letters Organize	1											✓																
Letter Kills	2									✓	✓																	
L.I.F.T	1																								✓			
Liars Inc.	1							✓																				
Life on the Sideline	1																				✓							
Light Years	1																				✓							
Lighterburns	1																								✓			
LIGHTS	1																✓											
Like Moths to Flames	1																			✓								
Like Pacific	1																						✓					
Lil Lotus	1																										✓	
Lil Toe (Ammo)	1																										✓	
Lillix	1								✓																			
Lillotus	1																										✓	
Limp Bizkit	3		✓	✓																					✓			
Linkin Park	1																				✓							✓
Lionize	2																	✓			✓							
Lionz of Zion	1																			✓								
Lit	1					✓																						
Little-T and One Track Mike	1							✓																				
LiveonRelease	1									✓																		
The Living End	4				✓	✓		✓					✓															
Living With Lions	1																		✓									
Lo-Ball	1							✓																				
Lo Presher	2		✓	✓																								
Lolo	1																										✓	
Long Beach Dub Allstars	2						✓	✓																				
Longway	1															✓												
Look What I Did	1													✓														
Looking Up	1					✓																						
Lordz of Brooklyn (The Lordz)	8	✓			✓		✓								✓	✓			✓			✓			✓			
Loser's Luck	2										✓	✓																
The Lost Boys	1																				✓							
Lost City Angels	1							✓																				
Lost In Atlantis	1																			✓								
Lost In Society	2																		✓		✓							
Lost Point	1														✓													
Lostprophets	1																		✓									
Love Equals Death	3											✓	✓		✓													
Lucero	1																	✓										
Luckie Strike	3						✓	✓	✓																			
Ludo	3												✓	✓	✓													
Lunachicks	1						✓																					
M4Sonic	1																					✓						
Mac Lethal	1																			✓								
Magnolia Park	1																										✓	
Machine Gun Kelly	2																		✓								✓	
Machree	1																	✓										
Macy Kate	1																					✓						
Mad Caddies	3				✓		✓			✓																		
Madcap	1							✓																				
Madchild	1																			✓								
Madina Lake	3														✓	✓		✓										
Mae	2										✓	✓																
Maggie Schneider	1																								✓			
The Maine	7													✓	✓	✓					✓		✓		✓		✓	
The Mainliners	1																										✓	
Major League	1																					✓						
Make Do and Mend	1																		✓									
Makeout	3																				✓	✓			✓			
Mallory Knox	1																					✓						
Man Overboard	4																		✓	✓		✓				✓		
The Managers	1				✓																							
Mandolyn Mae	1																			✓								
Manic Hispanic	2								✓					✓														
Manic Sewing Circle	2												✓	✓														
Mariachi El Bronx	1																										✓	
Marina City	1																						✓					
Marissa Mishelle	1														✓													
Maryjo	1																										✓	
Marmozets	1																				✓							
Masked Intruder	1																						✓					
Massive Monkees	1														✓													
Matchbook Romance	4									✓	✓	✓										✓						
The Matches	3										✓	✓		✓														
Matisyahu	1														✓													
Matt Butler	1																									✓		
Matt Embree	1																			✓								
Matt Toka	1																		✓									
Maxeen	1									✓																		
Mayday Parade	7													✓	✓		✓		✓		✓		✓		✓			
Maylene & The Sons Of Disaster	2													✓	✓													
MC Chris	3													✓	✓						✓							
MC Lars	3																			✓		✓				✓		
MC Lars with Weerd Science	2																	✓	✓									
McDougall	1																			✓								
Medium Troy	1														✓													
Me First and the Gimme Gimmes	2							✓		✓																		
Me Like Bees	1																				✓							
Meg & Dia	3													✓		✓										✓		
Megg	1																										✓	
Meghann Wright	1																					✓						
The Meices	1		✓																									
Mel	1				✓																							
Memphis May Fire	6																		✓	✓		✓		✓		✓	✓	
The Menzingers	2																	✓								✓		
Messer	1																								✓			
Mest	4									✓		✓								✓					✓			
Metro Station	1																					✓						
MewithoutYou	1												✓															
Mgna Crrrta	1																										✓	
M.I.A.	1														✓													
Microwave	2																							✓			✓	
Middleground	1								✓																			
Middle Class Rut	1																	✓										
Middle Finger Salute	3														✓	✓				✓								
Midnight To Twelve	1														✓													
Midtown	3							✓	✓	✓																		
MI6	1								✓																			
The Mighty Mighty Bosstones	5		✓	✓	✓		✓		✓																			
Mighty Mongo	2																		✓	✓								
Mike Herrera	1																				✓							
Mike Posner	1																✓											
Mike Watt + The Missingmen	1														✓													
Millencolin	3			✓			✓					✓																
Millionaires	2															✓											✓	
Miracle Dolls	1														✓													
The Misfits	1							✓																				
Miss May I	4																	✓	✓			✓					✓	
Mixtapes	2																			✓	✓							
Mo Bigsley	1														✓													
Mod Sun	4																		✓		✓	✓					✓	
Moe Pope	1														✓													
Mog Stunt Team	1			✓																								
Mojo Morgan	1																	✓										
Molotov	1					✓																						
Moments in Grace	1										✓																	
Mom Jeans	1																										✓	
Moneen	1												✓															
Montage	1																							✓				
Monte Pittman	1																			✓								
Monty Are I	2													✓		✓												
Moose Blood	1																					✓						
More to Monroe	1																						✓					
Morgan Heritage	2						✓	✓																				
Morning After	2						✓	✓																				
Most Precious Blood	4									✓	✓	✓	✓															
Mother Feather	1																						✓					
Motion City Soundtrack	11								✓	✓	✓	✓	✓		✓	✓	✓			✓		✓					✓	
Motionless in White	9											✓		✓	✓		✓	✓	✓		✓		✓		✓			
Mouth Culture	1																										✓	
Movements	3																							✓	✓		✓	
The Movielife	1								✓																			
Moving Mountains	1																	✓										
Mr. Mirainga	1		✓																									
Muckhole	1				✓																							
The Muffs	1						✓																					
Municipal Waste	1																							✓				
Murder City Devils	1			✓																								
Mushroomhead	1		✓																									
Mutemath	1												✓															
MxPx	5				✓		✓		✓			✓		✓														
My American Heart	2											✓		✓														
My Arcadia	1																	✓										
My Chemical Romance	2										✓	✓																
MyChildren MyBride	1																								✓			
My Head	1		✓																									
My Heart Might Explode	1																							✓				
Naked Walrus	2																				✓			✓				
Napoleon Blown Apart	1				✓																							
Narrow Head	1																										✓	
The Narrative	1																	✓										
Near Miss	1											✓																
Neck Deep	5																				✓	✓	✓	✓		✓		
Nekrogoblikon	1																								✓			
Neo Geo	2																	✓	✓									
N.E.R.D	1								✓																			
Never Shout Never	4																✓			✓		✓		✓				
New Atlantic	2																			✓		✓						
New Beat Fund	2																			✓		✓						
New Empire	2																		✓	✓								
New Found Glory	7						✓	✓	✓		✓			✓					✓				✓		✓			
The New Low	1																						✓					
The New Sincerity	1												✓															
New Years Day	7													✓			✓	✓		✓		✓		✓			✓	
Nick Santino	1																				✓							
Night Argent	2																					✓	✓					
Night Riots	1																					✓						
NiT GriT	1																				✓							
No Bragging Rights	1																			✓								
No Doubt	2	✓					✓																					
NOFX	8		✓		✓		✓		✓		✓		✓			✓										✓		
No Man's Land	2									✓	✓																	
No Motiv	1							✓																				
Noelle Sucks	1																										✓	
Nonpoint	1											✓																
Norma Jean	2													✓	✓													
Not Enough Space	1																										✓	
Nothing, Nowhere.	1																										✓	
No Use for a Name	4	✓			✓				✓			✓																
Not Ur Girlfrenz	1																									✓		
Nothington	1													✓														
Now On	1														✓													
Nova Twins	1																										✓	
Obtik	1							✓																				
Oceana	1														✓													
Oceans Ate Alaska	1																						✓					
Of Mice & Men	5																✓	✓	✓		✓						✓	
Off!	1																									✓		
The Offspring	2											✓														✓		
Oh No Fiasco	1																		✓									
Oh, Sleeper	1																			✓								
Old Wounds	1																						✓					
On Broken Wings	1												✓															
On The Surface	1														✓													
The Ones You Forgot	1																									✓		
Onward, Etc.	1																					✓						
Oneyedjacks	1											✓																
One Last Shot	5																							✓				
One Man Army	2						✓			✓																		
One Minute Silence	2					✓	✓																					
One Ok Rock	2																				✓					✓		
Only Crime	1													✓														
Orange 9mm	3	✓		✓		✓																						
Oreskaband	1														✓													
Origami Angel	1																										✓	
Othello	1														✓													
Our Last Night	2																					✓		✓				
Outasight	1																			✓								
Over It	3										✓	✓	✓															
Owen Plant	2																		✓	✓								
Oxymorrons	2																									✓	✓	
Ozma	1								✓																			
Ozomatli	2				✓																					✓		
P.O.S	1															✓												
Pacific Dub	2																			✓	✓							
Paige Wood	1														✓													
Palaye Royale	2																						✓		✓			
Palisades	1																					✓						
Panima	1														✓													
Papa Roach	1						✓																					
The Paradox	1																										✓	
The Paranoyds	1																										✓	
Paramore	6											✓	✓	✓	✓	✓		✓										
Parkway Drive	3													✓			✓				✓							
Passafire	1																	✓										
Patent Pending	1														✓													
Pathway To Providence	1												✓															
Pato	1														✓													
Peelander-Z	1																	✓										
Pendleton	1													✓														
Pennywise	11		✓	✓	✓	✓		✓		✓				✓	✓		✓								✓		✓	
People R Ugly	1																										✓	
Pepper	6							✓		✓	✓			✓				✓					✓					
Permanent Bastards	1																	✓										
Peter DiStefano	1														✓													
Peter McPoland and the Haps	1																									✓		
Phathom	4												✓	✓	✓	✓												
Phinehas	1																								✓			
The Photo Atlas	1													✓														
Picturesque	1																								✓			
Pierce the Veil	4														✓		✓		✓			✓						
The Pietasters	2				✓	✓																						
The Pinker Tones	1														✓													
The Pink Slips	1																						✓					
The Pink Spiders	3												✓		✓											✓		
Piotta	1														✓													
Pistolita	2												✓	✓														
PJ Bond	1																				✓							
Places And Numbers	1																	✓										
Places to Park	1									✓																		
Plague Vendor	2																				✓					✓		
Plain White T's	4											✓	✓											✓			✓	
The Planet Smashers	1																	✓										
Plastique	1				✓																							
Playboy Manbaby	1																							✓				
PlayRadioPlay	1													✓														
Point North	1																										✓	
Poison the Well	2									✓				✓														
Polar Bear Club	1																		✓									
Porn Flakes	1					✓																						
Portrait of Poverty	1				✓																							
Pour Habit	1																	✓										
Preston	1											✓																
Pressure 4-5	1							✓																				
The Pretty Reckless	1																✓											
The Prissteens	1				✓																							
Prof	1																						✓					
Prophets of Rage	2																								✓	✓		
Protein	1			✓																								
Protest The Hero	3												✓	✓	✓													
The Protomen	1																				✓							
Psycho White	1																			✓								
Psychotic 4	1												✓															
Pucker Up	1																										✓	
Pull The Pin	1														✓													
Punk Rock Karaoke	1				✓																							
PUP	1																					✓						
PVRIS	4																			✓	✓	✓	✓					
Quarashi	1								✓																			
Quicksand	2	✓																								✓		
Railroad To Alaska	2																	✓	✓									
Rain City Drive	1																										✓	
Rancid	3				✓			✓		✓																		
The Randies	1														✓													
Rapid Decline	1																	✓										
RDGLDGRN	1																			✓								
The Ready Set	3																	✓			✓	✓						
The Real McKenzies	1				✓																							
Real Friends	4																			✓	✓		✓		✓			
Real McKenzies	1													✓														
The Receiving End of Sirens	1											✓																
Reckless Serenade	1																						✓					
The Recovering	1														✓													
Red Car Wire	1														✓													
Red Five	2	✓	✓																									
The Red Jumpsuit Apparatus	5											✓	✓	✓											✓		✓	
Reel Big Fish	11		✓	✓	✓				✓						✓	✓	✓			✓			✓		✓	✓		
Reggie and the Full Effect	1											✓																
Rehab	1							✓																				
The Relapse Symphony	1																					✓						
Relient K	4											✓			✓			✓		✓								
Remsa and Event	1													✓														
The Republic of Wolves	1																					✓						
Rev 9	1									✓																		
Reverend Horton Heat	1				✓																							
The Reverend Peyton's Big Damn Band	1																								✓			
Revolution Mother	2													✓	✓													
Riff Raff	1																					✓						
R I L E Y	2																								✓	✓		
Ringpop!	1																										✓	
Rise Against	5									✓	✓		✓		✓				✓									
Rise To Remain	1																		✓									
Rivals	1																								✓			
The Riverboat Gamblers	2											✓												✓				
River City Extension	1																	✓										
River City High	1							✓																				
River City Rebels	1							✓																				
Rivers Monroe	1																					✓						
Roam	1																						✓					
Rob Lynch	1																				✓							
Rocket from the Crypt	1		✓																									
The Rocket Summer	2													✓			✓											
Roger Miret and the Disasters	1											✓																
Rogue's March	1							✓																				
Rollins Band	1							✓																				
Roses Are Red	2										✓	✓																
Royal & The Serpent	1																										✓	
Royal Crown Revue	3			✓	✓	✓																						
Rufio	3									✓	✓	✓																
Run DMT	1																			✓								
Rx Bandits	1								✓																			
Ryan Cassata	1																			✓								
Sace6	1																										✓	
Safe To Say	1																						✓					
Saint Alvia	1														✓													
The Salads	4										✓	✓	✓	✓														
Samiam	1		✓																									
Sammy Adams	1																							✓				
Sarah and the Safe Word	1																							✓				
Save Face	1																									✓		
Save Ferris	4				✓		✓																	✓		✓		
Saves the Day	3						✓						✓								✓							
Saosin	3											✓				✓											✓	
Saturdays At Your Place	1																										✓	
Saving Grace	1															✓												
Say Anything	1														✓													
Say No More	1														✓													
SayWeCanFly	2																					✓	✓					
Say When	1															✓												
Scare Don't Fear	1																				✓							
Scary Kids Scaring Kids	4											✓		✓		✓											✓	
Scene Queen	1																										✓	
The Scissors	1																		✓									
Seaway	1																					✓						
Seaweed	1	✓																										
Secret Broadcast	1													✓														
The Scenery	1														✓													
SECRETS	3																			✓	✓		✓					
Selfish Sons	1																										✓	
Send Request	2																				✓			✓				
Senses Fail	8										✓	✓	✓			✓			✓			✓			✓		✓	
Sense Field	3	✓	✓																					✓				
Separations	1																							✓				
Set It Off	5																			✓		✓	✓		✓	✓		
Set Your Goals	7													✓	✓		✓	✓				✓	✓			✓		
Settings	1														✓													
Sevendust	1					✓																						
Sexpod	1		✓																									
Shad	1															✓												
Sharks	1																	✓										
Sharptooth	1																								✓			
Shattered Sun	1																							✓				
The Sheds	2																	✓		✓								
Shinobi Ninja	2																	✓			✓							
Shira	1																	✓										
Shiragirl	7										✓	✓	✓								✓	✓			✓	✓		
Shooter Jennings	1															✓												
Shot In The Dark	1																				✓							
Showoff	1							✓																				
Shut Up And Deal	1																	✓										
Shwayze	1														✓													
Shy KidX	1																			✓								
Sick City	1														✓													
Sick of It All	3	✓		✓																				✓				
Sick of Sarah	2																	✓	✓									
Silent Planet	3																						✓	✓		✓		
Silly Goose	1																										✓	
The Silver Comet	1																		✓									
Silverstein	11										✓	✓	✓			✓			✓	✓		✓		✓	✓	✓	✓	
Simple Plan	14					✓	✓	✓	✓	✓	✓	✓					✓	✓	✓			✓			✓	✓	✓	
Sing It Loud	1															✓												
Single File	2												✓		✓													
Sirens and Sailors	1																					✓						
Six Feet Under	1						✓																					
Skarhead	1						✓																					
The Skatalites	1																									✓		
Skating Polly	1																									✓		
Skavoovie and the Epitones	1				✓																							
Skeet Skeet	1														✓													
Skindred	1											✓																
Skinny Lister	1																		✓									
Skip The Foreplay	1																		✓									
Sky Eats Airplane	1														✓													
The Slackers	1																									✓		
Slaughter To Prevail	1																										✓	
Slaves	1																					✓						
Sleep On It	1																								✓			
Sleeper Agent	1																				✓							
Sleeper Set Sail	1											✓																
The Sleeping	1												✓															
Sleeping with Sirens	6																		✓	✓	✓	✓	✓			✓		
Sleepwalker	1																		✓									
Slick Shoes	1									✓																		
Slightly Stoopid	1							✓																				
Slimer	1					✓																						
Sloth	1				✓																							
Small Talks	1																								✓ |			
The Smashup	1												✓															
The Smooths	1				✓																							
Snapcase	2				✓		✓																					
Snot	1			✓																								
So Abused	1											✓																
The Softer Side	2									✓	✓																	
So Long Arletta	1																											
So Much Hope, Buried.	1																										✓	
Sophie Powers	1																										✓	
So They Say	2												✓	✓														
Social Distortion	1			✓																								
Soda	1		✓																									
Someday Never	2											✓	✓															
Something Corporate	3								✓	✓		✓																
Somerset	1								✓																			
Sonic Boom Six	1																							✓				
The Sounds	2										✓		✓															
Speak Low If You Speak Love	1																					✓						
The Specials	1				✓																							
Speed Of Light	1																										✓	
The Spill Canvas	1													✓														
The Spitvalves	1							✓																				
Splitbreed	1																					✓						
Spray Allen	1																										✓	
Spring Heeled Jack	1					✓																						
Sprout	1							✓																				
Sprung Monkey	1				✓																							
Stacked Like Pancakes	4																					✓		✓	✓	✓		
Staind	1				✓																							
The Starting Line	6								✓	✓		✓		✓												✓	✓	
State Champs	5																			✓	✓		✓		✓		✓	
Staylefish	2														✓	✓												
Stepdad	1																		✓									
Stephan Jacobs	1																			✓								
Stephen Jerzak	1																	✓										
Stick to Your Guns	3														✓					✓				✓				
Still Remains	1													✓														
The Stingrays	1						✓																					
Story of the Year	8								✓	✓	✓	✓			✓					✓					✓		✓	
The Story So Far	4																			✓	✓		✓			✓		
Story Untold	1																								✓			
Strangers You Know	2																				✓	✓						
Stratejacket	1																										✓	
Strawberry Blondes	1																			✓								
Stray from the Path	2																				✓						✓	
Straylight Run	1													✓														
Street Dogs	3														✓			✓						✓				
Street Drum Corps	3													✓	✓											✓		
Streetlight Manifesto	5															✓	✓		✓					✓			✓	
Stretch Armstrong	1										✓																	
Strike Anywhere	1											✓																
Strung Out	6		✓	✓	✓						✓	✓												✓				
S.T.U.N.	1									✓																		
Stutterfly	1											✓																
Sublime	2	✓																									✓	
Suburban Delinquents	1			✓																								
Suburban Legends	1											✓																
Sueco	1																										✓	
Sugarcult	2							✓			✓																	
Sugar Ray	1			✓																								
Suicidal Tendencies	1					✓																						
The Suicide Machines	7		✓	✓			✓			✓		✓												✓			✓	
Suicide Silence	1																✓											
The Suit	1																	✓										
Sum 41	10						✓	✓		✓				✓		✓	✓	✓					✓		✓	✓		
The Summer Set	4																✓			✓	✓		✓					
Summer Wars	1																								✓			
Sumo Cyco	1																					✓						
Sunami	1																										✓	
Sunchild	2			✓	✓																							
Sunflower	1		✓																									
The Sunstreak	1												✓															
Supe	1														✓													
Super Water Sympathy	2																		✓	✓								
Supernova	3	✓	✓											✓														
Surfer Girl	1																										✓	
Survive This!	1																				✓							
Svetlanas	1																					✓						
Sweet Pill	1																										✓	
Taylor Acorn	1																										✓	
Ten56.	1																										✓	
Terror Reid	1																										✓	
The Swellers	1																			✓								
Swingin' Utters	2	✓			✓																							
Switched	2							✓	✓																			
Sworn In	1																							✓				
Sydney	1												✓															
Sykes	1																						✓					
Sylar	1																							✓				
Symposium	1				✓																							
T. Mills	1																		✓									
Taking Back Sunday	5									✓	✓								✓						✓	✓		
Talib Kweli	1												✓															
TAT	4												✓		✓	✓						✓						
Tatiana DeMaria	2																								✓	✓		
Taylor Thrash	1																		✓									
Teenage Bottlerocket	3																				✓		✓			✓		
Ten Second Epic	1																		✓									
Terrible Things	1																	✓										
Terror	1																				✓							
Tess Dunn	7															✓	✓	✓	✓	✓	✓	✓						
Texas in July	1																			✓								
That's Not My Baby	1																				✓							
There For Tomorrow	1																	✓										
They All Float	1																		✓									
Thirty Seconds to Mars	1													✓														
This Wild Life	3																				✓	✓			✓			
Thrice	6							✓	✓	✓		✓			✓											✓		
Throwdown	1													✓														
Throw The Goat	1																								✓			
Through Caydence	1													✓														
Thumb	1				✓																							
Thursday	4								✓		✓		✓														✓	
Tidewater	1																			✓								
Tiger Army	3								✓		✓			✓														
Tillie	1																							✓				
Tilt	3	✓	✓		✓																							
Tip the Van	3											✓	✓				✓											
Title Fight	2													✓					✓									
To The Wind	1																				✓							
Tomorrow's Bad Seeds	2																	✓	✓									
Tonight Alive	4																		✓	✓			✓		✓			
Tony D'Angelo	1																		✓									
Too Close to Touch	2																						✓	✓				
Tornado Rider	1																	✓										
Total Chaos	1													✓														
The Tower and the Fool	1																			✓								
Trading Bryson	1			✓																								
Traitors	1																										✓	
Transit	2																		✓			✓						
Transplants	1											✓																
Trash Boat	1																								✓			
Trashing Andi	1									✓																		
Travie McCoy	1																									✓		
Travis Alexander	1																			✓								
Treaty Oak Revival	1																										✓	
Treaty of Paris	1														✓													
Treephort	1									✓																		
Trip 66	1		✓																									
Trophy Eyes	3																					✓		✓		✓		
Tropidelic	1																								✓			
Trust Company	1								✓																			
T.S.O.L.	3						✓								✓									✓				
Tsunami Bomb	5								✓	✓		✓											✓			✓		
Turnstile	1																								✓			
Trvis	1																										✓	
Twilight Creeps	1																							✓				
Twin Atlantic	1																		✓									
Twistin' Tarantulas	1			✓																								
Twiztid	3									✓															✓	✓		
Tx2	1																										✓	
Tyler Matl	1																			✓								
Underoath	7									✓	✓	✓	✓	✓	✓										✓			
Unearth	1																								✓			
Unleaded	1				✓																							
Unlocking the Truth	1																				✓							
Unsane	1				✓																							
The Unseen	3									✓		✓		✓														
Unwritten Law	5		✓		✓	✓												✓							✓			
Upon a Burning Body	1																			✓								
Urethane	1																										✓	
The Urge	1				✓																							
Urinal Mints	1											✓																
The Used	8								✓	✓	✓			✓					✓	✓					✓	✓		
Valencia	3													✓	✓											✓		
Valient Thorr	4										✓	✓	✓											✓				
Vampires Everywhere!	1																		✓									
The Vandals	10			✓	✓	✓		✓			✓			✓	✓								✓			✓	✓	
The Vanished	1											✓																
Vanna	4														✓				✓		✓		✓					
Varials	2																								✓	✓		
Vaux	2									✓	✓																	
Veara	1																	✓										
Veil Of Maya	1																						✓					
Vended	1																										✓	
Vendetta Red	3								✓	✓									✓									
VersaEmerge	3															✓	✓			✓								
Victory Within	2										✓		✓															
Versus The Ocean	2										✓	✓			✓													
Vigil of War	1																									✓		
The Vincent Black Shadow	2												✓	✓														
Vinnie Caruana	2																		✓	✓								
Vision of Disorder	2			✓		✓																						
Vitamin L	1		✓																									
Volumes	3																			✓	✓		✓					
Vonnegutt	1																	✓										
VooDoo Blue	1											✓																
Voodoo Glow Skulls	1				✓																							
Wage War	4																						✓	✓	✓	✓		
Waka Flocka Flame	2																					✓	✓					
Wallpaper.	1																			✓								
Wank	1				✓																							
War on Women	1																							✓				
Waterparks	4																			✓		✓	✓		✓			
Watsky	2																				✓			✓				
The Waves	2																							✓			✓	
Wax	1																				✓							
We Are the In Crowd	3																✓		✓		✓							
We Are the Ocean	1																		✓									
We Are the Union	1															✓												
We Came as Romans	3																	✓		✓		✓						
We the Kings	9														✓	✓	✓		✓		✓		✓		✓	✓	✓	
weatherPROOF	1													✓														
Weerd Science	1																	✓										
Weezer	1						✓																					
We're Doomed	1																	✓										
West Beverly	1								✓																			
Western Waste	1									✓																		
While She Sleeps	2																			✓		✓						
Whiskers of Jess	1								✓																			
Whitechapel	2																✓						✓					
White Kaps	1			✓																								
The White Noise	1																							✓				
The White Tie Affair	1															✓												
Whitney Peyton	1																									✓		
Wick-It The Instigator	1																		✓									
William Beckett	1																			✓								
William Control	1																							✓				
William Ryan Key	1																								✓			
Wind In Sails	1																				✓							
Winds of Plague	1																	✓										
Windsor Drive	1																	✓										
Winona Fighter	1																										✓	
With Confidence	2																						✓		✓			
Without Self	1									✓																		
Wizo	1	✓																										
Woe, Is Me	2																	✓		✓								
The Wonder Years	4																	✓		✓		✓					✓	
The Word Alive	5																✓	✓			✓		✓				✓	
The World Over	1																									✓		
World’S First Cinema	1																										✓	
X Members	1		✓																									
Yelawolf	1																	✓										
Yellowcard	8								✓	✓	✓			✓					✓		✓		✓				✓	
You Me at Six	3															✓	✓		✓									
You, Me, and Everyone We Know	2													✓	✓													
Young Guns	1																						✓					
Young London	2																		✓	✓								
Young Statues	1																				✓							
The Youth Ahead	1							✓																				
Youth In Revolt	1																					✓						
You Win Anyways	5										✓	✓	✓	✓	✓													
Yungblud	2																								✓	✓		
Yung Gravy	1																										✓	
Zao	1											✓																
Zebrahead	2					✓							✓															
Zero 9:36	1																										✓	
The Ziggens	1				✓																							
Zooloft	1							✓																				
Zulu	1																										✓	

== Sources ==
- Alfonso, Barry (October 2002). The Billboard Guide to Contemporary Christian Music. New York: Billboard Books. ISBN 9780823077182.
- Keiper, Nicole (Jul 2000). "On the Verge". CMJ New Music Report (83). CMJ Network, Inc. ISSN 1074-6978.
- Pearlman, Mischa (September 2015). Bird, Ryan (ed.). "Dismantling Svmmer". Rock Sound (204). London: Freeway Press Inc. ISSN 1465-0185.
