= Spivey =

Spivey may refer to:

== People ==
- Ashlei Spivey (born 1986), American politician from Nebraska
- Bill Spivey (1929–1995), American basketball player
- Cayley Spivey (born 1998), American singer-songwriter
- Dan Spivey (born 1952), American professional wrestler
- Dorin Spivey, American boxer
- Emily Spivey (born 1971), American television writer and producer
- Jaquel Spivey (born 1998), American actor
- Jim Spivey (born 1960), American middle distance runner and Olympian
- Junior Spivey (born 1975), American professional baseball player
- Michael Spivey (born 1960), British computer scientist
- Mike Spivey (American football) (born 1954), American football player
- Mike Spivey (law school administration) (born 1972), American legal academic
- Nigel Spivey (born 1958), British professor of classical art and archaeology
- Phil Spivey (born 1961), Australian hammer thrower
- Victoria Spivey (1906–1976), American blues singer

== Places ==
- Mount Spivey, Alexander Island, Antarctica
- Spivey, Kansas, United States, a city
- Spivey Hall, on the campus of Clayton State University, Morrow, Georgia
- Spivey's Corner, North Carolina, home of the National Hollerin' Contest, a hog calling contest

== Other uses ==
- Spivey Records, a specialist blues record label
