= Beebs and Her Money Makers =

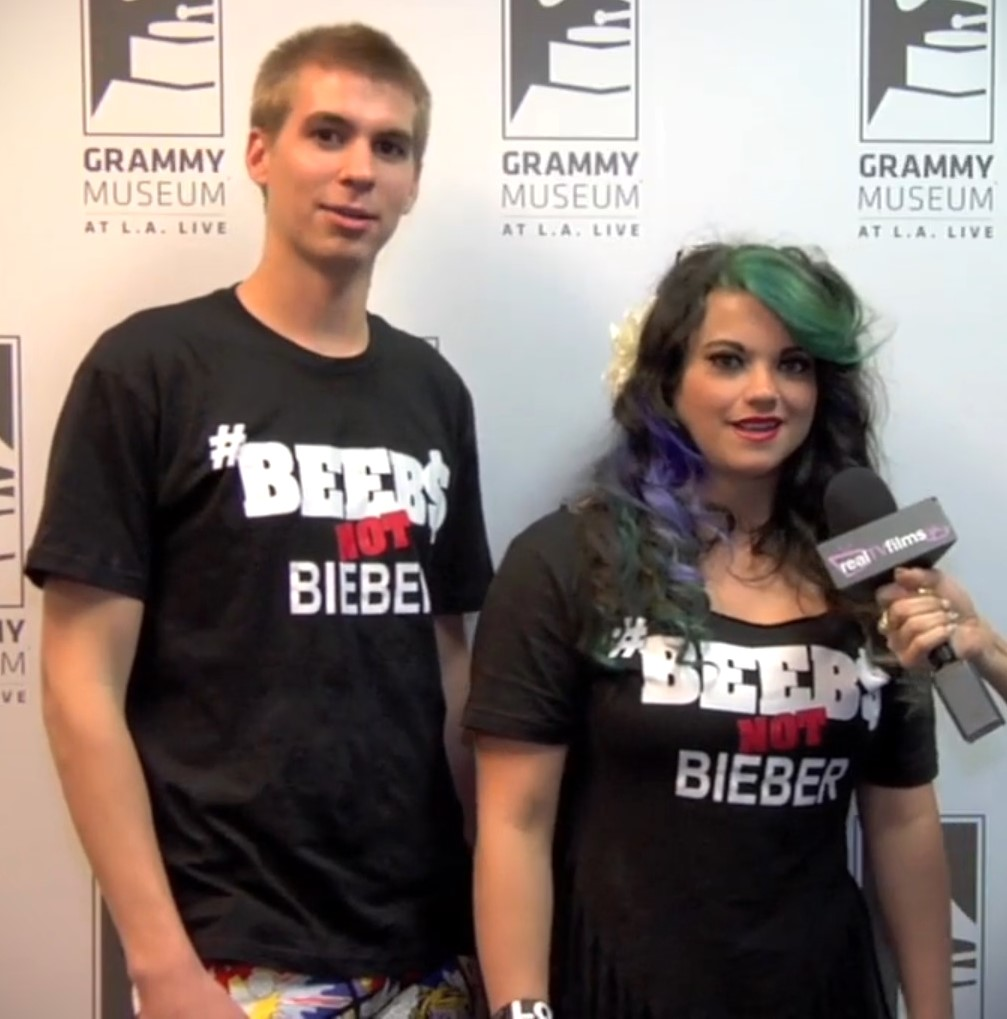
- Beebs (right) and one Money Maker (Paul Brisske, left) in 2014

Background information
- Origin: Orlando, Florida, U.S.
- Years active: 2010 –present
- Members: Beebs; Jeremy Lovelady; Levon White; Bruno Ufret; Bunky Garrabrant
- Past members: Dave Wade; Btrue; Jeff Carruth; Paul Brisske; Alex Petrosky; Eric'E-Money' Christian

Beebs and Her Money Makers (BaHMM) is an American post-third wave ska band from Orlando, Florida, fronted by Michelle Beebs. The group first achieved national exposure while on the Vans Warped Tour 2013 alongside Reel Big Fish with whom they toured in November. The band is also featured on the second season of reality show Warped Roadies on Fuse (TV channel). They have released three full-length albums -- "Welcome to Barter Town" (2010), "No Sleep Tonight!" (2013) and "Wurst Album Ever" (2014) -- as well as an EP, "How to Start a Dance Party" (2013). They are known for their upbeat music, high-energy stage presence, and goofy video content.

== History ==
=== Early Years (2010-2012) ===
The group was formed in 2010 by Beebs and Jeremy Lovelady in Melbourne, Florida, who subsequently moved to Orlando after having musician troubles and met drummer Jeff Carruth and emcee Btrue. There, the group wrote, arranged and recorded their first album, "Welcome to Barter Town" which was produced by Michelle Beebs and drummer Jeff Carruth, and engineered by Brandon Kaufman. The CD release party was at the House of Blues in Orlando, Florida.

After performing at the 2012 Florida Music Festival, Beebs was approached by Warped Tour founder/producer Kevin Lyman who invited the group to perform at all 40 dates of the 2013 Vans Warped Tour.

=== Second Album and Warped Tour (2013) ===
The band recorded their second album, "No Sleep Tonight!" in 2013 at Studio 18 in Orlando. Following this, they acquired a sponsorship from Ripley's Believe It or Not! to assist in financing the tour. While on tour, the group were filmed for a featuring role in Warped Roadies Season 2 on Fuse (TV channel). BaHMM also began releasing their own video content which has featured Reel Big Fish, Goldfinger, The Aquabats, and Jackson Rathbone. After tour, the band was invited Pot O' Gold recording studio in Anaheim, California where they recorded the EP "How to Start a Dance Party", including the single "Crazy" which featured Reel Big Fish frontman Aaron Barrett. The EP was also produced by Barrett and engineered by studio owner David Irish.

The band then went on tour as direct support for Reel Big Fish, Goldfinger and Five Iron Frenzy for the north east leg of their fall tour in 2013. In the summer of 2014 they plan to joining the Vans Warped Tour presented by Journeys. The band has earned a positive reception from the Orlando Sentinel, who stated "songs such as "Hand Out" and "Miss Captain Kangaroo" mixed rock, old-school R&B and other influences with air-tight precision. It's a well-conceived package that is hard to resist."

== Current Band Members ==
- Michelle Beebs - vocals and kazoo
- Jeremy Lovelady - guitar
- Levon White - bass
- Bunky Garrabrant - trumpet

== Former Band Members ==
- Dave Wade - bass
- Btrue - emcee
- Jeff Carruth - drums/production
- Paul Brisske - drums
- Alex Petrosky - drums
- Eric 'E-Money' Christian - saxophone and flute
- Bruno Ufret - drums

== Discography ==
=== Albums ===
- Welcome to Barter Town (2011)
- No Sleep Tonight! (2013)
- Würst Album Ever (2014)

=== EPs ===
- How to Start a Dance Party (2013)
  - Produced by Aaron Barrett

=== Music Videos ===
- Waterfalls cover (2014)
- Out the Door (2014)
- Wrecking Ball cover (2013)
- Jumpin' (2013)
- Miss Captain Kangaroo (2012)
- Hand Out (2011)

=== Singles ===
- Crazy (feat Aaron Barrett)
- Wrecking Ball cover
- Out the Door
