= Warped Tour 1998 =

1998 concert tour

- Tour by Warped Tour
- Warped Tour 1998 logo
- Location: North America
- Start date: June 30, 1998
- End date: August 9, 1998
- No. of shows: 34

Warped Tour concert chronology
- Warped Tour 1997; Warped Tour 1998; Warped Tour 1999

Warped Tour 1998 was the 4th edition of the Vans Warped Tour. The 34-date North American tour began on in Phoenix, Arizona, and ended August 9, 1998 in Austin, Texas. Four concerts were held in Canada, with the rest in United States locations. After the North American tour ended, Warped Tour traveled overseas for the first time, with a modified lineup appearing in Europe, Australia and Japan. The previous edition had a European leg.

The tour featured four stages – two main and two side – and included a "World Warped Stage" sponsored by ASCAP/ Ernie Ball that showcased local bands. The band lineups and running orders on the stages differed between dates. The tour headliners included Bad Religion, Cherry Poppin' Daddies, Deftones, NOFX, Rancid, Reverend Horton Heat, and The Specials. A 2011 Warped Tour retrospective article in the Dallas Observer deemed the 1998 lineup one of the four best ever Warped Tour lineups in its 17-year history up to that point. Other attractions featured on the tour included skateboarding demonstrations by pros such as Steve Caballero, Neal Hendrix, Andy Macdonald, Mike Frazier, and Jen O'Brien. A tour documentary, Punk Rock Summer Camp, was released on VHS in 1999 and on DVD in 2003.

The July 18 concert in Somerset, Wisconsin at Float Rite Park was merged with the heavy metal festival Ozzfest for the first and only time, resulting in a 12-hour, six-stage, 48-band event called "Ozz Gets Warped" with attendance first reported as 60,000 and later as 39,000.

== Bands ==
- 22 Jacks
- 311
- All
- Amazing Royal Crowns
- Anthrophobia
- The Aquabats
- Atomic Fireballs
- Bad Religion
- Blink 182
- Bouncing Souls
- Cherry Poppin' Daddies
- CIV
- Deftones
- Dropkick Murphys
- Flashlight
- Fu Manchu
- Full on the Mouth
- The Get Up Kids
- Godsmack
- Hatebreed
- Hepcat
- Home Grown
- Hi-Standard
- H_{2}O
- Incubus
- Kid Rock
- Latex Generation
- L.E.S. Stitches
- Mad Caddies
- MxPx
- NOFX
- No Use For A Name
- Pietasters
- Rancid
- Reverend Horton Heat
- Royal Crown Revue
- Save Ferris
- Skavoovie and the Epitones
- The Slackers
- The Smooths
- Snapcase
- The Specials
- Staind
- Strung Out
- Symposium
- Swingin' Utters
- Tilt
- The Urge
- Unsane
- Unwritten Law
- U.S. Bombs
- Voodoo Glowskulls
- The Vandals
- Zebrahead

== Tour dates ==
Date	City	Country	Venue
Asia-Pacific
January 9, 1998	Auckland	New Zealand	Rosebank Domain
January 11, 1998	Gold Coast	Australia	Doug Jennings Park
January 14, 1998	Byron Bay	Australia	Rugby League Club
January 15, 1998	Coffs Harbour	Australia	Coffs Harbour Showground
January 17, 1998	Sydney	Australia	Keirle Park
January 18, 1998	Ulladulla	Australia	Milton Showgrounds
January 20, 1998	Newcastle	Australia	No. 2 Sportsground
January 23, 1998	Adelaide	Australia	Gawler Racecource
January 24, 1998	Melbourne	Australia	Royal Melbourne Showgrounds
January 25, 1998	Geelong	Australia	Geelong Showgrounds
January 28, 1998	Kawasaki	Japan	Club Citta
January 29, 1998	Osaka	Japan	Bayside Jenny
January 31, 1998	Honolulu	United States	Waimanalo Polo Field
North America
June 30, 1998	Phoenix	United States	Celebrity Theatre
July 1, 1998	Del Mar	United States	Del Mar Fairgrounds
July 2, 1998	Irvine	United States	Irvine Meadows
July 4, 1998	Lake Tahoe	United States	Boreal Ski Area
July 5, 1998	San Francisco	United States	Pier 30/32
July 7, 1998	Seattle	United States	Kingdome Lot
July 8, 1998	Vancouver	Canada	PNE Coliseum
July 9, 1998	Estacada	United States	Timberbowl
July 10, 1998	Nampa	United States	Idaho Center
July 11, 1998	Salt Lake City	United States	Utah State Fairgrounds
July 12, 1998	Boulder	United States	Franklin Field
July 14, 1998	Tulsa	United States	Mohawk Park
July 15, 1998	Fenton	United States	Buder Park
July 16, 1998	Chicago	United States	United Center Parking Lot
July 17, 1998	Milwaukee	United States	Brewers Stadium Parking Lot
July 18, 1998	Somerset	United States	Float Rite Park Amphitheatre
July 19, 1998	Lawrence	United States	Burcham Park
July 21, 1998	Pittsburgh	United States	IC Light Amphitheatre
July 22, 1998	Pontiac	United States	Phoenix Center
July 23, 1998	Cleveland	United States	Nautica Stage
July 24, 1998	Toronto	Canada	Toronto on the Docks
July 25, 1998	Montreal	Canada	Parc Jean Drapeau
July 26, 1998	Québec City	Canada	Expo Cité
July 28, 1998	Buffalo	United States	La Salle Park
July 29, 1998	Northampton	United States	Three County Fairgrounds
July 30, 1998	Philadelphia	United States	Core States Spectrum
July 31, 1998	Washington, D.C.	United States	RFK Stadium
August 1, 1998	New York	United States	Randall's Island
August 2, 1998	Asbury Park	United States	Stone Pony
August 4, 1998	Jacksonville	United States	Jacksonville State Fairgrounds
August 5, 1998	Pompano Beach	United States	Pompano Beach Amphitheatre
August 6, 1998	Orlando	United States	Central FL Fairgrounds
August 8, 1998	Houston	United States	Astro Arena
August 9, 1998	Austin	United States	South Park Meadows
Europe
August 28, 1998	Reading	England	Reading Festival
August 29, 1998	Hasselt	Belgium	Pukkelpop
August 30, 1998	Dronten	Netherlands	Lowlands Festival
September 2, 1998	Hamburg	Germany	Wilhelm Koch Stadium
September 4, 1998	Minden	Germany	Weserufer
September 5, 1998	Strasbourg	France	Festival des Artefacts
September 6, 1998	Hünxe	Germany	Schwarze Heide Airfield
September 7, 1998	Cologne	Germany	Media Park
September 9, 1998	Berlin	Germany	Parkbühne Wuhlheide
September 10, 1998	Vienna	Austria	Libro Music Hall
September 11, 1998	Budapest	Hungary	Euro Park
September 12, 1998	Ljubljana	Slovenia	Krizanke
September 13, 1998	Inzell	Germany	Ice Stadium
September 15, 1998	Bologna	Italy	Festa de l'Unità
September 16, 1998	Milan	Italy	Palavobis
September 18, 1998	Barcelona	Spain	Badalona Olympic Pavilion
September 19, 1998	Madrid	Spain	Leganes Bullring
September 20, 1998	Pamplona	Spain	Bullring
