= Black Square (band) =

- Origin: Honolulu, Hawaii, United States
- Genres: Ska, punk, reggae
- Years active: 2002–present
- Members: Josh86; Brian Kim; Demetri Marmash; T.R. Jared; Kat Bumbaclot; Ken Lykes; Evan "Babyface" Lewis; Chad "Chiga" Higa
- Past members: Nick Danger; Mike Hergenraider; Johnny Boto; Mike Bone; Geoff "G-Bone" Siffring; Bianca Vax; Taylor Rice; Jon Savage
- Website: http://www.blacksquareband.com/

Black Square is an American ska band from Honolulu, Hawaii, United States. Originally formed in 2002 as a hardcore punk trio, Black Square expanded into a 9-piece in 2023 and currently consists of Josh86 (vocals, guitar), Brian Kim (drums), Kat Bumbaclot (guitar and backing vocals), Demetri Marmash (bass), Jared (trombone, backing vocals), T.R. (alto saxophone, backing vocals), Chiga (trumpet), Ken Lykes (keyboard) and Babyface (tenor saxophone, backing vocals) and. Since expanding to a nine-piece set up Black Square has sought to blend ska, punk, rocksteady, reggae, and hip-hop influences to create a distinct ska sound that maintains the intensity and style of punk rock. The band's name is a reference to Kazimir Malevich's 1915 oil painting of a black square on a plain piece of canvas.

Black Square is one of Hawaii's few touring ska bands and has completed over 12 U.S. mainland tours and 1 tour of Japan. Along with these tours Black Square has also become a local favorite around their hometown of Honolulu. Although primarily from the island of Oahu the band often travels to Hawaii's outer islands such as Maui and the Big Island to perform. Black Square has enjoyed national success and performed on the Vans Warped Tour 2011.

Black Square has released five albums and has been featured on several compilations. Their music has also been featured on Fuel TV, Billabong Surf, Heavy Water, Wahine Blue, Board Stories, the feature film One Kine Day (2011), and the Hawaii International Film Festival award-winning documentary Noho Hewa (2008).

== Discography ==
=== Studio albums ===
- End the Cycle (2004)
- One Glass of Water (2007)
- Onward (2008)
- Black Square (2011)
- To the Hills (2018)

=== Compilation albums ===
- Hawaiian Punk: Volume 2 (Hawaiian Express Records)
- Send Ska! Hawaii's Best Of 2004 (Gardenia Lane)
