= Middle Finger Salute =

English punk rock band

- Origin: Blackburn, Lancashire, England
- Genres: Punk rock, pop punk, alternative rock
- Years active: 2005–present
- Labels: Circuit Scene Records (UK), Drumming Monkey Records (EU)
- Members: Cal Sutton; Danny Wareing; Ryan McDermott; Miles Starkie
- Past members: Jonny Marriner
- Website: www.middlefingersalute.co.uk

Middle Finger Salute are an English punk rock band from Blackburn, Lancashire, England.

== History ==
Middle Finger Salute began in 2005 by four friends aged 13 and 15 playing in a punk band. The band managed to get onto the festival scene performing Rebellion Festivals and Wasted Punk Festivals, in the UK and Europe, self-releasing EP's such as Guts for Glory and What We Live For.

== Tours and recordings ==
In 2012, after releasing three self-financed EPs and several compilation inclusions (including two separate Vans Warped compilations released by Side One Dummy), Middle Finger Salute took a step back from their touring schedule to hit the studio. Their debut album Old Friends, New Bruises was released on 12 November 2012 on Circuit Scene Records.

The last few years has seen the band tour the US on the Vans Warped Tour three times (2009, 2010 and 2013), play SXSW, headline their own show in Los Angeles and tour the UK and Europe countless times, including shows at Liverpool Sound City, Rebellion Festival, In The City Festival, Wickerman Festival, and playing shows with artists such as Make Do and Mend, Against Me!, The Riverboat Gamblers, Rancid, Set Your Goals, Cancer Bats and The Blackout (amongst many others) in the process.

The band performed at Vans Warped Tour UK, the first UK Warped Tour in 13 years, at Alexandra Palace.

In summer 2013, the band performed on the entire Vans Warped Tour in the US.

== Albums ==
=== We Are The Sleepless (2010) ===
In June 2010, their EP We Are The Sleepless was self-released to coincide with their stint on the Vans Warped Tour 2010. The EP featured guest vocals from Anti-Flag's Justin Sane and Cock Sparrer's Colin McFaull, whom the band had met on previous tours. The EP was received well and the band sold out their pressing of the EP. To date, the EP has never been re-pressed.

In January 2011, the band regrettably announced that long time friend and original bass player Jonny Marriner had left the band to focus on work commitments. Later that month it was announced that Chris Brownless would be taking the position on bass.

=== Old Friends, New Bruises (2012) ===
In October 2011, Middle Finger Salute announced they had begun recording their first album to be released on Circuit Scene Records. Old Friends, New Bruises was released on 12 November 2012, with pre-sale at Vans Warped Tour UK on 10 November. "We Made It" was made available for free download running up to the release on the band's social media.

=== Disposable Noise (2013) ===
In January 2013, it was announced that the band would be performing on the full Vans Warped Tour 2013. The band then released Disposable Noise EP as a fresh release for the two-month tour. Disposable Noise EP was released on 12 June digitally, but physical copies were only sold for the duration of the Vans Warped Tour.

== Band members ==
- Calum Sutton
- Danny Wareing
- Ryan McDermott
- Miles Starkie

== Discography ==
=== Albums ===
Year	Album	Label
2006	Middle Finger Salute	Self-released
2008	Guts For Glory (EP)	Self-released
2009	What We Live For	Self-released
2009	Vans Warped Tour '09 Official Compilation	SideOneDummy Records
2010	We Are The Sleepless	Self-released
2010	Vans Warped Tour '10 Official Compilation	SideOneDummy Records
2012	Old Friends, New Bruises	Circuit Scene Records (UK), Drumming Monkey Records (EU)
2013	Vans Warped Tour '13 Official Compilation	SideOneDummy Records
2013	Disposable Noise EP	Knuckles Up Records
