= Eternal Boy =

American pop punk band

- Also known as: The SpacePimps
- Origin: Pittsburgh, Pennsylvania, U.S.
- Genre: Pop punk
- Years active: 2007–present
- Labels: Four Chord Music, Kick Rock Music
- Members: Rishi Bahl, Jon Ewing, Joshua Bombay
- Website: www.eternalboymusic.com

Eternal Boy is an American pop punk band from Pittsburgh, Pennsylvania, which had been called The SpacePimps prior to 2017. The group have released four full-length albums and have an extensive touring history that includes years on the Vans Warped Tour, as well as touring in China, Japan, USA, Canada and Europe. The debut Eternal Boy album, Awkward Phase, charted on five of the Billboard charts in 2017 (the Billboard 200, Heatseekers, Top Independent Albums, Top Rock Albums, and Top Vinyl Albums charts). In April 2021, Eternal Boy released their 2nd overall album, Bad Days Are Over, which charted for 4 weeks in Billboard top 100 New Albums. Additionally, Bad Days Are Over, was on the nomination ballot for 3 Grammy's in 2021: Best Alternative Album, Best Rock Album and Best Rock Performance. The band released their most recent album, "Little Room to Breathe," in July 2024. The record was put on the Grammy nomination ballot for the 2nd album in a row, this time landing noms for Best Rock Performance and best Rock Album.

== Career ==
=== Early years ===
The band met while in high school, where they began covering songs of other pop-punk artists. After winning a battle of the bands in Pittsburgh, they began playing more extensively in the region, which eventually led to touring all across the United States. Bahl attended a strict private high school in Pittsburgh where he started the band. The band draws their influence from the early 2000's pop punk glory days.

Throughout the early years, the band worked through the ups and downs of earning their education while building up the band. Bahl holds an undergraduate and master's degree from the University of Pittsburgh, and completed his Ph.D. from Duquesne University. Bahl has published papers and presented in the field of Marketing, Analytics, and Entertainment Marketing.

=== Turn it Up and Stuck Here Forever (2010) ===
In 2007 the band recorded with Dave Bjornson (The Darkness) and released their first formal full-length album titled, Turn It Up! After touring on the album, they began to gain traction, and caught the attention of Japanese record label Kick Rock Music. In September 2007, the label released the record, and the band toured for the first time in Japan to sold out crowds. The popularity of the record caught the attention of the Warped Tour, where they played in 2007, 2008, and 2009, and 2014. After touring extensively on Turn It Up! the band entered the studio to record their second full length Stuck Here Forever with producer Chris Badami (The Starting Line, The Early November). In 2010, the band released the album, where it reached #7 on the Smartpunk.com charts, as well as charted in the top 100 on the iTunes rock and alternative charts. The album was reviewed positively by absolutepunk.net as well as Alternative Press, and was released again in Japan as well as China. The band was featured in Newsweek magazine, documenting the balance between being a full-time band and attending college. One of the singles, "The Guide to Ruining Your Life", won the Independent Music Award for Best Punk Song of the year in 2011. The band performed at the Midi Music Festival throughout China. They also performed in Japan at the Shibuya Crash Music Festival alongside Mad Caddies, Useless ID, Title Fight, and H_{2}O.

=== Eternal Boy (2013) ===
In July 2013, the band released Eternal Boy, their third studio album produced by Chris Badami. The album opened in the top 40 on the iTunes charts as well as the 20 in the iTunes Alternative charts. The band toured to support the album in the US, Japan, China, and Canada. To correspond with the release, they released a music video for the single "Party Foul", as well as a second for the single "Katie". The band performed on the Vans Warped Tour 2014, and also returned to China and Japan to promote the release. In 2016 the band decided to change their name to Eternal Boy, due to the success of the album and intent to grow.

=== Awkward Phase (2017) ===
The band's first album as Eternal Boy was released on July 14, 2017, via Four Chord Music. It was produced by Chris Badami and includes 12 tracks. The album charted on five of the Billboard charts—the Billboard 200, Rock Albums, Independent Albums, Heatseekers, and Vinyl Albums charts. The band toured to support the album in the US, United Kingdom, Europe, and also released their first music video for the single "Hung Up On Hope" on the day the album was released. Awkward Phase was well received by the public and media outlets. The band subsequently released music videos for "Awkward Phase", "Demons", and "Harder to Stay". The band gained attention for having a classic pop punk sound during the genres pinnacle in the early 2000's. On August 28, 2020, the band performed the album in its entirety to celebrate the three-year anniversary of its release.

=== Bad Days Are Over (2021) ===
The band's album Bad Days Are Over was released on April 30, 2021, via Four Chord Music. Returning for production was Chris Badami with nine tracks. The original recording took place near New York City and just prior to COVID-19 closures. The album was then mastered by Ted Jensen during the pandemic so the band was unable to be in the studio during the mastering. The album received rave reviews, having charted on the Billboard Top 100 Albums for the first 4 weeks of its release as well as landing 3 Grammy considerations. Online record reviewing site TunedUp said Bad Days Are Over has "ripping riffs and infectious lyricism" that brings listers "unbridled joy."

=== Little Room to Breathe (2024) ===
In July 2024, the band released their 3rd album, "Little Room to Breathe." The record was positively received by the public, and the release corresponded with a US tour with the legendary Bowling For Soup. The record was produced by Chris Badami and mastered by Ted Jensen. The album landed on 2 of the nomination ballots for the Grammys for Best Rock Performance and Best Rock Album.

== Other music ==
The band contributed a cover of "What's My Age Again?" to A Tribute to Blink 182: Pacific Ridge Records Heroes of Pop-Punk, appearing on the album alongside bands like All Time Low and Four Year Strong. Additionally, they recorded a song for the Alkaline Trio tribute record, "Jaked on Green Beers" alongside Punchline, The Wonder Years, and other bands in the genre. Both tributes were released on Pacific Ridge Records. The band's songs "Running Away" and "2003" were used on The Challenge on MTV. The band's single "Party Foul" was featured on ESPN's Monday Night Football. Eternal Boy's track "Awkward Phase" was featured on NBC's Sunday Night Football in 2019.

Music site AbsolutePunk placed Eternal Boy in their "Absolute 100" in 2017, a list of bands the site feels are on the rise. Bahl is the curator and owner of The Four Chord Music Festival, which features top talent in the genre for a weekend festival in Pittsburgh, PA. Eternal Boy has performed at the festival over the years.

== Discography ==
=== Albums ===
- Turn It Up! (2007)
- Stuck Here Forever (2010)
- Eternal Boy (2013)
- Awkward Phase (2017)
- Bad Days Are Over (2021)
- Little Room to Breathe (2024)

=== Singles ===
- "Promise" featuring Cello Fury (2019)
