= Cold Forty Three =

American pop-punk band

- Origin: Los Angeles, California
- Labels: ReverbNation
- Website: www.coldfortythree.com

Cold Forty Three (Cold 40*3) is an American pop and punk band from Los Angeles, California. The band consists of vocalist and guitarist Moises Cruz, vocalist and bass guitarist Joshua Cruz, and drummer Ricky James Acosta. With original lead guitarist Alex Sayes, the band achieved mild acknowledgement from participating in a local TV station in Los Angeles called fuse.

== Formation (2006–2007) ==
Moises Cruz, Joshua Cruz and Ricky James Acosta grew up together on the same street and in 2006, after each of their previous bands split, they formed their own band. Due to prior engagements, Ricky James Acosta was forced to leave the band in early 2007. Not wanting to leave the band without a drummer, he introduced to the band his friend, and fellow drummer, Rene Haro. Rene Haro appeared during rehearsals and was hired soon after. The band also hired Alex Sayes to play lead guitar.

== Early albums and moderate success (2008) ==
The band recorded various demos and filmed a music video for their single "Cheating B**ch". The publicity eventually allowed the band to play many different Los Angeles venues, including The Whisky a Go Go, The Roxy Theater, The El Rey Theatre, The Troubadour and other various bars and clubs on the Sunset Strip. In early 2008, the band began writing music for their first, full-length EP, which would eventually become From The Garage to Your Speakers. During the writing process, Joshua Cruz contacted Tomas Costanza, producer, vocalist and guitarist for the band Diffuser, to discuss the possibility of working with the band on the record. After reviewing the band's demos, Tomas Costanza agreed to produce the record.

== TV show, record release and line-up changes (2008–2009) ==
While producing Cold Forty Three's first record, the band was approached by television network FUSE, to be featured in a series called Rock Bottom. The show focused on former drummer Rene Haro's habitual marijuana use and the internal band conflicts that it caused. Meanwhile, the band's lead guitarist, Alex Sayes, left the band permanently due to personal issues and an arrest. While filming for the reality television show, the band signed with Chamberlain Records and finished recording their debut record, From the Garage to Your Speakers. The band released the record on October 11, 2008, the same day Fuse aired Rock Bottom, featuring Cold Forty Three. After the episode was debuted, reviews were well received by fans and critics alike.

Through 2009, the remaining members of the band toured the US extensively in support of the new record. Rene Haro's substance abuse continued, which forced the band to ask him to leave in July 2009. Ricky James Acosta was tapped by the band to re-join and they continued on with their tour before calling it quits in 2013
