= To the Wind =

American hardcore punk band

- Origin: Seattle, Washington, United States
- Genres: Hardcore punk Metalcore; Melodic hardcore
- Years active: 2008–2016
- Labels: Pure Noise
- Members: Tanner Murphy; Ryan Murphy; Tron Laur; Cory Lamb; Matt Farage

To the Wind is an American hardcore punk band from Seattle, Washington. Mainly active from 2008 to 2016, they have released 3 EPs, and 3 full-length studio albums on Pure Noise Records.

To the Wind released their first long player record in 2013, the "melodic hardcore" album Empty Eyes. To promote their second studio album, Block Out the Sun & Sleep, To The Wind played over 2 weeks in Vans Warped Tour 2014. Their third studio album, The Brighter View, was released in October 2016. Produced by Andrew Neufelf of Comeback Kid, on Pure Noise Records, the album received a 3.5* review in Metal Hammer which praised its "abrasive dynamism" and ability to dole out "infectious energy, passion and aggression in equal measures".

== Members ==
- Tanner Murphy (vocals)
- Ryan Murphy (guitar)
- Tron Laur (bass, vocals)
- Cory Lamb (drums)
- Matt Farage (guitar)

== Discography ==
=== Singles ===
- “Temporary Escape” (2016)

=== EPs ===
- The Hardest Part (2008)
- Foundations (2010)
- No More Than This (2012)

=== Albums ===
- Empty Eyes (2013)
- Block Out the Sun & Sleep (2014)
- The Brighter View (2016)
