= Latex Generation =

American punk rock band

- Origin: New York, United States
- Genre: Punk rock
- Years active: Early 1990s-2006
- Past members: Paul Fort, Mike Hobbs, Tommy Rockstar

Latex Generation is a punk rock band formed during the early 1990s in New York. The band's name was inspired by a news report on STDs, the AIDS epidemic, and the threat it could pose to the current generation of teens.

Over the years, Latex Generation has released 2 full-length CDs, three 7-inch records, a number of compilation album contributions, and has toured extensively throughout North America, Europe, and Australia, most notably on the Van's Warped Tour.

== Discography ==
- 360°
- Boysrock
