= Cayley Spivey =

American guitarist and singer-songwriter

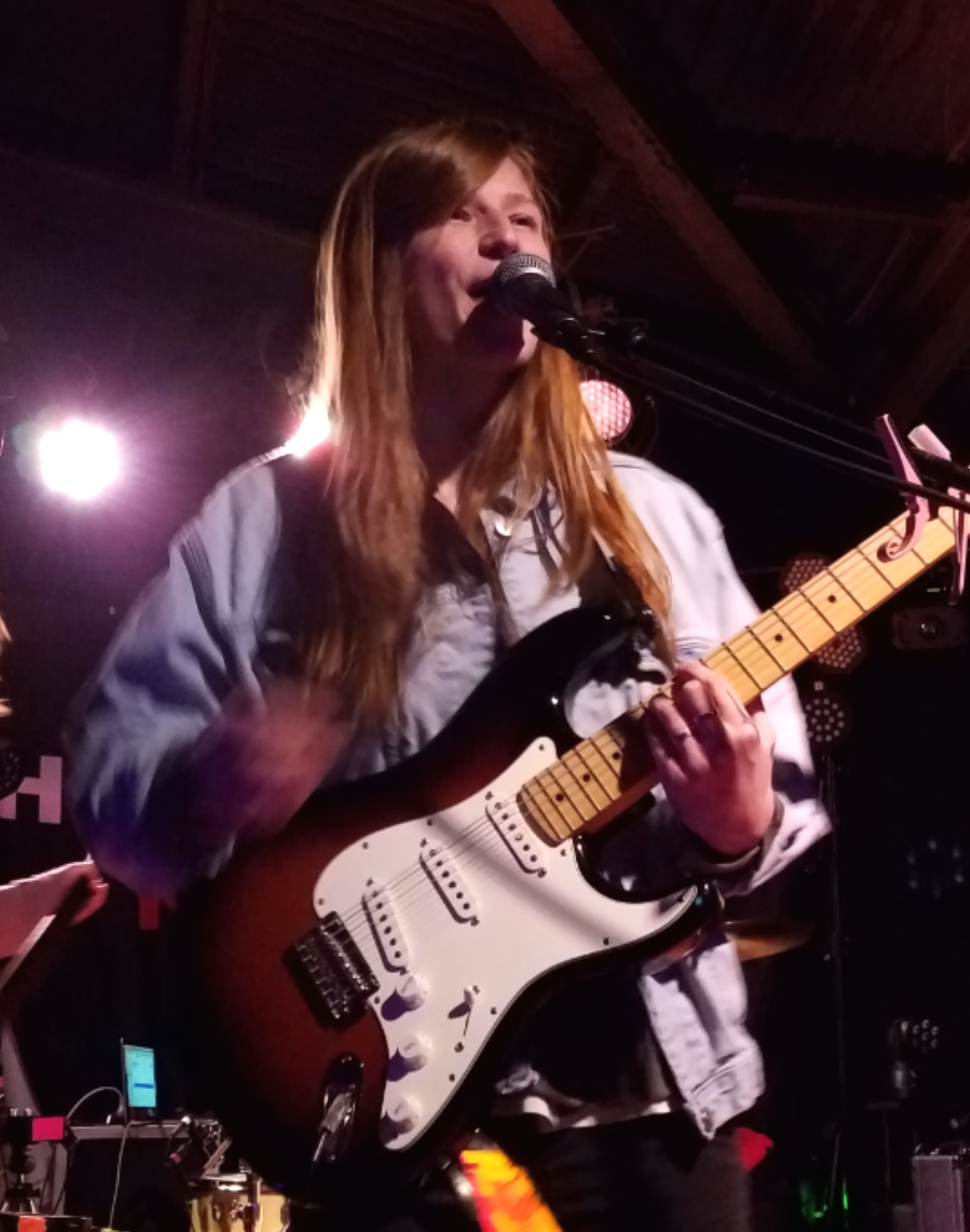
- Cayley Spivey performing as Small Talks at Voltage Lounge in Philadelphia, Pennsylvania, in February 2019.

Background information
- Born: Cayley Marie Spivey
- Origin: Myrtle Beach, South Carolina, U.S.
- Genres: Indie rock, Dream Pop, Pop Punk, Indie pop
- Years active: 2017–present
- Label: Common Grounds Records
- Formerly of: Small Talks
- Website: www.cayleyspivey.com

Cayley Marie Spivey is an American guitarist and singer-songwriter from Myrtle Beach, South Carolina. They (Note: Spivey is nonbinary and uses they/them pronouns, but accepts being referred to by any pronouns. This article uses they/them for consistency.) began their career performing as a solo project known as Small Talks, recording and touring as a three-piece band. Under the Small Talks name, Spivey released the EP Until It Turns to Petals in 2017. The project's first full-length studio album A Conversation Between Us was released on February 1, 2019, via Common Ground Records.

In August 2020, Spivey announced they would be releasing new music full time under their own name and retiring the Small Talks moniker. In conjunction with that announcement, Spivey released "SFU", their first single using their given name.

On March 29, 2024, Spivey released their first digital album of music under their own name, the eight track Her, highlighted by the singles "Backseat Boyfriend" and "ILY.".

== Career ==
Spivey began writing acoustic songs in their bedroom by the age of 15, and soon began booking local shows at coffee shops in their native Myrtle Beach, South Carolina. They originally began their career under the stage name Small Talks. The COVID-19 pandemic restrictions affected their music journey and overall reach, so they turned to content creation to promote their work while the world was physically isolating. As they gained popularity on platforms such as TikTok, the public began to connect Small Talks to Spivey; they decided to embrace their given name and pivot their music branding rather than continue to push Small Talks. They decided they wanted to commit to an Indie Pop brand- in addition to preventing being confused for a full band rather than a solo artist- and wrote SFU, their first pop based single under Cayley Spivey.

=== As Small Talks (2015–2019) ===
Originally formed as a three-piece band on May 31, 2015, to perform their songs live, Spivey created the solo project Small Talks and played a number of club and house shows around Myrtle Beach, developing a strong local following.

In January 2017, the band was signed to California-based label Common Ground Records and released their debut EP Until It Turns To Petals, featuring the singles "New Dork Pity" and "Cop Car". That same year, the band was named co-winners of the "Skullcandy StayLoud Showdown" at the Knitting Factory in Williamsburg, Brooklyn, headlined by Canadian band July Talk, earning themselves ten dates on the 2017 Van's Warped Tour.

The band has toured extensively, opening for a variety of acts including Can't Swim, Broadside, With Confidence, Chaos Chaos, The Regrettes, and Shortly, as well as headlining their own dates and performing at festivals such as Bled Fest in Howell, Michigan, and The Fest in Gainesville, Florida.

=== As Cayley Spivey (2020-present) ===
On August 5, 2020, Spivey announced that they would be releasing music for the first time under their given name, and retiring the Small Talks moniker for good. The move was to lean more into pop music over indie rock, and to increase their chances at success. "Since the project Small Talks has always been me," they explain, "I realized it's not going to help if I'm constantly mistaken for a band."

At midnight Eastern Time on August 14, 2020, Spivey released their first single under their own name, entitled "SFU," meaning "so fucked up."

According to Spivey, the single "is an anthem for being trapped in a less than ideal situation through the lens of a hopeless romantic. I have a habit of romanticizing things that aren't good for me whenever I'm not ready to let it go. This is me sharing my story of being stuck in a loop until I could see clearly enough to remove love's blinders and walk away. Love can make me do crazy things, this song was my way of reflecting on why that is."

On October 26, 2020, Spivey released their second single under their own name, "Not Over You Yet". Their third single, "Cross The Line", was released on March 19, 2021. The singles "Bad For Each Other", "Ordinary" (feat. DazyFace), and "Backseat Boyfriend" were released during the winter of 2021 and 2022. On October 27, 2023, Spivey released the digital album Her on Spotify (and other services), featuring previously released tracks like "Backseat Boyfriend" and "ILY" along with six other tracks.

On June 14, 2024, Spivey and singer/songwriter Lyncs released the duet single "Worst Case Scenario," and later in 2024 Spivey joined Lyncs' touring band playing lead guitar and performing backing vocals on a nationwide tour. Later in 2024, Spivey performed with the band backing Laur Elle.

In 2025, Spivey released three singles- Fade Into The Room, Reciprocal, and Camera Boy- along with another EP titled Camera Boy (Stripped).

Spivey's songwriting has also evolved alongside their music. Earlier lyrics avoided pronouns and were not overtly queer; more recent lyrics explore queerness and same-sex relationships more directly. Spivey has described writing from a more open approach in the studio, moving away from predetermined ideas toward a less structured process.

== Personal life ==
Spivey is non-binary, and uses they/them pronouns, but accepts being referred to by any pronouns. They also identify as pansexual, and refers to their sexuality – as well as their gender – as an integral piece of their sound, stating "a lot of my songs are inspired by relationships that I've had, and that comes from me being LGBTQ."

They have embraced viral social media video app TikTok both as a music artist and as an LGBTQ performer. Spivey has a growing social media presence. In the last few years, TikTok has been their most popular platform. They have 281.7k followers on TikTok, 105k followers on Instagram, 4.2k subscribers on YouTube, and 603 followers on SoundCloud. Their most popular videos are their music videos; on YouTube the three most popular music videos are SFU (48.4k views), Backseat Boyfriend (43.3k views), and Not Over You Yet (41.8k views). Spivey is classified as Pop, Indie Pop, and Pop Rock. They have had 25 live performances from 2018 until November of 2025, but are working to obtain more. All except two were in the United States, the outliers were in Canada.

== Accompanying band ==
Current members

- Cayley Spivey – vocals, guitar
- Emma Oakley – guitar
- Tessa Reid – bass
- Sam Partridge – drums

Past members

- Justin Charette – drums
- Tyler Lankford – bass
- Kenny Kelly – bass
- Blake Byrd – drums
- Doug Smith – bass
- Tom LeBeau – drums

== Discography ==
Cayley Spivey has a decent sized discography beginning in 2017 with their band Small Talks. They have a solo album titled Her, released in 2023. In addition to this album, they have four EPs and twenty singles. Two of the EPs are with Small Talks, and only five of the singles are associated with the band. Spivey has 27,833 monthly listeners on the Spotify platform and is verified by the company as well. They are most listened to in London, Great Britain and Chicago, USA with 536 listeners and 410 listeners respectively.

Singles

As Small Talks

- "New Dork Pity" (2017)
- "Cop Car" (2017)
- "Oceans" (2019)
- "Quiet Sounds" (2019)
- "Nicotine & Tangerines" (2019)

As Cayley Spivey

- "SFU" (2020)
- "Not Over You Yet" (2020)
- "Cross The Line" (2021)
- "Bad For Each Other" (2021)
- "Ordinary" (feat. DazyFace) (2021)
- "Backseat Boyfriend" (2022)
- "Idol" (2023)
- "Movies" (2023)
- "ILY" (2023)
- "She's Pretty" (2023)
- "Worst Case Scenario" (2024) (Duet with Lyncs)
- "Ginny" (2024)
- "Fade Into The Room" (2025)
- "Reciprocal" (2025)
- "Camera Boy" (2025)

Studio albums

As Small Talks

- A Conversation Between Us (2019)

As Cayley Spivey

- Her (2023)

EPs

As Small Talks

- Until It Turns To Petals (2017)
- Quiet Sounds (2018)

As Cayley Spivey

- Bad For Each Other (2021)
- Camera Boy (stripped) (2025)
