= Warped Tour =

Annual traveling rock music festival

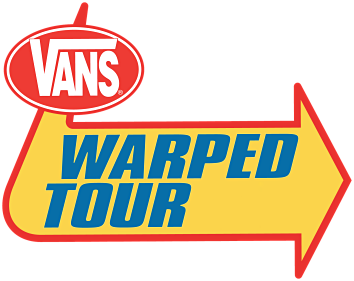
- Genre: Punk rock; alternative rock; pop-punk; emo; metalcore; ska punk
- Locations: United States; Canada; Australia; United Kingdom; Mexico
- Years active: 1995–2019, 2025–present
- Founders: Kevin Lyman
- Website: vanswarpedtour.com

The Warped Tour is a touring rock music festival that toured the United States and Canada each summer from 1995 until 2019, and returned in 2025 for its 30th anniversary. By 2015, Warped was the largest traveling music festival in the United States and the longest-running touring music festival in North America. Internationally, the festival stopped in Australia from 1998–2002 and again in 2013, as well as the United Kingdom in 2012 and 2015. The tour also features live professional wrestling matches from various promotions including Game Changer Wrestling (GCW) and Inter Species Wrestling.

Following the first Warped Tour, the skateboard shoe manufacturer Vans became the festival's title sponsor, when it then became known as the Vans Warped Tour.

Warped Tour was conceived by Kevin Lyman as an electric alternative rock festival, but later began focusing on punk rock music. Although it was primarily a punk rock festival, it covered diverse genres over the years.

Lyman said that the 2018 Vans Warped Tour would be the final, full cross-country run. On December 18, 2018, Lyman revealed details for the tour's 25th anniversary, with only three events in 2019.

In November 2019, rumors spread that Chris Fronzak planned to bring back the Warped Tour after Lyman's retirement. On October 4, 2020, Fronzak confirmed his intent to be involved in the return of Warped Tour; however, "for legal reasons it [could not] come back for 'three years or so'". In 2024, Lyman confirmed that Warped Tour would return in 2025, with the lineup being announced from January to February.

== Overview ==
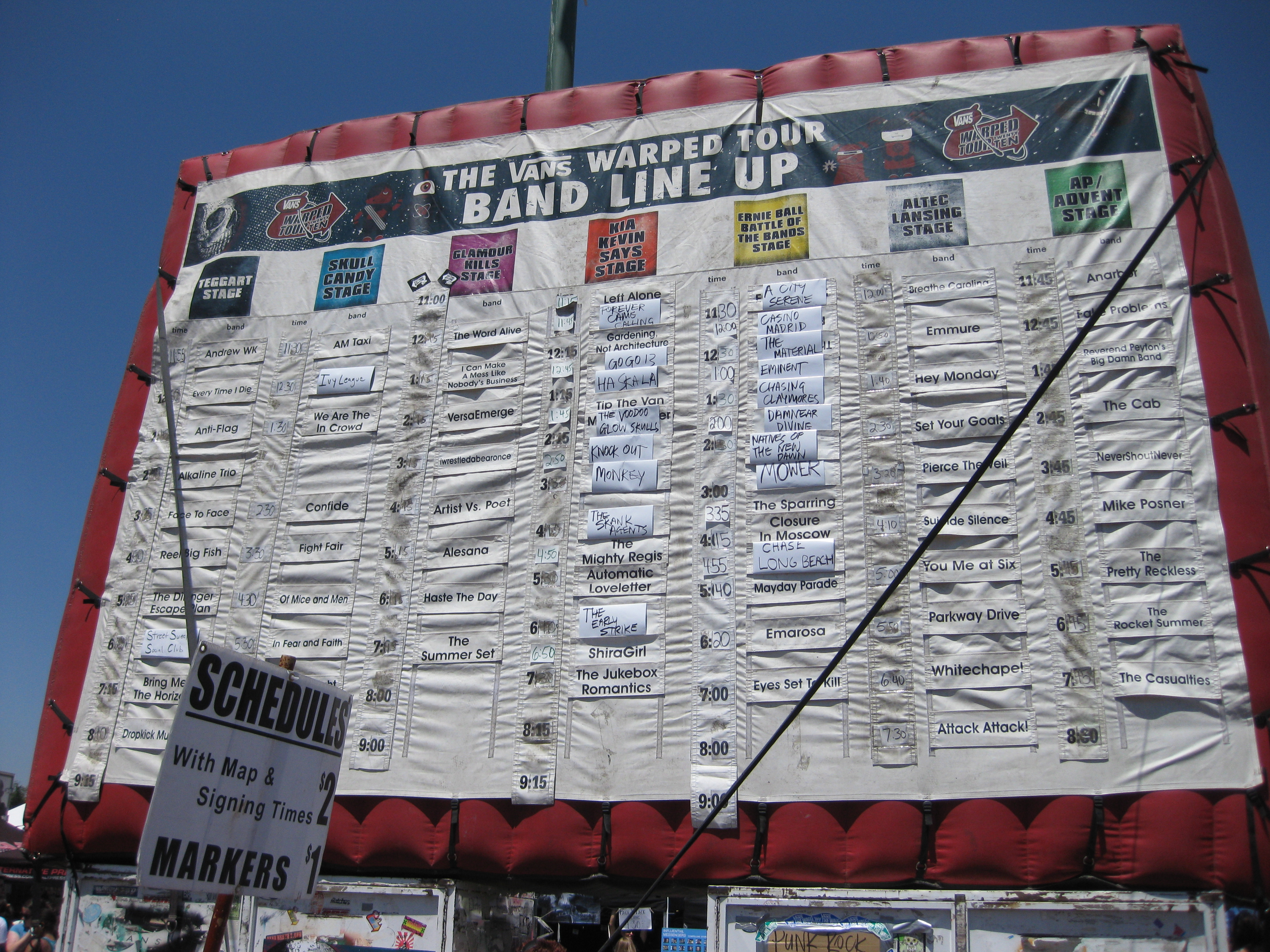
The performance schedule for the August 10, 2010 stop in Chula Vista, California, giving stages and set times for each act. Set times were determined on the day of the show and were posted for attendees on a large inflatable board.

Band performance times and sets were posted on an inflatable installation and were available in print for purchase from an on-site information stand.

Every year had a "BBQ Band". In exchange for the privilege of playing on the tour, the BBQ Band prepared the post-show barbecue for the bands and crew most evenings. Past BBQ Bands included the Dropkick Murphys, Art of Shock, and "The Fabulous Rudies". Similarly, one band, Animo (formerly DORK), was permitted for four years to play on the tour in exchange for working on the setup crew. The "BBQ Band" for the 2016 tour was Reckless Serenade.

The tour began as a skate punk and third-wave ska tour but later came to feature largely pop punk and metalcore acts. Some hardcore and street punk bands also participated, such as the Casualties, the Unseen and Anti-Flag.

The tour was not set up in a single fixed format; each show venue dictated a different layout. The event was set up in early morning and struck late the same day. Heading into Canada, a bus transported supplies while another bus held equipment not needed during the brief jaunt over the border.

Citing issues like transportation problems for minors and audience demographics trending younger each year, Kevin Lyman decided to let parents attend Warped Tour performances for free beginning in 2013. Parents had their own adult day care, known as Reverse Day Care. Grown-ups could spend the day waiting for their children in the Reverse Day Care tent, which offered ample seating, as well as fans or cooling devices to keep parents occupied during the festival.

== History ==
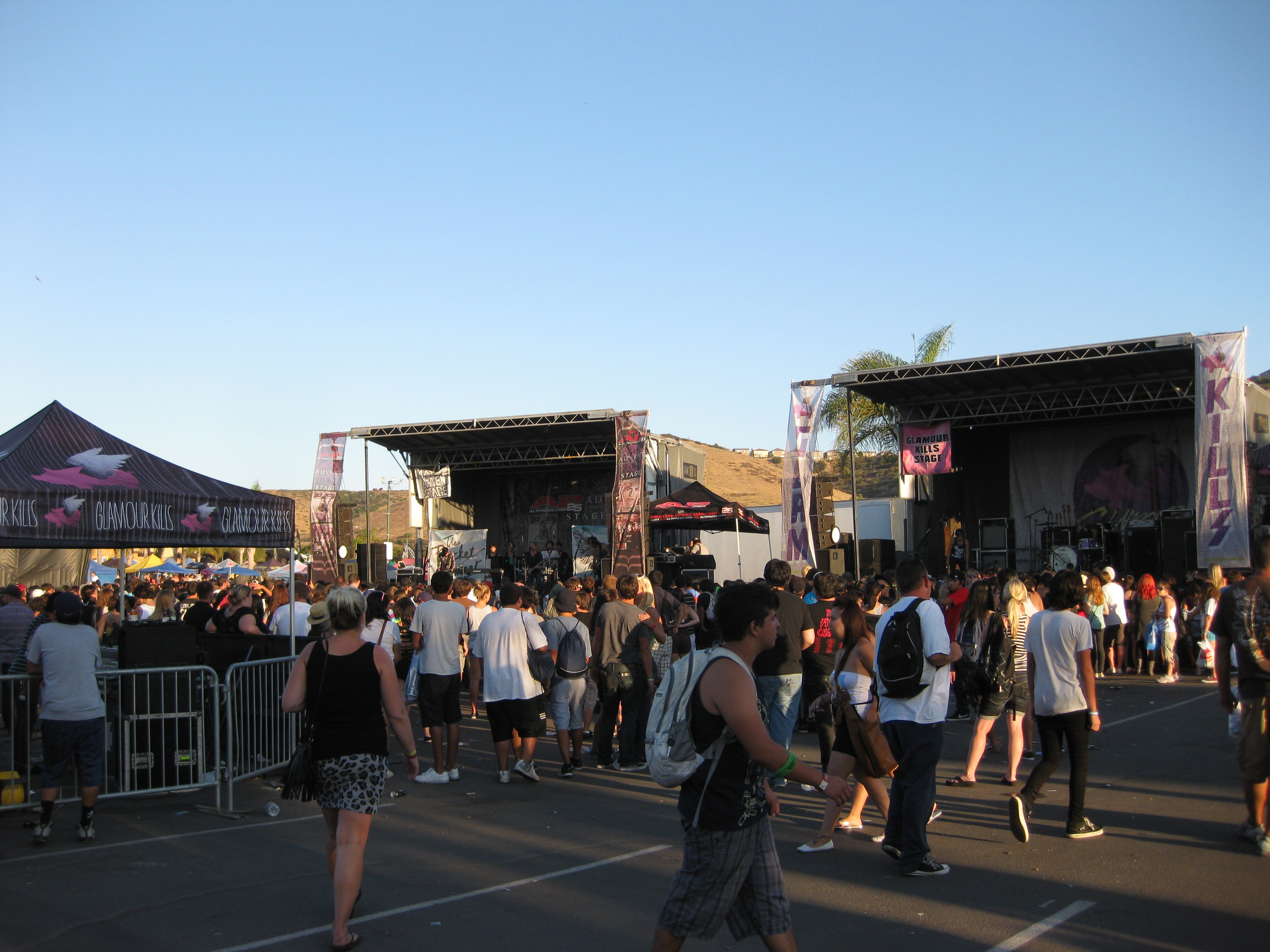
The Alternative Press/Advent stage (left) and Glamour Kills stage (right) on the 2010 tour, an example of the tour's side-by-side stage setup. Acts play alternating 30-minute set times on the two stages.

The Warped Tour was created in 1995 by Kevin Lyman and Ray Woodbury, president of RK Diversified Entertainment, in production with the short-lived Warp Magazine and Creative Artists Agency. The tour began June 21 at the Idaho Center in Nampa, Idaho, and ended August 18 at the Phoenix Plaza Amphitheater in Pontiac, Michigan.

In 2009, the two main stages were condensed into one and bands were given 40-minute sets, as opposed to the traditional 30 minutes across the previous two stages. Despite this, the tour decided to bring back the two main stages concept with 35-minute sets instead for the 2012 tour and beyond.

In 2012, the Warped Tour traveled to London, the first time the tour had left North America or Australia since 2002. In the UK and Europe, Warped Tour was operated by English promoter Kilimanjaro Live. The Warped Tour returned to London in 2015.

=== Warped Tour 1996 ===
The tour usually was held at outdoor venues, though on rare occasions it was held indoors. In 1996, due to problems with the event venue, the show was forced to move indoors to The Capitol Ballroom nightclub in Washington, D.C.

1996 was the first year for Vans as a sponsor; they remained the main sponsor thereafter.

=== Warped Tour 1997 ===
In 1997, the Vans Warped Tour went international and included venues in Europe, Canada, and the United States. Reed Glick was the manager for the international tour.

=== Warped Tour 1999 ===
In 1999, the tour started the new year in New Zealand, Australia, and Hawaii. After a pause, it resumed its North American tour in the continental United States through the summer, before finishing the tour in Europe.

=== Warped Tour 2009 ===
On February 10, 2009, details for the annual "Warped Tour Kick Off Party" were announced. The show took place April 2, 2009, at The Key Club in West Hollywood, California, and featured Warped Tour 2009 bands T.S.O.L., The Adolescents, Sing It Loud, TAT, and TV/TV on the bill. The tour won the Best Festival/Tour Award at the Rock on Request Awards.

=== Warped Tour 2012 ===
The Warped Tour 2012 kickoff party took place March 29, 2012, at Club Nokia in Los Angeles, California, featuring performances by Falling in Reverse, the Used, Yellowcard, Dead Sara, Matt Toka and Forever Came Calling. During the Toronto date, a fan fell unconscious during Chelsea Grin's performance and died. Both the band and Warped Tour offered their condolences on Twitter. For the first time in 14 years, the Warped Tour was held in the UK in November 2012. This was also the first year that the show Warped Roadies premiered. The show was a behind-the-scenes look at the inner workings of the Vans Warped Tour as it made its way across the country with more than 60 bands. Zach Booher of the band While We're Up was killed in a road accident in Wisconsin.

=== Warped Tour 2013 ===
The Warped Tour 2013 kick off party took place March 28, 2013, at Club Nokia in Los Angeles, California, featuring performances by Chiodos, New Beat Fund, Gin Wigmore, MC Lars, Craig Owens, Dia Frampton, Charlotte Sometimes, Big Chocolate, Echosmith, and special guests. The tour would again return to Europe for the second year in a row with more tour dates. For the first time since 2001, Warped Tour would also appear in Australia.

=== Warped Tour 2014 ===
The Warped Tour 2014 kick off party took place on April 1, 2014, at Club Nokia in Los Angeles, California, featuring performances by Bad Rabbits, Issues, One Ok Rock, Secrets, This Wild Life, To the Wind, Watsky, Chelsea Grin, Beartooth, Volumes, Buried In The Mountains, and others. The tour returned to Montreal for the first time in two years. On February 7, 2014, it was announced that the Warped Tour would visit Alaska for the first time for a pre-tour "The Road to Warped" show. The entire first date (June 13 at Houston) was streamed live on the tour's website. In June 2014, Kevin Lyman announced on Twitter that the UK segment of the 2014 tour would not go ahead. The San Diego stop was sponsored by Waveborn Sunglasses. As a part of celebrating the 20th anniversary of the tour, there were surprise appearances from two bands: Linkin Park played at Ventura, California on June 22, 2014, and A Day to Remember played at Chicago, Illinois, on July 19, 2014.

=== Warped Tour 2015 ===
The Warped Tour 2015 kickoff party took place on April 7, 2015, at Club Nokia in Los Angeles, California, featuring performances by As It Is, Bebe Rexha, New Years Day, Knuckle Puck, Metro Station, Candy Hearts, and New Beat Fund. The tour again visited Alaska for "The Road to Warped" show. The entire first date (June 19 at Pomona) again was streamed live on the tour's website. The tour returned to Europe playing at the Alexandra Palace in London, England on October 18.

Austin Jones, a former musician and a convicted sex offender, was due to take part in the 2015 tour until reports surfaced about his behavior and about tour founder Kevin Lyman's role in covering up Jones's actions.

=== Warped Tour 2016 ===
The Warped Tour 2016 announced the lineup on March 22 at its kickoff party at Full Sail University in Florida, featuring select performances by 2016 Warped bands. Headliners of this tour included Falling in Reverse, Less Than Jake, Good Charlotte, Sleeping with Sirens, New Found Glory, and others. The tour kicked off June 24, 2016, in Dallas, Texas, and hit 41 cities throughout the summer, ending in Portland, Oregon, on August 13, 2016. In addition to the 41 cities, there was a "Road to Warped Tour Alaska" on June 22, 2016.

=== Warped Tour 2017 ===
The Warped Tour 2017 announced the lineup on March 22 at its kickoff party at Full Sail University in Florida. Headliners (Bands playing the Journeys Sponsored Stages) of this tour include Andy Black, Beartooth, Dance Gavin Dance, I Prevail, and New Years Day, among others. The tour kicked off June 11, 2017, in Seattle, Washington, and would hit 41 cities throughout the summer, ending in Pomona, CA on August 6, 2017. In addition to the 41 cities, an additional show was planned with a separate lineup in Toluca, Mexico, on May 27, 2017, plus a "Warped Rewind at Sea" cruise to sail between New Orleans, Louisiana, and Cozumel, Mexico, from October 28 to November 1, 2017.

=== Warped Tour 2018 ===
On November 15, 2017, Kevin Lyman announced that the 2018 Warped Tour would be the final tour. "I am so grateful to have worked with more than 1,700 bands over the last 23 summers", Lyman said in his announcement. "I wish I could thank every band that has played the tour." Warped Tour also announced it would play in Japan for 2018. Headliners for the Japan segment were listed as Korn (which had not played the festival previously), Prophets of Rage, and Limp Bizkit (who appeared at Warped Tour 1997)

=== Warped Tour 2019 ===
On December 18, 2018, Lyman revealed details for the tour's 25th anniversary, taking place in 2019.

Warped Tour took place in Cleveland, Ohio, June 8, 2019, Atlantic City, New Jersey, June 29 and 30, 2019, and Mountain View, California, on July 20 and 21, 2019.

=== Warped Tour 2025 ===
On September 11, 2024, Rock Feed reported that Warped Tour would return in 2025 for "a series of festivals" to celebrate its 30th anniversary, and that both founder Lyman and Live Nation would be involved. On September 17, Lyman told Pollstar "We have something cooking for 2025. Details should be ready in a few weeks." A month later, on October 17, three festivals were announced for 2025, taking place in Washington, D.C. on June 14 and 15, followed by Long Beach, California on July 26 and 27, and Orlando, Florida on November 15 and 16. It was revealed that Insomniac would assist in producing the festivals. Both the D.C. and Long Beach dates sold out on November 1. On January 27, 2025, Warped Tour's social media accounts began announcing bands daily until February 26, when the full lineups were released.

=== Warped Tour 2026 ===
In an October 2024 interview with Rolling Stone, Lyman mentioned the possibility of adding more dates in the coming years, saying "If it works, we'll look to the future to do more." In June 2025, due to the overwhelming success of the D.C. festival, it was announced that the Warped Tour would return for another two-day event in D.C. on June 13-14, 2026. In November 2025, it was announced that the Vans Warped Tour would also return for another two-day event at the Long Beach Convention Center in Long Beach, California on July 25-26, 2026, as well as Orlando, Florida on November 14-15, 2026 at Camping World Stadium. In addition to the returning locations, it was announced that two new international locations will added to the 2026 Warped Tour. The tour will include a two-day event at Jean-Drapeau Park in Montreal, Quebec, Canada on August 21-22, 2026, and Mexico City, Mexico at the Autodromo Hermanos Rodriguez on September 12-13, 2026.

== Legacy ==
Warped Tour became a launching pad for many up-and-coming artists. The festival was credited with bringing unknown artists like Black Veil Brides, Avenged Sevenfold, Blink-182, Sum 41, Limp Bizkit, My Chemical Romance, Fall Out Boy, Paramore, Machine Gun Kelly, Bebe Rexha, Katy Perry, and Yelawolf to the spotlight.

The Warped Tour gave artists like will.i.am and The Black Eyed Peas an opportunity and venue to perform. Black Eyed Peas were featured on the 1999 Vans Warped Tour. According to will.i.am, the Black Eyed Peas were the first group not categorized as "punk" to play at Warped Tour.

== Tours by year ==
- Warped Tour 1995
- Warped Tour 1996
- Warped Tour 1997
- Warped Tour 1998
- Warped Tour 1999
- Warped Tour 2000
- Warped Tour 2001
- Warped Tour 2002
- Warped Tour 2003
- Warped Tour 2004
- Warped Tour 2005
- Warped Tour 2006
- Warped Tour 2007
- Warped Tour 2008
- Warped Tour 2009
- Warped Tour 2010
- Warped Tour 2011
- Warped Tour 2012
- Warped Tour 2013
- Warped Tour 2014
- Warped Tour 2015
- Warped Tour 2016
- Warped Tour 2017
- Warped Tour 2018
- Warped Tour 2019
- Warped Tour 2025
- Warped Tour 2026

== Music lessons ==
Musicians on the Vans Warped Tour gave lessons. Percussive Marketing Council teamed up with the Vans Warped Tour and offered free drum lessons at the Lesson Lab tent to concertgoers. These music lessons were for those who were learning to play drums for the first time. The lessons used electronic drum sets and acoustic drum sets. According to PMC Advisory Board Member Billy Cuthrell, having drum teachers from other percussion stores is the "key" to the free lessons program.

In 2005, the Vans Warped tour incorporated a multiple level stage that consisted of two levels for the band Street Drum Corps.

Music education was a big part of the Vans Warped Tour. Throughout the years, the Warped Tour used the John Lennon Bus to achieve this. The John Lennon Bus, essentially a mobile studio, was started by Brian Rothschild and Yoko Ono in 1968. The goal of the John Lennon Bus was to offer music education from performing artists to people, particularly young people, who attended the Warped Tour. Brian Roschild was executive director of the John Lennon Bus. Artists like Eminem and Bowling For Soup visited the tour bus. Other celebrities to use the bus included Fergie from the Black Eyed Peas, Natasha Bedingfield, and John Legend.

== Battle of the Bands ==
The Ernie Ball Battle of the Bands took place at Warped Tour every year. Over 10,000 bands tried out for the battle of the bands in 2005. The bands performed at their local Warped tour date and were judged by music industry professionals. If the bands did well in the competition, they were invited to perform as a side stage act on the Ernie Ball Stage of the Vans Warped Tour.

== Reception and controversies ==
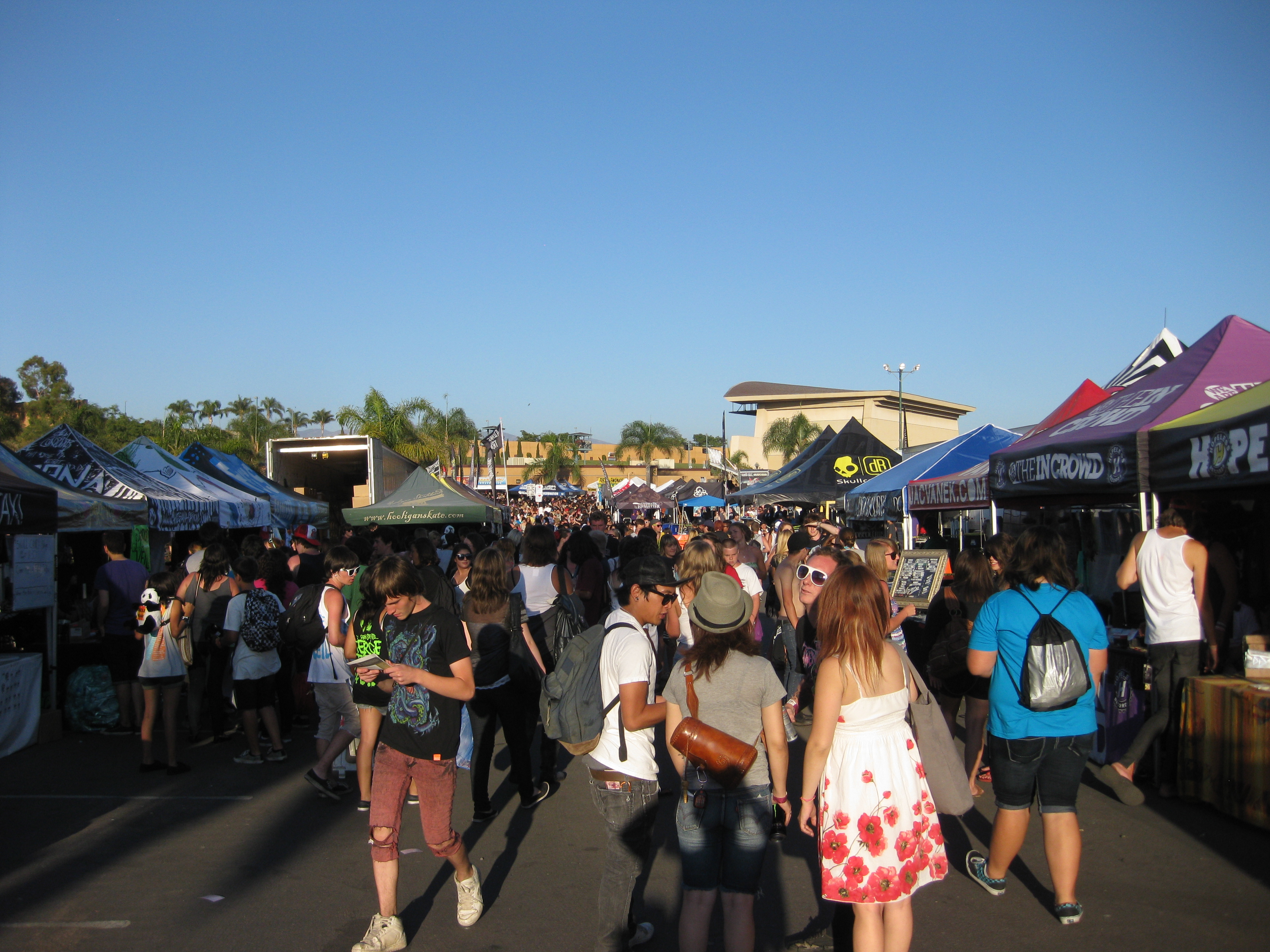
Artist, record label, and sponsor tents occupy the central area of the tour stops, selling merchandise and holding autograph signings (2010).

"Warped Tour is a place for teenage kids to go and hear all their favorite bands in one day," says Rob Pasalic, guitarist for The Saint Alvia Cartel. "It wouldn't make sense for it to be the same tour in 2007 as it was in 1997. These are the bands that kids like, and the tour is smart enough to grow and adapt to that. You still get bands like Bad Religion playing, so it's not like it's lost all its roots."

In 2006, Joe Queer of The Queers stated:

You play music because there's something inside of you that says you have to play music. Now you get bands like Fall Out Boy that are basically created in the studio. The Warped Tour changed it. Fuck it. I just don't like that shit. All the guys in the bands remind me of the jocks I hated in high school. To me a punk gig is a small sweaty club with the audience right in your face knocking over the mic stand and boogying off the energy.

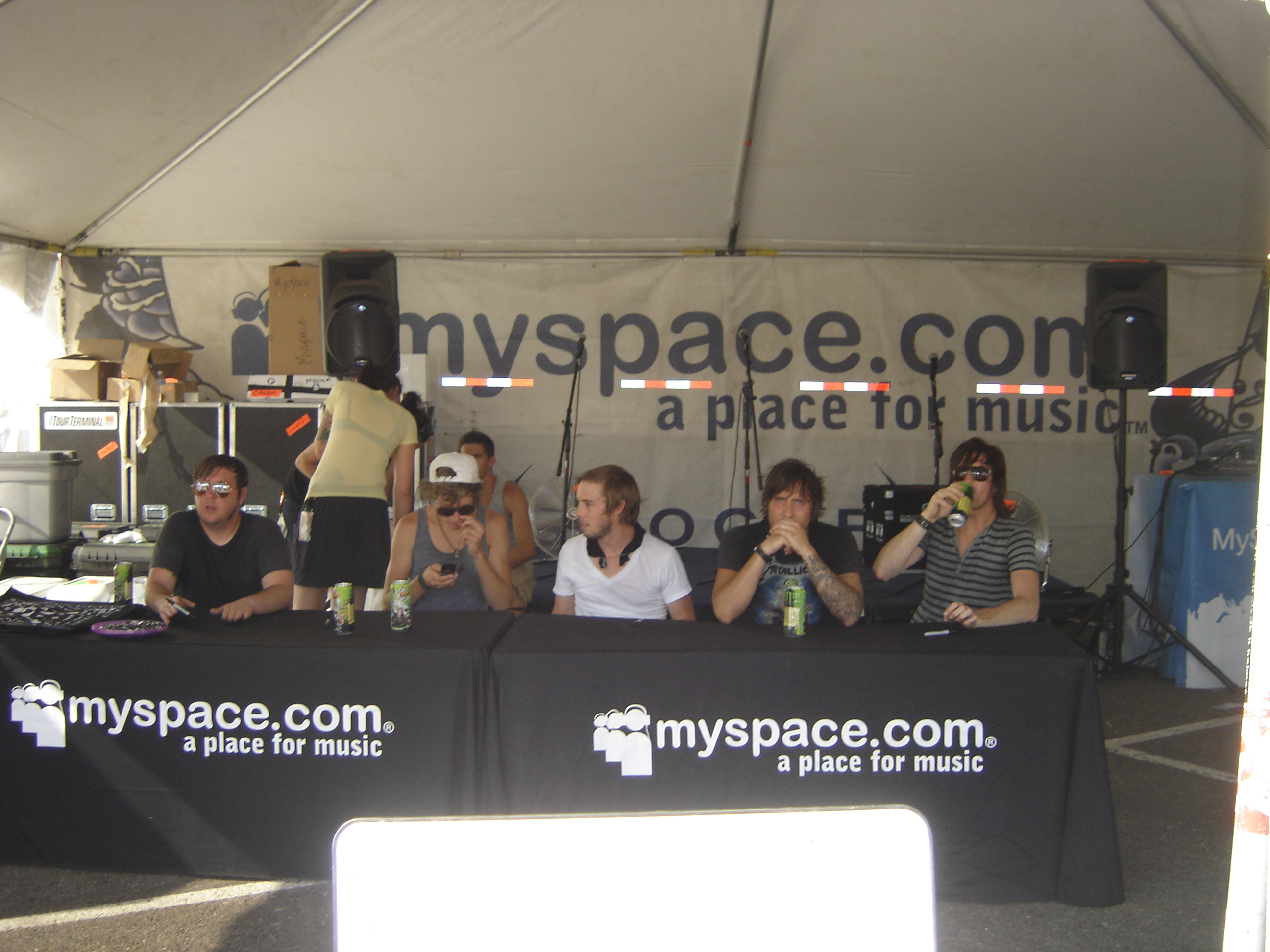
Anberlin preparing for a meet-and-greet at the MySpace tent on the 2007 tour. Performers often meet with fans and sign autographs at the various artist and sponsor tents.

Keith Morris said, "These kids that are [playing] on the Warped Tour, they should have no choice but to go into the military, and go off to some desert somewhere and spend some time in the desert, rather than having some big, ultra mega record company giving them lots of money and paying for their hotels and buses, making sure their hair is trendy, and that they are wearing the proper clothes that all the kids like and wear, and all that fun shit." Morris's band the Circle Jerks would later appear on the 2007 edition of the tour.

In 2013, Oliver Sykes, lead vocalist of Bring Me the Horizon, took to Twitter to announce that he was no longer allowed to start a mosh pit/wall of death. Kevin Lyman took to Twitter as well to say that audience members could create mosh pits and walls of death, but that someone in the audience had to initiate them rather than any band member because then they would be taking responsibility for any injuries, which could then lead to costly lawsuits.

On 1 July 2015, it was announced that Jake McElfresh's music act Front Porch Step would play the Nashville, Tennessee, tour stop. Many bands, including The Wonder Years, Senses Fail, Handguns, and Beartooth, asked attendees to boycott McElfresh's set. The Wonder Years' lead singer Dan "Soupy" Campbell, who was supposed to perform after Front Porch Step on the Acoustic Basement Stage, asked fans to go see Man Overboard at 1:15 pm, the time the acoustic set would take place. Lyman responded by saying,

He was only supposed to be here long enough to play his show but the weather today has been putting us behind schedule. He wasn't added to the tour, so those claims that he was "added to sell tickets" are completely groundless.

He also said that, because McElfresh had still not been formally charged with misconduct, he agreed to have him perform. "If he was a danger to anyone, he simply would not have been here."

On July 11, 2016, Vans Warped Tour announced that Virginia pro-life organization Rock for Life would be among the vendors on their 41 tour dates. Rock for Life were known for co-opting punk aesthetics with their logo of a fetus playing a guitar and T-shirts with the phrase "All Lives Matter". Bands such as Safe to Say and Old Wounds spoke out against the organization, with Safe to Say replying to Rock for Life's tweet, saying

Yes. Everyday. We are a pro choice band. A tent telling young women what to do with their body has no place here.

On June 26, 2017, a video surfaced that showed the punk rock band The Dickies verbally abusing a crowd member after protests against the band, including signs that said "Our teenage girls don't need to be subjected to derogatory jokes by a disgusting old man" and "Punk isn't predatory", took place. While Lyman initially said that the band was no longer on the Warped Tour roster, he released a statement on 1 July that said the band had not been kicked off the tour and that the altercation was between the band's frontman, Leonard Graves Phillips, and a member of the touring party.

I thought it was time to put the facts out since I have watched false information floating around. A video has been circulating of a confrontation between Leonard from the Dickies and a fan. Fact – it was not a fan, but a member of the touring party. The member of the touring party was standing next to the PA with a sign protesting some of the things they found offensive about the band's jokes, and props on stage. During one of the last songs, they went towards the barricade and directed the sign at the band. After a verbal barrage from Leonard, the member of the touring party threw the sign at Leonard and left the area. I do not condone verbal or physical violence whatsoever. The Dickies, last day of the tour was that Sunday, which had always been scheduled. These are the facts of what took place and this is why I ask anyone who has an issue with anyone else on tour to come sit under my tent with me and express their views diplomatically. On this year's tour, we have many people who may not agree with each other, but as humans we should be able to express our points of view in a civil manner. If we have any hope to progress as a society, communication will be key in moving forward.

=== Band conflicts ===
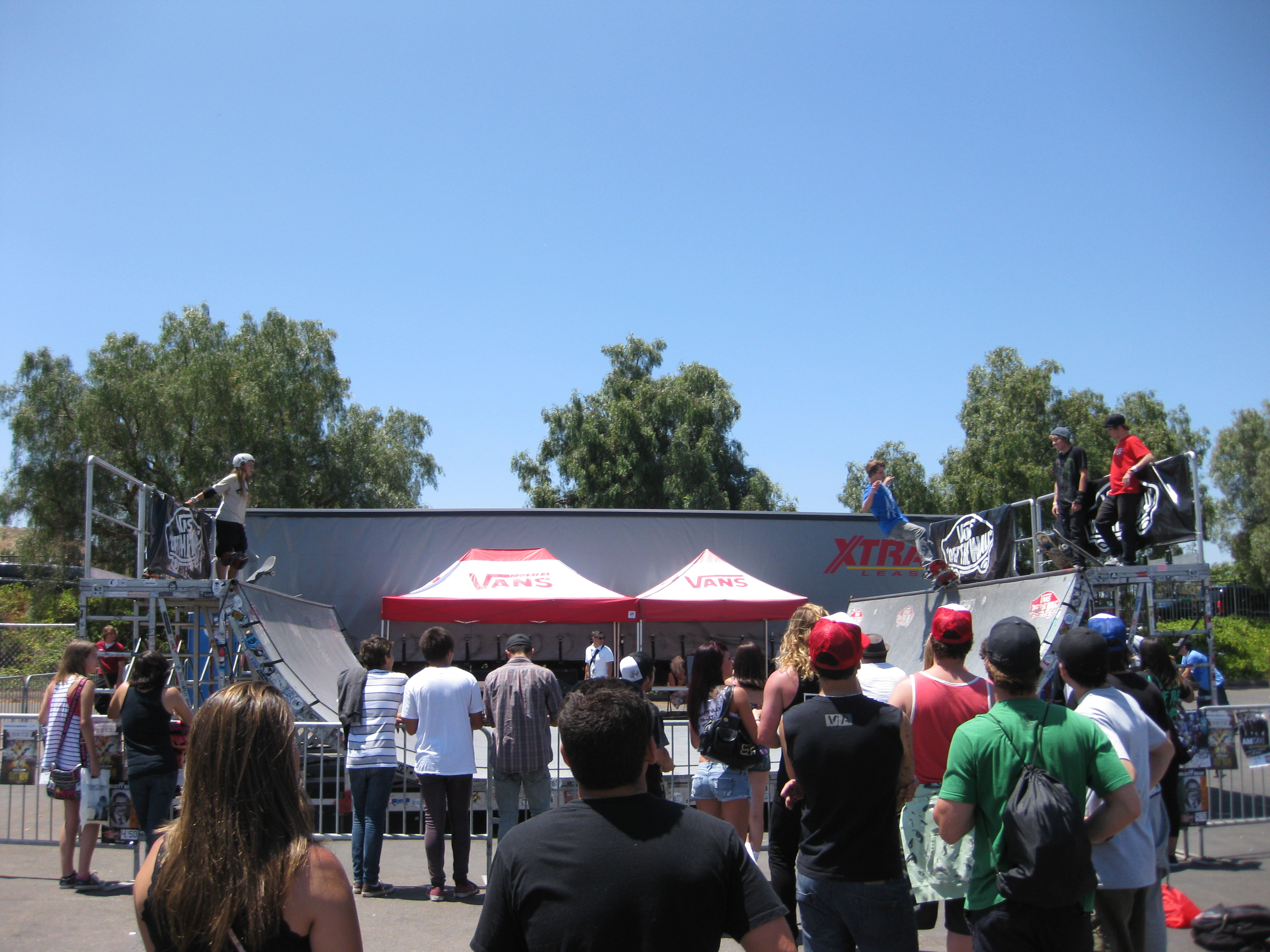
Athletes perform exhibitions of skateboarding, BMX biking, and other sports on half-pipes and other ramps during the tour. Attendees are often also permitted to participate.

A few bands have left the tour due to conflicts they had with the tour or other bands:

- Both D12 and Esham were kicked out of the 2001 tour. D12 allegedly attacked Esham because he mentioned Eminem's daughter in his song "Chemical Imbalance". Eminem was not present during this incident.
- The band Guttermouth was supposedly removed from the Warped Tour 2004 for insulting Simple Plan. The band later stated that they left on their own because "'10 or so' unnamed bands didn't jibe with Guttermouth's way of doing business and, in some cases, threatened them with violence".
- The band Slaves was kicked off the tour in 2015 after lead singer Jonny Craig sexually assaulted and harassed a merchandise table worker.
- The band Islander was kicked off the tour after Mikey Carvajal jumped into a backline drum kit onstage and damaged it during their live set in Denver on July 1, 2018.

== Sponsorship ==
The Vans Warped Tour was sponsored by Vans, and in the final years Journeys joined as sponsor. Kevin Lyman was offered sponsorship from Calvin Klein before eventually working with Vans. The tour also was sponsored by Samsung, which enabled the bands and fans to interact with one another. The schedule for the day was sent out to fans on the day of their show. Samsung also sponsored a reverse day care for the Warped tour, which let parents cool off while their children watched their favorite bands. Warped Tour also partnered with other technology companies like Cingular Wireless, Apple Computer, and others. This enabled these companies to reach younger audiences. The communications manager from Memorex said that Warped Tour let them reach a younger demographic because of the music that these people are "passionate about." At one point in time, Warped Tour also provided internet access to attendees while at the festival. Chaos Mobile was formed by Kevin Lyman and John Reese of Freeze Artist Management.

== Activism and philanthropy ==
Activism was a major component of the Vans Warped Tour and allowed non-profit organizations to advocate for their causes, such as Invisible Children, To Write Love on Her Arms, Shirts for a Cure, Keep a Breast Foundation, and Hope for the Day. Other causes presented at Warped Tour were Music Saves Lives and Earth Echo. Earth Echo promoted recycling and provided a solar-powered stage. Keep A Breast was another organization on the Vans Warped Tour. Keep A Breast educates women about breast cancer and preventative measures against the disease. The organization worked in conjunction with the Girlz Garage on the Vans Warped Tour. People who donated to the cause were given T-shirts signed by artists on the tour to spread awareness of breast cancer.

Since 2001, the traveling tour was affiliated with People for the Ethical Treatment of Animals (PETA), including food vendors and booths that distributed information about animal rights and veganism.

In March 2016, it was announced that Warped Tour would team up with A Voice for the Innocent to address the issue of sex crimes in the music scene. The Vans Warped Tour contributed 25 cents from every ticket sold to an organization called Hollywood Heart. Warped Tour also gave money to the relief efforts for Hurricane Katrina. Warped Tour and the Taste of Chaos (a festival) worked together to contribute $500,000.

== Musical equipment ==
Bands on the Warped Tour often brought their own musical equipment, but Industrial Sound also provided equipment for band use, according to lead sound engineer Daniel Bonneau. He also said that the bands had to do line checks instead of traditional soundchecks.

== Official compilation albums ==
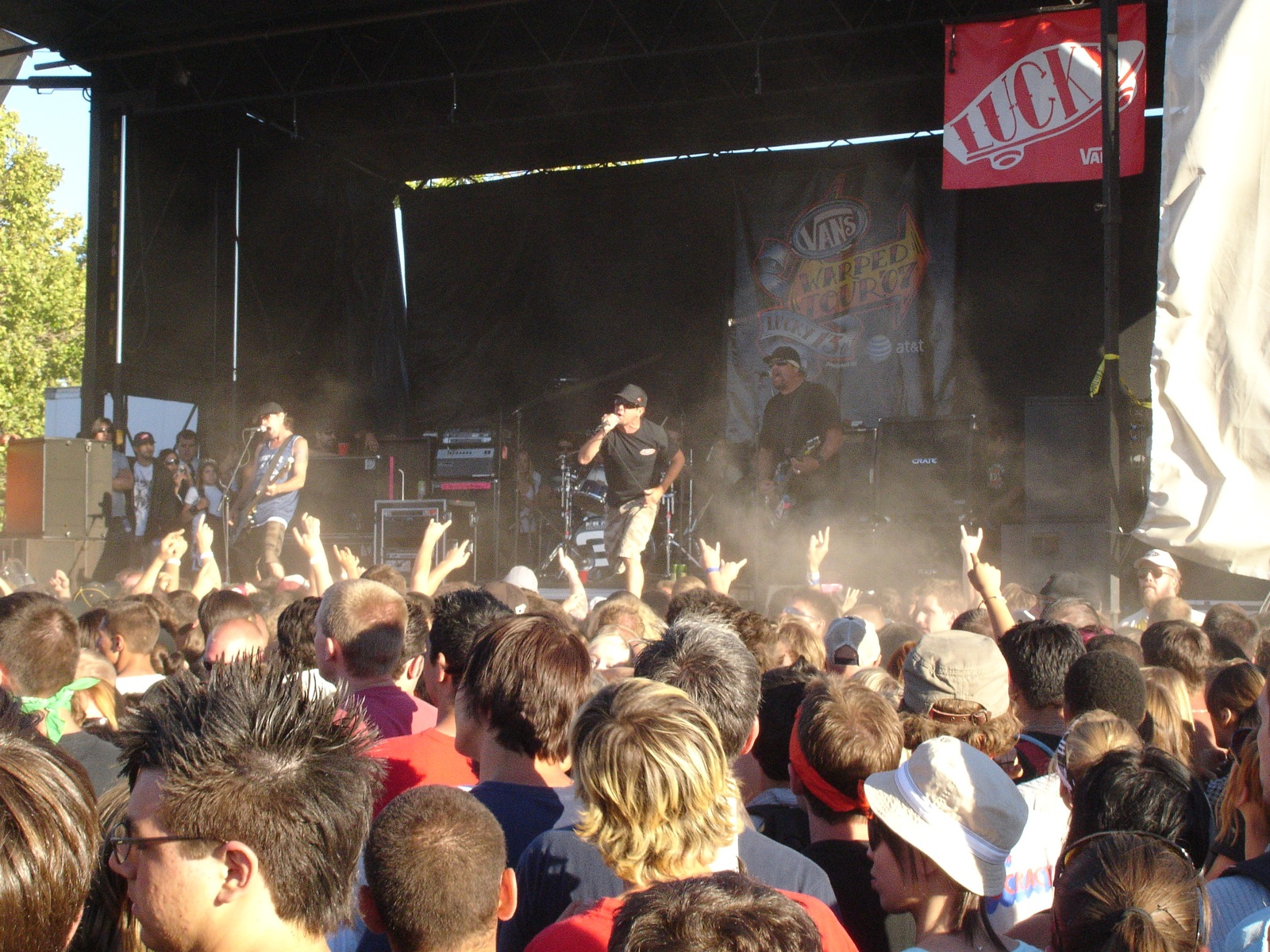
Pennywise performing at Warped Tour 2007.

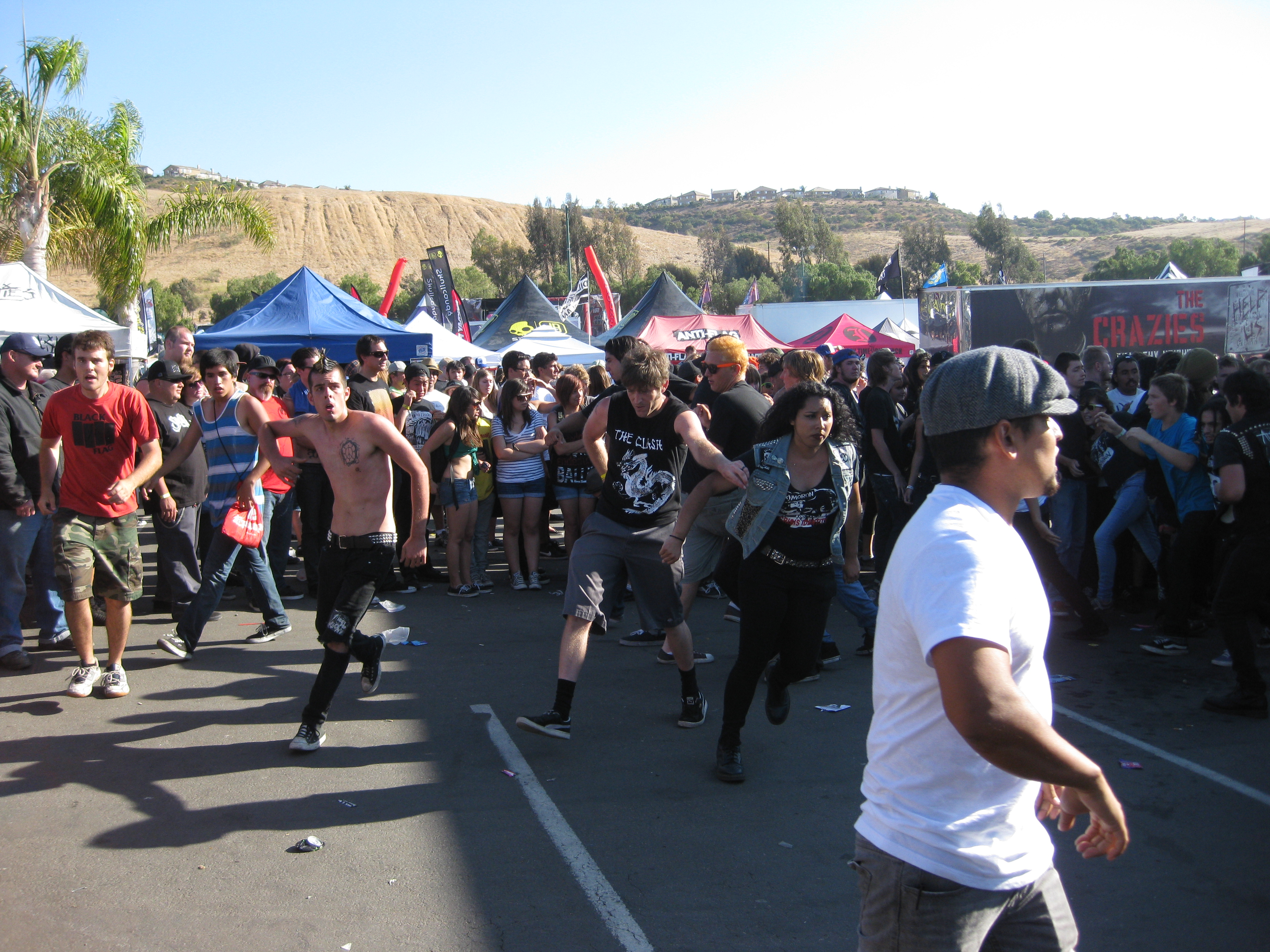
Attendees moshing in a circle pit on the 2010 tour.

An official Warped Tour compilation CD was released annually by SideOneDummy Records to coincide with the start of the tour. Before 1998, official releases were handled by Vans via Uni Distribution in 1996 and Epitaph Records in 1997, respectively. The compilation included songs by numerous artists performing on the tour that year. The first few compilations had varying titles, but starting in 2001 the series used a standard title with the format "Warped Tour (year) Tour Compilation". In 2002, the compilation expanded onto two CDs, totaling 50 artists, a format which the series followed in all its subsequent years. The Warped Tour compilation album in 2002 charted at number 55. Since the return of the tour in 2025, the compilation is now handled by Smartpunk Records.

Year	Title
1996	Vans Warped Music Sampler 1996
1997	Vans Warped Tour '97 Presents Punk-O-Rama Vol. 2.1
1998	A Compilation of Warped Music
1999	A Compilation of Warped Music II
2000	World Warped III Live
2001	Warped Tour 2001 Tour Compilation
2002	Warped Tour 2002 Tour Compilation
2003	Warped Tour 2003 Tour Compilation
2004	Warped Tour 2004 Tour Compilation
2005	Warped Tour 2005 Tour Compilation
2006	Warped Tour 2006 Tour Compilation
2007	Warped Tour 2007 Tour Compilation
2008	Warped Tour 2008 Tour Compilation
2009	Warped Tour 2009 Tour Compilation
2010	Warped Tour 2010 Tour Compilation
2011	Warped Tour 2011 Tour Compilation
2012	Warped Tour 2012 Tour Compilation
2013	Warped Tour 2013 Tour Compilation
2014	Warped Tour 2014 Tour Compilation
2015	Warped Tour 2015 Tour Compilation
2016	Warped Tour 2016 Tour Compilation
2017	Warped Tour 2017 Tour Compilation
2018	Warped Tour 2018 Tour Compilation
2025	Warped Tour 2025 Tour Compilation
2026	Warped Tour 2026 Tour Compilation

In addition, the digital music service Rhapsody.com released a regular "Warped Tour Bootleg Series", with each entry focusing on a single artist's performances on the tour. Bootleg Series artists included Matchbook Romance, My Chemical Romance, Bedouin Soundclash, MxPx, The Starting Line, Millencolin, Avenged Sevenfold, Gogol Bordello, Motion City Soundtrack, The Casualties, Anti-Flag, Less Than Jake, Rise Against, Joan Jett & The Blackhearts, Helmet, and The Academy Is...

== See also ==
- List of Warped Tour lineups by year
- List of punk rock festivals
- List of historic rock festivals
