= Four Year Strong discography =

- Studio albums: 8
- EPs: 5
- Compilation albums: 1
- Singles: 8
- Music videos: 14

The discography of Four Year Strong, an American rock band, consists of eight studio albums, one compilation album, five extended plays and eight singles.

== Albums ==
=== Studio albums ===
List of studio albums
Title	Details	Peak chart positions		
Title	Details	US	US Alt	US Indie
It's Our Time	Released: January 29, 2005; Label: Open Your Eyes; Format: CD-R, DL	—	—	—
Rise or Die Trying	Released: September 18, 2007; Label: I Surrender; Format: CD, DL, LP	—	—	—
Explains It All	Released: July 21, 2009; Label: I Surrender/Decaydance; Format: CD, DL, LP	115	—	22
Enemy of the World	Released: March 9, 2010; Label: I Surrender/Decaydance/Universal Motown; Format: CD, DL, LP	47	6	—
In Some Way, Shape, or Form	Released: November 8, 2011; Label: I Surrender/Decaydance/Universal Republic; Format: CD, DL, LP	88	12	—
Four Year Strong	Released: June 2, 2015; Label: Pure Noise; Format: CD, CS, DL, LP	77	6	8
Brain Pain	Released: February 28, 2020; Label: Pure Noise; Format: CD, DL, LP	175	—	—
Analysis Paralysis	Release date: August 9, 2024; Label: Pure Noise; Format: CD, DL, LP	—	—	—
"—" denotes a release that did not chart.

=== Compilation albums ===
List of compilation albums
Title	Details	Peak chart positions
Title	Details	US Indie
Some of You Will Like This, Some of You Won't	Released: September 8, 2017; Label: Pure Noise; Format: CD, DL, LP	21

== Extended plays ==
List of extended plays
Title	Details	Peak chart positions		
Title	Details	US	US Alt	US Indie
All the Lonely Girls EP	Released: November 22, 2002; Label: Self-released; Format: CD, DL	—	—	—
The Glory EP	Released: 2003; Label: Self-released; Format: CD, DL	—	—	—
3-Track Demo	Released: 2004; Label: Self-released; Format: CD, DL	—	—	—
Demo	Released: 2005; Label: Self-released; Format: CD, DL	—	—	—
Go Down in History	Released: July 22, 2014; Label: Pure Noise; Format: CD, DL, 12" vinyl	47	12	10
"—" denotes a release that did not chart.

== Singles ==
Title	Year	Album
"Bada Bing! Wit' a Pipe"	2008	Rise or Die Trying
"It Must Really Suck to Be Four Year Strong Right Now" (Note: Also released on 7" vinyl under the name It's Not the Size of the 7-inch... It's How You Use It with "Cavalier" as the B-side.)	2009	Enemy of the World
"Wasting Time (Eternal Summer)"	2010	Enemy of the World
"Tonight We Feel Alive (On a Saturday)"	2010	Enemy of the World
"Just Drive"	2011	In Some Way, Shape, or Form
"Falling on You" (Note: Released on 7" vinyl under the name AP Tour 2011 with "A Dolphin Is Just a Shark with a Smile" as the B-side.)	2011	In Some Way, Shape, or Form
"Somewhere in My Memory"	2016	Non-album single
"We All Float Down Here"	2017	Some of You Will Like This, Some of You Won't

== Other appearances ==
Title	Year	Album
"Dumpweed" (Blink-182 cover)	2005	A Tribute to Blink 182: Pacific Ridge Records Heroes of Pop-Punk
"Heroes Get Remembered, Legends Never Die" (alternative version)	2007	Punk the Clock Vol. III: Property of a Gentleman
"So Hot, and You Sweat on It" (PureVolume sessions)	2009	Take Action! Volume 8
"Love Song" (Sara Bareilles cover)	2009	Punk Goes Pop 2

== Music videos ==
Title	Year	Director
"Heroes Get Remembered, Legends Never Die"	2007	
"Bada Bing! Wit' a Pipe!"	2008	
"It Must Really Suck to Be Four Year Strong Right Now"	2010	
"Tonight We Feel Alive (On a Saturday)"	2010	
"Stuck in the Middle"	2011	
"Just Drive"	2011	
"Go Down in History"	2014	
"Stolen Credit Card"	2015	Kyle Thrash
"Who Cares?"	2016	Marlon Brandope
"Men Are from Mars, Women Are from Hell"	2017	
"Abandon Ship or Abandon All Hope"	2017	
"Nice to Know"	2018	
"Talking Myself in Circles"	2020	
"Learn to Love the Lie"	2020	Miguel Barbosa
"Get Out of My Head"	2020	Miguel Barbosa and Four Year Strong
"It's Cool"	2020	
"Brain Pain"	2020	
"Uncooked"	2024	Benjamin Lieber
