= Four Year Strong (album) =

Studio album by Four Year Strong
- Released: June 2, 2015
- Recorded: God City Studios
- Genre: Pop punk, post-hardcore
- Length: 38:18
- Label: Pure Noise
- Producer: Kurt Ballou, Four Year Strong, Machine

Four Year Strong chronology
| Go Down in History (2014) | Four Year Strong (2015) | Brain Pain (2020) |

Four Year Strong is the sixth studio album by American pop punk band Four Year Strong. It was their first full-length release since 2011's In Some Way, Shape, or Form.

== Production ==
Described by vocalist/guitarist Dan O'Connor as being "one of the most raw records we've ever made, it's just us playing. No fancy computer shit. Made for singing along and head-banging." "Go Down in History" was re-recorded for the album, with the original version appearing on the Go Down in History EP the previous year.

The album was produced by the band and Kurt Ballou at God City Studios. Ballou also engineered and mixed the sessions with additional help from Robert Cheeseman and Phil Dubnick. "Go Down in History" was produced and mixed by Machine. Brad Boatright mastered the album at Audiosiege.

== Release ==
In March 2015, the group headlined the Pure Noise Records Tour, with support from Hit the Lights, Forever Came Calling and Light You Up. On April 2, Four Year Strong was announced for release in June. Alongside this, the album's artwork and track listing were revealed. The album's artwork and layout was produced by Ryan Eyestone. On April 9, "We All Float Down Here" was made available for streaming. On April 27, a lyric video was released for "I'm a Big, Bright, Shining Star". On May 12, "Eating My Words" was made available for streaming. In May and June, the band supported the Story So Far on their tour across the US; the stint included appearances at the Spring Fling and Skate & Surf festivals.

Four Year Strong was made available for streaming through Fuse's website on May 27, before being released on June 2. In September and October, they group embarked on a headlining US tour, with main support from Defeater. Other acts throughout the tour included: Expire, Speak Low If You Speak Love, My Iron Lung, Superheaven and Elder Brother. A music video was released for "Stolen Credit Card!" on September 2, directed by Kyle Thrash. A music video for "Who Cares?", directed by Marlon Brandope, premiered on Warped Tour's website on May 23, 2016. Following this, the group performed at the Slam Dunk Festival in the UK, and on Warped Tour between June and August. In November, the group supported Good Charlotte on their headlining US tour.

== Reception ==
Professional ratings
Aggregate scores
| Source | Rating |
|---|---|
| Metacritic | 83/100 |
Review scores
| Source | Rating |
| AllMusic | Favorable |
| Dead Press! | 8/10 stars |
| DIY | 4/5 stars |
| Ox-Fanzine | 4.5/5 stars |
| Punknews.org | 4.5/5 stars |
| Sputnikmusic | 3.9/5 |

The album was included at number 36 on Rock Sound's top 50 releases of 2015 list. The album charted at number 77 on the Billboard 200 chart in the U.S., number 100 in Australia and number 126 in the UK.

== Track listing ==
| No. | Title | Song Title Reference | Length |
|---|---|---|---|
| 1. | "I Hold Myself in Contempt" | Title was said in the movie Liar Liar | 4:16 |
| 2. | "We All Float Down Here" | Title from the Stephen King novel It | 3:07 |
| 3. | "Eating My Words" | | 3:12 |
| 4. | "Wipe Yourself Off, Man. You Dead." | Title was said in the movie Rush Hour | 3:31 |
| 5. | "Stolen Credit Card!" | Title was said in the movie Home Alone 2 | 3:51 |
| 6. | "Gravity" | | 3:45 |
| 7. | "Who Cares?" | | 1:54 |
| 8. | "Here's to Swimming with Bow-Legged Women" | Title was said in the movie Jaws | 3:25 |
| 9. | "I'm a Big, Bright, Shining Star" | Title was said in the movie Boogie Nights | 3:33 |
| 10. | "The Sound of Your Heart" | | 3:59 |
| 11. | "Go Down in History" | | 3:39 |
| Total length: | | | 38:18 |

== Personnel ==
Personnel per booklet.

Four Year Strong

- Alan Day – vocals, guitars
- Dan O'Connor – vocals, guitars
- Jake Massucco – drums
- Joe Weiss – bass

Production

- Kurt Ballou – engineer, mixing, producer
- Four Year Strong – producer
- Robert Cheeseman – additional engineering
- Phil Dubnick – additional engineering
- Brad Boatright – mastering
- Machine – producer and mixing on "Go Down in History"
- Alex Garcia-Rivera – drum tech
- Ryan Eyestone – artwork, layout

== Charts ==
| Chart (2015) | Peak position |
|---|---|
| Australian Albums (ARIA) | 100 |
| US Billboard 200 | 77 |
| US Top Rock Albums (Billboard) | 10 |
| US Top Alternative Albums (Billboard) | 6 |
| US Independent Albums (Billboard) | 8 |
| UK Albums (OCC) | 126 |
