= Around the World and Back =

Studio album by State Champs
- Released: October 16, 2015
- Recorded: February 13 – March 27, 2015
- Genre: Pop-punk
- Length: 36:15
- Label: Pure Noise
- Producers: Kyle Black, Derek Discanio, Howard Benson

State Champs chronology
The Finer Things (2013)	Around the World and Back (2015)	Living Proof (2018)

Singles from Around the World and Back
- 1. "Secrets" Released: July 16, 2015; 2. "Losing Myself" Released: August 9, 2015; 3. "All You Are Is History" Released: September 1, 2015; 4. "Slow Burn" Released: March 30, 2017

Around the World and Back is the second studio album by American pop-punk band State Champs. It was released on October 16, 2015 via Pure Noise Records.

== Background ==
On February 13, the State Champs began recording their next album. Recording lasted for 38 days. On March 27, it was announced that the group had finished recording.

== Release ==
In April and May 2015, the group supported All Time Low on their headlining US tour. They supported 5 Seconds of Summer on their headlining arena tour in Australia and New Zealand. On July 16, Around the World and Back was announced for release ion October., revealing its track listing and artwork. In addition, "Secrets" was made available for streaming. In July and August, the group embarked on a headlining US tour, dubbed The Shot Boys of Summer Tour. They were supported by Hit the Lights, Tiny Moving Parts, Let It Happen and Northbound. On August 9, "Losing Myself" was made available for streaming. On September 1, a music video was released for "All You Are Is History". On September 29, the title-track was made available for streaming. Around the World and Back was made available for streaming on October 12, before being released on October 16 through Pure Noise Records. In October and November, the group supported The Wonder Years on their headlining US tour.

In May 2016, the group supported A Day to Remember on their Just Some Shows tour in the US. In November and December, the group supported Sleeping with Sirens on their headlining US tour. On March 31, 2017, "Slow Burn" was made available for streaming. On April 19, the group released an acoustic version of "Secrets". In April and May, the group went on a headlining US tour with support from Against the Current, With Confidence and Don Broco. On May 5, the group released a deluxe edition of the album. It featured two acoustic versions of album tracks, two new songs, two live recordings and a DVD. It was promoted with "Slow Burn", an acoustic version of "Secrets" and "Hurry Up and Wait". The DVD was made available for streaming on November 2.

== Reception ==
Professional ratings
Aggregate scores
Source	Rating
Metacritic	83/100
Review scores
Source	Rating
AbsolutePunk	85/100
Alternative Press	Favorable
Exclaim!	8/10
Sputnikmusic	3.5/5
Substream Magazine	3.5/5 stars

The album has received generally positive reviews from critics. Most critics cite Derek Discanio's vocals, and the album's overall sound. The band's inclusion of orchestration on tracks, the album's title track which features Ansley Newman of Jule Vera, and the production are noted as highlights. The record has drawn multiple comparisons to the work of genre albums like New Found Glory, A Day to Remember, and All Time Low.

Writing for Alternative Press, Evan Lucy praised the growth the band has shown since their debut. Lucy went on to say, "a new level of nuance and polish (is shown) here thanks to songwriting skills that are certainly a few notches more developed than many bands (in) their senior."

Davery Boy of Sputnikmusic, also wrote a positive review. He commended the band's ability to write catchy hooks and gave particular praise to "All or Nothing" and its fusion of the band's pop-punk and alternative rock. Boy went on to write, "The quintet still perform pop punk better than many of their contemporaries...this LP sounds significantly more effective when played out loud, rather than through head or earphones....But it's difficult to ignore the feeling that they are capable of more."

Upon its release, the album peaked at number 30 on the US Billboard 200, and #3 on both the US Alternative and Top Rock Charts. Around the World and Back was nominated for Album Of The Year and "Secrets" was nominated for Song Of The Year at the 2016 Alternative Press Music Awards. The video for "Losing Myself" won the Music Video of the Year award at the 2017 Alternative Press Music Awards.

== Track listing ==
No.	Title	Length
1.	"Eyes Closed"	3:09
2.	"Secrets"	3:44
3.	"Losing Myself"	3:17
4.	"All You Are Is History"	3:02
5.	"Perfect Score"	3:18
6.	"All or Nothing"	3:39
7.	"Shape Up"	2:44
8.	"Back and Forth"	2:53
9.	"Around the World and Back"	3:50
10.	"Breaking Ground"	3:42
11.	"Tooth and Nail"	2:57

Deluxe edition bonus tracks
No.	Title	Length
12.	"Elevated" (live)	3:30
13.	"All You Are Is History" (live)	2:58
14.	"Losing Myself" (acoustic)	3:11
15.	"Secrets" (acoustic)	3:54
16.	"Hurry Up and Wait"	2:29
17.	"Slow Burn"	3:08

== Personnel ==
State Champs

- Derek DiScanio – lead vocals
- Tyler Szalkowski – lead guitar, backing vocals
- Ryan Scott Graham – bass guitar, backing vocals
- Tony "Rival" Diaz – rhythm guitar, backing vocals
- Evan Ambrosio – drums, percussion

Production

- Kyle Black – production, engineering, mixing
- Colin Schwanke – additional production, engineering
- Devon Corey – engineering
- Courtney Ballard – drum engineering
- Ted Jensen – mastering

== Charts ==
Chart (2015)	Peak position
Australian Albums (ARIA)	31
Scottish Albums (Official Charts)	79
UK Albums (Official Charts)	78
UK Independent Albums (Official Charts)	16
UK Rock & Metal Albums (Official Charts)	6
US Billboard 200	30
US Independent Albums (Billboard)	5
US Top Alternative Albums (Billboard)	3
US Top Rock Albums (Billboard)	3
