= Summer Bones =

Studio album by Hit the Lights
- Released: March 24, 2015
- Genre: Pop-punk
- Length: 26:34
- Label: Pure Noise
- Producer: Jay Wayman

Hit the Lights chronology
Invicta (2012)	Summer Bones (2015)	Just to Get Through to You (2016)

Professional ratings
Review scores
Source	Rating
AllMusic	3.5/5 stars
Alternative Press	4/5 stars
Rock Sound	8/10
AbsolutePunk	6/10
Ultimate Guitar	7.4/10

Summer Bones is the fourth full-length studio album from the American pop-punk band Hit the Lights, released on March 24, 2015. It was produced and mixed by Kyle Black (New Found Glory/All Time Low/State Champs). This is the band's first release on Pure Noise Records, as well as their shortest full-length album to date. The album's final track features guest vocals from original vocalist Colin Ross.

== Release history ==
In January 2015 Hit the Lights announced the title and release date for the album. A few days later, they premiered the first track off the album, "Fucked Up Kids," along with the track listing. Leading up to its release, the band premiered more songs including "The Real" and "No Filter" to build anticipation. The band announced on Twitter that they "wrote Invicta because we wanted to push ourselves. We wrote Summer Bones because we wanted to rip shit. We stand by both." Summer Bones premiered on the Glamour Kills website on March 18, 2015.

The music video for "Life on the Bottom" premiered on ESPN.com on April 9, 2015. In July and August, the group supported State Champs on the Shot Boys of Summer Tour with Tiny Moving Parts, Let It Happen, and Northbound. On March 9, 2016, a music video for "No Filter" was released on YouTube. The single has since been streamed over 3 million times. In October 2016, the group supported Simple Plan on their tour of Canada. In October and November, the group supported Good Charlotte on their headlining US tour.

Acoustic versions of "Blasphemy, Myself and I," "Fucked Up Kids," and "Summer Bones" were released on the band's 2016 EP Just to Get Through to You.

== Reception ==
The album was included at number 30 on Rock Sound's top 50 releases of 2015 list.

== Track listing ==
1. "Fucked Up Kids" – 2:31
2. "The Real" – 2:37
3. "Life on the Bottom" – 2:27
4. "Revolutions and Executions" – 3:05
5. "No Filter" – 2:54
6. "Blasphemy, Myself and I" – 2:40
7. "Summer Bones" – 3:45
8. "Keep Your Head – 1:29
9. "Sitter" – 2:25
10. "Old Friend" (Featuring Colin Ross) – 2:33

== Personnel ==
=== Hit The Lights ===
- Nick Thomoson – lead vocals
- Omar Zehary – guitar
- Kevin Mahoney – guitar
- David Bermosk – bass, backing vocals
- Nate Van Damme – percussion, drums

=== Other ===
- Colin Ross – guest vocals on "Old Friend"
- Kevin Ashba – organ and piano on "Summer Bones"
- Jay Wayman -producer, mixer, engineer
- Devin Corey – engineer
- Colin Shwankee – additional production
- Jacob Bautista – additional engineering
- Josh Barber – additional production on "The Real"
- Brad Blackwood – mastering
- Mark Metzger – artwork, layout

== Chart positions ==
Chart (2015)	Peak position
US Billboard Independent Albums	23
US Billboard Alternative Albums	24
US Billboard Rock Albums	36
