= Go Down in History =

EP by Four Year Strong
- Released: July 22, 2014
- Recorded: Early 2014
- Studio: The Machine Shop, New Jersey
- Genre: Pop punk
- Length: 16:36
- Label: Pure Noise
- Producer: Machine

Four Year Strong chronology
In Some Way, Shape, or Form (2011)	Go Down in History (2014)	Four Year Strong (2015)

Go Down in History is an EP by American rock band Four Year Strong. It features the first new material from the band since their 2011 album, In Some Way, Shape, or Form.

== Background ==
Four Year Strong released In Some Way, Shape, or Form (2011) through Republic Records-imprint Universal Motown. With the album, the group attempt to explore territory they thought their fans would enjoy; however, they received a negative reaction to it. Following this, the band were moved to Motown's parent label, away from the staff members that had signed them to the label. They eventually parted ways with the company and spent time with their respective families. Vocalist/guitarist Alan Day started the side project The Here and Now, bassist Joe Weiss operated a woodworking company, and vocalist/guitarist Dan O'Connor worked on his house.

They eventually reconvened for a writing session; all of the tracks evolved from jam sessions. They purposely focused on incorporating their live energy into the songs when writing. In March and April 2014, the group supported Bayside on their headlining US tour, dubbed The Great American Cult Tour. Following this stint, the band spent more time writing, before they planned to record anything. O'Connor said they had come up with more guitar riffs than they had for Enemy of the World (2010), though he was unsure if their next release was going to be an album or EP.

== Production and composition ==
Go Down in History was recorded at The Machine Shop in New Jersey with producer Machine. He engineered the sessions with Andy Gomoll and Alberto De Icaza; the latter pair also handled editing. They were assisted by Johnny Rieg throughout the sessions. Machine mixed the recordings with assistance from Icaza; mixing and mastered was also done at The Machine Shop.

Go Down in History saw the group move away from the arena rock experimentation of In Some Way, Shape, or Form, and back to the sound of their Rise or Die Trying (2007) and Enemy of the World (2010) albums: riff-centric pop punk with call-and-response vocals from Day and O'Connor. The EP featured the band playing at "turbocharged" tempos, with "intricate" guitar riffs; Revolver said the songs acted as a bridge between pop punk and melodic hardcore. "What's in the Box?" was the most reminiscent of the Rise or Die Trying era. The title-track incorporated gang vocals that recalled the closings tracks of both Rise or Die Trying and Enemy of the World. "So You're Saying There's a Chance" builds to a hook through a variety of time signature changes. Its title is a reference to the film Dumb and Dumber (1994).

== Release and reception ==
Professional ratings
Aggregate scores
Source	Rating
Metacritic	87/100
Review scores
Source	Rating
AbsolutePunk	85%
Alternative Press	4.5/5 stars
Ox-Fanzine	4/5 stars
Revolver	4/5
Rock Sound	8/10

=== Promotion and touring ===
On May 23, 2014 the band announced they had signed to Pure Noise Records. Though the band had talked to various labels, they met Pure Noise founder Jake Round through mutual friends. After hearing all of the positive things about Round and his label, the group signed with him. Four days later, Go Down in History was announced for release in July. Alongside this, the EP's artwork and track listing was revealed. On June 5, "Tread Lightly" was made available for streaming.

Between June and August, the band performed on the 2014 Warped Tour. On July 11, "Living Proof of a Stubborn Youth" premiered through AbsolutePunk. On July 18, a music video for "Go Down in History", filmed on the Warped Tour, premiered through Alternative Press' website. Go Down in History was released on July 22. In November, the group embarked on a headlining US tour, with support from Transit, Such Gold and Seaway. In January 2015, they went on another US headlining tour, this time with support from Comeback Kid, Expire, Handguns and Heart to Heart.

=== Critical response ===
Go Down in History received generally positive reviews from music critics, according to review aggregator Metacritic. The release marks a return to form for the band and reverts to their pop punk/melodic hardcore roots for the first time since their 2010 release Enemy of the World, the only difference being the lack of keyboards. The EP was included at number 34 on Rock Sound's "Top 50 Albums of the Year" list.

== Track listing ==
Track listing per booklet:

No.	Title	Length
1.	"What's in the Box?"	3:07
2.	"Living Proof of a Stubborn Youth"	3:05
3.	"Tread Lightly"	3:19
4.	"Go Down in History"	3:31
5.	"So You're Saying There's a Chance"	3:34
Total length:		16:36

== Personnel ==
Personnel per booklet.

Four Year Strong

- Alan Day – lead vocals, guitar
- Dan O'Connor – lead vocals, guitar
- Joe Weiss – bass guitar,
- Jake Massucco – drums

Production

- Machine – producer, mixing, engineer
- Andy Gomoll – engineer, editing
- Alberto De Icaza – editing, engineer, mix assistant
- Johnny Rieg – assistant
- Sam Kaufman – design
