= Living Proof (State Champs album) =

Studio album by State Champs
- Released: June 15, 2018
- Recorded: September–November 2017
- Genre: Pop punk
- Length: 41:57
- Label: Pure Noise
- Producer: Mike Green; Kyle Black; John Feldmann

State Champs chronology
Around the World and Back (2015)	Living Proof (2018)	Kings of the New Age (2022)

Singles from Living Proof
- 1. "Dead and Gone" Released: April 19, 2018; 2. "Crystal Ball" Released: May 6, 2018; 3. "Mine Is Gold" Released: May 25, 2018

Living Proof is the third studio album from American pop punk band State Champs. It is their last album to feature rhythm guitarist Tony Diaz before his departure in March 2020.

== Background and production ==
In August 2017, the band were reportedly going to work with All Time Low frontman Alex Gaskarth for their next album; they worked together on two songs for the reissue of Around the World and Back. Surrounding their appearance at Riot Fest, the band went on a tour of the US and Canada in September 2017. The following month, they announced they were collaborating with Mark Hoppus of Blink-182.

Mike Green and Kyle Black produced "Criminal", "Frozen", "Crystal Ball", "Lightning", "Safe Haven", "The Fix Up", "Cut Through the Static", and "Sidelines". Green and Black were assisted by engineers Colin Schwanke and Will McCoy, both of whom also did Pro Tools editing. John Feldmann produced "Dead and Gone", "Our Time to Go", "Something About You", "Mine Is Gold", and "Time Machine". Zakk Cervini, Jon Lundin, and Matt Pauling served as engineers, and did additional production; Black co-produced "Time Machine", and did additional engineering on "Dead and Gone", "Mine Is Gold", and "Time Machine". Black mixed all of the recordings, with assistance from Austin Linkous, before the album was mastered by Ted Jensen.

== Release ==
In March 2018, State Champs played at the Self Help Fest. On April 18, 2018, the band posted a teaser image online; the following day, Living Proof was announced for release in two months' time. Alongside this, "Dead and Gone" was made available for streaming, and its music video was posted online. On May 6, 2018, "Crystal Ball" premiered on BBC Radio 1's Rock Show, before it was made available for streaming. This was followed by "Mine Is Gold" on May 24, 2018. After appearing at the Galaxy Camp festival in Germany and Switzerland, they played some shows in mainland Europe with Knuckle Puck and Stand Atlantic, leading to a performance at the Slam Dunk Festival in the United Kingdom. A music video was released for "Our Time To Go" on June 11, 2018.

Following this, State Champs played on the Warped Tour touring festival between June and August 2018, and supported Blink-182 on their short US tour. After a brief stint of headlining shows, State Champs supported Fall Out Boy on their tour of the US. They then embarked on a European tour with Seaway in October and November 2018, with support from Woes and Stand Atlantic, before playing some shows in South America during the latter month. They ended the year with three holiday shows on the US West Coast, one of which supporting the Starting Line.

In March 2019, the band embarked on a headlining North American tour, with support from Our Last Night, the Dangerous Summer and Grayscale. In June 2019, bookending State Champs' appearance at the Download Festival in the UK, they went on a tour of Europe, before touring across the US in July and August 2018 as part of the Sad Summer Fest touring festival. In between dates of this, they played a few co-headlining shows with Mayday Parade, with support from Mom Jeans and Just Friends. In October and November 2019, State Champs went on a co-headlining US with Simple Plan, with support from We the Kings and Northbound. The trek was promoted with a collaborative song between State Champs, Simple Plan and We the Kings, titled "Where I Belong". They ended the year with a performance at the Snowed In festival in December 2019.

== Track listing ==
Track listing per booklet.

No.	Title	Producer	Length
1.	"Criminal"	Mike Green; Kyle Black	3:22
2.	"Frozen"	Green; Black	2:59
3.	"Crystal Ball"	Green; Black	3:12
4.	"Dead and Gone"	John Feldmann	3:11
5.	"Lightning"	Green; Black	2:56
6.	"Our Time to Go"	Feldmann	3:44
7.	"Safe Haven"	Green; Black	3:37
8.	"Something About You"	Feldmann	2:52
9.	"The Fix Up"	Green; Black	3:27
10.	"Cut Through the Static"	Green; Black	2:59
11.	"Mine Is Gold"	Feldmann	2:44
12.	"Time Machine" (featuring Mark Hoppus of blink-182)	Feldmann; Black (co.)	3:29
13.	"Sidelines"	Green; Black	3:25
Total length:			41:57

== Personnel ==
Personnel per booklet.

State Champs

- Derek DiScanio – lead vocals
- Tyler Szalkowski – guitar
- Ryan Scott Graham – bass
- Tony "Rival" Diaz – guitar
- Evan Ambrosio – drums

Additional musicians

- Henry Lunetta – additional guitar (track 4)
- Mark Hoppus – additional vocals (track 12)

Production

- Mike Green – producer (tracks 1–3, 5, 7, 9, 10 and 13)
- Kyle Black – producer (tracks 1–3, 5, 7, 9, 10 and 13), co-producer (track 12), additional engineering (tracks 4, 11 and 12), mixing
- John Feldmann – producer (tracks 4, 6, 8, 11 and 12)
- Colin Schwanke – assistant engineer (tracks 1–3, 5, 7, 9, 10 and 13), Pro Tools editing (tracks 1–3, 5, 7, 9, 10 and 13)
- Will McCoy – assistant engineer (tracks 1–3, 5, 7, 9, 10 and 13), Pro Tools editing (tracks 1–3, 5, 7, 9, 10 and 13)
- Austin Linkous – mixing assistance
- Zakk Cervini – engineer, additional production
- Jon Lundin – engineer, additional production
- Matt Pauling – engineer, additional production
- Ted Jensen – mastering

Design

- Dewey Saunders – artwork, collage
- Trey Hales – typography
- Ian Rees – layout
- Beth Saravo – photography

== Charts ==
Chart (2018)	Peak position
Australian Albums (ARIA)	62
Belgian Albums (Ultratop Flanders)	119
Scottish Albums (OCC)	54
UK Albums (OCC)	54
UK Album Downloads (OCC)	33
UK Independent Albums (OCC)	8
UK Rock & Metal Albums (OCC)	2
US Billboard 200	28
US Independent Albums (Billboard)	2
US Top Alternative Albums (Billboard)	3
US Top Rock Albums (Billboard)	4
