= Kings of the New Age =

Studio album by State Champs
- Released: May 13, 2022
- Genre: Pop punk
- Length: 35:03
- Label: Pure Noise
- Producer: Wzrd Bld

State Champs chronology
Living Proof (2018)	Kings of the New Age (2022)	State Champs (2024)

Singles from Kings of the New Age
- 1. "Just Sound" Released: August 25, 2021; 2. "Outta My Head" Released: September 8, 2021; 3. "Everybody But You" Released: February 23, 2022

Kings of the New Age is the fourth studio album from American pop punk band State Champs. The album was released on May 13, 2022 and marks the longest gap between albums for the band following the release of 2018's Living Proof. It is the band's first album without rhythm guitarist Tony Diaz after his departure in March 2020.

== Production ==
In an interview with Alternative Press, Derek DiScanio stated that production of the album had already started before the pandemic. While the band was in the stage of making writing trips to Los Angeles and making instrumental demos, they were introduced to Drew Fulk, who would end up becoming the producer and main engineer on the album. Derek praised Drew's attitude and work ethic, reflecting that the band had come up with over 30 song ideas and that Drew had helped enhance and combine them. Four of the tracks on the album feature collaborations with other artists, giving the album the most features out of any of the band's previous releases.

== Release ==
On February 23, 2022, the band announced that their fourth album would be titled "Kings of the New Age" and would be released on May 13, 2022. On the same day, they released the single "Everybody But You" featuring Ben Barlow from Neck Deep. The album's artwork and full track list was also revealed.

== Reception ==
Professional ratings
Review scores
Source	Rating
Kerrang!	4/5 stars
Substream Magazine	4.5/5 stars

In a review for Substream Magazine, Eric Riley reflected on band's growth over the past decade and complimented the choruses on the album, stating "The choruses are slick and stick on the first try". Jake Richardson from Kerrang! gave the album a four out of five and expressed that he felt the band was maintaining their sound but that the album had "the songs required to take them to the next level".

== Track listing ==
All tracks are written by Derek DiScanio, Drew Fulk, Evan Ambrosio, Ryan Scott Graham, and Tyler Szalkowski, with additional writers noted.

No.	Title	Writer(s)	Length
1.	"Here to Stay"		2:56
2.	"Eventually"		3:37
3.	"Everybody but You" (featuring Ben Barlow)	Anton DeLost	3:47
4.	"Outta My Head"		2:56
5.	"Fake it"	DeLost	3:02
6.	"Half Empty" (featuring Chrissy Costanza)		3:31
7.	"Just Sound"		3:22
8.	"Act Like That" (featuring Mitchell Tenpenny)	Courtney Ballard	3:03
9.	"Where Were You"		2:47
10.	"Sundress" (featuring Four Year Strong)	DeLost, Ryan Sweet	3:11
11.	"Some Minds Don't Change"		2:46
Total length:			35:03

== Personnel ==
State Champs

- Derek DiScanio – vocals
- Tyler Szalkowski – guitar
- Ryan Scott Graham – bass
- Evan Ambrosio – drums

Additional contributors

- Wzrd Bld – production
- Anton Delost – mixing, additional production, additional guitar, additional vocals
- Ted Jensen – mastering
- Kyle Black – drum engineering on all tracks except "Outta My Head"
- Seth Henderson – drum engineering on "Outta My Head"
- Courtney Ballard – co-production on "Just Sound"
- Donny Phillips – illustration, design
- Deville Nunes – cover photo
- Milan Chagoury – globe logo design
- Alex McDonnell – photography

== Charts ==
Chart (2022)	Peak position
UK Rock & Metal Albums (OCC)	11
US Independent Albums (Billboard)	33
US Top Album Sales (Billboard)	13
US Top Rock Albums (Billboard)	45
