= Brain Pain =

Studio album by Four Year Strong
- Released: February 28, 2020
- Studios: Graphic Nature Audio, Belleville, New Jersey
- Genres: Pop-punk, melodic hardcore
- Length: 42:04
- Label: Pure Noise
- Producers: Will Putney, Four Year Strong

Four Year Strong chronology
Four Year Strong (2015)	Brain Pain (2020)	Analysis Paralysis (2024)

Professional ratings
Review scores
Source	Rating
Dead Press!	9/10 stars
Exclaim!	8/10
Kerrang!	4/5
Ox-Fanzine	4/5 stars
Wall of Sound	4/5

Brain Pain is the seventh studio album by Massachusetts pop-punk band Four Year Strong, released on February 28, 2020. It was the band's first studio album in nearly five years. The album was announced on January 14, 2020, accompanied by the release of the first two singles from the album, "Talking Myself in Circles" and "Brain Pain".

== Background and recording ==
Vocalist/guitarist Alan Day spent time producing records for Can't Swim, Seaway and Knuckle Puck, and managing his Christmas tree farm. In January and February 2017, the group went on a UK tour to celebrate the 10th anniversary of Rise or Die Trying (2007). It was followed by two US legs: one in March and April 2017, and the other in September and October. A compilation album, Some of You Will Like This, Some of You Won't, appeared in September 2017.

Recording sessions for the band's next album were held at Graphic Nature Audio in Belleville, New Jersey with producer Will Putney. He also acted as engineer, with additional engineering from Steve Seid and additional editing from Geo Hewitt. Randy Slaugh and Guy Randle engineered the strings on "Be Good When I'm Gone". Putney mixed and mastered the recordings; the bonus tracks from the reissue were produced by the band and engineered, mixed and mastered by Day.

== Release ==
On January 14, 2020, Brain Pain was announced for release the following month. Alongside this, the album's artwork and track listing were revealed. In addition, "Talking Myself in Circles" and the title-track were made available for streaming. On February 11, a music video was released for "Learn to Love the Lie", directed by Miguel Barbosa. On February 27, a music video was released for "Get Out of My Head", directed by Barbosa and the band. The following day, Brain Pain was released through Pure Noise Records. Following this, the group supported Silverstein on their 20th anniversary tour. The trek was planned to continue into April, however, in mid-March the second half of shows were pushed back to July and August due to the COVID-19 pandemic.

== Track listing ==
Track listing per booklet.

Brain Pain track listing
No.	Title	Length
1.	"It's Cool"	3:23
2.	"Get Out of My Head"	3:10
3.	"Crazy Pills"	3:30
4.	"Talking Myself in Circles"	3:41
5.	"Learn to Love the Lie"	3:44
6.	"Brain Pain"	3:46
7.	"Mouth Full of Dirt"	3:15
8.	"Seventeen"	3:25
9.	"Be Good When I'm Gone"	3:20
10.	"The Worst Part About Me"	3:45
11.	"Usefully Useless"	2:59
12.	"Young at Heart"	4:06
Total length:		42:04

Deluxe edition bonus tracks
No.	Title	Length
13.	"MYVEK"	2:46
14.	"Pipe Dream"	2:34
15.	"Get Out of My Head (Acoustic)"	3:35
16.	"Talking Myself in Circles (Acoustic)"	3:39
17.	"Learn to Love the Lie (Acoustic)"	3:43
18.	"Seventeen (Remix)"	3:08
19.	"Bitter Sweet Symphony" (The Verve cover)	3:29
Total length:		64:58

== Personnel ==
Personnel per reissue booklet.

Four Year Strong

- Alan Day – vocals, guitars
- Dan O'Connor – vocals, guitars
- Jake Massucco – drums
- Joe Weiss – bass guitar

Additional musicians

- Emily Huntington – violin (track 9)
- Emily Rust – violin (track 9)
- Caryn Bradley – viola (track 9)
- Lisa Jackson – cello (track 9)

Production and design

- Will Putney – producer, engineer, mixing, mastering
- Steve Seid – additional engineering
- Geo Hewitt – additional editing
- Randy Slaugh – string arrangement engineer (track 9)
- Guy Randle – string engineer (track 9)
- Four Year Strong – producer (bonus tracks)
- Alan Day – engineer, mixing, mastering (bonus tracks)
- Don Phury – illustration
- Donny Phillips – art direction, design

== Charts ==
Sales chart performance for Brain Pain
Chart (2020)	Peak position
Scottish Albums (Official Charts)	93
US Billboard 200	175

== See also ==
- List of 2020 albums
