= Devon Kay & the Solutions =

American band

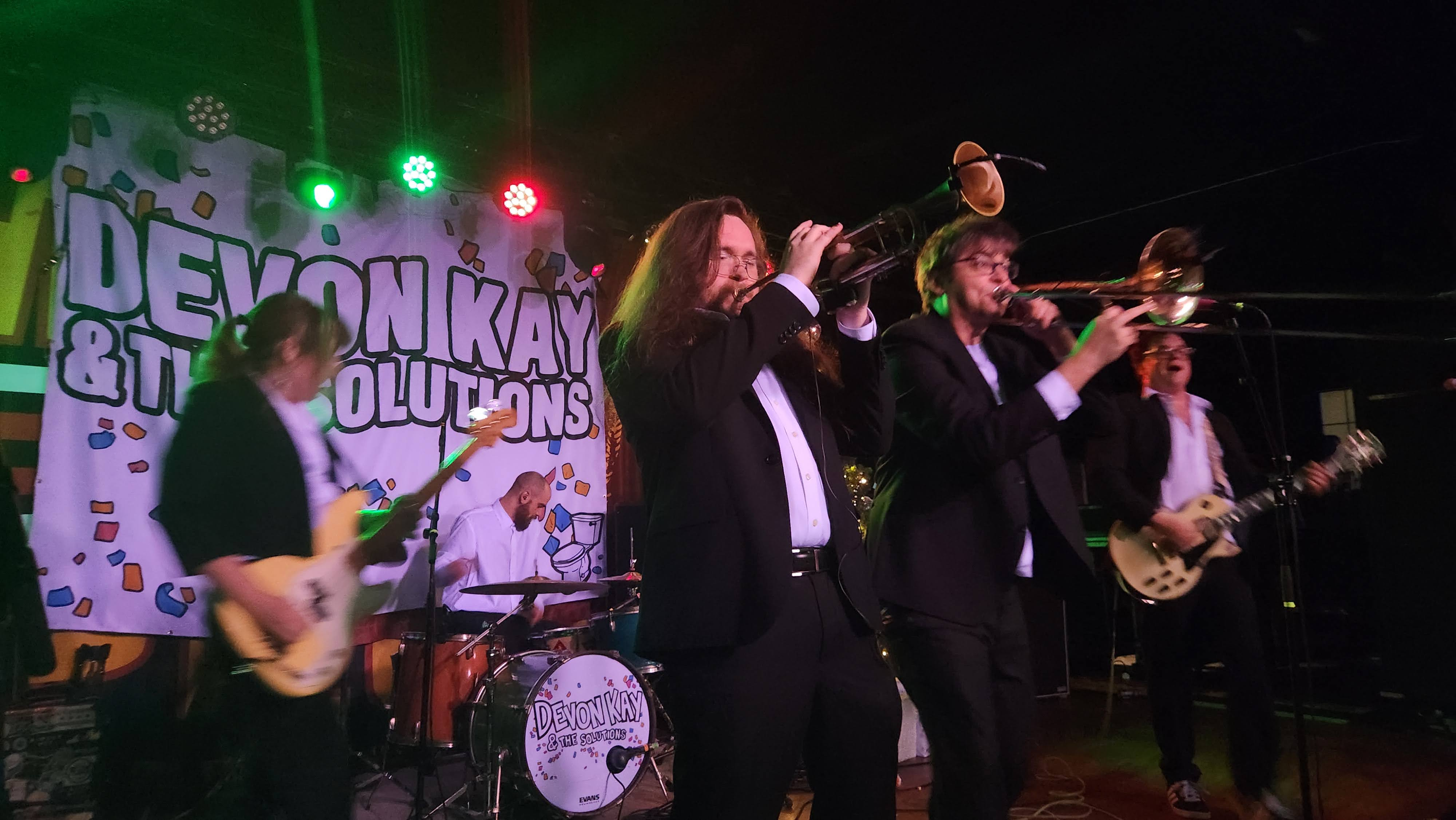
- Devon Kay and the Solutions perform at the Magic Stick in Detroit on December 26, 2025.

Background information
- Origin: Chicago, Illinois, U.S.
- Genres: Punk rock; indie rock; pop punk; ska punk; power pop
- Years active: 2011-present
- Labels: Pure Noise Records, Bad Time Records
- Members: Devon Kay; Jake Levinson; Jacob Horn; Ian Terry; Joram Zbichorski; Castle Trees
- Past members: Brian Toms; Ryan Scottie; Matt "Campy" Campasano; Heidi Gosen; Ryan Solava; Doug Yamate; Nicole Salvo; Cooper Link; Jerome Wade
- Website: devonkayandthe.solutions

Devon Kay & the Solutions are a ska punk and power pop band from Chicago. They have released 4 albums and 3 extended plays. Originally being a three-piece, they have since evolved to having a larger 7-piece band. They have toured with bands such as Dollar Signs, Less Than Jake, JER, and We Are The Union.

== History ==
Devon Kay, originally of Direct Hit!, started releasing music as Devon Kay & the Solutions as a trio in 2011, with the release Never Punt. After the follow-up release of Losing IT, the band took a break for a couple years before reuniting to make Yes, I Can't, the first release to feature Jacob Horn. Limited Joy further expanded the band, adding trumpet player Ian Terry and keyboard player Joram Zbichorski, establishing the modern line-up. In 2022, the band released Grieving Expectation on Pure Noise. After making ska-adjacent songs in the past, the band signed to Bad Time Records and released Fine: A Ska EP in 2023, comprising fully of ska songs. The band released & Knuckles, a two track video game EP consisting of a cover of "Still Alive" from Portal and "Escape from the City" from Sonic Adventure 2 in 2024. The band released their fifth studio album, World's Greatest Album, via Bad Time Records on October 9th, 2026.

== Discography ==
=== Studio albums ===
| Year | Title |
|---|---|
| 2013 | Losing IT |
| 2019 | Yes, I Can't |
| 2020 | Limited Joy |
| 2022 | Grieving Expectation |
| 2026 | World's Greatest Album |

=== Extended plays ===
| Year | Title |
|---|---|
| 2011 | Never Punt |
| 2023 | Fine: A Ska EP |
| 2024 | & Knuckles |

=== Live albums ===
| Year | Title |
|---|---|
| 2026 | "Underdubbed and Over the Top" An Evening with Devon Kay & the Solutions |
