= Contender (album) =

Studio album by Forever Came Calling
- Released: July 22, 2012
- Recorded: 2012
- Genre: Pop punk
- Length: 22:33
- Label: Pure Noise Records

Professional ratings
Review scores
Source	Rating
AbsolutePunk.net	8.5/10 stars
Alternative Press	3.5/5 stars

Contender is the debut studio album by American pop punk band Forever Came Calling. It was released on July 24, 2012, via Pure Noise Records.

== Track listing ==
No.	Title	Length
1.	"Learning"	0:55
2.	"For The Wolves"	1:09
3.	"Harbours"	2:10
4.	"The Office"	3:16
5.	"Ides"	2:37
6.	"If Bukowski Could See Me Now"	2:05
7.	"I'll Be Better I Promise"	3:24
8.	"Front Porch Sunrise"	3:05
9.	"Contender"	2:33
10.	"Dead Poets Honor"	2:39
Total length:		22:33
