= Skip School, Start Fights =

Studio album by Hit the Lights
- Released: July 8, 2008
- Studio: Pilot, New Jersey
- Genre: Pop-punk; easycore; neon pop punk; scene music
- Length: 40:36
- Label: Triple Crown
- Producer: Rob Freeman

Hit the Lights chronology
This Is a Stick Up... Don't Make It a Murder (2006)	Skip School, Start Fights (2008)	Coast to Coast (2009)

Singles from Skip School, Start Fights
- 1. "Stay Out" Released: June 24, 2008

Skip School, Start Fights is the second studio album from the American pop punk band Hit the Lights.

== Background and recording ==
On June 28, 2007, it was announced vocalist Colin Ross left the group. Ross explained he "decided [he] would like to take a different direction with [his] life and not live this lifestyle any longer." The band intended to continue and find a new vocalist. Subsequently, the band's guitarist Nick Thompson became their vocalist.

Demo versions of the songs "Drop the Girl," "Stay Out," and "Don't Wait" with Colin Ross' vocals leaked on the internet before the album's release.

The album was produced by Rob Freeman, with recording taking place at Pilot Studios in New Jersey. It was mixed by Zack Odom and Kenneth Mount. The album features guest vocals from Alex Gaskarth of All Time Low on the song "Don't Wait" and Shane Henderson of Valencia on the song "Drop the Girl."

== Music and lyrics ==
Stylistically, Skip School, Start Fights has been described as "an emotional roller coaster of pop punk and easycore," and contains what have been described as punk-influenced melodies and hardcore-influenced breakdowns. Musically, the album has been said to be more mature than its predecessor, though its lyrics have been described as "lighthearted." According to Marian Phillips of Alternative Press Magazine, the album "retains the youthful energy of the band’s original sound." Eric Schneider of AllMusic described the tracks as "boisterous" and "driving". Screen Rant said the album has "a shinier feel" than its predecessor.

== Release ==
Hit the Lights supported the Audition on their Spring Break '08 tour in the US from mid-March until early May. In April, the band appeared at the Bamboozle Left festival. Following this, they played a handful of Midwest and West Coast shows with Set Your Goals, I Am the Avalanche, 2*Sweet, and the Years Gone By, then a series of shows with I Am the Avalanche, Jet Lag Gemini, and the Armada until June 2008. On May 18, 2008, Skip School, Start Fights was announced for release in two months' time. On May 28, the band posted "Drop the Girl" on their MySpace profile. "Stay Out" was released as a single on June 24. Skip School, Start Fights was made available for streaming on July 1, before being released on July 8 through Triple Crown Records. Later in July, the band supported All Time Low on their headlining US tour. In September and October, the band supported Chiodos and Motion City Soundtrack on their co-headlining US tour. In October and November, the band supported Cobra Starship on their Sassy Back (Tour) in the US. In December, the band co-headlined a tour of the UK with Bayside. They were supported by Oh No Not Stereo. On December 17, the band's cover of Whitney Houston's "How Will I Know", which was previously only available as an iTunes bonus track, was posted on their MySpace.

On January 20, 2009, the music video for "Drop the Girl" premiered on MTV.com. The song has since been streamed over 8 million times. A few days later, the band performed at the Winter X Games. "Drop the Girl" then aired on MTV2's You Rock the Deuce on February 28. In March, the band supported the Maine and 3OH!3 on the Alternative Press Tour. Later that month, they performed at the Alternative Press party at South by Southwest festival. Between late June and late August, the band performed on the Vans Warped Tour.

A limited vinyl version (250 copies) of the album was released in November 2017 for Triple Crown Records' 20th anniversary.

"Drop the Girl" entered the top 10 on St. Louis, MO's Megarock Radio in July 2017. It peaked at #1 on March 20, 2019.

== Reception ==
Professional ratings
Review scores
Source	Rating
AllMusic	4/5 stars
Alternative Press	3.5/5 stars
AbsolutePunk	70%
Ultimate Guitar	7.4/10

Skip School, Start Fights received generally positive reviews from music critics. Jason Tate of AbsolutePunk said, "There will always be a soft spot in my heart for this genre when done right, and this is the kind of album that definitely gets it right. It's fun, energetic, and thoroughly enjoyable." Eric Schneider of AllMusic complimented Nick Thompson's vocals. "Previously the group’s backing vocalist/guitarist, Thompson eases into the spotlight quite well on this 13-song set, as revealed on the boisterous 'Stay Out' and driving 'Don’t Wait.'"

The album sold over 7,000 copies in its first week and debuted at number 97 on the Billboard 200 chart. By July 20, 2008, it sold over 10,000 copies.

Acoustic versions of "Tell Me Where You Are" and "Drop the Girl" were released on the band's Coast to Coast (2009) and Just to Get Through to You (2016) EPs.

== Track listing ==
1. "Count It!" - 1:02
2. "Breathe In" - 3:07
3. "Stay Out" - 3:47
4. "Drop the Girl" (featuring Shane Henderson from Valencia) - 3:21
5. "Tell Me Where You Are" - 4:02
6. "Hangs 'Em High" - 2:54
7. "Back Breaker" - 3:25
8. "Don't Wait" (featuring Alex Gaskarth from All Time Low) - 3:36
9. "Cry Your Eyes Out" - 3:07
10. "Statues" - 3:04
11. "Say What You Wanna Say" - 3:11
12. "Wide Awake" - 3:12
13. "On and On" - 2:56

iTunes bonus tracks

13. "How Will I Know" (Whitney Houston cover) – 3:54
14. "Drop the Girl" (Rowdy Boiz remix) – 3:12

== Charts ==
Chart (2008)	Peak position
US Billboard 200	97
US Digital Albums (Billboard)	24
US Independent Albums (Billboard)	11

== Personnel ==
=== Hit The Lights ===
- Nick Thompson - lead vocals
- Omar Zehary - guitar
- David Bermosk - bass, backing vocals
- Nate Van Damme - percussion, drums
