= Coast to Coast (Hit the Lights EP) =

EP by Hit the Lights
- Released: June 23, 2009
- Genres: Pop punk, easycore
- Label: Triple Crown
- Producers: Mark Trombino, John Feldmann

Hit the Lights chronology
Skip School, Start Fights (2008)	Coast to Coast (2009)	Invicta (2012)

Professional ratings
Review scores
Source	Rating
Alternative Press	3/5 stars

Coast to Coast is the third extended play (EP) by the American pop punk band Hit the Lights. The EP was released on June 23, 2009 and features two new songs, two cover songs, and two acoustic versions of existing Hit the Lights songs.

In 2009, Hit the Lights sold the EP as a CD during the Warped Tour and at subsequent shows.

== Track listing ==
All tracks are written by Hit the Lights, except where noted.

Coast To Coast
No.	Title	Length
1.	"Coast to Coast"	3:44
2.	"Pulse"	3:04
3.	"Drive Onto Me" (Elliott cover)	3:14
4.	"Snowbirds and Townies" (Further Seems Forever cover)	4:42
5.	"Tell Me Where You Are" (Acoustic feat. Lacey Steinel)	3:52
6.	"Make a Run for It / The Call Out" (Acoustic)	4:05
Total length:		22:38

== Charts ==
Chart (2009)	Peak position
US Heatseekers Albums (Billboard)	32

== Personnel ==
=== Hit The Lights ===
- Nick Thompson - lead vocals
- Omar Zehary - guitar
- Kevin Mahoney - guitar
- David Bermosk - bass, backing vocals
- Nate Van Damme - percussion, drums
