= Ben Quad =

American emo band

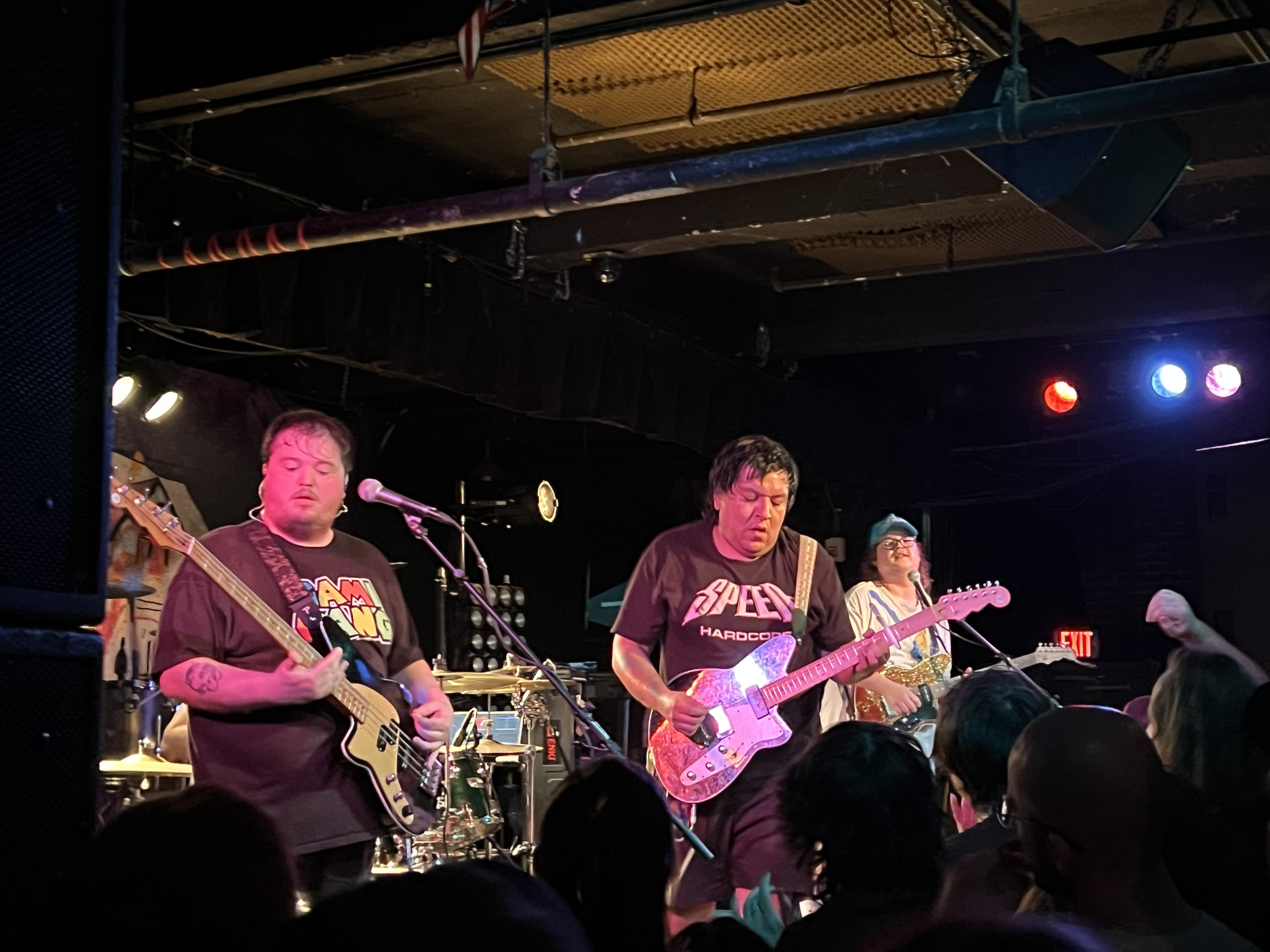
- Ben Quad performing at the Black Cat in Washington, D.C., on 19 April 2025

Background information
- Origin: Oklahoma City, U.S.
- Genres: Emo; pop-punk; post-hardcore; Midwest emo; screamo
- Years active: 2018–present
- Label: Pure Noise Records • Wax Bodega
- Members: Sam Wegrzynski; Henry Shields; Edgar Viveros; Isaac Young
- Website: benquad.com

Ben Quad is an American emo band from Oklahoma City. Formed in 2018, they released their debut album I'm Scared That's All There Is in 2022. On November 14, 2025, they released their second album, Wisher. The album's announcement was accompanied by the first single, "It's Just A Title". The band is named for Star Wars character Ben Quadinaros.

== Band members ==
- Sam Wegrzynski – vocals, guitar
- Henry Shields – vocals, bass
- Edgar Viveros – guitar
- Isaac Young – drums

== Discography ==
=== Studio albums ===
- I'm Scared That's All There Is (2022)
- Wisher (2025)

=== EPs ===
- Spring 2018 Demo: The Birth of Ben Quad (2018)
- Split (with My Heart & Liver Are the Best of Friends, 2018)
- Forever (with Brooding, 2019)
- Let's Split Up (with Sweet Peach, 2019)
- Ephemera (2024)
