= No Bragging Rights =

American melodic hardcore band

- Origin: Riverside, California, U.S.
- Genre: Melodic hardcore
- Years active: 1999–present
- Labels: Good Fight, BlkHeart, StandBy, Pure Noise
- Members: Mike Perez; Joshua Springer; Martin Alcedo; Anthony Laur
- Past members: Chris Williams "Handsome" Rick; Michael Portales; Ryan Sievers; Jose Mendoza; Anthony McCabe; Cody Henderson; Jamieson Stuart; Mike Dodrill; Jason Clay Martin; Christian Lee; Ryan Warrell; Daniel Garrow
- Website: www.facebook.com/nobraggingrightsofficial

No Bragging Rights is an American melodic hardcore band from Riverside, California, formed in 1999. Their notable albums include Illuminator and Cycles. Their album The Concrete Flower reached No. 2 in the Billboard Heatseekers Albums chart on October 11, 2014.

Their songs cover themes such as depression, abuse, and dealing with the real-life suicide of a friend of the band.

The band went on hiatus in 2015 following a road accident, but returned with a reintroduction album, No Bragging Rights, in 2021.

== History ==
=== Beginning (1999–2004) ===
No Bragging Rights was formed by vocalist Mike Perez, bassist Ryan Sievers and drummer Jose Mendoza when they were at the age of fifteen. They released several demo recordings between 2001 and 2004. These recordings include "Never Again Demo" (2001), "The Razor Apologies" EP (2002), and "Waking Angel Demo" (2004). Ryan Sievers, Jose Mendoza, Anthony McCabe, Cody Henderson, Jamieson Stuart, and Chris Williams have all been credited for taking part in recording said releases. After several lineup changes they decided to pursue a more melodic hardcore and punk influenced sound.

=== 2005–present ===
In 2005, Martin Alcedo and Christian Lee joined the band. The lineup was Mike Perez (vocals), Martin Alcedo (drums), Chris Williams (guitar), Christian Lee (bass), and Jason Martin (guitar). No Bragging Rights began writing their first full-length album titled "Because You Believe in Something Beyond Them" which was self-released in early 2006. This album was well received in the local music scene of Southern California and helped to establish the band outside of their hometown. Shortly after, "The Anatomy of a Martyr" EP was self-released in the summer of 2007, and brought No Bragging Rights to the national stage. This album was later re-released by Stand By Records.

Relentless "do it yourself" touring widened the band's fan base and attracted the attention of Pure Noise Records. 2008 Daniel Garrow joins the band mid tour. Garrow continues with the band and contributes in writing future albums. The label re-released "The Anatomy of a Martyr" in 2008, and debuted the full-length album "The Consequences of Dreams" in early 2009. That year No Bragging Rights played in the Taste of Chaos 2009 tour appearance at The House of Blues, in San Diego, California, with Bring Me the Horizon and several other bands.

The following year they released two singles titled "Passion Vs. Fashion" and "Unafraid to Burn". "Passion Vs. Fashion" was released on the compilation album "Vans 2010 Warped Tour Compilation." "Unafraid to Burn" was released on the "Atticus V" compilation album In January 2011, No Bragging Rights released a full length titled Illuminator through BlkHeart Group . They continue to tour the country, promoting their latest album, and have played with many big label bands such as Asking Alexandria, Emmure, and Carnifex.

On March 30, 2011, AMP posted an interview with Christian Lee and Handsome Rick.

On July 19, 2011, bassist Rick McDonald announced his departure from the group.

The band will be joined by fill-in bassist Ryan "Beard" Warrell (ex: To Something Beautiful, A Thorn for Every Heart etc.) for their upcoming Beautiful and Spineless Headline Tour and future dates until a permanent replacement is found.

In 2016 No Bragging Rights flip’s their van. They did Funeral For A Friend’s European headliner in January and supported Comeback Kid in March before going on a 5 year hiatus.

2021 No Bragging Rights returns to release a self titled EP. Warrell and Lee leave the band. Anthony “Tron” Laur joins the band. Tron records the self titled EP.

2023 Josh Springer joins the band on guitar.

2026 No Bragging Rights is expecting to release new music.

== Band members ==
=== Current Members ===
- Mike Perez – vocals (1999–present)
- Martin Alcedo – drums (2005–present)
- Anthony 'Tron' Laur – guitars (2021–present)
- Joshua Springer - guitars (2023-present)

=== Former members ===
- Chris Williams – guitar (2004–2008)
- Christian Lee – guitar (2005–2021)
- Ryan Sievers – bass (1999–2005)
- Jason Martin – bass (2005–2007)
- "Handsome" Rick – bass (2007–2011)
- Ryan Warrell – bass (2012–2021)
- Michael Portales - unknown (2004)
- Jose Mendoza - Drums (1999-2004)
- Daniel Garrow - guitar - (2008-2023)

== Discography ==
=== Albums ===
- Because You Believe in Something Beyond Them (2006)
- The Consequence of Dreams (2009)
- Illuminator (2011)
- Cycles (2012)
- The Concrete Flower (2014)
- No Bragging Rights (2021)

=== EPs ===
- "The Anatomy of a Martyr" (2007)
- "No Bragging Rights" (2021)

=== Singles ===
- "Passion Vs. Fashion" (2010)
- "Unafraid to Burn" (2010)

== Videography ==
- "Because You Believe in Something Beyond Them" (2006)
- "A Shot to End This All" (2009)
- "Unafraid To Burn" (2010)
- "Empire: Disarray" (2011)
- "Hope Theory" (2012)
- "Repeater" (2012)
- "Legacy" (2013)
- "Brave Hearts" (2015)
- "Outdated" (2015)
