= State Champs =

American pop-punk band

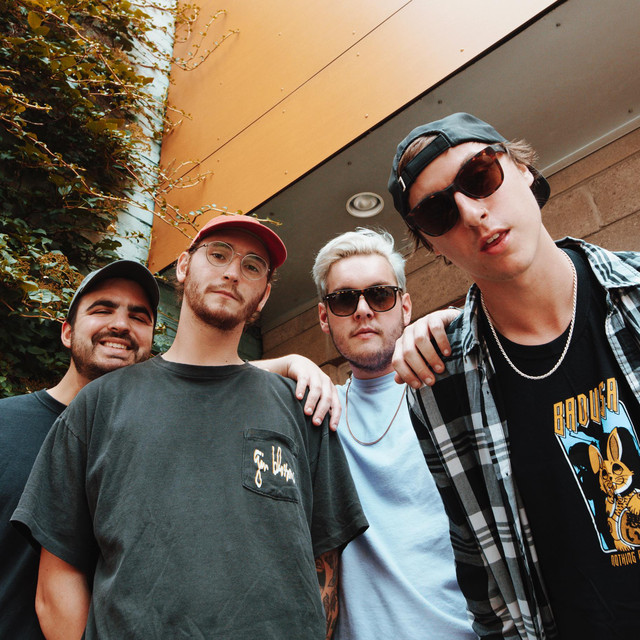
- State Champs in 2020. From left to right: Evan Ambrosio, Ryan Scott Graham, Tyler Szalkowski and Derek DiScanio

Background information
- Origin: Albany, New York, U.S.
- Genres: Pop-punk; emo pop
- Years active: 2010–present
- Label: Pure Noise
- Members: Derek DiScanio; Tyler Szalkowski; Ryan Scott Graham; Evan Ambrosio
- Past members: William Goodermote; Dave Fogarty; Matt Croteau; Tony Diaz
- Website: statechampsny.com

State Champs is an American pop-punk band from Albany, New York, formed in 2010. They are currently signed to Pure Noise Records and have released three EPs and five full-length albums. Their 2013 debut album The Finer Things debuted at number 2 on the Billboard Heatseekers Albums chart. They released an acoustic EP titled The Acoustic Things in October 2014 and their second studio album Around the World and Back one year later, in October 2015. In May 2017, they released a deluxe version of the album. Their third album, Living Proof, was released in 2018. In May 2022, the band released their fourth studio album, Kings of the New Age. In November 2024, their self-titled fifth album was released.

== History ==
=== Formation and early releases (2010–2012) ===
State Champs formed in the spring of 2010 in Albany, New York by founding members lead guitarist Tyler Szalkowski and lead singer Derek DiScanio. Shortly after forming, they put together a set of demos entitled "2010 EP". These songs were re-worked and re-recorded for the album, Apparently, I'm Nothing, released in Japan in April 2011. In July, the band toured with The Tired and True and Call It Fiction. In April 2012, interest in a demo of "Critical" helped the band gain a recording contract, a management company and a booking agency. On April 19, it was announced that the band signed to Pure Noise. In mid-June, the group recorded their next EP with Jay Maas at Getaway Recording Studio.

"Critical" was made available for streaming on July 12. In July and August, the band toured with With the Punches and Forever Came Calling, on The PropertyOfZack Tour. "Remedy" was made available for streaming on August 9. The band released the Overslept EP in September through Pure Noise. In September and October, the band supported Handguns, then supported Citizen the following month. The band toured alongside Hit the Lights, A Loss for Words and With the Punches in December. The group then supported Vanna on their holiday tour, dubbed Home for the Holidays, and toured with Handguns on their Pardon My Angst tour in March 2013.

=== The Finer Things and The Acoustic Things (2013–2015) ===
The band finished recording their debut full-length with producer Sam Pura at The Panda Studios and co-producer and former New Found Glory guitarist Steve Klein in Fremont, CA in May 2013. The group supported New Found Glory on their west coast tour in June, before supporting Cartel.

Their debut full-length album, The Finer Things, was released on October 8, 2013, and reached the Billboard 200. To support the album, the band supported Motion City Soundtrack and Bayside on a fall tour in North America. The band spent a majority of 2014 touring in support of the album, continuing to fill in support slots on tours around the US and Europe. On October 7, 2014, the band released an acoustic EP titled The Acoustic Things which featured acoustic versions of five tracks from The Finer Things as well as two new songs.

=== Around the World and Back (2015–2017) ===
The band opened for All Time Low on their Future Hearts tour in spring 2015, and then opened for 5 Seconds of Summer's Rock Out With Your Socks Out Tour in June 2015 in Australia and New Zealand. On July 15, the band announced their second album, Around the World and Back, would be released on October 16; by November, the album had reached number 30 on the US Billboard Top 200 albums chart. The band began a co-headlining world tour in the UK with Neck Deep in February 2016, with support from Creeper and Light Years. The tour continued in the US and Canada in February and March with support from Knuckle Puck and Like Pacific. Official music videos were produced for two of the album's singles, "All You Are Is History" and "Secrets".

While touring with Neck Deep in March, both bands also appeared on the cover of that month's issue of Alternative Press Magazine. After their co-headlining US tour, the band then supported A Day to Remember with Parkway Drive on the Just Some Shows tour in the US during the month of May 2016.

It was then announced that State Champs would once again be joining the 2016 Vans Warped Tour for the entire length of the tour, mainly playing on the Journeys Right Foot Stage. Post Warped Tour, State Champs made an appearance at an acoustic show with Sleeping with Sirens on August 25. The show took place at London's Union Chapel as a warm-up show prior to their appearance at the main stage at Reading and Leeds Festivals, in England. In addition to touring and festival appearances, the band also contributed to "Rock Sound Presents: The Black Parade", a compilation of My Chemical Romance covers released in September 2016, covering the song "The Sharpest Lives."

On March 21, 2017, the band released the single, "Slow Burn" and announced the release of a deluxe edition on Around the World and Back on May 5, with two new songs ("Slow Burn" and "Hurry Up and Wait"), two live songs ("All You Are Is History" and "Elevated") and two acoustic songs ("Secrets" and "Losing Myself"). Also announced was the release of a full-length DVD, directed by Elliot Ingham. Member Tony Diaz took a small break from the band the return to Viper City with Recon.

=== Living Proof and Unplugged EP (2017–2020) ===
Around late November 2017, Derek posted a picture on his Instagram with the caption "just finished recording vocals on the last song of the new record". Following this during early March 2018, State Champs posted what looked to be a set for a music video on their Instagram account. On April 11, 2018, the album artwork and track listing for Living Proof was leaked on various music websites. Later, on April 19, they released the lead single for the album, called "Dead and Gone", and announced that Living Proof would be released on June 15, 2018. On May 6, the band released the second single from the album, "Crystal Ball". On May 24, the group premiered the third single, "Mine Is Gold", on Billboard' s website. On June 15, the album was released. On March 26, 2020, the band announced that Tony Diaz would be stepping away from State Champs.

On June 23, 2020, the band announced a new acoustic ep entitled "Unplugged" and at the same time released the music videos for their new song "Crying Out Loud" and the acoustic version of their song "Criminal", followed by the next new song "10 Am" on July 22. The Ep, which came with four new songs and two acoustic re-imaginings of their songs "Criminal" and "Dead & Gone", was released on August 14, 2020.

=== Kings of the New Age (2021–2024) ===
In June 2021, the band announced that they’d be headlining the Pure Noise Records Tour, with support from Four Year Strong, Real Friends, Just Friends, and Bearings.

On August 25, 2021, the band released the single, "Just Sound", followed by "Outta My Head" on September 8 and a cover of Fall Out Boy's "Chicago is So Two Years Ago" on September 21. On February 23, 2022, following the release of their third single, "Everybody But You", the band announced that their new album, Kings of the New Age, would be released on May 13 via Pure Noise Records. On April 13, 2022, the band released the fourth single, "Eventually." Months later, they announced they would be going on a nationwide tour with Blackbear.

In late 2022, the band embarked on a national headline tour featuring Hunny and Between You & Me, as well as Young Culture, Games We Play, and Save Face on select dates. They would go on to support Boys Like Girls the following year.

=== Self-titled fifth studio album (2024-present) ===
In March 2024, State Champs began posting photos and videos from ongoing studio sessions to social media. They also confirmed that a fifth studio album was in the works. On August 20, the band released the first two singles, "Silver Cloud" and "Too Late to Say", for their upcoming self-titled album. On September 19 they released their next single entitled "Light Blue". Their album State Champs was released on November 8 via Pure Noise Records.

The band are confirmed to be making an appearance at Welcome to Rockville, which will take place in Daytona Beach, Florida in May 2026.

== Style and influences ==
State Champs' style has been described as pop-punk. Their influences include The Starting Line, All Time Low, Blink-182, Sum 41, Fall Out Boy, and Green Day.

== Accolades ==
Around the World and Back was ranked at number 4 in Alternative Press's "10 Essential Records of 2015" list. Mackenzie Hall of Alternative Press wrote that the band brought "everything you love about old-school pop punk with new-school heart." The album was included at number 8 on Rock Sound's top 50 releases of 2015 list. "If I'm Lucky" was nominated for Best Music Video and "Secrets" was nominated for Song Of The Year at the 2016 Alternative Press Music Awards. State Champs won Best Breakthrough Band at the 2016 Alternative Press Music Awards. "Losing Myself" won the award for Best Music Video at the 2017 Alternative Press Music Awards.

== Band members ==
Current

- Derek DiScanio – lead vocals (2010–present)
- Tyler Szalkowski – lead guitar, backing vocals (2010–present), rhythm guitar (2020–present)
- Ryan Scott Graham – bass, backing vocals (2014–present)
- Evan Ambrosio – drums, percussion (2012–present)

Touring

- Cameron Hurley – rhythm and lead guitar (2021–2022)

Former

- Dave Fogarty – rhythm guitar (2010–2011)
- Matt Croteau – drums (2010–2012)
- William Goodermote – bass (2010–2013)
- Tony "Rival" Diaz – rhythm guitar, backing vocals (2012–2020)

Timeline

== Discography ==
=== Albums ===
Title	Album details	Peak chart positions						Sales
Title	Album details	US	US Rock	US Indie	US Alt	AUS	UK	Sales
The Finer Things	Released: October 8, 2013; Label: Pure Noise; Format: CD, CS, DL, LP	132	43	24	—	—	—	US: 24,000
Around the World and Back	Released: October 16, 2015; Label: Pure Noise; Format: CD, CS, DL, LP	30	3	5	3	31	78	
Living Proof	Released: June 15, 2018; Label: Pure Noise; Format: CD, DL, LP	28	4	2	3	62	54	
Kings of the New Age	Released: May 13, 2022; Label: Pure Noise; Format: CD, DL, LP	—	45	33	—	—	—	
State Champs	Released: November 8, 2024; Label: Pure Noise; Format: CD, DL, LP	—	—	—	—	—	—	
"—" denotes releases that did not chart

=== Extended plays ===
- EP 2010 (self-released, 2010)
- Apparently, I'm Nothing (self-released, 2011)
- Overslept (Pure Noise, 2012)
- The Acoustic Things (Pure Noise, 2014) US No. 112
- Unplugged (Pure Noise, 2020)

=== Compilation appearances ===
- Punk Goes Pop Vol. 6 (2014) – "Stay the Night" originally performed by Zedd featuring Hayley Williams of Paramore
- Rock Sound Presents: The Black Parade (2016) – "The Sharpest Lives" originally performed by My Chemical Romance
- Punk Goes Pop Vol. 7 (2017) – "Stitches" originally performed by Shawn Mendes
- Songs That Saved My Life Vol. 2 (2019) – "Real World" originally performed by Matchbox Twenty
- Dead Formats, Vol. 1 (2022) - "What's My Age Again?" originally performed by blink-182
