= This Is a Stick Up... Don't Make It a Murder =

Studio album by Hit the Lights
- Released: April 11, 2006
- Studio: SOMD (Beltsville, Maryland)
- Genre: Pop-punk
- Length: 47:17
- Label: Triple Crown
- Producer: Matt Squire

Hit the Lights chronology
Until We Get Caught (2005)	This Is a Stick Up... Don't Make It a Murder (2006)	Skip School, Start Fights (2008)

This Is a Stick Up... Don't Make It a Murder is the first full-length album from Hit the Lights.

== Music ==
Screen Rant characterized the album by its "choppy, chugging guitar work and peppy spirit".

== Release ==
In November 2005, the band supported Hot Rod Circuit on their headlining US tour. For the first half of February 2006, they wet on tour with the Spill Canvas. From late February to late March 2006, the band supported A Thorn for Every Heart on their US tour, leading to an appearance at the South by Southwest music conference. The band went on the 2006 edition of the Take Action Tour in early-to-mid April. This Is a Stick Up... Don't Make It a Murder was released on April 11, 2006, on Triple Crown Records. In April and May, the band went on tour with I Am the Avalanche, The Receiving End of Sirens and As Tall as Lions. From late May to early June, the band supported Bayside on their Lions Tigers and Bears Tour. Following this, they appeared at The Bamboozle festival, and went on the Warped Tour. In August and September, the band supported Paramore on their tour of the U.S. Following this, they appeared at the Bamboozle Left festival. In March and April 2007, the band headlined the Let It Ride Tour, alongside Valencia, Just Surrender, the Secret Handshake, All Time Low, Love Arcade and Forgive Durden. Following this, they appeared at The Bamboozle festival. On June 28, it was announced that vocalist Colin Ross had left the group. Ross explained that he "decided I would like to take a different direction with my life and not live this lifestyle any longer." Subsequently, guitarist Nick Thompson became their vocalist.

== Reception ==
Professional ratings
Review scores
Source	Rating
AbsolutePunk.net	(75%)
Allmusic	3.5/5 stars

By July 2006, the album sold over 13,000 copies, and by January 2007, 30,000 copies had been sold.

The album was included at number 37 on Rock Sound's "The 51 Most Essential Pop Punk Albums of All Time" list.

Screen Rant said "Body Bag" was "one of the best pop-punk songs ever written [...] Any pop-punk night there's ever been has played this bouncy and catchy tune that is so good that it sets a bar that Hit The Lights never managed to meet again."

== Track listing ==
No.	Title	Length
1.	"The Call Out (You Are the Dishes)"	2:53
2.	"These Backs Are Made for Stabbing"	3:48
3.	"Three Oh Nine"	2:58
4.	"Body Bag"	3:09
5.	"Talk Us Down"	3:09
6.	"Save Your Breath"	2:38
7.	"Sincerely Yours"	3:15
8.	"One Hundred Times"	3:41
9.	"It's All the Rage"	2:53
10.	"Speakers Blown"	3:35
11.	"Until We Get Caught"	2:50
12.	"Make a Run for It" (includes hidden track "Her Eyes Say Yes, But The Restraining Order Says No")	12:25

iTunes Store bonus track
No.	Title	Length
13.	"Acoustic"	3:45
14.	"Stick Up"	4:01

Notes

- All songs are written by Hit the Lights
- The track "Until We Get Caught" was featured on the video game Madden NFL 07, with the album title shortened to This Is a Stick Up….
- There is an acoustic hidden track, at 8:42 on "Make a Run for It". On iTunes, the hidden track is released separately as "Acoustic", and "Make a Run for It" is only 4:11 long.

== Personnel ==
=== Hit The Lights ===
- Colin Ross - vocals
- Nick Thompson - guitar, vocals
- Omar Zehary - guitar
- David Bermosk - electric bass, vocals
- Nathan Van Damme - drums, percussion
