= Invicta (Hit the Lights album) =

Studio album by Hit the Lights
- Released: January 31, 2012
- Genre: Pop-punk; indie rock; alternative rock
- Length: 37:57
- Label: Razor & Tie; Sony Music; 3Wise Records
- Producer: Mike Sapone

Hit the Lights chronology
Coast to Coast (2009)	Invicta (2012)	Summer Bones (2015)

Singles from Invicta
- 1. "Gravity"; 2. "Earthquake"

Professional ratings
Review scores
Source	Rating
AllMusic	3.5/5 stars
Absolute Punk	7.5/10
Melodic	4/5 stars
PopMatters	5/10
Rock Sound	6/10

Invicta is the third full-length studio album from the American pop punk band Hit the Lights. It was released on January 31, 2012 through Razor & Tie records in North America and on February 24, 2012 through 3Wise Records in Australia. The entire album was produced by Mike Sapone who had produced Taking Back Sunday, Brand New. The songs "Gravity", "Earthquake" and "All the Weight" are taken from their previous EP "Invicta EP". In June, the group appeared on the Journeys Backyard BBQ Tour, which included indoor and outdoor performances at malls in the US.

The album debuted at number 129 on the Billboard 200, selling over 4,000 copies in its first week.

== Critical reception ==
Invicta received mixed to positive reviews from music critics. Jason Lymangrover of AllMusic gave the album 3.5/5 stars, said "the songs are so sonically powerful that they seem, well, epic. As it stands, Invicta is Hit the Lights' ultimate bid for mainstream acceptance and also the quintet's strongest album to date". Andy Ritchie of Rock Sound gave the album a 6/10 rating, said "the album marks the return of one of the most understated but best-loved pop-punk behemoths of the last five years, although it sadly doesn’t quite deliver on its promise".

== Track listing ==
No.	Title	Length
1.	"Invincible"	3:15
2.	"Gravity"	2:52
3.	"Earthquake"	3:19
4.	"So Guilty"	3:28
5.	"Get to You"	3:21
6.	"Float Through Me"	3:32
7.	"Should've Known"	3:39
8.	"All the Weight"	3:31
9.	"Faster Now"	3:52
10.	"Take Control"	3:10
11.	"Oh My God"	3:52
Total length:		37:57

Australian Bonus Track
No.	Title	Length
12.	"Liars and Cheats"	3:22
Total length:		41:19

Japanese Bonus Track
No.	Title	Length
12.	"Let You Down"	2:48

Notes

- The song "Faster Now" is co-written with Ryan Key of Yellowcard.
- Original version of the three songs from "Invicta EP" were produced by Machine.

== Personnel ==
=== Hit The Lights ===
- Nick Thomoson – lead vocals
- Omar Zehary – guitar
- Kevin Mahoney – guitar
- David Bermosk – bass, backing vocals
- Nate Van Damme – percussion, drums

Production

- Mike Sapone – production, mixing
- Paul Leavitt – mastering
- Guy Benny – engineer
- Claudius Mittendorfer – engineer
- Will Putney – engineer
- Alberto Declcaza – assistant engineer, mixing assistant

== Chart positions ==
Chart (2011)	Peak position
US Billboard 200	129
US Billboard Rock Albums	30
