= The Finer Things (State Champs album) =

Studio album by State Champs
- Released: October 8, 2013
- Recorded: April 9–May 9, 2013; The Panda Studios in Fremont, California
- Genre: Pop-punk
- Length: 34:34
- Label: Pure Noise
- Producer: Sam Pura, Steve Klein

State Champs chronology
Overslept (2012)	The Finer Things (2013)	Around the World and Back (2015)

The Finer Things is the debut studio album by American pop-punk band State Champs.

== Background and production ==
State Champs formed in Albany, New York in 2010. The band consist of Derek Discanio on vocals, Tyler Szalkowski and Tony Diaz on guitar, William Goodermote on bass and Evan Ambrosio on drums. The band released EP 2010 in August, which was quickly followed up with the Apparently, I'm Nothing EP in January 2011. In April 2012, interest in a demo of "Critical" helped the band gain a recording contract, a management company and a booking agency. On April 19, it was announced that the band signed to Pure Noise. In addition, it was mentioned that group would release another EP during summer, with their debut album expected for later in the year. The band subsequently released the Overslept EP in September.

On April 9, 2013, it was announced the band had started recording their debut album with producer Sam Pura and co-producer and former New Found Glory guitarist Steve Klein at The Panda Studios in Fremont, California in May 2013. Exactly a month later, it was announced the band had finished recording. All of the songs that were to feature on their debut album were written in Discanio's bedroom.

== Music ==
The album has been described as pop-punk. Derek Discanio said: “It's just a very straight, heartfelt, fun, catchy pop-punk album. We really didn't overthink it. We had no idea what we were doing, really, and we had no expectations for it. We just wanted to present ourselves to the world as the people we were, and I think we did that.”

== Release ==
On July 31, 2013, The Finer Things was announced for release, with its track listing and artwork being revealed. On August 20, a music video was released for "Elevated". It was filmed at Warped Tour and directed by Rob Soucy. The band supported Hit the Lights on their tour of Australia in September. In September and October, the group supported Bayside and Motion City Soundtrack on their co-headlining US tour. On September 17, "Nothing's Wrong" was made available for streaming. On September 26, "Easy Enough" was made available for streaming. On September 29, a music video was released for "Hard to Please", after premiering on MTVu. On October 2, The Finer Things was made available for streaming, and was released on October 8 through Pure Noise.

In November, the band supported Chunk! No, Captain Chunk! on The Truffle Shuffle Tour in the US. Between February and April 2014, the band supported We Are the In Crowd; the following month, the band supported The Wonder Years on their tour of the UK and Europe. The band then went on the 2014 edition of Warped Tour. In September, the group went on a co-headlining Australian tour with Neck Deep. They were supported by Sidelines. In October, the band released The Acoustic Things EP through Pure Noise. The EP features acoustic versions of several songs from The Finer Things. In October and November, the band co-headlined the Pure Noise Records Tour with Handguns. They were supported by Forever Came Calling, Front Porch Step, Heart To Heart and Brigades. In November, the group supported New Found Glory on their Pop Punk's Not Dead tour in the UK.

== Reception ==
Professional ratings
Aggregate scores
Source	Rating
Metacritic	90/100
Review scores
Source	Rating
AbsolutePunk	8/10
Alternative Press	4/5 stars
Punknews.org	3/5 stars
Rock Sound	9/10

The album charted at number 132 on the U.S. Billboard 200 chart and at number 2 on the Heatseekers Albums chart. It has sold 24,000 copies in the United States as of September 2015.

The Finer Things was included on Rock Sound's "50 Best Albums of 2013" list at number 14. Rock Sound also considered it one of the best pop-punk albums of the 2010s decade. The album was included at number 43 on Rock Sound's "The 51 Most Essential Pop Punk Albums of All Time" list. Cleveland.com ranked "Elevated" at number 78 on their list of the top 100 pop-punk songs.

== Track listing ==
1. "Elevated" – 3:29
2. "Deadly Conversation" – 3:08
3. "Hard to Please" – 3:03
4. "Prepare to Be Noticed" – 3:07
5. "Over the Line" – 3:24
6. "Simple Existence" – 3:45
7. "Remedy" – 3:24
8. "Nothing's Wrong" – 3:18
9. "Mind Bottled" – 2:54
10. "Critical" – 3:23
11. "Easy Enough" – 2:59

== Chart performance ==
Chart (2013)	Peak position
US Billboard 200	132
US Billboard Heatseekers Albums	2

== Personnel ==
- Derek Discanio - lead vocals
- Tyler Szalkowski - lead guitar, backing vocals
- Tony Diaz - rhythm guitar, backing vocals
- William Goodermote - bass
- Evan Ambrosio - drums, percussion
- Sam Pura - producer, engineer, mixing, guitar, bass
- Brian "Big Bass" Gardner - mastering
