= Hit the Lights =

American pop punk band

- Hit the Lights performing at the Glasgow Carling Academy, 2006

Background information
- Origin: Lima, Ohio, United States
- Genres: Pop punk; easycore
- Years active: 2003–present
- Labels: Silent Movie; Triple Crown; Universal Republic; Razor & Tie; Pure Noise
- Members: Nick Thompson; Omar Zehery; Kevin Mahoney; Nate Van Damme; David Bermosk
- Past members: Ryan Radebaugh; Colin Ross; Kyle Maite

Hit the Lights is an American pop punk band from Lima, Ohio. It is named in allusion to the '80s skateboarding film, Gleaming the Cube, and has sold over 120,000 albums in North America.

In 2025, Terry Bezer of Screen Rant included the band in his list of "10 Forgotten Pop-Punk Bands Who Deserve To Be Better Remembered".

== History ==
=== Formation and Until We Get Caught EP (2003–2005) ===
Hit the Lights formed in 2003. During the band's documentary "Vultures Don't Eat Vans," the band dispelled rumors that their name was taken from a Metallica song. Band members Colin Ross and Omar Zehery first played in a local band The Goodbye Session. Nick Thompson originally was in a group called The Summer Departure and Nate Van Damme had worked for Hawthorne Heights as a drum tech and played for Glasseater. The band released their first EP, Leaving Town Tonight, in 2004. In March 2005, Hit the Lights recorded and released the EP Until We Get Caught on Silent Movie Records. The band signed to Triple Crown Records which reissued Until We Get Caught in November 2005.

=== This Is a Stick Up... Don't Make It a Murder (2006–2007) ===
Hit the Lights headlined the Let It Ride Tour in 2007 which featured support from Just Surrender, All Time Low, Valencia, Forgive Durden, The Secret Handshake, and Love Arcade. Lead singer Colin Ross stated that he could no longer be a part of the band because his heart just was not in it. The other members said they noticed that Ross did not seem to be as into performing and being part of the band the better part of the last year. They were slated to embark on a headlining tour in the United Kingdom in October 2007, but had to cancel due to not being able to find a permanent lead vocalist after Colin Ross left in June 2007. Colin performed his last show with the band on September 15, 2007, at The Axis in Lima, Ohio. After that show, the remaining four members went into recording and recorded a cover, "The Warrior", with Nick Thompson on lead vocals.

=== Skip School Start Fights and Coast to Coast EP (2008–2009) ===
The band posted a new demo entitled "Stay Out", on January 31, 2008. Notably, their first single without former lead vocalist Colin Ross. On February 19, 2008, they announced that guitarist/backing vocalist Nick Thompson was taking over the lead vocalist role for the band. On July 8, 2008, Hit the Lights released their second full-length titled Skip School, Start Fights. The band shot a music video for the song "Stay Out" in the San Francisco Bay Area on May 27, 2008. The band shot a music video for single "Drop The Girl" on October 6, 2008, in Van Nuys, California. The video includes Glee star Heather Morris in a small role. On June 23, 2009, Hit the lights released Coast to Coast which featured 2 new songs, 2 cover songs, and two acoustic tracks. The band embarked on the 2009 Warped Tour. At Cincinnati stop of the Warped Tour, former vocalist Colin Ross joined Hit the Lights on stage for the song "Bodybag". Hit The Lights embarked on a headlining tour in late 2009, called the Manotour, with opening acts There For Tomorrow, Fireworks, Sparks The Rescue, This Time Next Year, Vinnie Caruana, and Oh No Not Stereo.

=== Signing with Universal Republic and Invicta EP and Invicta (2010–2012) ===
In April 2010 Hit The Lights toured Australia with New Found Glory and Fireworks. Hit the Lights had fulfilled their contract obligations with Triple Crown Records and began looking for a new label. After a bidding war in March 2010, they announced that they had signed with Universal Republic Records, in partnership with Vagrant Records. Hit the Lights worked to write their major label debut, but became increasingly frustrated from the lack of feedback and the desire from the label for them to write Top 40 Radio hits. During this time, Universal Republic experienced significant restructuring and in May 2011 Hit the Lights asked for release from their contract, which was granted. On June 1, 2011, Hit the Lights entered the studio to begin recording their new record. Guitarist Omar has said that they have collaborated with Ryan Key from Yellowcard, Tim Pagnotta from Sugarcult, and Kenny Vasoli from The Starting Line. In September 2011, the band signed with Razor & Tie Records.

On November 1, 2011, Hit the Lights released the 3-track Invicta EP which featured three new songs that would appear on their third full-length album.

On January 31, 2012, Hit the Lights released their third studio album, Invicta.

Former singer Colin Ross joined the band in December 2012 for their east coast tour and the Glamour Kills Holiday Festival.

=== Summer Bones (2013–2015) ===
Hit the Lights headlined the Glamour Kills holiday show in New York City on January 11, 2014. They played Skip School, Start Fights in full with support from Handguns, State Champs, Misser, and Elder Brother.

The band signed to Pure Noise Records on April 14, 2014.

On August 21, 2014, Hit the Lights finished recording their fourth studio album with producer Kyle Black. Summer Bones was announced on January 12, 2015, and released on March 24, 2015.

The band played select dates of Motion City Soundtrack's Commit This to Memory anniversary tour in January 2015. The band also supported Cartel on the Chroma anniversary tour in April. After that, they supported Chunk! No, Captain Chunk! on the Get Lost, Find Yourself tour in May.

=== Just to Get Through to You EP, fifth studio album and Kyle Maite's death (2016–present) ===
Hit the Lights co-headlined the Pure Noise Records Tour with Seaway in April and May 2016 with Can't Swim and Casey Bolles as support. Boston Manor were set to play the tour, too, but had to cancel due to visa issues. The acoustic EP Just to Get Through to You was released on May 6, 2016.

On September 23, 2022, the band announced guitarist Kyle Maite died on September 20 in a truck accident. The band played a benefit concert for Maite at the Ace of Cups in Columbus, OH on February 18, 2023, with surprise appearances by original guitar player Omar Zehery and original vocalist Colin Ross.

== Musical style ==
AllMusic categorized Hit the Lights' music as "emo-tinged punk-pop," as well as "emocore". Chris Fallon of AbsolutePunk characterized the band's style as "bring[ing] immediacy to an ADD audience who refuses to wait for that tasty ice cream treat to melt and is willing to take the brain freeze."

== Side projects ==
Vocalist Nick Thompson is currently involved in his side project, Thief Club. Many of his tracks are written of a more personal nature to Thompson as well as some unfinished Hit the Lights tracks. Thief Club's first album, My Heavy, was released on December 25, 2013, in Japan and on February 4, 2014, in the United States.

Drummer Nate Van Damme and guitarist/vocalist Kevin Mahoney have started a hardcore project named Holy War.

Guitarist Omar Zehery owns and manages a recording studio, Legacy Sounds Studio, and a record label, Rustgaze Records, based in Lima, Ohio.

== Members ==
Current members
- Nick Thompson – lead vocals (2007–present); guitar, backing vocals (2003–2007)
- Kevin Mahoney – guitar, backing vocals (2008–present)
- Dave Bermosk – bass, backing vocals (2003–present)
- Nate Van Damme – drums (2005–present)
- Omar Zehery – guitar, backing vocals (2003–2016, 2023–present); lead guitar (2007)
Former members
- Ryan Radebaugh – drums, percussion (2003–2005)
- Colin Ross – lead vocals (2003–2007, guest appearance on last track of the band's album Summer Bones)
- Kyle Maite – guitar (2016–2022; his death)

Timeline

== Discography ==
=== Studio albums ===
| Year | Album | Chart positions | | |
| Year | Album | Top 200 | US Indie | US Heat |
|---|---|---|---|---|
| 2006 | This Is a Stick Up... Don't Make It a Murder: Released: April 11, 2006; Label: Triple Crown | – | – | 41 |
| 2008 | Skip School, Start Fights: Released: July 8, 2008; Label: Triple Crown | 97 | 11 | – |
| 2012 | Invicta: Released: January 31, 2012; Label: Razor & Tie / Sony | 129 | – | – |
| 2015 | Summer Bones: Released: March 24, 2015; Label: Pure Noise Records | – | 23 | – |

=== EPs ===
- Leaving Town Tonight (2004)
- Until We Get Caught (2005)
- Coast to Coast (2009)
- Invicta EP (2011)
- Just to Get Through to You (2016)
- Tomorrow's Gonna Hurt (2025)

=== Singles ===
- "Anthem" (2017)
- "Believe in Me" (2017)
- "Siberian Itch" (2017)
- "All Messed Up" (2018)

=== Splits ===
- From Ohio with Love (2004)
