= Explains It All =

Studio album by Four Year Strong
- Released: July 21, 2009
- Genre: Melodic hardcore, pop punk
- Length: 33:22
- Label: I Surrender, Decaydance
- Producer: Machine

Four Year Strong chronology
Rise or Die Trying (2007)	Explains It All (2009)	Enemy of the World (2010)

Explains It All is the third studio album by American rock band Four Year Strong. It is a cover album and acts as a tribute to the band's influences from the 1990s. It features a guest appearance from Keith Buckley of Every Time I Die, among others. The album was released July 21, 2009 through I Surrender Records/Decaydance Records. By October 2009, the album's sales stood at 10,000.

== Release ==
Professional ratings
Review scores
Source	Rating
AllMusic	2.5/5 stars
Alternative Press	3.5/5 stars
Punknews.org	1.5/5 stars
Ultimate Guitar	8/10

On May 20, 2009, Explains It All was announced for release in two months' time. On June 3, 2009, the album's track listing was posted online. On July 8, 2009, "Semi-Charmed Life" was posted on the and's Myspace profile. In July and August 2009, the band went on a co-headlining US tour with Set Your Goals; main support came from Fireworks, while the Swellers, Grave Maker, Drive A and A Loss for Words appeared on select shows. Following this, they went on an East Coast tour with Fireworks, Crime in Stereo and A Loss for Words. In October and November, the band toured Europe as part of The Eastpak Antidote Tour. It was re-pressed on vinyl in June 2016.

There are multiple versions of this album, with notable differences being the arrangement of the "Fly" cover by featuring Travis McCoy, and the "Spider Webs" cover, which fades out on one version and does a straight cut on another.

== Track listing ==
No.	Title	Original artist (year)	Length
1.	"So Much for the Afterglow"	Everclear (1997)	2:50
2.	"Absolutely (Story of a Girl)"	Nine Days (2000)	2:55
3.	"Ironic"	Alanis Morissette (1996)	2:48
4.	"Bullet with Butterfly Wings" (featuring Keith Buckley)	The Smashing Pumpkins (1995)	3:04
5.	"Semi-Charmed Life"	Third Eye Blind (1997)	3:29
6.	"Spiderwebs/This Love"	No Doubt/Pantera (1995)/(1992)	3:03
7.	"Roll to Me"	Del Amitri (1995)	2:26
8.	"Fly" (featuring Travie McCoy)	Sugar Ray (1997)	3:48
9.	"In Bloom"	Nirvana (1991)	3:34
10.	"She Really Loved You" (featuring Peter "JR" Wasilewski & Buddy "Goldfinger" Schaub)	Reach the Sky (1999)	2:00
11.	"She's So High"	Tal Bachman (1999)	3:20

== Notes ==
The end of the song, "Spiderwebs" is taken from the song, "This Love" by Pantera.
