= Enemy of the World =

Studio album by Four Year Strong
- Released: March 9, 2010
- Genres: Pop punk, post-hardcore
- Length: 38:13
- Labels: Decaydance, Universal Motown
- Producer: Machine

Four Year Strong chronology
Explains It All (2009)	Enemy of the World (2010)	In Some Way, Shape, or Form (2011)

Singles from Enemy of the World
- 1. "It Must Really Suck to Be Four Year Strong Right Now" Released: December 21, 2009; 2. "Wasting Time (Eternal Summer)" Released: February 9, 2010; 3. "What the Hell Is a Gigawatt?" Released: February 27, 2010; 4. "Tonight We Feel Alive (On a Saturday)" Released: May 11, 2010

Enemy of the World is the fourth studio album by American rock band Four Year Strong. It is the final album to feature keyboardist Josh Lyford prior to his departure from the band in April 2011.

== Release ==
On December 18, 2009, it was announced that the band had signed to Universal Motown Records and that their next album, Enemy of the World would be released in three months' time. "It Must Really Suck to Be Four Year Strong Right Now" is the album's first single, released in the iTunes Store on December 21, 2009. "Wasting Time (Eternal Summer)" became available for streaming on AbsolutePunk on February 11. It was announced be the album's second single, and was released on February 9, 2010. In January and February 2010, the band embarked on a US tour with support from the Bled, This Time Next Year, Title Fight and Strike Anywhere. "What the Hell Is a Gigawatt?" was made available for streaming on Purevolume on February 27, 2010.

In February and March 2010, the band performed at Soundwave festival in Australia. The vinyl edition of the album was made available to pre-order on March 2. Enemy of the World was made available for streaming through Myspace on March 4, 2010, before it was released through Decaydance and Universal Motown Records on March 9, 2010. In March and April, the band went on a US tour alongside Every Time I Die, Polar Bear Club and Trapped Under Ice. "Tonight We Feel Alive (On a Saturday)" was released to radio on May 11. A deluxe version of the album made available for streaming through Warped Tour's website on June 21, 2010, before was released on June 25, 2010. It features "Bad News Bearz" alongside acoustic versions of four of the album's tracks. "Bad News Bearz" and the acoustic versions of "Tonight We Feel Alive (On a Saturday)" and "Wasting Time (Eternal Summer)" were posted online ahead of the reissue. A music video was released for "Tonight We Feel Alive (On a Saturday)" on August 9. The group performed on the Kerrang! Tour in the UK in February 2011.

In October 2022, the band announced that a fully re-recorded version of the album is set to be released on February 17, 2023.

== Reception ==
Professional ratings
Review scores
Source	Rating
AbsolutePunk	(87%)
AllMusic	3.5/5 stars
Dead Press!	8/10 stars
idobi	4/5 stars
Kerrang!	4/5 stars
Punknews.org	2.5/5 stars
Sputnikmusic	4/5 stars

AbsolutePunk reviewer Drew Beringer was extremely positive in his review, saying Enemy of the World "is a pop-punk juggernaut" and tops their previous album Rise or Die Trying by far.

The album sold over 12,000 copies in its first week, debuting at number 47 on the Billboard 200.

"Wasting Time (Eternal Summer)" was nominated at the Kerrang! Awards for Best Single, but lost to "Liquid Confidence" by You Me at Six. Dead Press! featured it as number 15 on their best albums of the year list. The album was included at number 39 on Rock Sound's "The 51 Most Essential Pop Punk Albums of All Time" list.

== Track listing ==
=== Original release ===
All songs written by Dan O'Connor and Alan Day, except where noted.

No.	Title	Writer(s)	Length
1.	"It Must Really Suck to Be Four Year Strong Right Now"	O'Connor	3:16
2.	"Tonight We Feel Alive (On a Saturday)"		3:43
3.	"Wasting Time (Eternal Summer)"	O'Connor	3:18
4.	"Nineteen with Neck Tatz"		3:24
5.	"Find My Way Back"		3:28
6.	"What the Hell Is a Gigawatt?" (featuring Jay Pepito of Reign Supreme)		3:07
7.	"One Step at a Time"		3:06
8.	"This Body Pays the Bill$"		3:20
9.	"Paul Revere's Midnight Ride"		3:55
10.	"Flannel Is the Color of My Energy"		3:29
11.	"Enemy of the World"		4:02
Total length:			38:13

Bonus tracks

iTunes bonus track
No.	Title	Length
12.	"Listen, Do You Smell Something?"	3:37

Special edition bonus tracks
No.	Title	Length
12.	"Bad News Bearz"	3:15
13.	"Tonight We Feel Alive (On a Saturday)" (acoustic)	4:41
14.	"One Step at a Time" (acoustic)	3:27
15.	"Find My Way Back" (acoustic)	3:31
16.	"Wasting Time (Eternal Summer)" (acoustic)	3:20
Total length:		56:33

== Song titles ==
- "It Must Really Suck to Be Four Year Strong Right Now" comes from a comment made by Scott Heisel of Alternative Press in a review of the Set Your Goals album This Will Be the Death of Us.
- "What the Hell Is a Gigawatt?" is a line from the film Back to the Future.
- "Flannel Is the Color of My Energy" is a reference to the chorus of the 311 song "Amber".
- The title of the bonus track "Listen, Do You Smell Something?" is a line in the film Ghostbusters.

== Chart performance ==
Chart	Peak position
U.S. Billboard 200	47
U.S. Billboard Alternative Albums	6
U.S. Billboard Rock Albums	9
U.S. Billboard Digital Albums	10

== Personnel ==
- Alan Day – lead vocals, rhythm and lead guitar
- Dan O'Connor – lead vocals, rhythm and lead guitar
- Joe Weiss – bass guitar, backing vocals
- Jake Massucco – drums, percussion
- Josh Lyford – unclean vocals, keyboards, synthesizer

Additional personnel

- Jay Pepito (of Reign Supreme) – additional vocals on "What the Hell Is a Gigawatt?"

Production

- Machine – producer
- John Feldmann – mixing
- Brandon Paddock & Erik Ron – mix assistants
- Joe Gastwirt – mastering
- Will Putney, Machine – engineer
- Clinton Bradley – additional synth programming
- Jeremy Comitas, Bill Purcell – editing/Pro Tools
- Pete Wentz – A&R for Decaydance Records
- Shep Goodman – A&R for Universal Motown
- Elizabeth Vago – A&R coordination
- Cliff Rigano – product manager
- Ken Kelly – illustrations
- Joe Spix – art direction & design
