= Dollar Signs (band) =

American rock band

- Origin: Charlotte, North Carolina, United States
- Genres: punk rock; pop punk; folk punk; anti-folk
- Years active: 2009–2025
- Labels: Pure Noise Records, A-F Records, Possum Heart Records, Scaredy Cat Records
- Members: Erik Button; Dylan Wachman; Arion Chamberlain; Tommy McPhail; Luke Gunn

Dollar Signs was a punk rock band from Charlotte, North Carolina, United States. The band released five full-length records as well as several EPs.

== History ==
Dollar Signs started as an acoustic project of Erik Button and Luke Gunn. After performing for several years in the North Carolina region, the band was joined by Dylan Wachman and Arion Chamberlain. Dylan Wachman and Erik Button would go on to create the local record label Scaredy Cat Records, which is where the band released much of their early material. In 2015, the band released their album "Yikes".

After the release of "Yikes", the band changed course and started changing direction into pop punk. The release of "Life is Ruff" saw the band pressing their own vinyl via their imprint Possum Heart Records. It was also the first time the band was pressed to vinyl. Additionally, this was the start of the band's touring history, where they embarked on their first major United States tour, which covered the east coast and the midwest.

In 2018, Dollar Signs signed to A-F Records, which saw the release of This Will Haunt Me. The record was introduced to the world by Dan Ozzi via Noisey. The lead single "Waste My Life Away" featured puppets that looked like the band members having a night in Las Vegas.

Dollar Signs surprise-released their EP "I Need Some Space" on Acrobat Unstable Records in early 2019. The band took the opportunity to breathe new life into older songs by re-recording them with their new lineup.

In December 2020, Dollar Signs released the song "Negative Blood" alongside their signing with Pure Noise Records. In January 2021, they announced their debut record for the label, Hearts Of Gold, with a music video for the track "Bad News".

In January 2025, the band announced on Instagram that they would be ending the band at the end of 2025.

== Lyrical and musical style ==
Musically, the band has evolved out of folk punk over time and into more of a party punk sound, akin to Jeff Rosenstock and Direct Hit!. While the band started as just a two-piece, the added members and time passing added a lot of elements to their more recent songs

Lyrically, the songs frantically dissect the woes of living life as a young person in the modern time. Erik has said,

"Our music is written about these transitional phases in life. Usually, when you’re in your early or mid-twenties, the transitional phases are always because you’re in between relationships or jobs or moving different places. Whereas [Hearts of Gold] is more about having all of the tools that you need to change yourself and fix yourself and then how difficult it is to change. Putting in the energy to work on yourself is extremely difficult and instead of making a record that’s like ‘oh, I went through this transformation and now I’m a great person’…it’s more about doing the hard work on yourself to hopefully become a better person and not just make the same mistakes over and over again."

== Discography ==
Studio albums

Album	Year	Label
The Death of the Party	2014	Self Released
Yikes	2015	Death To False Hope Records
This Will Haunt Me	2018	A-F Records
Hearts of Gold	2021	Pure Noise Records
Legend Tripping	2023	Self Aware Records

EPs and other

Name	Year	Label
The Wonder Beers (Compilation)	2012	Self Released
Life Is Ruff	2017	Possum Heart Records
I Need Some Space	2019	A-F Records
