= Four Year Strong =

American pop punk band

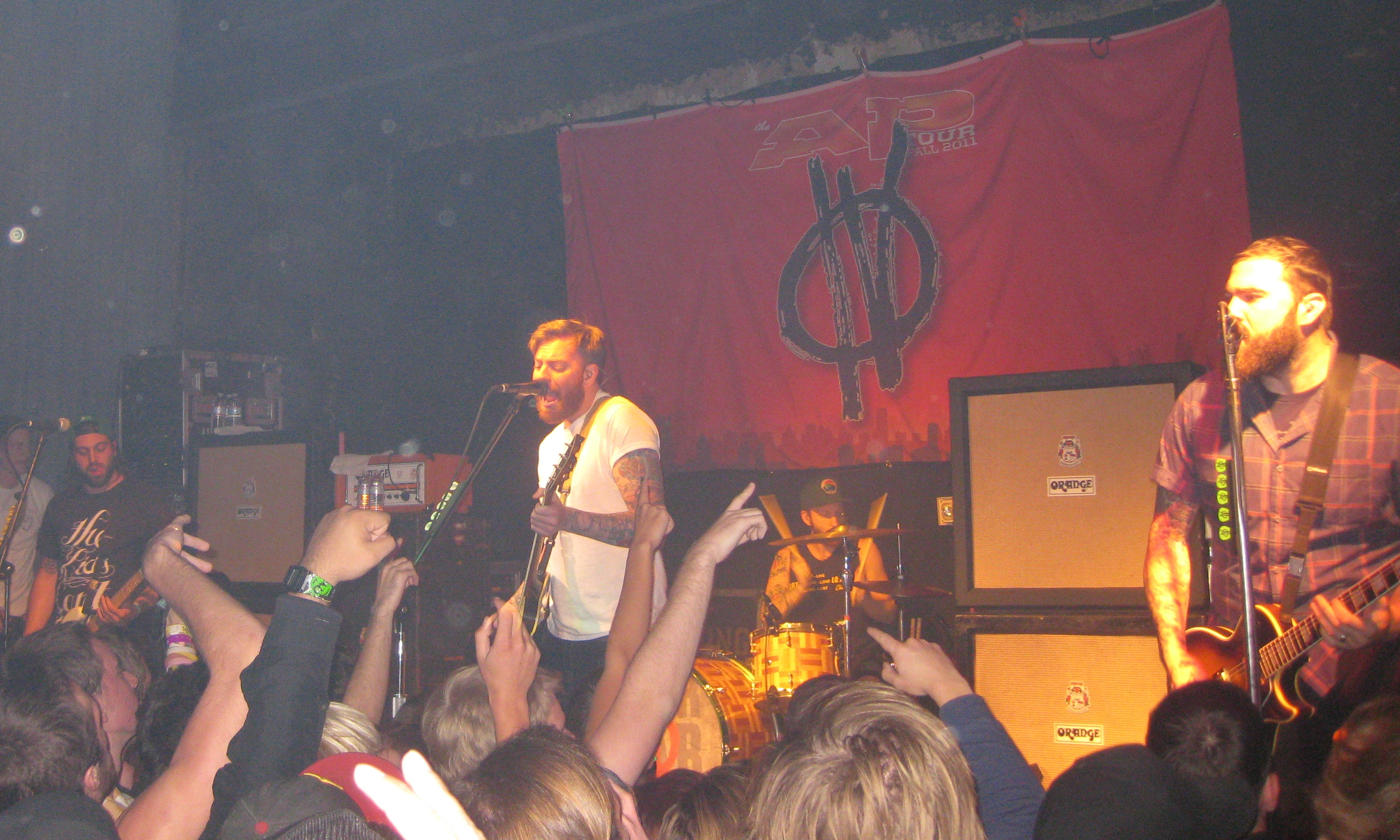
- Four Year Strong in 2011. From left to right: Weiss, Day, Massucco, and O'Connor.

Background information
- Origin: Worcester, Massachusetts, U.S.
- Genres: Pop-punk; melodic hardcore; easycore; emo
- Years active: 2001–present
- Labels: Open Your Eyes; Decaydance; I Surrender; Universal Motown; Pure Noise
- Members: Dan O'Connor; Alan Day; Jackson Massucco; Joe Weiss
- Past members: Josh Lyford; Eric Stone
- Website: fouryearstrong.com

Four Year Strong is an American pop-punk band from Worcester, Massachusetts, formed in 2001. The group consists of vocalists and guitarists Dan O'Connor and Alan Day, bassist Joe Weiss, and drummer Jake Massucco. They have released eight studio albums; their most recent album, Analysis Paralysis, was released on August 9, 2024, through Pure Noise Records.

== History ==
=== Formation and early releases (2001–2006) ===
Four Year Strong was formed in Worcester, Massachusetts, in 2001 by Dan O'Connor, Alan Day, Jake Massucco and a fourth musician who played bass guitar. They all attended Doherty Memorial High School. Soon, they released a demo EP titled All The Lonely Girls. In the subsequent years, they released two more EPs; The Glory EP (2003) and a three track demo in 2004. Around this time, Joe Weiss was brought in as a replacement bassist. In 2005 the band released their first studio album, It's Our Time, digitally on Open Your Eyes Records. They went on a West Coast and Midwest tour with Maida and the Fully Down in October and November 2005. They went on a tour with Showoff in March and April 2006.

The band released another demo in 2006, which contained early versions of their songs from Rise or Die Trying. Keyboardist Josh Lyford joined in late 2006 to make the band a five-piece.

=== Rise or Die Trying, Explains It All (2006–2009) ===
The band's 2007 release Rise or Die Trying with I Surrender Records peaked at number 31 on the Billboard Heatseekers chart in its debut week. On the back of their increasing popularity, the band was signed to Decaydance Records in February 2008.

On July 21, 2009, Four Year Strong released a covers album, titled Explains It All. The album features guest appearances from Keith Buckley of Every Time I Die, Travie McCoy of Gym Class Heroes, and JR and Buddy of Less Than Jake. The band explained their reasoning behind the album in a MySpace blog, saying "It's what we grew up listening to. Everyone has those songs that instantly transport you back to when you were younger. Whether we were in our bedrooms playing air guitar, or riding in the car to little league practice, or it was just that song that was all over the radio during that awesome summer at the Cape. These songs have impacted us in some way and we want to share that feeling with you."

=== Enemy of the World (2010–2011) ===
The band's third full-length album, Enemy of the World, was released on March 9, 2010, with Universal Motown Records. The band released the album's first single, "It Must Really Suck to Be Four Year Strong Right Now", on December 21, 2009. The name of the song is a reference to the final sentence of a review in Alternative Press in which the magazine praised Set Your Goals' new album while remarking on the future of Four Year Strong and how their record would compare. The vinyl record was made available to pre-order on March 2, 2010. The album sold 12,400 copies in its first week, debuting at number 47 on the Billboard 200. Four Year Strong has accompanied Set Your Goals in an Asian tour, but both canceled touring in Indonesia.

=== In Some Way, Shape, or Form and hiatus (2011–2013) ===
On April 3, 2011, it was announced that Josh Lyford would be leaving the band. Initially, it was implied that Lyford had chosen to leave in order to focus on his side project, Foxfires. However, it was later confirmed by both Lyford and Alan Day that Lyford had been ejected from the band, as the musicians had elected to remove synthesizers from their sound, leaving no room for Lyford to continue. On April 13, 2011, in an interview with Alternative Press, the band revealed that they had been in the middle of recording their fourth studio album with producer David Bendeth in New Jersey's House of Loud. The band was set to return to the studio, without Josh Lyford, to finish the album in June, after they finished touring with Rise Against. Vocalist Alan Day also revealed that the new songs the band had written were very diverse, and that the new material was different from anything the band had ever written before. While touring with Rise Against, they played a newly recorded, yet unreleased, song called "Falling on You".

On August 18, 2011, the band released "Stuck in the Middle", a new song from the upcoming album. The band announced that the new album, In Some Way, Shape, or Form, would be released on November 8, 2011. On September 8, 2011, the band released another song from the album, titled "Falling on You". The first official single from the album, "Just Drive", was released on September 27, 2011. During the Fall 2011 AP Tour, the band played another new unreleased song to be released on the upcoming album. The band dedicated it to fans who have been there "from the very beginning, and will be there till the very end"; a video of the song has been leaked on YouTube. It is called "Fairweather Fan". In an interview, it was revealed that Four Year Strong would be playing the Warped Tour 2012.

As of May 15, 2012, Four Year Strong parted ways with their label Universal Motown/Universal Republic. Regardless of the departure of the label, the band is still active as they played at the 2012 Warped Tour, and they performed with Blink-182 on their UK and Ireland tour. As of 2013, rumors have speculated if Four Year Strong had broken up. O'Connor had been married to his wife for almost two years, and Day started his side project The Here and Now, an alternative/blues group who released an EP of music that year. When interviewed by PropertyOfZack, Day mentioned that the band isn't breaking up but rather taking time off. Going further, he said, "This is the first time in five years or more that we've taken more than three weeks off on tour...We're definitely not breaking up. It seems like a lot of people are saying that, but I don't know why they're saying that. Just because we haven't come through your city three times this year doesn't mean we're broken up."

=== Signing to Pure Noise Records, Go Down in History EP and Self-titled album (2014–2016) ===
During their annual holiday show in Worcester, MA in 2013, Four Year Strong announced they were working on new material set to be released at a later date. They later announced an upcoming North American tour supporting Bayside set to tour throughout April 2014 and will play the Vans Warped Tour in its entirety the following summer. On May 27, 2014, the band announced a new EP titled Go Down in History, to be released through Pure Noise Records, on July 22, 2014. The EP's lead single, entitled "Tread Lightly", was released on June 5, and the EP was streamed in its entirety a day prior to release. The EP received critical acclaim upon release, with many critics praising the band's return to their signature sound. The band, as of October, has tweeted and posted photos on Instagram confirming that they are in the studio recording a new full-length album, set to release sometime during 2015. They kick off their Go Down in History tour on November 1, 2014, accompanied by Transit, Such Gold, and Seaway.

The band's self-titled album was released on June 2, 2015. The album was produced by Converge guitarist Kurt Ballou. Vocalist/guitarist Dan O' Connor stated that the album was "one of the most raw records we've ever made, it's just us playing. No fancy computer shit. Made for singing along and head banging.".

On April 9, 2015, they released a single titled "We All Float Down Here", followed by "I'm a Big, Bright, Shining Star" and "Eating My Words" on April 27 and May 13, respectively.

The album was made available for streaming on May 27.

=== Rise Or Die Trying 10th Anniversary Tour and Some of You Will Like This, Some of You Won't (2017–2019) ===
On November 9, 2016, the band announced a 10th Anniversary World Tour for their album Rise or Die Trying in which they played the album in its entirety for every tour date. Beginning in late January 2017, the tour spanned several countries, eventually coming to an end in February 2018.

While touring, the band also released a new compilation album titled Some of You Will Like This, Some of You Won't which contained re-workings and re-recordings of several of their most popular songs as well as several rarities. The album was released September 8, 2017.

The band also performed on the entirety of the final Vans Warped Tour in 2018.

=== Brain Pain and Enemy of the World re-recording (2020-2023) ===
On January 14, 2020, the band announced their next album Brain Pain, which was released on February 28, 2020, through Pure Noise Records. The announcement was accompanied by the release of the first two singles from the album, "Talking Myself in Circles" and "Brain Pain".

The band featured on the song "Sundress" on the State Champs album, Kings of the New Age, that was released on May 13, 2022. On May 17, the band released a new single, a cover of the Green Day song "Brain Stew / Jaded", on the Pure Noise Records split single, "Dead Formats, Vol. 1".

In Spring and Summer 2022, the band opened for New Found Glory's Sticks and Stones 20th anniversary tour, alongside Be Well.

In October 2022, the band announced they will be releasing a re-recorded version of their 2010 album, Enemy of the World, on October 27, 2022.

=== Analysis Paralysis (2023–present) ===
In November 2023 and April 2024, the band released the songs "Dead End Friend" and "Daddy of Mine", respectively. On May 28, 2024, the band released the song "Uncooked" and announced their eighth album Analysis Paralysis. It was released on August 9, 2024.

On November 6, 2025, the band released a new single, "Whiplash", accompanied by a music video. That same month, they also announced they would be the direct support for The Devil Wears Prada's Flowers Spring 2026 US headlining tour, with additional support from Split Chain and I Promised The World.

The band are confirmed to be making an appearance at Welcome to Rockville, which will take place in Daytona Beach, Florida in May 2026.

== Touring ==
The band has participated in multiple national tours, sharing the stage with such bands as the Starting Line, Slip On It, Hellogoodbye, From First to Last, Every Time I Die, Meg & Dia, Hidden in Plain View, Alexisonfire, All Time Low, Blink-182, Mayday Parade, New Found Glory, Bayside and Steel Train.

The band toured in February–April 2009 as part of the Taste of Chaos tour, alongside Thursday, Bring Me the Horizon, Pierce the Veil, and Cancer Bats. They undertook the Summer co-headline tour with Set Your Goals, Fireworks, the Swellers, Polar Bear Club, A Loss for Words, Drive A and Grave Maker from July to August 2009. Four Year Strong also performed on the Australian Soundwave festival in February and March 2010, alongside headliners Faith No More, Jane's Addiction, Placebo; also playing alongside Alexisonfire, Set Your Goals, A Day to Remember, Paramore, It Dies Today, Gallows, Emarosa, A Wilhelm Scream, Anthrax, All Time Low, Escape the Fate, This Is Hell, Enter Shikari, Anti-Flag, Baroness, Comeback Kid, The Almost, Dance Gavin Dance, Architects, You Me at Six, Rolo Tomassi, Dichi Michi, Sunny Day Real Estate and many more. In May 2010, the band subbed the mainstage at Slam Dunk Festival in Hatfield and Leeds, playing alongside New Found Glory, Set Your Goals, the Wonder Years, Hit The Lights and many more. The band was in the lineup for Vans Warped Tour 2010.

They also played the first day on the Bamboozle festival. Late 2010, Four Year Strong headlined a tour with Comeback Kid, The Wonder Years, American Fangs, and Mountain Man. The tour was titled "Tonight We Feel Alive!", and spanned the entire United States. In February 2011, Four Year Strong co-headlined the Kerrang! Relentless Tour 2011 with Good Charlotte with support from Framing Hanley and the Wonder Years. The tour began on February 3, 2011, in Dublin, Ireland. On February 15, 2011, it was announced that they had been added to support Blink-182 on their UK tour alongside You Me at Six. They joined Rise Against and Bad Religion on a US summer tour in 2011. They also announced that they will come back to Australia later in the year to play Soundwave Revolution along with already announced bands the Damned Things, Story of the Year, Every Time I Die, Hellogoodbye, We Are the In Crowd and many others.

The band performed with New Found Glory and Attack Attack! in September 2011 in Brazil on the XLive Music Festival (Curitiba 08/09, Rio de Janeiro 09/09 and São Paulo 10/09). It was announced the band would be supporting Blink-182 during their UK Arena tour in summer 2011, however, the tour was postponed until 2012, but Four Year Strong would be supporting, along with Blink-182 and the All-American Rejects, but only for their chosen dates. The other dates are taken up by Twin Atlantic and the Blackout.

Four Year Strong toured in the UK in January 2012, along with Don Broco as support.

Four Year Strong embarked on a headline tour of Europe in 2017 to mark the 10th Anniversary of the album Rise or Die Trying, which started in Barcelona Spain and finished in the UK; they had 20 dates booked throughout February including but not limited to Berlin, Munich, Amsterdam, Paris, London, Dublin and Belfast.

== Musical style ==
The band's sound can be described as a blend of pop-punk and hardcore punk. The band simply developed their sound off the idea of playing 'exactly what they want to hear' or music that they would listen to, but no one else was playing at the time. The band's sound has been described as a "combination of pop-punk energy, uplifting singalong choruses, and metalcore flourishes". with "assertive and (relatively speaking) intricate guitar lines and riffs". This fusion between pop punk and metalcore has been often labeled as "easycore", a style the band is considered to have popularized alongside New Found Glory.

== Band members ==
Current

- Alan Day – lead vocals, guitars, keyboard, programming (2001–present), bass (2001–2004)
- Dan O'Connor – lead vocals, guitars, keyboard, programming (2001–present), bass (2001–2004)
- Jake Massucco – drums, percussion (2001–present)
- Joe Weiss – bass, backing vocals (2004–present)

Former

- Josh Lyford – keyboards, synthesizer, unclean vocals, backing vocals (2006–2011)
- Eric Stone – keyboards, synthesizer (2004–2006)

== Discography ==
- It's Our Time (2005)
- Rise or Die Trying (2007)
- Explains It All (2009)
- Enemy of the World (2010)
- In Some Way, Shape, or Form (2011)
- Four Year Strong (2015)
- Brain Pain (2020)
- Analysis Paralysis (2024)
