= Oh No Not Stereo =

American rock band

- Also known as: ONNS
- Origin: Los Angeles, California, United States
- Genres: Pop-punk; alternative rock
- Years active: 2003–present
- Label: Takeover
- Members: Skyler Nielsen; Mykul Lee
- Website: ohnonotstereo.com

Oh No Not Stereo is an American rock band from Los Angeles, California.

== History ==
=== Formation/001 ===
Oh No Not Stereo was formed by Skyler Nielsen and Myk Agee in Hollywood, California in June 2003. The two met at a music store in Hollywood within months of moving to LA. Immediately they collaborated musically and began writing together, developing their concept of a live-duo that delivers a full 'conventional' sound. (The band's name relates to Nielsen's inability to hear out of his right ear, suffered from a serious ATV accident in 1993.) In December 2004, the duo recorded with producer Marc Jordan (Velvet Revolver, Rock Kills Kid, A Static Lullaby) and independently released their first full-length record "001" on May 10, 2005.

=== Trio/002 ===
Oh No Not Stereo toured relentlessly as a duo for eighteen months before meeting Joshley Hogan in Oklahoma City in February 2005. He soon relocated to Los Angeles to join the band playing bass. In October 2005, the three piece re-hired Marc Jordan to record a self-titled EP, which they would release independently in January 2006. Nielsen and Lee continued to tour with Hogan until he left the band in June of that same year. The duo soon then-after signed a distribution deal with Takeover Records in November 2006. They re-packaged, re-mastered and re-released their EP with the label on Feb 20th 2007, this time referring to the EP as "002". The sixth track on the re-release is different than the sixth track self-titled EP; the band decided to replace "Monster" with "Every Link In The Chain", which was engineered by Ken Harter at Wedge Studios in Long Beach. The band filed for breach of contract with Takeover Records shortly afterward due to financial struggles with the label.

Warren Miller Films and MTV Networks regularly licensed Oh No Not Stereo's music for use in shows such as Bam's Unholy Union, Paris Hilton's My New BFF, and Meet the Barkers. The group was also chosen out of over 4,000 bands to compete in MTV2's Dew Circuit Breakout contest in 2007.

=== Quartet/003 & 004 ===
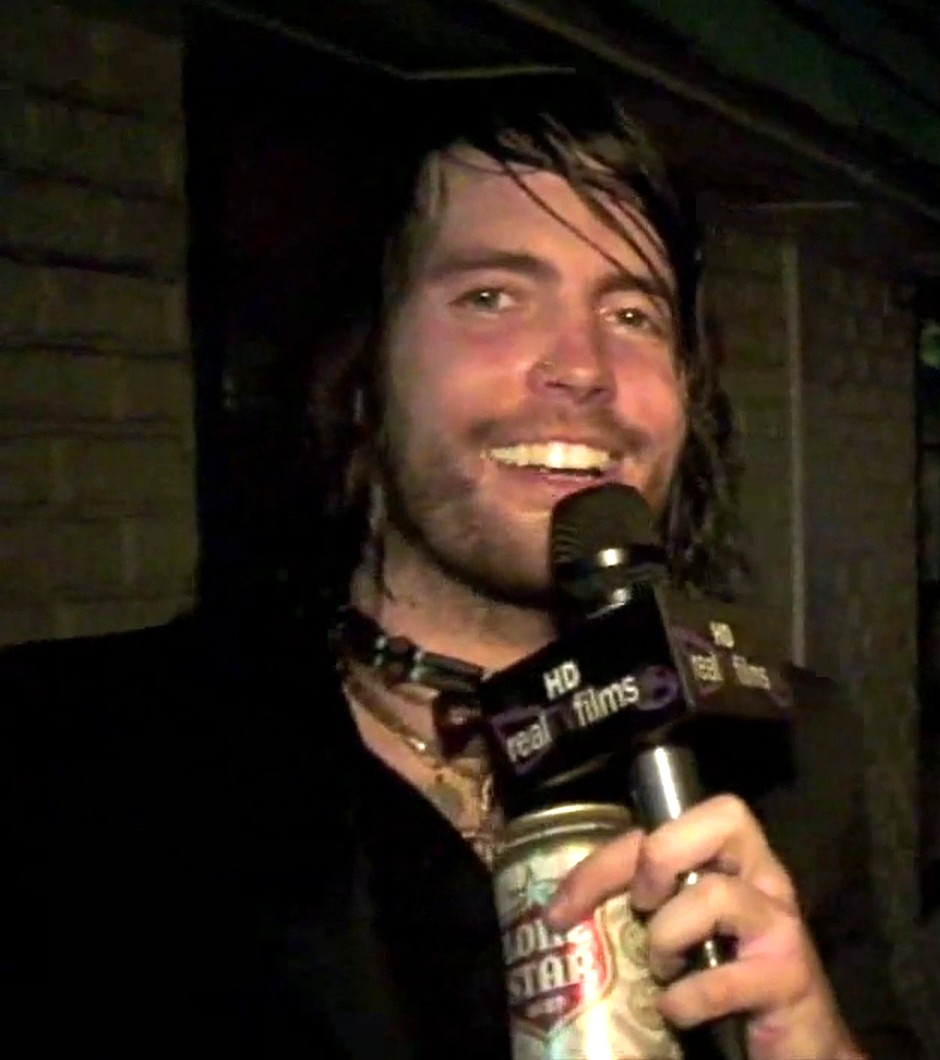
Frontman Skyler Nielsen in 2009

Oh No Not Stereo added Michael Rosenthal on bass and Pat O'Donnell on second guitar before playing SXSW in 2007, Vans Warped Tour dates and touring with Sugarcult that spring and summer. Nielsen and Lee inhabited a house in Scottsdale, Arizona where they wrote over 50 songs together between May and July 2007. They then returned to the studio in October 2007 to self-produce their latest works, "003" and "004", with assisted production from Max Coane (Jack's Mannequin, The Rocket Summer), and Jim Wirt (Incubus, Something Corporate, Jack's Mannequin). After the two-month recording process, Scott Trieglaff was added on bass and Brandon Henderson was added on second guitar for their 'SxSW Tour 2008'. With this line-up, Oh No Not Stereo completed over 25,000 miles of touring across the U.S. between March and June 2008. The band also a completed a co-headlining UK tour with Bayside and Hit The Lights in December 2008 with touring members Jussi Karvinen and Airin Older (Sugarcult). In January 2009 ONNS supported The All-American Rejects in the UK with Jussi Karvinen on guitar and touring bass player Everett Connors. The band was a featured showcasing artist at the South By Southwest Music Festival in Austin, Texas in March 2009, with Marc Wysocki on bass guitar.

After the digital release of their latest record (003) on January 13 (2009) Oh No Not Stereo designed a Limited Edition Bonus EP (released as 004) to be included in the Deluxe Edition of the album for fan club members and online pre-orders. The physical release of the 15-track record was on March 10, stocking the shelves of select Hot Topic and Best Buy stores nationwide. As an effort to reward fans and friends on the mailing list, and shine a light on the dynamic capability of the band, ONNS offered a free download every Monday in October (2009) of exclusive live-acoustic tracks and video footage of "Say Anything", "All You", "This Friday Night", and "Let's Get It Started".

As a result of their successful independently driven marketing campaign, ONNS spent seven consecutive weeks on the CMJ Top 200 radio charts.

=== InCaseOfStaresUseFire ===
Skyler and Mykul spent much of 2010 writing new material for their third full-length release, "InCaseOfStaresUseFire". Throughout the year, the pair wrote over 50 new songs which they kept track of on a whiteboard in their kitchen. By the end of the year, as the duo prepared to fly producer Jayson DeZuzio (Foxy Shazam, Coheed and Cambria) to LA from New Jersey, they selected and organized the material into a cohesive album.

Ten songs were recorded over six weeks in early 2011 at the band's home studio, as well as at SoundFactory Studios in California, with guitarist Jussi Karvinen contributing to the writing, recording, and pre-production of the album. The album's tracks feature a variety of styles and themes, with an emphasis on positive perspectives.

“We take a lot of pride in being independent, which allows us to do whatever we want musically,” Skyler says. “No two songs on this record are about the same thing or same person, yet each song was written in confidence that the listener will be able to relate.”

Additionally, the band spent 16 weeks this summer conceptualizing and filming a music video for every song on the album. The intention: To infuse the record with additional life and offer visual experiences that parallel the meanings of the tracks. As an added bonus, the video for "All You" was licensed for MTV’s current reboot of Beavis and Butt-Head.

== Band members ==
=== Songwriters ===
- Mykul Lee – drums, percussion, guitar, piano, b3
- Skyler Nielsen – vocals, guitar, piano, drums, bass, organs

=== Touring members ===
- Josh Hogan – bass (2005–2006)
- Mike Rosenthal – bass (2007)
- Pat O'Donnell – guitar (2007)
- Brandon Henderson – guitar (2008)
- Scott Trieglaff – bass (2008)
- Airin Older – bass (2008–2009)
- Jussi Karvinen – guitar (present)
- Marc Wysocki – bass (2010)
- Ryan Williams – bass (2011)
- Everett Connors – bass (present)

== Discography ==
- 001 [LP] (Self-Released, 2005)
- Oh No Not Stereo EP (Self-Released, 2006)
- Oh No Not Stereo EP (002 [EP]) (Takeover Records, 2007)
- 003 [LP] (Self-Released, 2009)
- 004 [(UNRELEASED) BONUS EP] (Self-Released, 2009)
- "We Are Who We Are (You Can't Take That Away)" [SINGLE] (Self-Released, 2010)
- InCaseOfStaresUseFire [LP] (Oh No Not Stereo, LLC / BFM Digital, 2011)
