= In Some Way, Shape, or Form =

Studio album by Four Year Strong
- Released: November 8, 2011
- Recorded: June–August 2011
- Studio: House of Loud, Elmwood Park, New Jersey, U.S.
- Genre: Pop punk, post-hardcore, alternative rock
- Length: 40:55
- Label: Decaydance, Universal Republic
- Producer: David Bendeth, Shep Goodman, Aaron Accetta

Four Year Strong chronology
Enemy of the World (2010)	In Some Way, Shape, or Form (2011)	Go Down in History (2014)

Singles from In Some Way, Shape, or Form
- 1. "Just Drive" Released: September 27, 2011; 2. "Falling on You" Released: September 8, 2011

In Some Way, Shape, or Form is the fifth studio album by American rock band Four Year Strong, released through Decaydance and Universal Republic on November 8, 2011.

== Recording and composition ==
On April 4, it was announced that keyboardist Josh Lyford had left the group. The album was recorded between June–August 2011 at House of Loud Recording Studios in Elmwood Park, New Jersey. David Bendeth produced all of the tracks except for "Fairweather Fan" and "Bring on the World"; recording was handled by Dan Korneff, Kato Khandwala, and John Bender. "Fairweather Fan" and "Bring on the World" were produced and engineered by Shep Goodman and Aaron Accetta. Chris Fasulo and Jon D'Uva did additional engineering with assistance from Brian Robbins and Jon Lammi. Bendeth mixed the recordings with Korneff as engineer, before they were mastered by Ted Jensen at Sterling Sound. The album was influenced by Alexisonfire's Crisis (2006).

== Release ==
In August 2011, the group performed at the Hevy and Sonisphere festivals in the UK. On August 18, the band released the song "Stuck in the Middle" for free listening as a free taster from the album, with an unofficial music video following on October 19, which showed footage of the band on their latest tour and features scenes of the recording process of In Some Way, Shape, or Form. On September 8, 2011, the band released another song for free, "Falling on You", which was already played live on the band's latest tour. On September 11, In Some Way, Shape, or Form was announced for release in November. Alongside it, the album's artwork was revealed. "Just Drive" was released to radio on September 27. On October 14, Alternative Press revealed the track list of the album.

On October 26, the band released another song for free listening. The song, entitled "Fairweather Fan", is a special song the band dedicated to their fans and was previously leaked in low quality footage that was filmed during the band's Fall 2011 AP Tour, where they debuted the song. The band released the song as a free download on their Facebook page. A music video was released for "Just Drive" on October 27. On November 4, the band uploaded the whole album for free streaming on their Facebook page. In October and November, the band headlined the AP Fall Tour with support from Gallows, Title Fight, the Swellers and Sharks.

In December, the band went on a brief holiday tour dubbed It's a Wonderful Gig Life, with support from Set Your Goals, Balance and Composure, Transit, and Diamond. In January 2012, the group went on a tour of Brazil with New Found Glory, leading up to a UK tour that ran into February, with support from Don Broco and A Loss for Words. Though This Time Next Year was intended to also join the tour, they had to pull out due to financial issues. In June, the group appeared at Download Festival, and supported Blink-182 for a handful of shows on their UK tour. Alongside this, they played a one-off headlining show.

== Reception ==
Professional ratings
Aggregate scores
Source	Rating
Metacritic	60/100
Review scores
Source	Rating
AbsolutePunk	60%
AllMusic	3/5 stars
Alter the Press!	3/5 stars
Big Cheese	5/5 stars
Dead Press!	7/10 stars
Kill Your Stereo	6.5/10 stars
Loudwire	Favorable
Sputnikmusic	2.5/5 stars

The album sold over 6,500 copies in its first week, debuting at number 88 on the Billboard 200, nearly half of what their previous album Enemy of the World sold in its first week.

== Track listing ==
All songs written by Four Year Strong, except where noted.

No.	Title	Writer(s)	Length
1.	"The Infected"	Four Year Strong, David Bendeth	3:17
2.	"The Security of the Familiar, the Tranquility of Repetition"	Four Year Strong, Bendeth	3:28
3.	"Stuck in the Middle"		3:42
4.	"Just Drive"		3:32
5.	"Fairweather Fan"		3:30
6.	"Sweet Kerosene"		3:22
7.	"Falling on You"		3:36
8.	"Heaven Wasn't Built to Hold Me"		3:06
9.	"Unbreakable"		3:12
10.	"Bring on the World"		3:12
11.	"Fight the Future"		3:04
12.	"Only the Meek Get Pinched. The Bold Survive"		3:51
Total length:			40:52

== Song titles ==
- "The Security of the Familiar, the Tranquility of Repetition" is a line from the film V for Vendetta.
- "Only the Meek Get Pinched, the Bold Survive" is a line from the film Ferris Bueller's Day Off.
- "Fight The Future" is titled in reference to the first X-Files film, of which "Fight the Future" was the subtitle and tagline. The X-Files is also heavily referenced in the music video for the album's first single "Just Drive", including a street sign that reads "The truth is out there," one of the mottos of the series.
- When a tentative track listing was released, "Bring on the World" was shown to be titled "This Is Your Life and It's Ending One Minute at a Time", a line from the film Fight Club.

== Personnel ==
Personnel per booklet.

Four Year Strong

- Alan Day – lead vocals, guitar, additional piano
- Dan O'Connor – lead vocals, guitar
- Joe Weiss – bass guitar, additional vocals (tracks 3 and 12)
- Jake Massucco – drums

Production

- David Bendeth – producer (all except tracks 5 and 10), mixing
- Dan Korneff – recording, mix engineer
- Kato Khandwala – recording
- John Bender – recording
- Shep Goodman – producer (tracks 5 and 10), engineer (tracks 5 and 10)
- Aaron Accetta – producer (tracks 5 and 10), engineer (tracks 5 and 10)
- Chris Fasulo – additional engineering
- Jon D'Uva – additional engineering
- Brian Robbins – assistant engineer
- Michael "Mitch" Milan – guitar technician
- Jon Lammi – assistant engineer
- Ted Jensen – mastering

Design

- Joe Spix – art direction, design
- F. Scott Schafer – photography
- Bryn Bowen – props
- Four Year Strong – props
