= Forever Came Calling =

American pop punk band

- Origin: Twentynine Palms, California, United States
- Genres: Pop punk, emo
- Years active: 2006–present
- Labels: Pure Noise Records & Penultimate Records
- Members: Joe Candelaria
- Past members: John Swaba; Bryce Esquivel; Thomas Lovejoy; Isaac Taylor; Mark Amorossi; Jimmy Dale; Cody Conners; Chris Conklin; Jeffrey Tedtaotao; Ron Grieger; Carl Lakey
- Website: forevercamecalling.com

Forever Came Calling is an American pop punk band from Twentynine Palms, California.

== History ==
The band formed in the year 2006 as a Senses Fail and Taking Back Sunday cover band. After multiple line up changes, John Swaba joined as bassist. They then recorded and released their EP, HopE P.assion. They were featured on the documentary, No Room For Rockstars which helped them gain fame. They released their first split EP with Handguns, in 2011 with Bryce on Drums. In 2012 they released their first full-length album, Contender and soon after got a new guitarist, Isaac Taylor.
They released second split EP with Family Thief, in 2013.

In October 2014 they released their second full-length album, What Matters Most. In the summer of 2015 they collaborated with Ronald Records to put out their first EP and some songs recorded prior to that release on cassette. The release, "Songs From High School." was exclusive to their Rather Be Dead Than Cool tour, but they sold extra merchandise from the tour in August. Third/touring guitarist Tom "the mop" Lovejoy joined the group after the departure of Isaac Taylor in 2015.

In January 2018 the band announced their new EP "Retro Future", as well as a tour with In Her Own Words kicking off in Lafayette, LA at the 2018 Wilhelm Records Music Festival and signing with Penultimate Records in Australia.

== Members ==
Present

- Joe Candelaria - vocals, guitar (2006–Present)

Past

- Mark Amorossi - drums (2006)
- Jimmy Dale - drums (2006-2007)
- Cody Conners - guitar (2006-2007)
- Chris Conklin - bass (2006-2008)
- Jeffrey Tedtaotao - drums (2007-?)
- Ron Grieger - guitar (2011-2012)
- Carl Lakey - guitar (2011-?)
- Isaac Taylor - guitar, backing vocals (2012-2015)
- Thomas Lovejoy - guitar, backing vocals (2015–2018)
- Bryce Esquivel - drums (2011–2015)
- John Swaba - bass (2008–2019)

Timeline

== Discography ==
=== Albums ===
- Contender (Pure Noise Records, 2012) - U.S. Heatseekers #29
- What Matters Most... (Pure Noise Records, 2014) - U.S #179, U.S. Heatseekers #6

=== EPs ===
- This Is Me Dreaming (February 24, 2006)
- HopE P.assion (February 10, 2010)
- Retro Future (2018) (self-released, US, Penultimate Records AUS) - #5 Billboard, U.S. Heatseekers #11

=== Split EPs ===
- Handguns/Forever Came Calling (November 8, 2011)
- Family Thief/Forever Came Calling (November 19, 2013)

=== Compilations ===
- Songs from High School (2015)
