= Glamour Kills =

American clothing company

- Industry: clothing
- Founded: 2006
- Founder: Mark Capicotto
- Headquarters: Manhattan, New York
- Area served: Canada; United Kingdom; Japan; Brazil; Europe; Asia
- Website: glamourkills.com

Glamour Kills is a clothing company based in Manhattan, New York. The company was closely associated with emo musical artists, and its shirt with a stylized flying pig was called "iconic" by The Daily Edge.

The company was started in 2006, by Mark Capicotto and made its debut at The Bamboozle Festival in the spring.

The company worked with bands such as: All Time Low, Cobra Starship, The Maine, Mayday Parade, We The Kings, The Wonder Years, and New Found Glory.
