= Rise or Die Trying =

Studio album by Four Year Strong
- Released: September 18, 2007
- Studios: Big Sky Audio, Springfield, PA; Mariano, Philadelphia, PA
- Genres: Easycore; pop-punk; hardcore punk
- Length: 32:16
- Labels: I Surrender, Decaydance
- Producers: Matt Robnett, Nik Tyler

Four Year Strong chronology
It's Our Time (2005)	Rise or Die Trying (2007)	Explains It All (2009)

Rise or Die Trying is the second studio album from American rock band Four Year Strong. The name "Rise or Die Trying" comes from a lyric to "Go Long Dad", a song from their first album, It's Our Time.

== Music and lyrics ==
Rise or Die Trying is considered to be a pop-punk album. The album's instrumentation and attack takes stylistic cues from hardcore punk, while the vocals and lyrical content draw from emo and alternative rock. Alternative Press described the album as "scene music". The publication also stated that the album was "the heaviest pop-punk album" released in 2007.

== Background and production ==
The group released their debut album It's Our Time in January 2005, and followed it up with another EP later that year.

The album was recorded and produced by Matt Robnett and Nik Tyler of Playwork Productions at Big Sky Audio in Springfield, Pennsylvania in March 2007.

== Release ==
On July 14, 2007, Rise or Die Trying was announced for release in two months' time. Four Year Strong toured until August 2007, appeared on that year's Warped Tour and a package tour with From First to Last, Alesana and Vanna. Rise or Die Trying was released on September 18, 2007. In September and October, the group supported The Starting Line on their headlining US tour. In November and December, the band supported From First to Last on their headlining US tour. On December 1, a music video was released for "Heroes Get Remembered, Legends Never Die". From late January to early March 2008, the band supported Bayside on their tour of the US. The band supported the Starting Line on their headlining tour of the US in March and April, and appeared at the Give it a Name festival in the UK the following month. In July and August, the band performed on the 2008 edition of Warped Tour. In between dates on this tour, the band performed a handful of shows with other artists on Decaydance Records. On July 31, a music video was released for "Bada Bing! Wit' a Pipe!".

In September and October, the band went on a US tour with New Found Glory. Following this, the band went on a headlining West Coast and Midwest US tour with support from I Am the Avalanche, This Is Hell and A Loss for Words. In November, the band supported New Found Glory on their tour of the UK. "Bada Bing! Wit' a Pipe" was released as a single on November 23. In December, the band went on a brief holiday tour, titled Setting the Records Straight Tour alongside Set Your Goals, Every Avenue and Energy. Between mid-February and early April 2009, the band participated in the 2009 edition of Taste of Chaos. Following this, the band supported Bring Me the Horizon on their tour of Australia and New Zealand in May. In July, the band went on a tour of the US with Set Your Goals, Fireworks, the Swellers and Grave Maker. Further dates were added, extending the tour into late August.

== Reception ==
Professional ratings
Review scores
Source	Rating
AllMusic	3.5/5 stars
Ox-Fanzine	8/10
Punknews.org	2/5 stars

It chart at number 31 on the Billboard Heatseekers album charts in 2007. The album has sold over 50,000 copies.

== Track listing ==
=== Original release ===
All music written by Four Year Strong. All lyrics written by Alan Day and Dan O'Connor.

No.	Title	Length
1.	"The Take Over"	1:34
2.	"Prepare to Be Digitally Manipulated"	3:07
3.	"Abandon Ship or Abandon All Hope"	3:33
4.	"Heroes Get Remembered, Legends Never Die"	3:36
5.	"Wrecked 'Em? Damn Near Killed 'Em"	3:12
6.	"Catastrophe"	2:37
7.	"Men Are from Mars, Women Are from Hell"	3:06
8.	"Bada Bing! Wit' a Pipe!"	3:22
9.	"Beatdown in the Key of Happy"	3:03
10.	"If He's Here, Who's Runnin' Hell?"	3:18
11.	"Maniac (R.O.D.)"	3:08
Total length:		32:16

=== Bonus tracks ===
Australian & Japanese bonus track
No.	Title	Length
12.	"So Hot and You Sweat on It"	3:22

UK bonus tracks
No.	Title	Length
13.	"Beep Beep"	4:05
14.	"Gotta Get Out"	3:02

=== 10 Year Anniversary Edition ===
Bonus tracks
No.	Title	Length
12.	"So Hot, And You Sweat On It"	3:22
13.	"Gotta Get Out"	3:02
14.	"Not to Toot My Own Horn, But Beep Beep!"	4:05
15.	"Sparkle Motion"	3:10

== Personnel ==
Personnel per booklet.

Four Year Strong

- Alan Day – vocals, guitar
- Dan O'Connor – vocals, guitar
- Jake Massucco – drums
- Joe Weiss – bass guitar, backing vocals
- Josh Lyford – synth, unclean vocals

Additional musicians

- Mat Bruso – additional vocals on "Prepare to be Digitally Manipulated" and "Maniac (R.O.D.)"
- Four Year Strong – gang vocals
- Matt Robnett – gang vocals
- Brooks Plummer – gang vocals
- Nick Kanterelis – gang vocals

Production

- Matt Robnett – producer, engineer, mixing, mastering
- Nik Tyler – producer, engineer, mixing
- Rich King – assistant engineer, Pro Tools editing
- Alan Day – assistant engineer, Pro Tools editing
- Jake Caramanico – vocal tracking for Mat Bruso
- Greg Altman – guitar tones
- Brandon Ginsberg – drum tech
- Michael Bukowski – art, illustration
- Nick Arey – layout
- Kyle Holmquist – photography
- Dan O'Connor – logo, disc design
