= Ryan Scott Graham =

- Also known as: RSG, AdidasTrackPants 2.0, Enzo
- Born: Ryan Scott Graham; January 30, 1990 (age 36)
- Origin: Westland, Michigan
- Genres: Acoustic, soft rock, pop punk
- Occupation: Musician
- Instruments: Bass, vocals, guitar
- Label: Pure Noise Records

Ryan Scott Graham (born January 30, 1990, in Westland, Michigan) is the bassist/backing vocalist of New York pop-punk band State Champs. Ryan also has an acoustic solo project titled Speak Low If You Speak Love. Ryan is the former guitarist of Good Luck Varsity.

== Discography ==
=== The Dry Leaf Project ===
- "The Rap Song" (2007)
- For the Faithless and Forgiven (2008)
- Well Done, Good And Faithful Servant (2009)

=== Stab You in the Face ===
- "May Day" (2008)

=== Good Luck Varsity ===
- Liars & Thieves EP (2011)
- Thrones EP (2012)
- MTNS EP (2012)
- Foundations: 2007-2013 (2013)
- Curtains (2015)

=== Speak Low If You Speak Love ===
- Sad to Say EP (2011)
- NB/SLIYSL - Split (with Northbound) (2013)
- Everything But What You Need (2013, re-released 2015 on Pure Noise Records)
- Nearsighted (2018)

=== State Champs ===
- Around The World and Back (2015)
- Around The World and Back Deluxe (2017)
- Living Proof (2018)
- Unplugged (2020)
- Kings Of The New Age (2022)
- State Champs (2024)

=== Pile of Love ===
- Pile of Love (2021)

=== Being Around ===
- Volume One (2022)
