= Pure Noise Records =

American punk rock record label

- Founded: 2009
- Founder: Jake Round
- Distributors: The Orchard (current), Fontana (former), ADA (former)
- Genre: Punk rock
- Country of origin: United States
- Location: Nashville, Tennessee
- Official website: www.purenoise.net

Pure Noise Records is an American punk rock record label based in Nashville, Tennessee. It was founded by Jake Round in 2009 while he was an editor at AMP; the previous fall, friends of his in the band No Bragging Rights told him they were looking for a new label, and Round expressed interest in releasing the album himself. Prior to this Round had a short stint as an intern at Fat Wreck Chords. While the label began as a home operation, and had only put out five albums by the end of 2010, by 2014 some of the label's roster were main-stage acts at Warped Tour, and others had sold nearly 50,000 copies of their albums. Overall, the label's catalog had sold over 280,000 records as of March 2014. In March 2017, Pure Noise Records partnered with Sony Music to create a new music label called Weekday Records.

== History ==
Originally the label was called Pure Noise Entertainment and was supposed to become a pure concert agency, but Round decided to found a record company after two organized concert tours because he didn't see himself as a promoter of concerts. The first release was a CD of the US-American melodic hardcore band No Bragging Rights. Initially Round sent their demo to record companies hoping that a label would sign the band. When nothing materialized, he decided to produce the album himself. He asked his mother if she could give him money to produce a CD, which she agreed to. The resulting LP, The Consequence of Dreams, was the first album released by Pure Noise. Craig Ericson (founder of Rise Records) often advised Round during this beginning period.

From 2008 to 2010 the label operated as its own project and brought just five productions onto the market. In the meantime Pure Noise has signed two bands, Landscapes (England) and The Story So Far, among others, which have been able to achieve a higher degree of popularity. Landscapes toured Europe several times and The Story So Far's second album reached a chart position in the official Billboard charts. In 2014, The Story So Far played for the first time on the main stage of the Warped Tour and have sold almost 50,000 records of their album What You Don't See. With The Finer Things by State Champs (#131) and Angst by Handguns (#155), the label has released two more albums that have made it onto the official US Billboard 200. More than 280,000 records were sold worldwide in the first five years of the record company's existence. Round now shares an office with concert manager Brad Wiseman of the Soroka Agency.

== Artists ==
Gaffa aka Adam Stacey

Current

- 156/Silence
- '68
- Alex Melton
- The Amity Affliction
- Arm's Length
- Belmont
- Ben Quad
- The Bouncing Souls
- Can't Swim
- Chamber
- Church Tongue
- Cloud Nothings
- Counterparts
- Crime in Stereo
- Dollar Signs
- Drug Church
- The Early November
- Four Year Strong
- Just Friends
- Knocked Loose
- Knuckle Puck
- Koyo
- Less Than Jake
- Like Pacific
- Microwave
- New Found Glory
- Riley!
- Rosasharin
- Rotting Out
- Seahaven
- SeeYouSpaceCowboy
- Silent Planet
- Slow Crush
- Spanish Love Songs
- State Champs
- The Story So Far
- Strike Anywhere
- UnityTX
- UNWELL
- The Warriors

Former

- Born Without Bones
- Boston Manor
- Devon Kay & The Solutions
- First Blood
- Forever Came Calling
- Front Porch Step
- Gates
- Gnarwolves
- Handguns
- Hawthorne Heights
- Hit the Lights
- I Call Fives
- Landscapes
- Living with Lions
- Man Overboard
- Masked Intruder
- Meg & Dia
- Mint Green
- No Bragging Rights
- The Pink Spiders
- Prince Daddy & The Hyena
- Real Friends
- Reggie and the Full Effect
- Seaway
- Senses Fail
- Sharptooth
- Speak Low If You Speak Love
- The Spill Canvas
- Stick to Your Guns
- Terror
- To the Wind
- Vanna
- Violent Soho

== Bibliography ==
1. "Releases - Pure Noise Records". Pure Noise Records.
