= Gallows (Gallows album) =

Studio album by Gallows
- Released: 10 September 2012
- Recorded: April–May 2012
- Studios: Broadfields, Watford, England, UK
- Genre: Hardcore punk
- Length: 32:15
- Labels: Venn, Bridge Nine, Halfcut/Shock
- Producers: Steve Sears, Thomas Mitchener

Gallows chronology
Death Is Birth (2011)	Gallows (2012)	Desolation Sounds (2015)

Professional ratings
Aggregate scores
Source	Rating
Metacritic	77/100
Review scores
Source	Rating
AllMusic	4/5 stars
BBC Music	favourable
Consequence of Sound	3.5/5 stars
Drowned in Sound	9/10
The New Zealand Herald	4/5 stars
Sputnikmusic	4/5 stars
Under the Gun Review	8/10

Gallows is the third album by English hardcore punk band Gallows and the first full-length to feature new lead vocalist Wade Macneil, who replaced original frontman Frank Carter in August 2011, when Carter left to form new band Pure Love. It is also the last album to feature guitarist Steph Carter.

The album was produced, mixed and mastered by Spycatcher members Thomas Mitchener and Steve Sears at Watford's Broadfields Studio and was released on 10 September 2012 via the band's new label Venn Records in partnership with PIAS Recordings. The album was also released and distributed in the United States through Bridge Nine Records and in Australia and New Zealand through Halfcut Records/Shock Records.

It was also named the 9th best album of 2012 by Rock Sound.

== Track listing ==
No.	Title	Length
1.	"Victim Culture"	2:55
2.	"Everybody Loves You (When You're Dead)"	2:22
3.	"Last June"	2:46
4.	"Outsider Art"	3:22
5.	"Vapid Adolescent Blues"	3:04
6.	"Austere"	2:31
7.	"Depravers"	2:51
8.	"Odessa"	2.32
9.	"Nations" / "Never Enough"	3:34
10.	"Cult of Mary"	3:03
11.	"Cross of Lorraine"	3:12

iTunes edition bonus tracks
No.	Title	Length
12.	"We Bite" (originally performed by the Misfits)	1:19
13.	"Borstal Breakout" (originally performed by Sham 69)	2:16

== Personnel ==
- Wade Macneil – lead vocals
- Laurent "Lags" Barnard – guitar, backing vocals, keyboards
- Steph Carter – guitar, backing vocals
- Stuart Gili-Ross – bass, backing vocals
- Lee Barratt – drums, percussion
