= Haunts (band) =

British rock band (2006–2009)

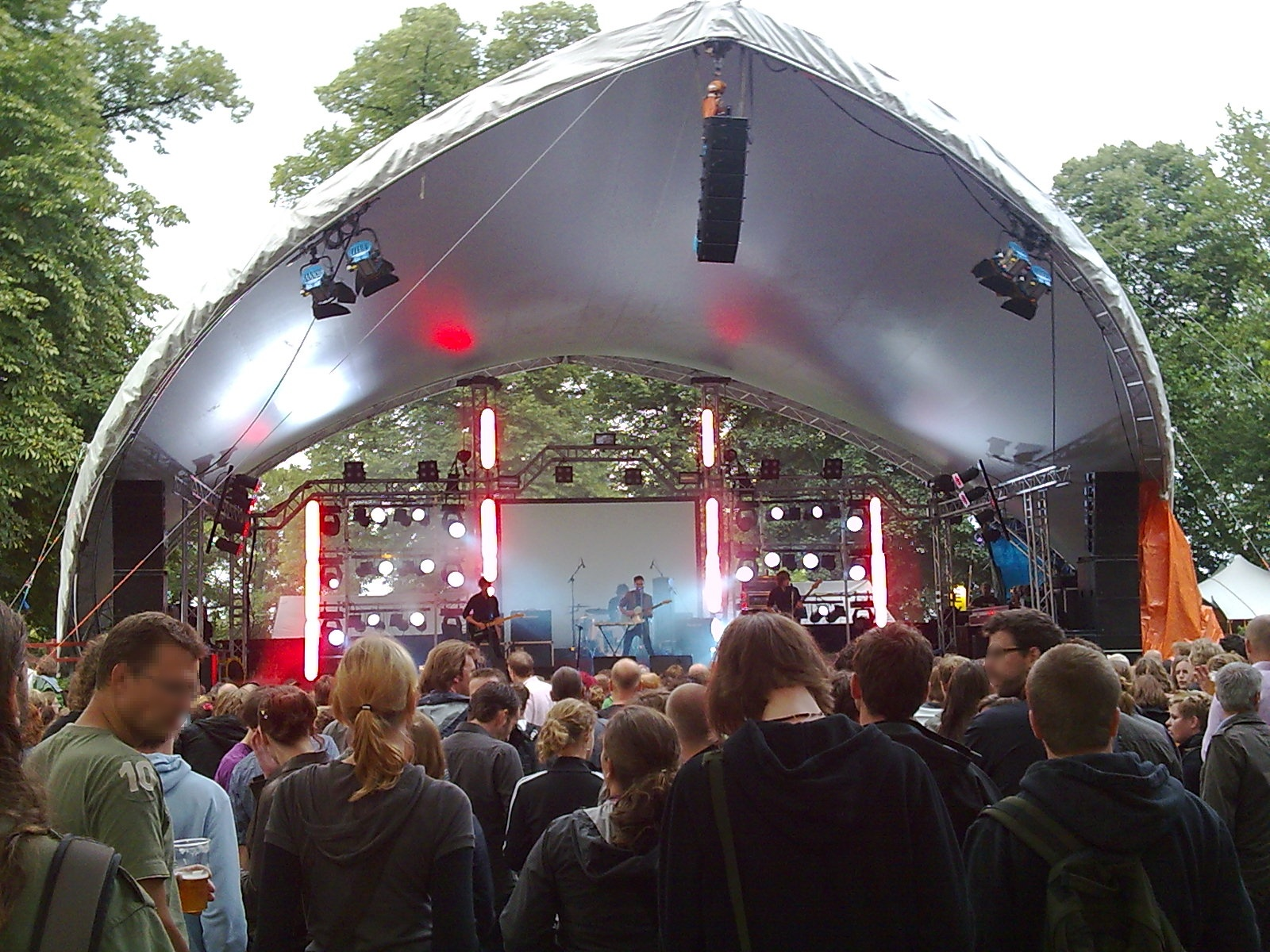
- Haunts live at de-Affaire festival, Nijmegen in July 2009

Background information
- Origin: Hertfordshire, England
- Genres: Indie rock, rock
- Years active: 2006–2009
- Label: Black
- Past members: Banks; Alex Woodcock; Gareth Grover; Mitch Mitchener
- Website: http://www.myspace.com/haunts http://www.myspace.com/hauntsremix

Haunts were a British rock band based in north London. Described as 'Noirists', their musical style combined elements of punk, new wave, dance, prog rock, indie and Britpop. The band referred to themselves simply as 'new wave'. Haunts' line-up consisted of Banks (vocals, guitar, synth), Alex Woodcock (guitar, backing vocals), Gareth Grover (drums, backing vocals) and Mitch Mitchener (bass guitar, backing vocals). Haunts disbanded in 2009.

== Early history ==
Haunts formed in late 2006. Shortly after posting a demo of the song "Bomz II Drop" online, they received a request from Welsh band Lostprophets to support them at a sold out 'secret' show at London's Scala on 26 April 2007. This was followed by tours with Switches, The Sunshine Underground and Funeral For a Friend, as well as many low-key dates at indie club nights in London. Haunts made their first festival appearance on 24 June 2007 at London's Hyde Park Calling festival, which was headlined by Aerosmith.

Haunts released their debut single, "Low Slung City Skyline" through Grand Recordings in September 2007 on 7" vinyl. The single was limited to 500 pieces and featured unusually elaborate packaging. All musical and design production was done by the band themselves, a work ethic they persevered with on subsequent releases (Woodcock is a graduate of Chelsea College of Art & Design; Banks was an up-and-coming record producer, having just produced Gallows' critically acclaimed debut album Orchestra of Wolves). The single won BBC Radio 1's 'Fresh Meat' competition hosted by DJ Zane Lowe. After the single's release Haunts toured extensively on the club NME circuit and with indie rock band Boy Kill Boy.

Haunts' second single, "Underground" was released in April 2008 through Black Records, again as a limited edition vinyl, this time a heavyweight blood-red disc with gatefold case, mirror-finish writing, and a glossy black outer sleeve. Again, Zane Lowe championed the single on his BBC Radio 1 show but this time the single was also picked up by XFM and other stations. The accompanying video clip also aired on MTV2. Appearances at London's Camden Crawl and Brighton's The Great Escape Festival also helped promote the single. On 13 June, Haunts headlined Club NME at London's KOKO. Other festival appearances in 2008 included Donington's Download, Scotland's T In The Park, Newquay's Boardmasters, Reading Festival, the Animal Windfest and the FS04 Freeze Festival at Battersea Power Station.

In August, Haunts released their third independent single, "Live Fast Die Young", as a limited edition 2-part 7" vinyl set comprising a coloured vinyl with gatefold sleeve and a picture disc. The release was supported by support slots with Lostprophets and The Automatic. Anticipating the imminent release of their debut album, October saw Haunts tour the UK as part of the 'No Half Measures Tour' which also featured The Holloways, Underground Heroes, Bear Hands and Regards. Near the end of the tour on 31 October, Haunts released the "London's Burning" EP. Unlike previous singles which were released both on limited 7 inch vinyl and iTunes, this EP was available exclusively in digital form via the 7digital music downloading service. The EP included a 'Halloween Remix' of "London's Burning" and a cover of Billy Idol's "White Wedding".

== Debut LP ==
Haunts released their eponymous debut album on 17 November through the independent label Black Records. Entirely self-produced and recorded in the band's own studio, the LP reinforced the band's DIY work ethic. The LP was mixed by Dan Weller and Justin Hill of WellerHill productions at their private studio in Old Street, London.

Haunts toured the UK and Europe extensively to promote the LP, both as a headline act and as a support band for White Lies and Eagles Of Death Metal. August saw the release of the "Love Is Blind" EP and a UK tour, with Sharks as main support. Haunts disbanded at some point in the months following the tour.

== Influences ==
Although the band were cagey about their personal influences, they were known to perform cover versions of songs by artists linked to the new wave genre such as Elvis Costello, Depeche Mode, The Cure, Devo, The Police and Talking Heads. Comparisons to other artists were erratic but included a diverse range of bands such as Talking Heads, Bauhaus, Queens of the Stone Age, Refused, Interpol, Franz Ferdinand and The Futureheads. Banks' distinctive deep, dry voice has been likened to Nick Cave and David Bowie.

== Discography ==
- "Low Slung City Skyline" / "Bag O' Bones" – September 2007
- "Underground" / "Low Slung City Skyline" (Haunts Remix) – April 2008
- "Live Fast Die Young" / "(I Don't Want To Go To) Chelsea" – August 2008
- "Live Fast Die Young" (Radio Edit)/ "Bomz II Drop" (Demo) – August 2008
- "London's Burning" EP - November 2008
- Haunts (Debut LP) – November 2008
- "Love Is Blind" EP - August 2009

== Remixes ==
Banks and Woodcock also remixed many tracks under the name 'Haunts'

- "Into Oblivion" – Funeral for a Friend
- "You're not Alone" – The Enemy
- "Low Slung City Skyline" – Haunts (B-side of 'Underground' single)
- "The Bears are Coming" – Late of the Pier
- "The Outsiders" – Athlete
- "Drugs" – The Music
- "Into The Galaxy" – Midnight Juggernauts
- "Crank It Up" - Hadouken!
- "Death" – White Lies
- "Move" – CSS
- "Radio Booth" - The Chemists
- "Crack the Shutters" - Snow Patrol
- "Tin Man" - Animal Kingdom
- "No Time For Tears" - The Enemy
- "Mowgli's Road" - Marina and the Diamonds
- "Grounds For Divorce" - Elbow
