= Pure Love (band) =

English-American rock band

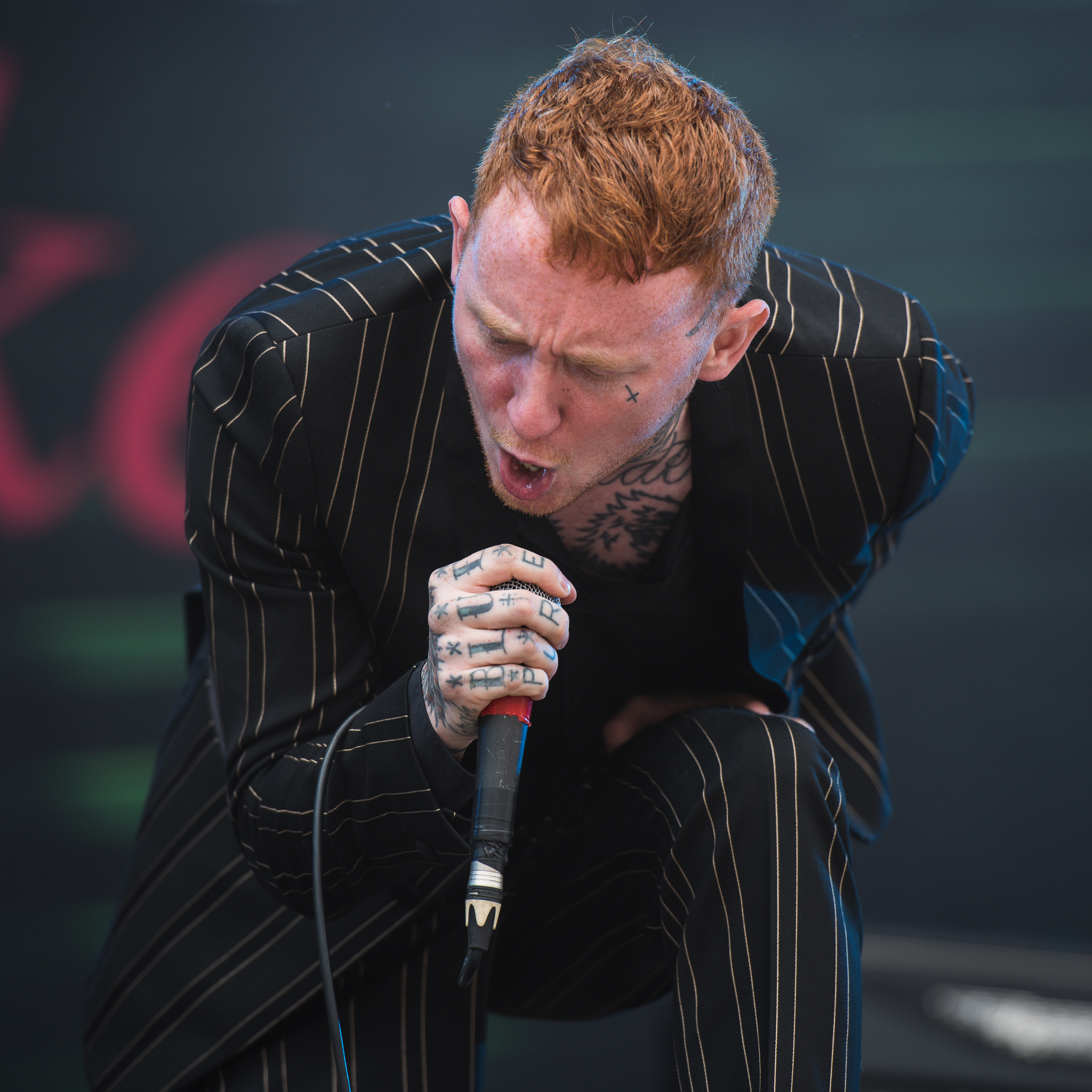
- Vocalist Frank Carter performing in 2017.

Background information
- Origin: London, UK and Brooklyn, New York, US
- Genres: Alternative rock, hard rock
- Years active: 2011–2014
- Labels: Vertigo, Mercury
- Spinoffs: Frank Carter and the Rattlesnakes
- Spinoff of: The Hope Conspiracy, Gallows, Suicide File
- Past members: Frank Carter; Jim Carroll
- Website: therealpurelove.com

Pure Love was an English-American rock band formed in 2011 by former Gallows frontman Frank Carter and ex-The Hope Conspiracy and Suicide File guitarist Jim Carroll, after Carter's departure from Gallows due to "creative differences". The band's musical style was a marked change from the hardcore punk backgrounds of the members.

== History ==
Frank Carter had made his name in the punk scene with the Hemel Hempstead/Watford-based band Gallows, who were known for their intense live shows. On the back of their success with debut album Orchestra of Wolves, the band signed a £1 million deal with Warner Bros. The deal lasted only 18 months before they were dropped, releasing just one album on the label: 2009's Grey Britain. Carter played his last show with Gallows in August 2011. Jim Carroll had played in numerous bands in his career, notably with The Hope Conspiracy and short-lived hardcore band The Suicide File.

Pure Love was formed in July 2011 after Frank Carter announced his departure from Gallows, with a "teaser" track posted that same month. On February 14, 2012, Pure Love played their first show at Bush Hall in London, during the NME Awards. An album is being recorded with Gil Norton producing. and is slated for a February 2013 release. The début single from the band, "Bury My Bones", was premièred on BBC Radio 1's Rock Show on April 24, 2012, and was made available for a free download. The next single, "Handsome Devils Club", was released at the end of May. A picture posted by the band on Instagram shows 11 track titles for the upcoming album: "Riot", "Beach of Diamonds", "The Hits", "Burning Love", "Handsome Devils Club", "March of Pilgrims", "Anthem", "Scared to Death", "Heavy Chains", "She", and "Bury My Bones". On February 7, 2014, the band announced, via Twitter, that they were going on an indefinite hiatus after some farewell shows in May. On April 16, 2014, The Bunny EP was released digitally on Bandcamp along with a Facebook message reading 'Today seems like a good day for some new music. Here are the last 3 songs we ever recorded!'.

Carter would go on to form Frank Carter & The Rattlesnakes, while Carroll would go on to play with American Nightmare and side project Spiral Heads with MGMT's Simon "Doom" O'Connor.

== Discography ==
Studio albums

- Anthems (2013)

Extended plays

- The Bunny (2014)

Singles

- "Bury My Bones" (2012)
- "Handsome Devils' Club" (2012)
- "Riot Song" (2012)
- "Beach of Diamonds" (2012)
