= Halfcut Records =

- Parent company: Shock Records
- Founded: 2012
- Distributor: Shock Records
- Genre: Heavy metal, hardcore punk, punk rock, rock
- Country of origin: Australia
- Location: Kew, Victoria, Australia
- Official website: halfcutrecords.com.au

Halfcut Records was launched in 2012 as an in-house label for Shock Records priority heavy music signings. The label is home to many popular punk, hardcore, and heavy music acts in Australia including Bring Me the Horizon, Millencolin, Alexisonfire, The Bronx, The Offspring, Cancer Bats, The Devil Wears Prada, Fall Out Boy and All That Remains.

Shock Records' GM of Music, Leigh Gruppetta had this to say. "Shock Records has meant many things over the years to people due to the company enjoying great success over a broad range of genres. The punk and heavy music genres are certainly an area we have excelled of late so we believe the time is right to give these bands their own home. Halfcut is the brainchild of Stu Harvey and under his watchful eye the Shock Records team will be pulling out all stops to continue this success. Stu is the best in his field, bar none, so we couldn’t be more excited about the long term future of Halfcut for the business."

As of 2019, the label's roster currently includes While She Sleeps, Gallows, Crossfaith, A Sight for Sewn Eyes, Auras, Belle Haven, Caulfield, Crystal Lake, Ritual and Thy Art Is Murder.

== Halfcut releases ==
Cat. #	Artist	Title	Format	Release date
SIAG001	While She Sleeps	This Is The Six	CD/DIGITAL	3 August 2012
SIAG002	Gallows	Gallows	CD/DIGITAL	14 September 2012
SIAG003	Heroes For Hire	No Apologies	CD/DIGITAL	28 September 2012
SIAG004	Crossfaith	Zion	CD/DIGITAL	10 August 2012
SIAG005	Thy Art Is Murder	Hate	CD/DIGITAL	19 October 2012
