= Anthems (Pure Love album) =

Studio album by Pure Love
- Released: February 4, 2013
- Genres: Alternative rock, garage rock, punk rock, hard rock
- Length: 36:39
- Labels: Vertigo, Mercury
- Producer: Gil Norton

Pure Love chronology
Handsome Devil's Club EP (2012)	Anthems (2013)

Singles from Anthems
- 1. "Bury My Bones" Released: April 24, 2012; 2. "Handsome Devil's Club" Released: May 30, 2012; 3. "Riot Song" Released: September 6, 2012; 4. "Beach of Diamonds" Released: December 6, 2012

Professional ratings
Aggregate scores
Source	Rating
Metacritic	66/100
Review scores
Source	Rating
AllMusic	3.5/5 stars
BBC	(Positive)
Classic Rock	3.5/5 stars
Drowned in Sound	7/10
NME	1/10
PopMatters	6/10
Punknews.org	4/5 stars
Sputnikmusic	4.5/5
Stereoboard	4.5/5 stars

Anthems is the only studio album by English-American rock band Pure Love, released February 4, 2013. The group formed in 2011 after the departure of lead singer Frank Carter from the hardcore punk band Gallows, after which he began sharing song ideas with Jim Carroll of The Hope Conspiracy and The Suicide File; the two had met when Gallows supported The Hope Conspiracy in 2006. The group signed to Vertigo Records in February 2012 and began working with producer Gil Norton, playing a number of new songs in their debut performance at the NME Awards that February. Prior to Anthem's release, the band debuted several songs online as music videos and downloads. The album was initially scheduled for release in October 2012 but was delayed to February 2013.

== Track listing ==
All tracks are written by Frank Carter and Jim Carroll.

No.	Title	Length
1.	"She (Makes the Devil Run Through Me)"	2:45
2.	"Bury My Bones"	2:48
3.	"The Hits"	3:30
4.	"Anthem"	4:33
5.	"Beach of Diamonds"	3:03
6.	"Handsome Devil's Club"	2:43
7.	"Heavy Kind of Chain"	3:18
8.	"Burning Love"	3:29
9.	"Scared to Death"	2:34
10.	"Riot Song"	3:28
11.	"March of the Pilgrims"	4:28

== Personnel ==
Pure Love

- Frank Carter – lead vocals
- Jim Carroll – guitars, backing vocals, scrap piano on Anthem

Session musicians

- Jol Mulholland – bass guitar
- Jared Shavelson – drums, percussion
- Oliver Edsforth – Hammond organ, piano, keyboards, sub bass synth
- Kate Orgias – violin on Heavy Kind of Chain
- Sarah Carter – additional vocals on Riot Song and March of the Pilgrims

Production

- Gil Norton – production, mixing, programming
- Dan Austin – engineering
- Brian Paul Lamotte – art direction, design
- Andreas Laszlo Konrath – photography
