= Godlike =

Godlike may refer to:

- Divine, having the characteristics of a deity
- Godlike (Natas album), 2002
- Godlike (Thy Art Is Murder album), 2023
- Godlike (role-playing game), an alternate history World War II era superhero role-playing game
- "Godlike" (song), a 1990 song by KMFDM
