= Desolation Sounds =

Studio album by Gallows
- Released: 13 April 2015
- Genres: Hardcore punk; post-punk; gothic rock
- Length: 35:31
- Labels: Bridge Nine, Venn, PIAS
- Producer: Steve Sears

Gallows chronology
Gallows (2012)	Desolation Sounds (2015)

Desolation Sounds is the fourth album by English hardcore punk band Gallows and the second full-length to feature vocalist Wade MacNeil, who replaced original frontman Frank Carter in August 2011.

The album is a departure from Gallows' fast-paced hardcore punk style, incorporating more post-punk and gothic rock influences.

== Reception ==
Professional ratings
Aggregate scores
Source	Rating
Metacritic	74/100
Review scores
Source	Rating
AllMusic	4/5 stars
Drowned in Sound	3.5/5 stars
Exclaim!	4/5 stars
Kerrang!	4/5 stars
NME	3.5/5 stars
Q	3/5 stars

The album received generally positive reviews.

== Track listing ==
No.	Title	Length
1.	"Mystic Death"	3:47
2.	"Desolation Sounds"	2:22
3.	"Leviathan Rot"	3:20
4.	"Chains (feat. Helena Coan)"	4:18
5.	"Bonfire Season"	3:30
6.	"Leather Crown"	4:22
7.	"93/93"	2:26
8.	"Death Valley Blue"	3:22
9.	"Cease to Exist"	4:20
10.	"Swan Song"	3:48

== Personnel ==
- Wade Macneil – lead vocals
- Laurent "Lags" Barnard – guitar, backing vocals, keyboards
- Stuart Gili-Ross – bass, backing vocals
- Lee Barratt – drums, percussion
