= Hate (Thy Art Is Murder album) =

Studio album by Thy Art Is Murder
- Released: 19 October 2012
- Recorded: April 2012
- Studios: Machine Shop Studios, Belleville, New Jersey
- Genre: Deathcore
- Length: 36:53
- Label: Halfcut
- Producers: Thy Art Is Murder; Will Putney

Thy Art Is Murder chronology
The Adversary (2010)	Hate (2012)	Holy War (2015)

Singles from Hate
- 1. "Reign of Darkness" Released: 19 September 2012

Hate is the second studio album by Australian deathcore band Thy Art Is Murder. The album was released on 19 October 2012, through Halfcut Records, but was reissued on 5 April 2013, through Nuclear Blast after the band signed to the label. The album debuted at no. 35 on the ARIA Charts, making Thy Art Is Murder the first extreme metal band ever to break the top 40. The album also reached no. 1 on AIR and peaked at 31 on the Top Heatseekers chart. On 31 March 2013, Metal Hammer began streaming the album in full, in anticipation of the Nuclear Blast re-release. It is the band's only album with guitarist Tom Brown, as well as the first album on which current guitarist Sean Delander plays bass.

== Musical style, writing, composition ==
AllMusic described the sound of the album as deathcore, as well as stating that the album is free of the cliches of the genre by noting that the group's focus is on "pushing the limits of intensity rather than just seeing how many breakdowns they can fit into a song" Exclaim! also noted the complexity of the music in comparison to other deathcore groups, describing the album's sound as a "harsh change from the simplistic sound popularized by Suicide Silence and their peers." Lyrically, the album has a harsh, misanthropic tone, and criticises a number of perceived aspects of modern life, from politics and religion to broader social issues and the environment. According to guitarist Sean Delander, "Tom and myself wrote a majority of the material, I moved up to his house and we wrote the songs over the course of 2 months. Tom would go to work and I would just sit around at his house drinking coffee, writing riffs and recording them the best way I could, then we would sit down together and work on the ideas that weren't terrible." He also explained that "We had about 5 days of preproduction with Will then drums were tracked. After that we did guitars, bass, and vocals all kind of at the same time, guitars in the day then vocals at night for the songs that were tracked. It ran really smooth and was an all round good time."

== Release, promotion, touring ==
Though the album was originally released on Halfcut Records on 19 October 2012, in January 2013 the band signed to Nuclear Blast Records, who reissued the album on 2 April in the United States and 5 April in Europe. The band headlined the "Hate Across America Tour" in November–December 2013 with I Declare War, Fit for an Autopsy, Kublai Khan, and The Last Ten Seconds of Life, which featured over 20 dates. The band also headlined a tour across Europe in January through February 2014 with Aversions Crown, Aegaeon, and Heart of a Coward. Music videos for the songs 'Reign of Darkness' and The Purest Strain of Hate' were released to promote the album.

== Critical reception ==
Professional ratings
Review scores
Source	Rating
AllMusic	3.5/5 stars
Decibel	1/10 stars
Exclaim!	(6/10)
Kill Your Stereo	80/100
Molten Magazine	4/5 stars
The Music	Positive
New Noise Magazine	3/5 stars

The album received mixed reviews from music critics, the more positive critiques of the album focused on the album's songwriting style, riffs and overall heaviness. AllMusic wrote that "although deathcore definitely isn't every metal purist's cup of tea, Thy Art Is Murder have a sound that's mercifully free of a lot of the clichés that plague the genre, and their focus on pushing the limits of intensity rather than just seeing how many breakdowns they can fit into a song makes them a band to watch out for."

Exclaim! and Decibel gave more critical and negative reviews of Hate. Exclaim! stated that the band were running "on creative fumes", and criticized the step down in technicality compared to The Adversary: "This leads songs such as 'Vile Creations' and 'Immolation' to chug themselves into early graves. Though the more stereotypical parts are often interrupted by brutal bombast, it's too little too late."

The album was nominated for the ARIA Award for Best Hard Rock or Heavy Metal Album in 2013.

== Track listing ==
All tracks are written by Thy Art Is Murder.

No.	Title	Length
1.	"Reign of Darkness"	3:35
2.	"The Purest Strain of Hate"	3:25
3.	"Vile Creations"	3:32
4.	"Shadow of Eternal Sin"	3:52
5.	"Immolation"	3:22
6.	"Infinite Forms"	4:32
7.	"Dead Sun" (featuring Nico Webers of War from a Harlots Mouth)	3:40
8.	"Gates of Misery"	2:55
9.	"Defective Breed"	3:40
10.	"Doomed from Birth" (featuring Joel Birch of The Amity Affliction)	4:24
Total length:		36:53

== Personnel ==
Production and performance credits are adapted from the album liner notes.

Thy Art Is Murder

- Chris "CJ" McMahon – lead vocals
- Andy Marsh – lead guitar
- Tom Brown – rhythm guitar
- Sean Delander – bass
- Lee Stanton – drums

Guest musicians

- Nico Webers (War from a Harlots Mouth) – vocals on "Dead Sun"
- Joel Birch (The Amity Affliction) – vocals on "Doomed From Birth"

Production

- Thy Art Is Murder – production
- Will Putney (Fit for an Autopsy) – production, engineering, mixing, mastering

Design and artwork

- Brent Elliott White – art, design

== Charts ==
Chart	Peak position
Australian Albums (ARIA)	35
US Heatseekers Albums (Billboard)	31
