= The Vulture (Acts I & II) =

Single by Gallows

from the album Grey Britain
- Released: 27 April 2009
- Recorded: 2009
- Genre: Hardcore punk
- Length: 2:56
- Label: Warner
- Producer(s): Gallows

Gallows singles chronology
"Gold Dust" (2008)	"The Vulture (Acts I & II)" (2009)	"London Is the Reason" (2009)

"The Vulture (Acts I & II)" is a song by the British hardcore punk band Gallows, released as the first single from their second album, Grey Britain.

Former Gallows frontman Frank Carter told Kerrang!: "I was thinking about all the forgotten children who die before their parents, and this song is about one of those poor bastards becoming Death's apprentice."

== Track listing ==
=== CD Version ===
1. The Vulture (Act II)

=== Digital version ===
1. The Vulture (Act II)
2. The Vulture (Acts I & II)

== Music video ==
The music video for "The Vulture (Acts I & II)" was released on 26 March 2009. It involves the band playing one scene in formal attire, integrated with another scene with the band stripped, covered in blood.
