= Holy War (Thy Art Is Murder album) =

Studio album by Thy Art Is Murder
- Released: 26 June 2015
- Recorded: 2014
- Genre: Deathcore
- Length: 38:38
- Labels: UNFD; Nuclear Blast
- Producer: Will Putney

Thy Art Is Murder chronology
Hate (2012)	Holy War (2015)	Dear Desolation (2017)

Uncensored cover

Holy War is the third studio album by Australian deathcore band Thy Art Is Murder. It was released on 26 June 2015 through UNFD and Nuclear Blast. The album was produced and mixed by Will Putney, recorded in late 2014. Music videos were released for the tracks "Light Bearer" on 29 May, and for "Holy War" on 29 June. Holy War had a successful first week of sales, charting at No. 7 in Australia and No. 82 in the U.S. as well as several other U.S. charts.

== Lyrical content ==
As opposed to previous albums, Holy War focuses on the subjects of child abuse, animal rights, religion, politics, and war.

== Cover art ==
It was revealed on 24 April, Thy Art had originally chosen a different cover artwork showing a child suicide bomber. After the original album cover was presented to distributors and retailers, the band was requested to either cover the artwork or choose a different design. The original artwork is within the packaging and printed on the vinyl cover.

Here it is [..], a child for every religion that has indoctrinated the young and disadvantaged, and sent them off to war and bloody death without cause or reason.

— Andy Marsh, explaining the meaning of the uncensored cover artwork

== Critical reception ==
Professional ratings
Review scores
Source	Rating
About.com	2.5/5 stars
Exclaim!	7/10
Metal Hammer	4/5
Rolling Stone Australia	4/5 stars
Ultimate Guitar	7.2/10

Holy War received mostly positive reviews from critics. Writing for Rolling Stone Australia, Sally McNullen gave the album four of five stars and described the album as "their darkest and most technically complex release yet," while noting that the band "don't stray too far from their sonic roots." Writing for Metal Hammer, Jason Hicks gave the album the same score. He wrote that in comparison to previous releases the band are "noticeably more focused and ferocious in their attack," concluding that "The end result is unquestionably Thy Art Is Murder's best release to date – one that undoubtedly cements their name among the best death metal bands out there today."

Bradly Zorgdrager's review for Exclaim! was similarly positive, awarding the album 7/10. He wrote that "Holy War carves finds a happy medium between the soul-sucking breakdowns of their last release and the eccentric pyrotechnics of their first. There are more emotions than merely the titular Hate of their last, and the soaring solos sound positively triumphant." However he criticised some aspects of the band's sound, finishing his review by noting that "Though the album could do without the all-too-clichéd ominous riffs over chugs – let's call them chugly passages – it's a small price to pay for this victory."

The album was included at number 18 on Rock Sound's top 50 releases of 2015 list.

== Track listing ==
All tracks are written by Thy Art Is Murder.

No.	Title	Length
1.	"Absolute Genocide"	4:25
2.	"Light Bearer"	3:55
3.	"Holy War"	4:00
4.	"Coffin Dragger" (featuring Winston McCall of Parkway Drive)	2:55
5.	"Fur and Claw"	4:16
6.	"Deliver Us to Evil"	3:06
7.	"Emptiness"	4:03
8.	"Violent Reckoning"	2:55
9.	"Child of Sorrow"	3:33
10.	"Naked and Cold"	5:30
Total length:		38:38

Initial CD pressing/Vinyl bonus track
No.	Title	Length
11.	"Vengeance"	2:23
Total length:		41:01

== Credits ==
Writing, performance and production credits are adapted from the album liner notes.

Personnel

Thy Art Is Murder

- Chris "CJ" McMahon – vocals
- Andy Marsh – lead guitar
- Sean Delander – bass, rhythm guitar
- Lee Stanton – drums

Guest musicians

- Winston McCall of Parkway Drive – vocals on "Coffin Dragger"

Production

- Will Putney – production, engineering, mixing
- Randy Leboeuf – additional engineering
- Steve Seid – editing
- Tom Smith Jr. – editing
- Ted Jensen – mastering

Design and artwork

- Andy Marsh – art direction
- Thomas Savage – photography
- Sebastian Lux – design, layout
- Musician known as R%

Studios

- Graphic Nature Audio, Belleville, NJ, U.S. – recording, mixing
- Sterling Sound, New York City, NY, U.S. – mastering

== Charts ==
Chart	Peak position
Australian Albums (ARIA)	7
German Albums (Offizielle Top 100)	70
UK Independent Albums (Official Charts)	22
UK Rock & Metal Albums (Official Charts)	10
US Billboard 200	82
US Top Hard Rock Albums (Billboard)	3
US Top Rock Albums (Billboard)	14
US Indie Store Album Sales (Billboard)	17

== Release history ==
Date	Region	Label
26 June 2015	Australia, New Zealand	UNFD
26 June 2015	Europe	Nuclear Blast
29 June 2015	UK	Nuclear Blast
30 June 2015	North America	Nuclear Blast
