= Thy Art Is Murder =

Australian deathcore band

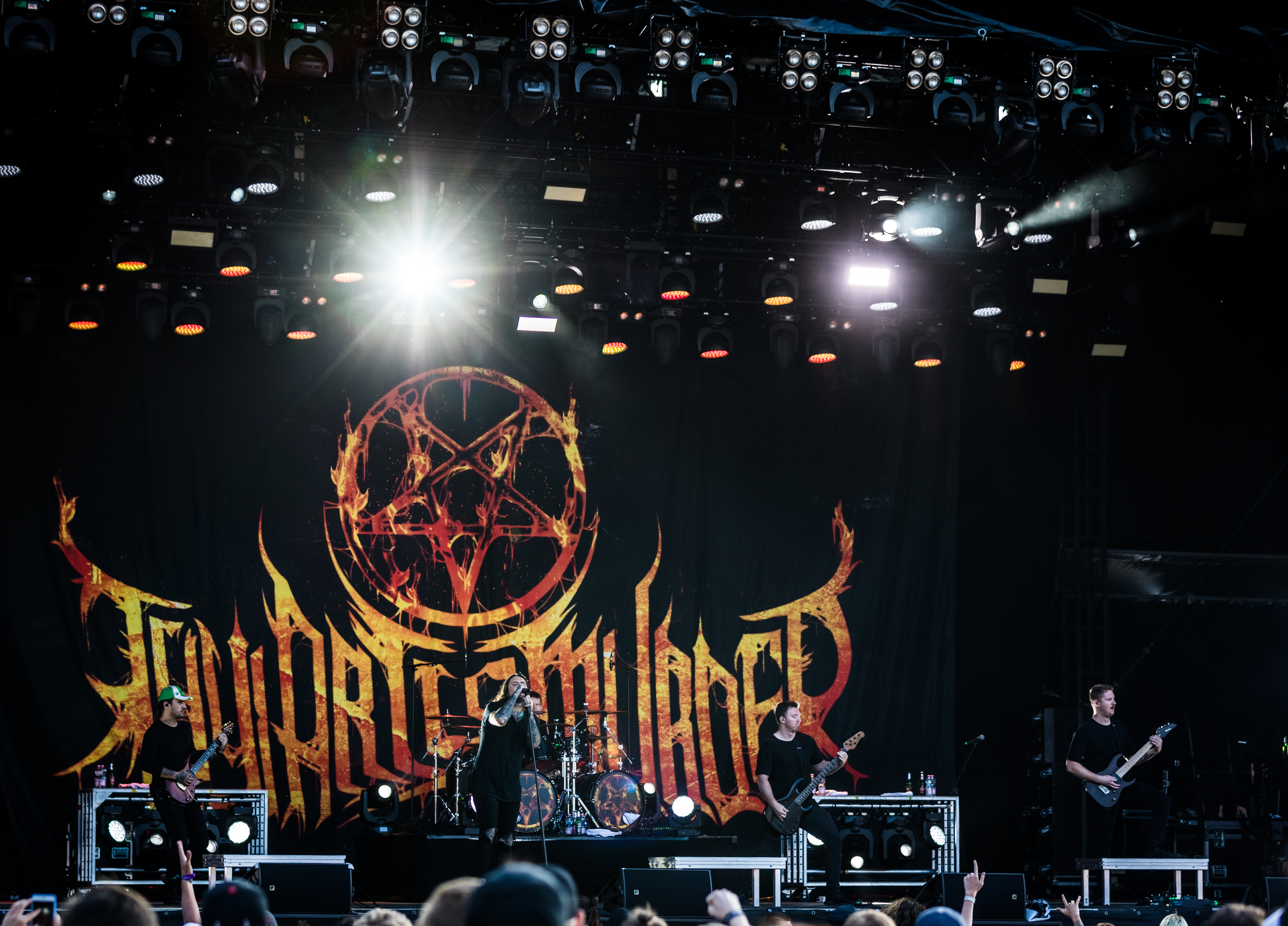
- Thy Art Is Murder performing at Rock am Ring in 2018

Background information
- Origin: Blacktown, Sydney, New South Wales, Australia
- Genre: Deathcore
- Years active: 2006–present
- Labels: Human Warfare; Nuclear Blast; Halfcut; Skulls and Bones; UNFD
- Members: Sean Delander; Andy Marsh; Kevin Butler; Jesse Beahler; Jerry Grimefeld
- Past members: Brendan van Ryn; Josh King; Mick Low; Gary Markowski; Tom Brown; Lee Stanton; Chris "CJ" McMahon; Tyler Miller
- Website: thyartismurder.net

Thy Art Is Murder is an Australian deathcore band from Blacktown, Sydney, that formed in 2006. The band consists of vocalist Jerry Grimefeld, guitarists Sean Delander and Andy Marsh, bassist Kevin Butler and drummer Jesse Beahler. Thy Art Is Murder has released six studio albums since formation.

Their 2008 EP Infinite Death, reached position no. 10 on the AIR Charts upon release, and their second full-length album Hate debuted at no. 35 on the ARIA Charts, making them the first extreme metal band to ever reach the Top 40 of this chart. The album also reached no. 1 on AIR and both no. 2 and no. 4 respectively on the US and Canadian iTunes metal charts on its week of release.

The band's following albums Holy War (June 2015) and Dear Desolation (August 2017) charted on US Billboard 200. Human Target was released in July 2019. Their most recent album, Godlike, was released in September 2023.

Loudwire designated Thy Art is Murder as being among deathcore's "Big Four", along with Whitechapel, Suicide Silence and Job for a Cowboy.

== History ==
=== 2006–2008: Formation, demo and Infinite Death EP ===
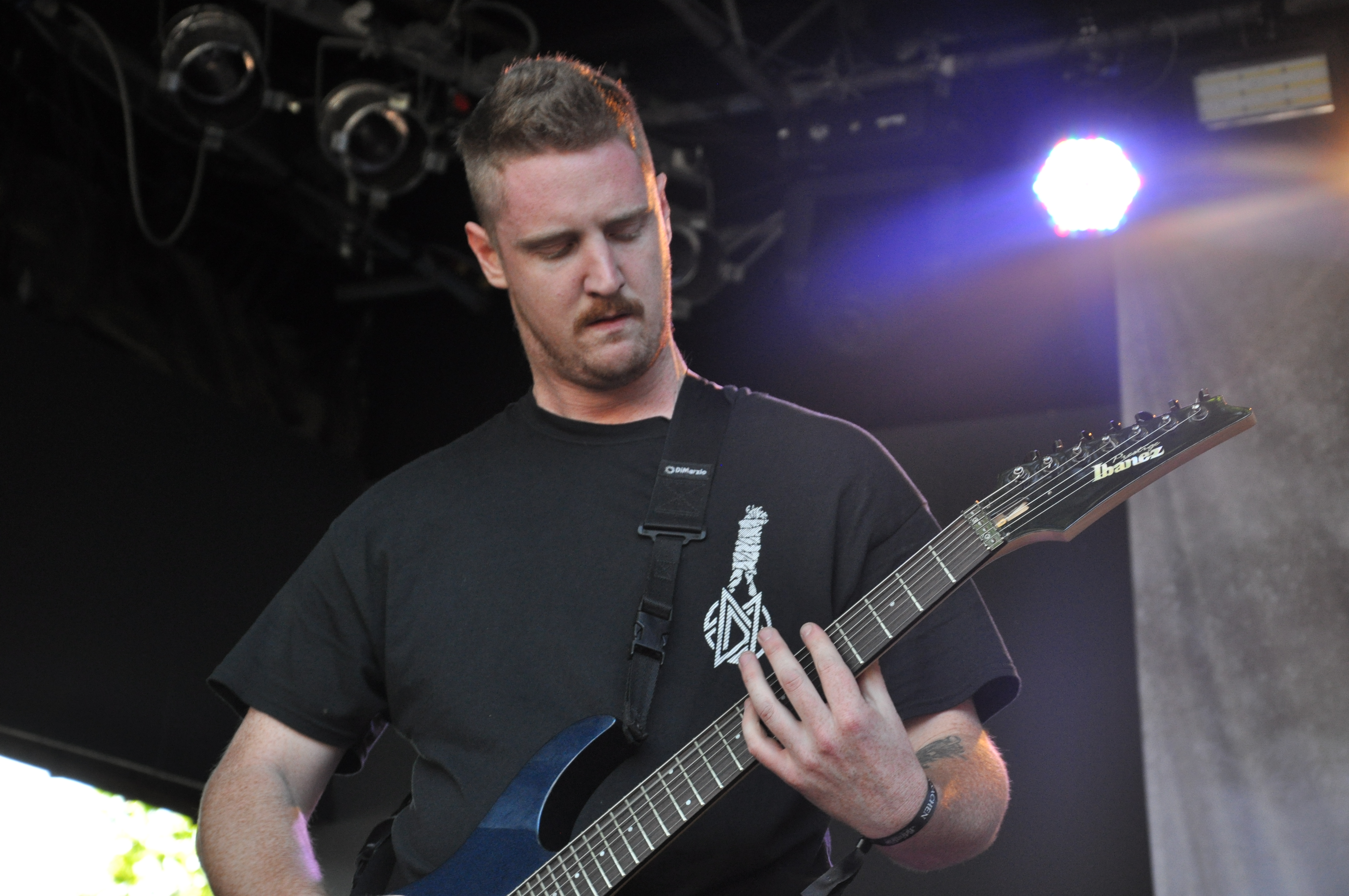
Founding member and guitarist Sean Delander

Formed in 2006, in the Western Sydney locality of Blacktown, the group originally consisted of vocalist Brendan van Ryn, guitarists Gary Markowski and Sean Delander, bassist Josh King, and drummer Lee Stanton. Most members were around 15 years old at the time.

In 2007 they released their first demo, the three track This Hole Isn't Deep Enough for the Twelve of You, and began playing local shows. They quickly gained a loyal fanbase among local deathcore fans in Western Sydney due to their highly energetic performances, and went on to independently tour the east coast of Australia.

After touring they returned to the studio to record their first EP Infinite Death, of which all lyrics were written by Brendan van Ryn after the instrumentals were recorded. Infinite Death was released in 2008 via Shock and subsequently Skull And Bones Records.

The Infinite Death EP was also published on the band's official Myspace page, leading an explosion of popularity around the world. The album gained notoriety due to the technical nature of their deathcore sound, and also their sacrilegious and misogynistic lyrics. The EP reached number 10 on the AIR Charts.

=== 2008–2010: Line-up changes and The Adversary ===
Following the breakout release of Infinite Death and two years of relentless national touring, it was announced in 2008 that van Ryn was departing from the group. It was initially claimed that he left the group due to creative differences, namely guitarist Gary Markowski stating that his voice didn't fit into the band's later, more death metal-inspired sound. However, vocalist McMahon, van Ryn's successor, explained in a 2013 interview that he was removed because "he couldn't sing [anymore] and he had a massive attitude problem."

Thy Art Is Murder searched for a year for a new vocalist, until finding Chris "CJ" McMahon from Sydney metalcore band Vegas in Ruins. The band were so impressed with his death growl vocals that he was incepted into the band during 2009.

Bassist Mick Lowe replaced King shortly before the band began tracking demos for their first full-length album The Adversary. The demos recorded in 2009 included early versions of the songs "Engineering the Antichrist" and "Cowards Throne". In 2010, the group began recording the album's final recording sessions and released the album on 16 July 2010.

Thy Art Is Murder supported the release of The Adversary with Canadian deathcore band Despised Icon's Australian leg of their Farewell Tour, which also included The Red Shore.

=== 2010–2014: Hate ===
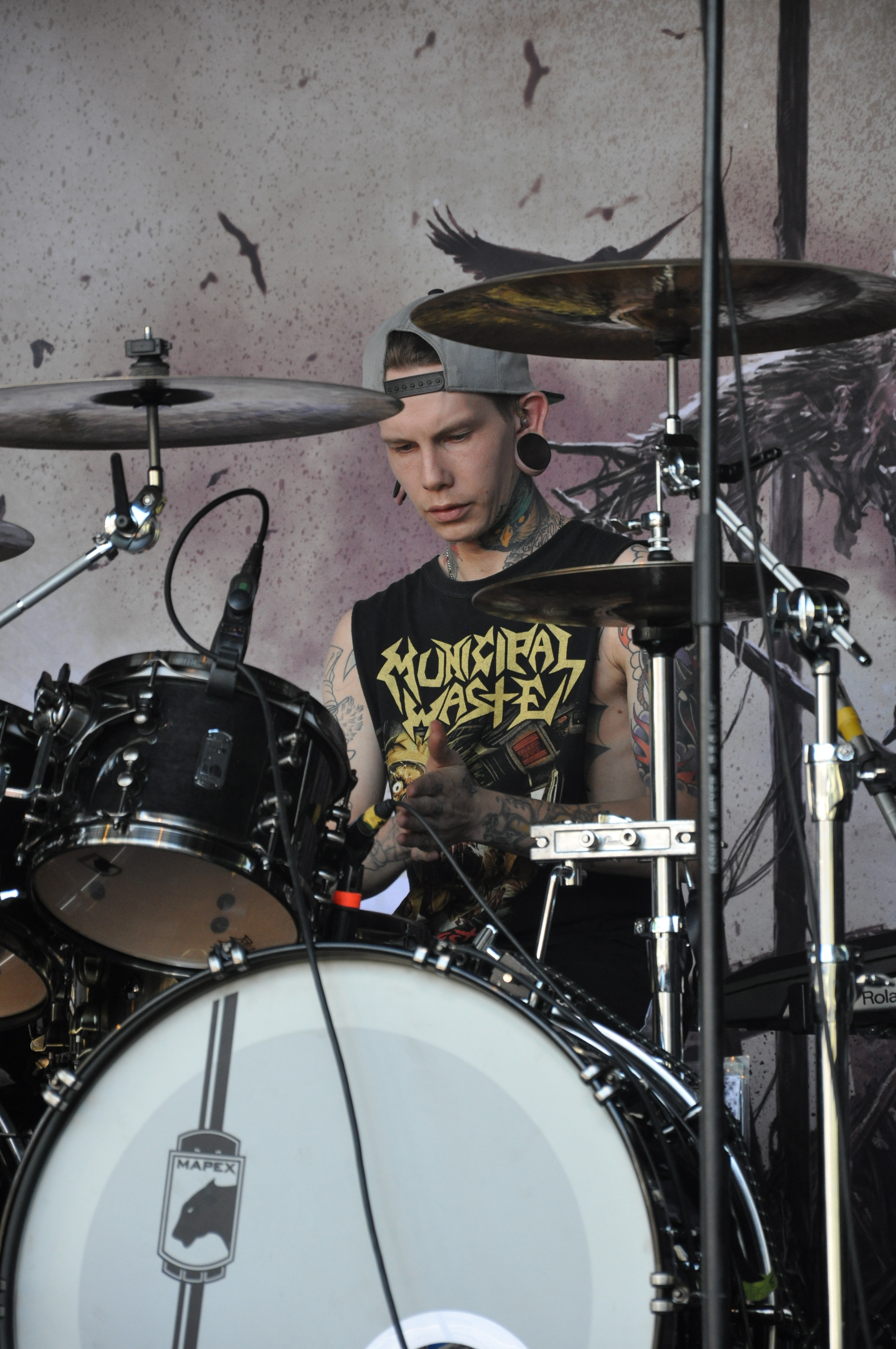
Founding member and former drummer Lee Stanton

Late 2010 saw further line-up changes, notably the dismissal of founding member and lead guitarist Gary Markowski due to allegedly stealing from the rest of the band members. Delander decided to switch duties from guitar to bass, making way for Andy Marsh and Tom Brown to join on guitar. Following the band's first European tour in 2012 with War from a Harlots Mouth and As Blood Runs Black the band traveled to Belleville, NJ in the United States to record their second album with producer Will Putney at the Machine Shop recording studios.

Following their Australian tour with Fear Factory in September 2012, Hate was released on 19 October 2012. The first single, "Reign of Darkness", had been premiered earlier on radio station Triple J's The Racket on 18 September.

The album debuted at No. 35 on the ARIA Charts, making Thy Art Is Murder the first extreme metal band to ever to break the top 40. The album also reached No. 1 on AIR. The album was met with a mix of some positive and some negative criticism. Kevin Stewart-Panko of Decibel Magazine awarded Hate a score of 1 out of 10 and criticizing the band for not going "out of their way to push the envelope or add a modicum of originality or value to metal as a whole." In January 2013, the band performed at the Sydney Big Day Out festival; the only other extreme metal band ever to be featured on the line-up was Blood Duster in 2004. Following their second European tour in February and March Thy Art Is Murder signed to Nuclear Blast on 24 January 2013 for distribution of Hate outside Australia. On 13 March 2013, Triple J announced that Thy Art Is Murder would be headlining the Hate Across Australia tour with Cattle Decapitation, King Parrot and Aversions Crown.

On 11 April 2013, Sumerian Records officially announced that the group had just lost the opening support on the United States' annual Summer Slaughter Tour. The announcement was met by some controversy due to the fact that the group was to be chosen by a voters' poll and American deathcore band Rings of Saturn had in fact won the vote by 1%. Eventually, promoters chose to include both bands.

On 17 June 2013 the band revealed they would be touring across Australia with Parkway Drive as part of their 10 Years of Parkway Drive tour. The same day, the band lost out to Bleed from Within at the Metal Hammer Golden Gods Awards where they had been nominated as Best New Band. On 15 October 2013 the band were nominated in the Best Hard Rock/Heavy Metal category for the 2013 ARIA Awards, eventually losing out to Karnivool. The band headlined their second ever tour through North America in November and December 2013, dubbing it the Hate Across America. The bill featured support from I Declare War, Fit for an Autopsy, The Last Ten Seconds of Life and Kublai Khan with many dates selling out. The band headlined in Europe in January and February 2014, selling out most venues. Support came from Heart of a Coward, Aversions Crown and Aegaeon. The band was announced on the lineup for Download Festival 2014.

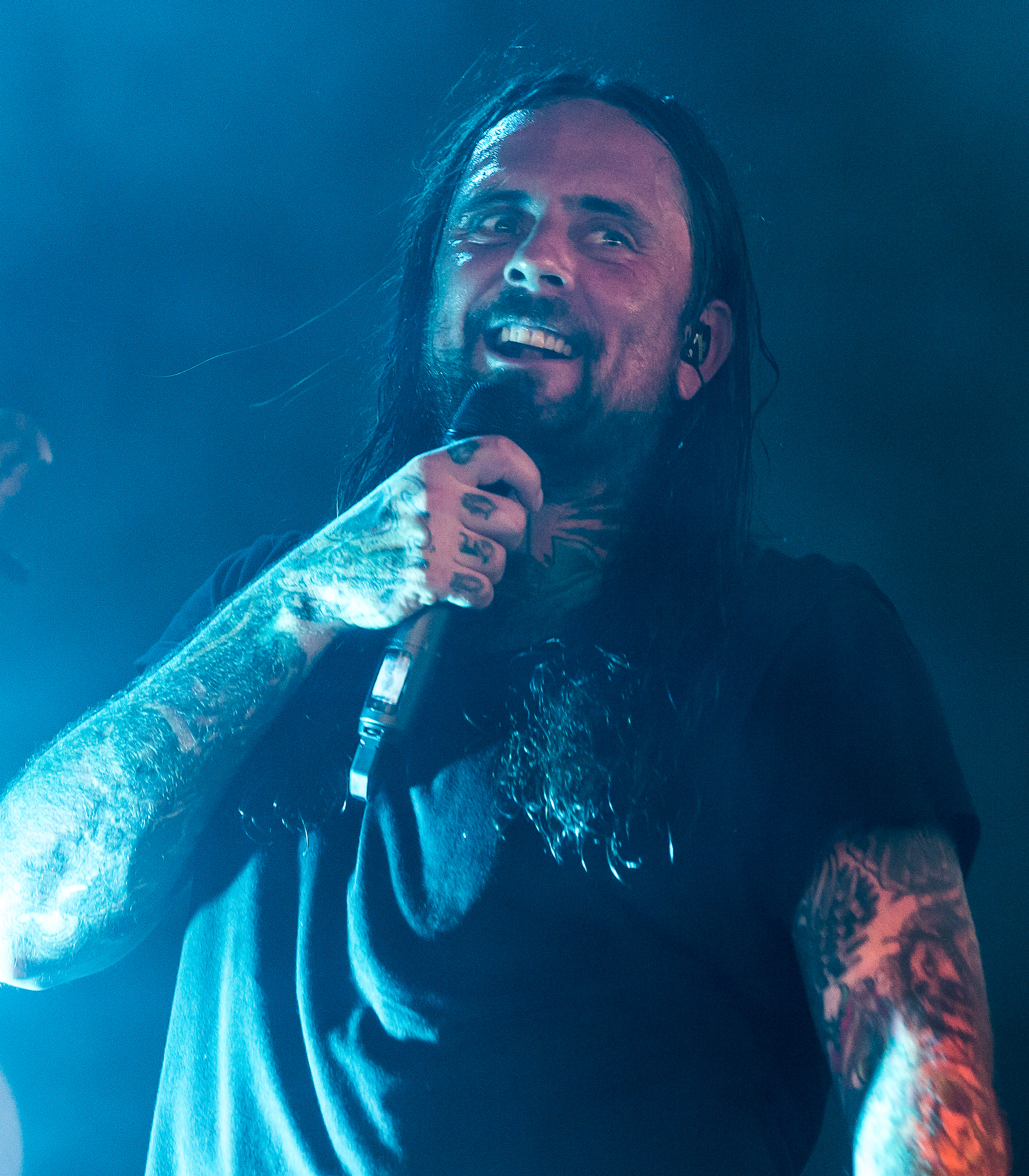
Former vocalist Chris "CJ" McMahon

The band made Australian news headlines in late February 2014, when McMahon encouraged fans to get onstage during their set on Brisbane leg of the Soundwave Festival tour. Promoter AJ Maddah later tweeted his decision to take the band off the rest of the tour calling them "disrespectful arseholes" and claiming that McMahon had told the crowd that "there are thousand of you and dozens of security. Smash them. All of you get on the stage". Fan footage uploaded on YouTube revealed that Maddah's version of McMahon's pre-song speech were embellished. The following day both the promoter and the band tweeted that Thy Art Is Murder would be allowed to play the remainder of the tour. McMahon later commented on the incident, saying "it's just all bullshit... I just wanted the crowd participation, wanted people to try and make their way up on-stage and have a crazy show"; however, he also expressed positive feelings to the aftermath as he felt the coverage of the incident gave the band free publicity.

The band announced their participation in the Mosh Lives tour, headlined by Emmure, travelling the US in March and April 2014. The band headlined a short Canadian tour with Sworn In in April 2014. The band played New England Metal And Hardcore Festival in April 2014. The band also took part at the Summer Slaughter the same year. Vocalist CJ McMahon commented on the band's activity, claiming they are "one of, if not the most hardest-working touring bands" and saying that "[there's] no other fucking band on the face of this earth that will tour as much as we do". They also supported Born of Osiris on their Tomorrow We Die Alive tour in November 2014 in North America with ERRA, Within the Ruins and Betraying the Martyrs.

=== 2015–2018: Holy War and Dear Desolation ===
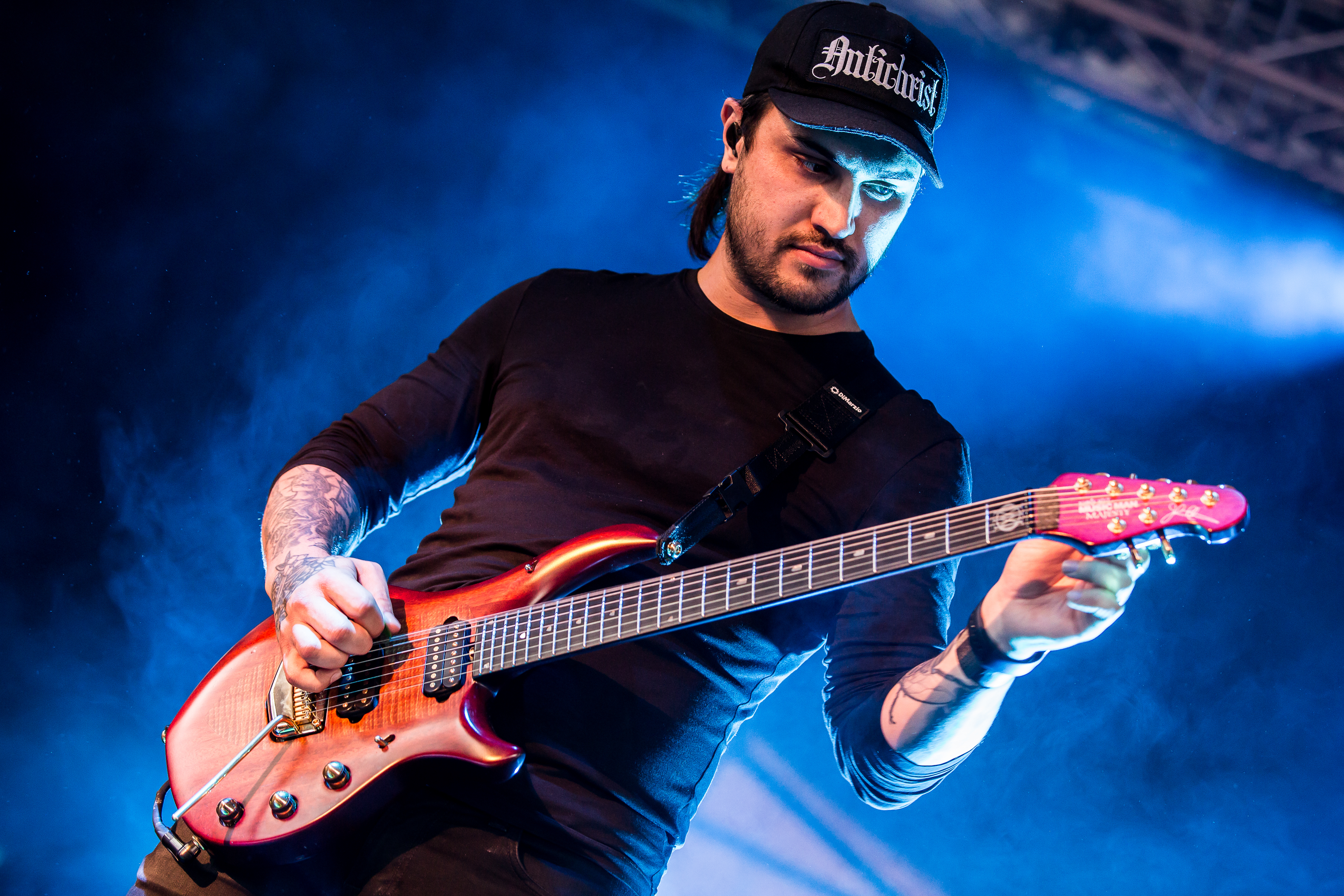
Guitarist Andy Marsh

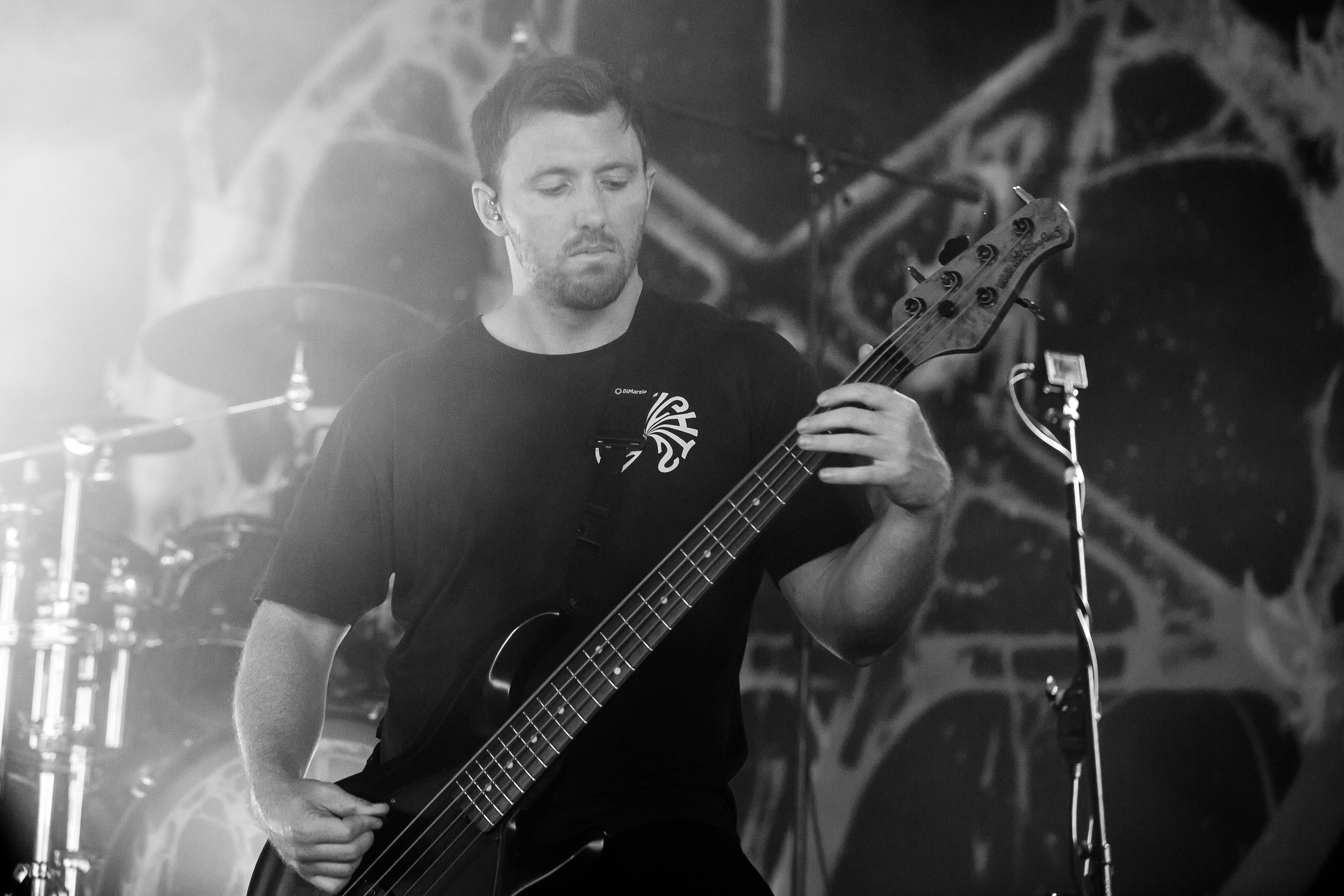
Kevin Butler in 2018

On 31 March 2015 it was announced that Thy Art Is Murder's then-upcoming album would be titled Holy War and would be released on 30 June in North America via Nuclear Blast Entertainment. It was recorded in secret over the winter with producer Will Putney. Thy Art Is Murder, alongside other bands, supported Slayer on 2015's Mayhem Festival, which toured the U.S. from June to August. Holy War had a successful first week of sales, charting at No. 7 in Australia and No. 82 in the U.S., making them the first Australian extreme metal band to chart.

They supported Parkway Drive on all of their worldwide tour in support of Ire through 2015 and 2016. The band announced on 21 December 2015, that vocalist CJ McMahon had decided to leave the band to focus on his family due to his inability to afford touring. After some teaser posters, in 1 July, the band confirmed work on a split album titled The Depression Sessions shared with the deathcore bands Fit for an Autopsy and The Acacia Strain. It was released exclusively on vinyl. The same day, the band premiered a music video for the song "They Will Know Another" from the album. In 2016, guitarist Sean Delander filled in for the late Tom Searle on the Architects Australian tour.

On 14 January 2017, former vocalist McMahon rejoined the band onstage at Unify Festival in Tarwin Meadows, Victoria, where he confirmed his return to the group, and that the show was for the fans a "celebration that is me coming back to join my brothers in world domination." The band released their fourth studio album, titled Dear Desolation, on 18 August 2017.

In an interview in October 2017, guitarist Andy Marsh confirmed that if McMahon had not returned, they would've recorded Dear Desolation with their at the time fill-in vocalist, Nick Arthur (of Molotov Solution). In the same interview, he also shared that the band had started planning a new split EP to follow-up 2016's The Depression Sessions.

=== 2019–2026: Human Target, Godlike and McMahon's dismissal ===
On 1 April 2019 it was revealed longtime drummer Lee Stanton had departed the band and their fill-in, Jesse Beahler of the American death metal band Jungle Rot, had taken his place full-time. On 26 April 2019, the band revealed their new album would be titled Human Target, and released the title track as its lead single. The album was released on 26 July 2019 through Nuclear Blast Records.

On 30 October 2020, the band released a single titled "Killing Season", which guitarist Andy Marsh explained was about Thanksgiving, adding: "While that subject is relevant at this time of year, we want you to think of the atrocities both past and present that deserve acknowledgement."

On 9 May 2023, the band published the lead single "Join Me in Armageddon" and an accompanying music video. At the same time, they officially announced that their sixth studio album, Godlike, was set for release on 15 September 2023, whilst also revealing the album cover and the track list. On 11 July, the band unveiled the second single "Keres" and its corresponding music video. On 15 August, one month before the album release, the band released the third single "Blood Throne" along with a music video. On 12 September, due to the production delays, the band announced that they had pushed back the release of the album to 22 September.

On 23 September, one day after the release of Godlike, Thy Art Is Murder revealed on social media that they fired vocalist CJ McMahon without his knowledge. The album featured re-recorded vocals from a then-unknown vocalist with McMahon being removed from the album. McMahon was only made aware of his removal after the band released a statement, indicating that the band had made the decision to replace McMahon's vocals while he was still in the band. According to a statement from the band, the split was partially due to McMahon's "recent anti-trans comments", which they noted were "a symptom of a larger problem". On 27 September, the band announced that they had recruited Tyler Miller of Aversions Crown as their new full-time vocalist, and revealed that it was his vocals on the updated version of Godlike. On November 5, 2024, the band released the single "Through Blood I Purify”.

In 2026, the band began performing with a new lead vocalist, former Honest Crooks frontman Jerry Chard – aka Jerry Grimefeld. In November 2026, the band released "Squeeze", their first single with Chard as lead vocalist.

== Musical style and influences ==
Thy Art is Murder's music has been described by music critics as deathcore, which draws from both metalcore and death metal. Their themes often cover dystopian savagery, violence and strife. The band's album, Hate, expresses dislike of organized religion. The band's third full-length album, Holy War, discusses a range of themes, from their anti-religion and anti-extremism to animal rights, war, and greed. The 2023 album Godlike shows the band increasing their blackened death metal quotient.

The band's lyrics have been described as being "not safe for work".

Former vocalist CJ McMahon mentioned in interviews with Bluestribute TV and Aggressive Tendencies that the band members, individually, have different inspirations that influence their writing and performance style. He added that the band all together are influenced by Decapitated, Gojira, Meshuggah, and Behemoth. The band have frequently cited Behemoth as a major influence on their style whom McMahon has referred to as "the best band on this planet." Guitarist Andy Marsh has said that "We are big fans of music that can evoke a feeling and mood, but often that music isn't very in your face and heavy. Behemoth are amazing at capturing that synergy in just the right way and it is that ethos that inspires us."

== Band members ==
Current

- Sean Delander – rhythm guitar (2006–2010, 2015–present); bass (2010–2015)
- Andy Marsh – lead guitar (2010–present)
- Kevin Butler – bass (2015–present)
- Jesse Beahler – drums (2019–present; touring musician 2015–2016)
- Jerry Chard (aka Jerry Grimefeld) – vocals (2026–present)

Former

- Brendan van Ryn – vocals (2006–2008)
- Josh King – bass (2006–2009)
- Mick Low – bass (2009–2010)
- Gary Markowski – lead guitar (2006–2010)
- Tom Brown – rhythm guitar (2011–2013)
- Lee Stanton – drums (2006–2015, 2016–2019)
- Chris "CJ" McMahon – vocals (2009–2015, 2017–2023)
- Tyler Miller – vocals (2023–2026)

Touring

- José "TTS" Manuel – vocals (2013; substitute for CJ McMahon)
- Alexandro Hernández – vocals (2013; substitute for CJ McMahon)
- Roman Koester – rhythm guitar (2013–2014)
- Wes Hauch – rhythm guitar (2014)
- Monte Barnard – vocals (2016)
- Lochlan Watt – vocals (2016)
- Mike Mulholland – rhythm guitar (2018; substitute for Sean Delander)
- Nick Arthur – vocals (2015–2016, 2016–2017, 2019)
- Bobak Rafiee – vocals (2022; substitute for CJ McMahon)

== Discography ==
Thy Art Is Murder discography
- Studio albums: 6
- Extended plays: 3
- Music videos: 16
- Demos: 1

Studio albums

List of studio albums, with selected chart positions
Title	Album details	Peak chart positions		
Title	Album details	AUS	GER	US
The Adversary	Released: 16 July 2010; Label: Skull and Bones	—	—	—
Hate	Released: 18 October 2012; Label: Halfcut, Distort, Nuclear Blast Records	35	—	—
Holy War	Released: 26 June 2015; Label: UNFD, Nuclear Blast	7	70	82
Dear Desolation	Released: 18 August 2017; Label: Nuclear Blast	5	29	95
Human Target	Released: 26 July 2019; Label: Nuclear Blast	11	16	—
Godlike	Released: 22 September 2023; Label: Human Warfare	31	—	—
"—" denotes a recording that did not chart or was not released in that territory.

EPs

Title	Details	Peak chart positions
Title	Details	AUS
Infinite Death	Released: 2 August 2008; Label: Skull and Bones	— (Note: Infinite Death did not enter the ARIA Singles Chart, but peaked at number 31 on the ARIA Physical Singles Chart.)
The Depression Sessions (split with The Acacia Strain and Fit for an Autopsy)	Released: 12 August 2016; Label: Nuclear Blast	38
The Aggression Sessions (split with Fit for an Autopsy and Malevolence)	Released: 7 April 2023; Label: Nuclear Blast	—

Demos

Title	Details
This Hole Isn't Deep Enough for the Twelve of You	Released: 2007; Label: Independent

Guest appearances

Year	Title	Lead artist	Album
2019	"We Are The Free"	PhaseOne	TRANSCENDENCY

Music videos

List of music videos, showing year released and director
Year	Title	Album	Director(s)
2010	"Soldiers of Immortality"	The Adversary	D.O. Blackley, Steve Callanan
2012	"Reign of Darkness"	Hate	Chris Elder
2013	"The Purest Strain of Hate"	Hate	Savage Photo / Film
2015	"Light Bearer"	Holy War	Yves Otterbach
2015	"Holy War"	Holy War	Unknown
2016	"They Will Know Another"	The Depression Sessions	Unknown
2017	"No Absolution"	Non-album single	Unknown
2017	"Slaves Beyond Death"	Dear Desolation	Red Boss Productions
2017	"The Son of Misery"	Dear Desolation	Thomas Savage
2019	"Human Target"	Human Target	Thomas Savage
2019	"Death Squad Anthem"	Human Target	Wilson Bambrick
2019	"Make America Hate Again"	Human Target	Max Moore
2019	"New Gods"	Human Target	Elder
2023	"Join Me in Armageddon"	Godlike	Third Eye Visuals
2023	"Keres"	Godlike	Third Eye Visuals
2023	"Blood Throne"	Godlike	Third Eye Visuals

== Awards and nominations ==
=== ARIA Music Awards ===
The ARIA Music Awards are a set of annual ceremonies presented by Australian Recording Industry Association (ARIA), which recognise excellence, innovation, and achievement across all genres of the music of Australia. They commenced in 1987.

Year	Nominee / work	Award	Result	Ref.
2013	Hate	Best Hard Rock or Heavy Metal Album	Nominated	
2015	Holy War	Best Hard Rock or Heavy Metal Album	Nominated	
