= Dear Desolation =

Studio album by Thy Art Is Murder
- Released: 18 August 2017
- Genres: Deathcore; death metal; blackened death metal
- Length: 38:17
- Label: Nuclear Blast
- Producer: Will Putney

Thy Art Is Murder chronology
Holy War (2015)	Dear Desolation (2017)	Human Target (2019)

Dear Desolation is the fourth studio album by Australian deathcore band Thy Art Is Murder. The album was released on 18 August 2017 by Nuclear Blast. The record is the band's last album with founding drummer Lee Stanton, as well as the first to feature Kevin Butler on bass.

== Background ==
Following the release of their third full-length album Holy War in 2015, vocalist CJ McMahon briefly left the band. In January 2017, the band announced McMahon's return and released the stand-alone single "No Absolution" (a B-side from the Holy War recording sessions) as part of the announcement.

According to Eliran Kantor, the artist behind the album's cover, the image of the wolf feeding a baby lamb serves to convey the album's primary themes of greed, oppression, cynicism, preying on and misleading the weak, and the connection of fear & hope; the wolf feeding the baby lamb outwardly portrays kindness, while in reality, the wolf is helping the lamb to grow in order to prepare a bigger meal for herself.

== Critical reception ==
Professional ratings
Review scores
Source	Rating
Exclaim!	9/10
Metal Hammer	3.5/5 stars
Metal Injection	7/10

The album received generally positive reviews from music critics. Exclaim! called it "the band's strongest album to date", noting the band's stylistic shift from deathcore towards conventional death metal inspired by bands like Behemoth and Cannibal Corpse. It has been described as continuing their prior deathcore sound by Metal Hammer. Metal Hammer praised McMahon's vocal performance, and wrote that though the album is "short on the penetrative hooks that Holy War possessed in abundance, Into Chaos We Climb and The Final Curtain's seismic jolts and haunting leads leave an indelible mark for deathcore disciples to latch onto."

== Track listing ==
No.	Title	Length
1.	"Slaves Beyond Death"	3:44
2.	"The Son of Misery"	4:18
3.	"Puppet Master"	3:15
4.	"Dear Desolation"	3:21
5.	"Death Dealer"	4:08
6.	"Man Is the Enemy"	3:28
7.	"The Skin of the Serpent"	3:58
8.	"Fire in the Sky"	4:10
9.	"Into Chaos We Climb"	4:05
10.	"The Final Curtain"	3:50
Total length:		38:17

== Personnel ==
=== Thy Art Is Murder ===
- Chris "CJ" McMahon – vocals
- Andy Marsh – lead guitar
- Sean Delander – rhythm guitar
- Kevin Butler – bass guitar
- Lee Stanton – drums

=== Production ===
- Eliran Kantor – artwork
- Will Putney – mixing, mastering, production, engineering
- Randy LeBeouf – additional engineering
- Steve Seid – additional engineering
- Randy Slaugh – additional programming

== Charts ==
Chart (2017)	Peak position
Australian Albums (ARIA)	5
Austrian Albums (Ö3 Austria)	28
Belgian Albums (Ultratop Flanders)	97
Belgian Albums (Ultratop Wallonia)	106
German Albums (Offizielle Top 100)	29
New Zealand Heatseekers Albums (RMNZ)	7
Scottish Albums (Official Charts)	90
Swiss Albums (Schweizer Hitparade)	42
US Billboard 200	95
US Top Hard Rock Albums (Billboard)	3
US Top Rock Albums (Billboard)	15
