= Death Is Birth =

EP by Gallows
- Released: 5 December 2011
- Genre: Hardcore punk
- Length: 7:39
- Labels: Thirty Days of Night, 6131
- Producer: Joby J. Ford

Gallows chronology
Grey Britain (2009)	Death Is Birth (2011)	Gallows (2012)

Death Is Birth is an EP released by the British hardcore punk band Gallows, released 5 December 2011 through Thirty Days of Night Records. It is the band's first release with singer Wade MacNeil, formerly of Alexisonfire, who replaced original Gallows singer Frank Carter when the latter left the band in July 2011. The EP was recorded in Los Angeles and produced by Joby J. Ford of The Bronx. It includes a re-recording of the track "True Colours", previously released as a free download in August 2011.

== Background ==
Frank Carter the original vocalist of Gallows announced in early July 2011 that he would be leaving Gallows because of differing opinions in writing the band's follow-up album to their second release Grey Britain. His departure was effective on 1 August after the band's final tour dates. Just eight days after Frank's departure, on the 9 August 2011, MacNeil was confirmed as the new Gallows vocalist. MacNeil has stated that the members of Gallows asked him initially out of coincidence that Alexisonfire had disbanded and Gallows needed a new singer. With Frank's departure fans of the band started to believe that he left because he wanted to continue playing heavy music, while the band wanted to go in a more melodic direction; the band decided to release something to show this as false.

From the moment Wade's arrived in Britain in July Gallows started writing new material to follow up to their 2009 album Grey Britain. The EP itself was both written and recorded in a short period of time. A majority of the music featured on the extended play was written by the band before Wade had joined and that they put the finishing touches on the record with him. Lee Barratt summarises the EP as a "good release of anger" and that all the band felt "particularly venomous when Wade joined". Just a few months later in November the band made the announcement that the new extended play would be released in early December. After the band's infamous split from Warner Bros the band decided to work on an independent record label for the release, Thirty Days of Night whom they considered as "Gallows family".

== Themes ==
The EP has been seen by critics simply as "unapologetic hardcore punk" and being the most aggressive work Gallows had done so far. A more Americanised influence can be heard throughout the EP as it's been likened to bands like Cancer Bats and Every Time I Die. MacNeil had always stated the EP helped build on what he has always liked about Gallows; he considers it being "Four songs like a kick in the teeth". In the writing of the new extended play the band focused on less typical song structures and focused on the chaotic sound from live shows. MacNeil believed that "sometimes you don't need to overcomplicate things. Obviously, we're trying to write music that's chaotic and is going to be something that comes across vicious-sounding live... you don't repeat it four times, you do it once, and you don't have a bridge." Gallows guitarist Laurent Barnard said how the EP would not sound similar to the band's third studio album by saying "If you're going to make a punk rock EP, you might as well make it the most punk rock thing you can really."

Music critics have described True Colours upon its release as a single as "the most brutal thing Gallows has done." Andrew Ford of Hit The Floor Magazine considered it a "36 second middle finger to all those who have suggested this is the end of the road for the Watford lads." Something which both critics and Wade MacNeil himself have acknowledged is his distinct tone of voice from Frank Carter even to the point in which their fan base could be divided over the decision to have Wade in the band. Wade wanted the EP and the future lyrics of Gallows records to have a much more global view. Believing that the band's second studio album Grey Britain had too much of a British perspective.

== Release and promotion ==
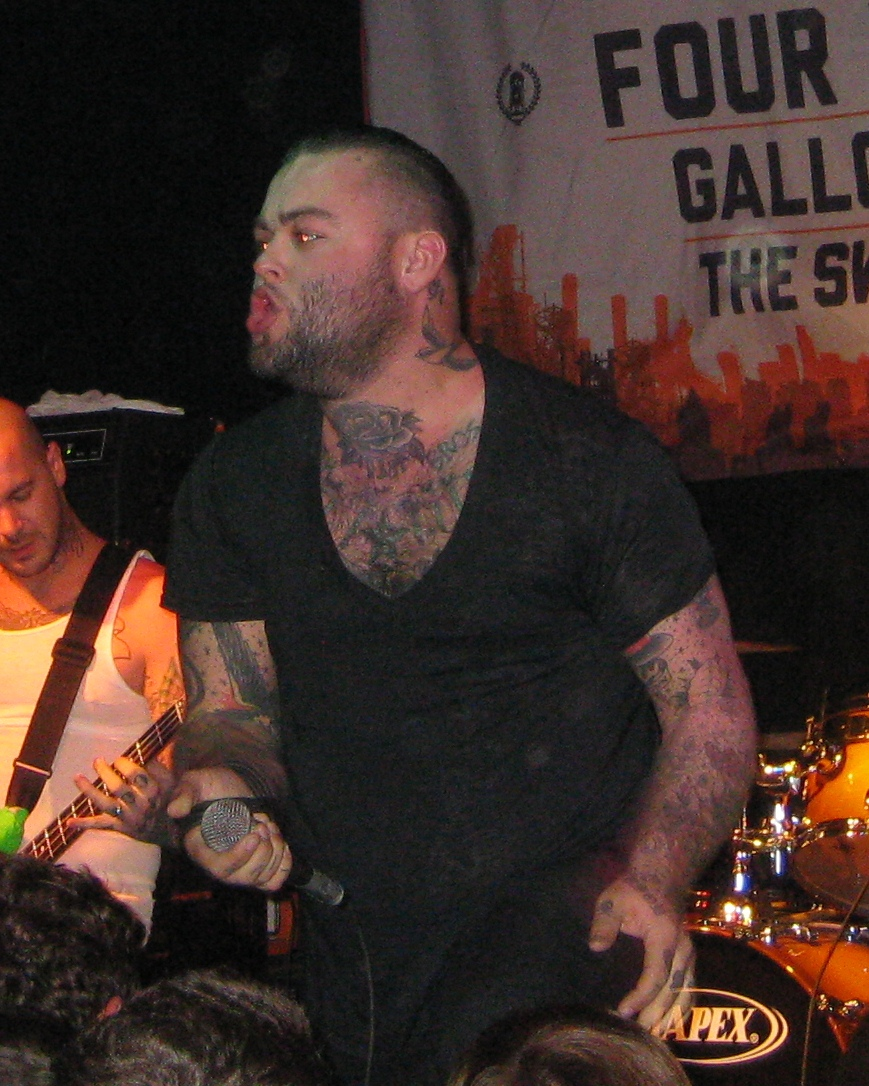
Wade MacNeil, formerly of Alexisonfire, replaced Frank Carter as Gallows' lead singer in 2011.

The band released the first song from the EP, True Colours for free download on 29 August 2011 from their band website. They then released Mondo Chaos as a digital single on 25 November. Just a few days before that on 17 November the song was leaked. Gallows completed their first tour after the release of True Colours with MacNeil as frontman in the United States and Canada in November alongside Four Year Strong, Title Fight and The Swellers and Sharks. The band incorporated songs from the first two albums live set-lists. MacNeil said that he aimed to alter the songs in a way that "breathes some life into them" but also wanted to keep what "people love about those songs and what I love about those songs." 6131 Records released the EP in North America on vinyl record.

== Reception ==
Professional ratings
Review scores
Source	Rating
Alter the Press!	4/5
Alternative Press	4/5 stars
Kerrang!	4/5 stars
PopMatters	5/10 discs
Rock Sound	9/10
Thrash Hits	5/6 stars

Death Is Birth received positive reception from music critics. British publication Kerrang! gave the album an "Excellent" four out of five "K"s describing the EP as "The snarling rebirth of the UKs best punk band." Vincent Danger when writing for Thrash Hits gave the album a 5 out of 6 stars giving the album a positive review praising their choice of front man to replace Carter. "there's only so much one can say about 459 seconds of music. There's enough here to prove that Lags Barnard's songwriting skills aren't on the wane and that Wade MacNeil is a more than able replacement for Carter." Alternative Press writer Jason Pettigrew appreciated the album's short but violent writing in his 4 out of 5 star review; saying "the EP is steeped in impenetrable, relentless nihilism and thrashing madness that's one part noise weapon ("True Colours"), one part circle-pit centrifuge ("Hate Hate Hate") and two parts hateful hardcore ("Mondo Chaos" and the title track)." Dan Issitt, a writer for Alter The Press! gave the album a score of 4/5 in an otherwise positive review did see fault in the change of front man. "Some fans will undoubtedly find it hard to get past the fact that he isn't Frank Carter, but a little scratch at the surface will reveal the same aggression and similar bile-filled lyrics you'd expect from one of Britain's most hateful bands."

== Track listing ==
No.	Title	Length
1.	"Mondo Chaos"	2:37
2.	"True Colours"	0:36
3.	"Hate! Hate! Hate!"	2:02
4.	"Death Is Birth"	2:24
Total length:		7:39

== Personnel ==
- Wade MacNeil – lead vocals
- Laurent "Lags" Barnard – guitar, backing vocals
- Steph Carter – guitar, backing vocals
- Stuart Gili-Ross – bass guitar, backing vocals
- Lee Barratt – drums, percussion
