= Human Target (album) =

Studio album by Thy Art Is Murder
- Released: 26 July 2019
- Studio: Graphic Nature Audio
- Genre: Deathcore
- Length: 38:28
- Label: Nuclear Blast; Human Warfare
- Producer: Will Putney

Thy Art Is Murder chronology
Dear Desolation (2017)	Human Target (2019)	Godlike (2023)

Professional ratings
Review scores
Source	Rating
Kerrang!	3/5
Blabbermouth.net	7.5/10 stars

Human Target is the fifth studio album by Australian deathcore band Thy Art Is Murder. The album was released on 26 July 2019 through Nuclear Blast and the band's independent label Human Warfare. It is the band's first album with drummer Jesse Beahler following the departure of Lee Stanton, and the last album with vocalist Chris "CJ" McMahon, who was fired by the band in September 2023.

== Background ==
Andy Marsh, who wrote lyrics for several of the album's songs, named "politics, privatized prisons, environment and the planet, human organ harvesting, the pharmaceutical industry" as key topics. Marsh noted the contribution of the band's new drummer Jesse Beahler: "He gave a lot of really fresh ideas as far as how to push and pull with the verses and incorporate some groove-y elements and breakdowns. He adds this technical, Meshuggah-esque element".

== Track listing ==
Human Target track listing
No.	Title	Length
1.	"Human Target"	3:31
2.	"New Gods"	3:01
3.	"Death Squad Anthem"	3:13
4.	"Make America Hate Again"	3:14
5.	"Eternal Suffering"	5:05
6.	"Welcome Oblivion"	3:36
7.	"Atonement"	3:59
8.	"Voyeurs Into Death"	3:30
9.	"Eye for an Eye"	4:55
10.	"Chemical Christ"	4:24
Total length:		38:28

== Personnel ==
=== Thy Art Is Murder ===
- Chris "CJ" McMahon – vocals
- Andy Marsh – lead guitar
- Sean Delander – rhythm guitar
- Kevin Butler – bass guitar
- Jesse Beahler – drums

=== Production ===
- Eliran Kantor – artwork
- Will Putney – mixing, mastering, production, engineering

== Charts ==
Chart performance for Human Target
Chart (2019)	Peak position
Australian Albums (ARIA)	11
Austrian Albums (Ö3 Austria)	42
German Albums (Offizielle Top 100)	16
Scottish Albums (OCC)	65
Swiss Albums (Schweizer Hitparade)	90
US Independent Albums (Billboard)	11
