= Aversions Crown =

Australian deathcore band

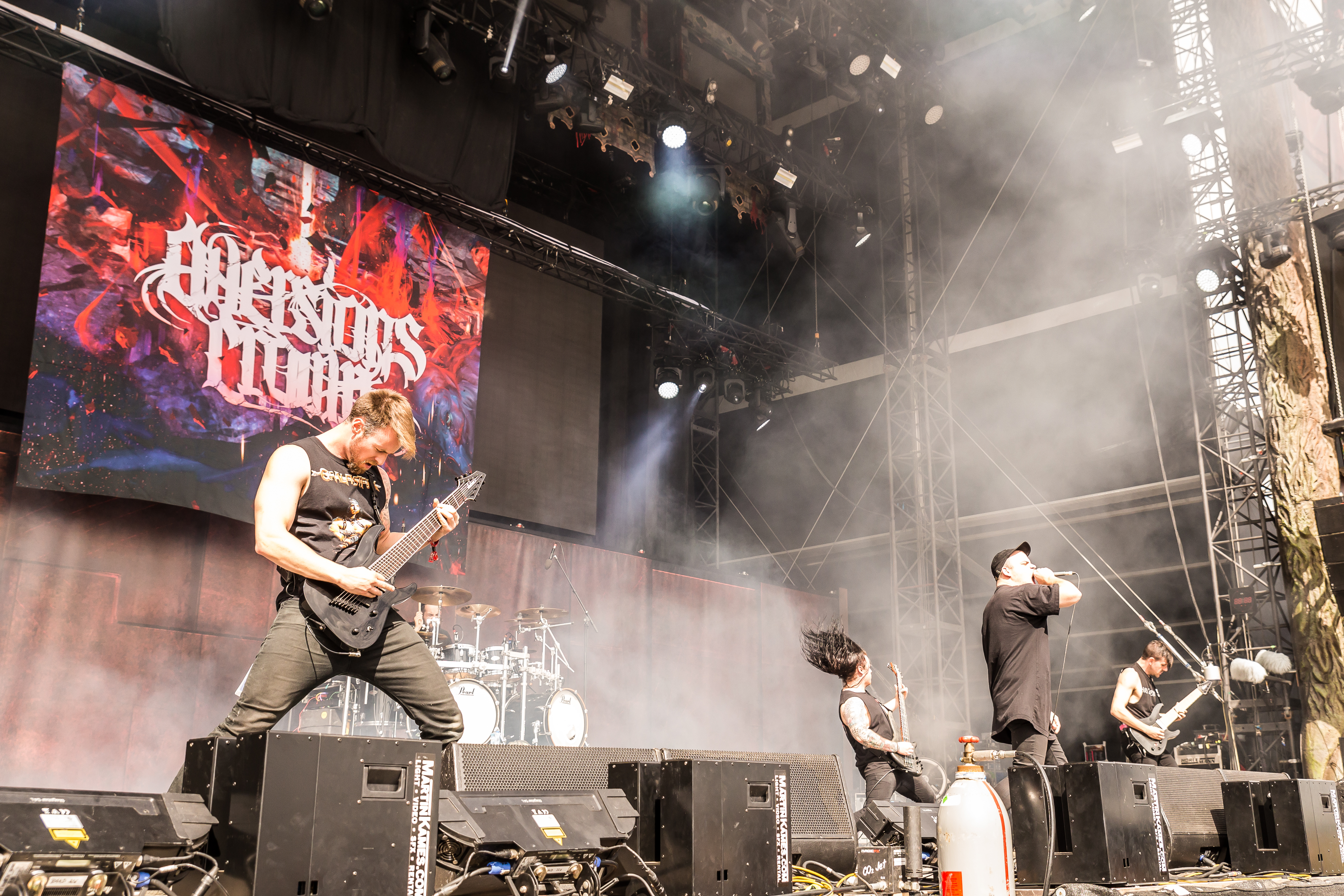
- Aversions Crown live at Summer Breeze Open Air in 2017

Background information
- Origin: Brisbane, Queensland, Australia
- Genres: Deathcore; technical death metal
- Years active: 2009–present
- Label: Nuclear Blast
- Members: Alex Teyen; Chris Cougan; Michael Jeffery; Jayden Mason
- Past members: Joshua Taafe; Mitchell Fitzpatrick; Steve Noad; Kevin Butler; Colin Jeffs; Hayden Foot; Jay Coombs; Mark Poida; Tyler Miller

Aversions Crown is an Australian deathcore band formed in 2009 in Brisbane, Queensland. The band has been referred to as "progressive alien deathcore" due to the band's fast and technical deathcore style and for their lyrical themes of science fiction and aliens invading the earth. They are currently signed to Nuclear Blast. The band has released four studio albums with their latest being Hell Will Come For Us All, released on June 12, 2020, through Nuclear Blast.

== History ==
The band independently released their self-titled EP in 2009. This was then followed by their debut studio album titled Servitude, which was released in December 2011, it too was self-released. In January 2013, the band released a single titled "Overseer", the band released another single titled "Hollow Planet" on September 15, 2013. The band would support Thy Art is Murder's Hate Across Australia Tour 2013 with Cattle Decapitation and King Parrot. They would also appear in Australia's Vans Warped Tour 2013. The band would sign to Nuclear Blast in 2014 and released their second studio album titled Tyrant in November 2014, the album was produced by Thy Art is Murder guitarist Andy Marsh and mixed and mastered by Mark Lewis (who has previously worked with bands such as All That Remains and Carnifex).

In January 2015, the band announced that vocalist Colin Jeffs had left the band and that Mark Poida joined as the band's new vocalist. In June 2015, the band released a standalone single titled "Parasites". In support of the Tyrant album, the band toured in europe in early 2016 with support from A Night in Texas and Rings of Saturn. In early 2016, the band released the single "Erebus". On November 25, 2016, the band announced their third studio album, Xenocide, which was released on January 20, 2017, and showcased the single "Ophiophagy". On January 11, 2017, the band released a music video for the track "Prismatic Abyss". In June 2018, the band released another standalone single titled "The Breeding Process". The band toured in North America in the summer of 2018 with The Black Dahlia Murder, Whitechapel, Fleshgod Apocalypse and Shadow of Intent.

Vocalist Mark Poida left the band in early 2019. The band then recruited Tyler Miller (vocalist of Knoxville-based band The Guild) as their new vocalist. On March 13, 2020, the band announced their fourth studio album, Hell Will Come For Us All, which was released on June 12, 2020, and mixed and mastered by Fit for an Autopsy guitarist Will Putney, the first single titled "The Soil" was released. The second single titled "Born In The Gutter" was released on May 8, 2020. The band released a music video for the track "Paradigm" on June 12, 2020, coinciding with the album release. In September 2023, Thy Art is Murder recruited Tyler Miller as their new vocalist to replace the fired CJ McMahon, and subsequently re-recorded the vocal tracks on Godlike with Miller.

The band silently parted ways with Miller after he joined Thy Art is Murder in 2023. They then recruited Black Tongue vocalist, Alex Teyen as their new vocalist. With Teyen in the band, they recorded a three-track EP titled A Voice from the Outer Dark in October 2024. The band officially announced Teyen as the vocalist of the band on June 10, 2025 and released a single off the new EP titled "A Voice from the Outer Dark" that same day.

== Band members ==
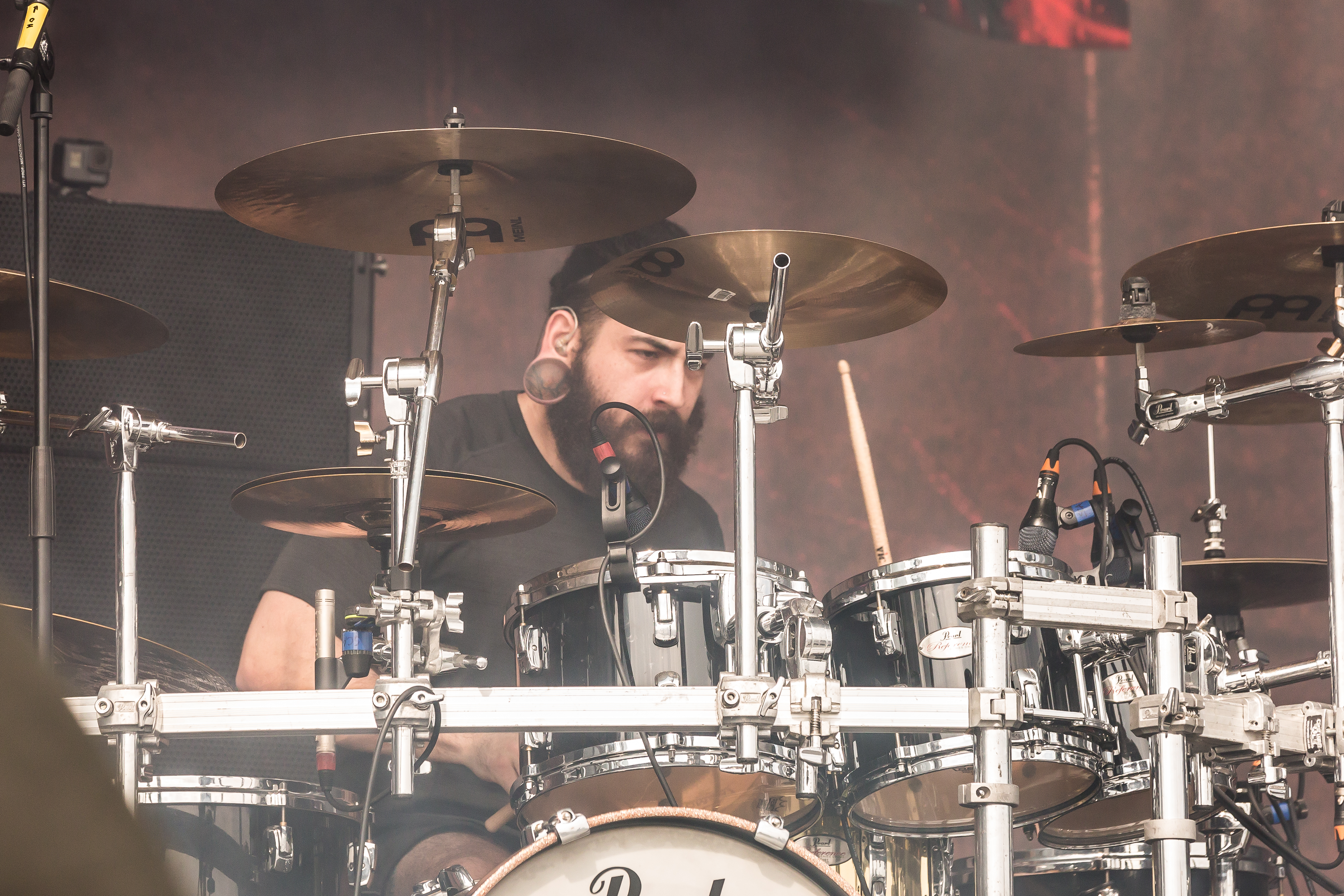
Drummer Jayden Mason at Summer Breeze Open Air 2017

Current lineup

- Chris Cougan – lead guitar (2009–present)
- Jayden Mason – drums (2009–present)
- Michael "Mick" Jeffery – rhythm guitar (2013–present)
- Alex Teyen – lead vocals (2024–present)

Former members

- Joshua Taafe – bass (2009, live 2018)
- Mitchell Fitzpatrick – lead vocals (2009), guitar (2009–2011)
- Kevin Butler – guitar (2011–2013)
- Colin Jeffs – lead vocals (2011–2015)
- Steve Noad – bass (2011–2013)
- Hayden Foot – rhythm guitar (2013–2015)
- Jay Coombs – bass (2013–2015)
- Mark Poida – lead vocals (2015–2019)
- Tyler Miller – lead vocals (2019–2023)

== Discography ==
Studio Albums

- Servitude (2011)
- Tyrant (2014)
- Xenocide (2017)
- Hell Will Come For Us All (2020)

EPs

- Aversions Crown (2009)
- A Voice from the Outer Dark (2025)

Singles

- "Overseer" (2013)
- "Hollow Planet" (2013)
- "The Glass Sentient" (2014)
- "Vectors" (2014)
- "Parasites" (2015)
- "Erebus" (2016)
- "Ophiophagy" (2016)
- "The Soulless Acolyte" (2016)
- "Prismatic Abyss" (2017)
- "The Breeding Process" (2018)
- "The Soil" (2020)
- "Born In The Gutter" (2020)
- "A Voice from the Outer Dark" (2025)
