= The Adversary (Thy Art Is Murder album) =

Studio album by Thy Art Is Murder
- Released: 16 July 2010
- Recorded: 2010
- Genre: Deathcore; technical death metal
- Length: 37:28
- Label: Skull and Bones
- Producer: Toby Learmont

Thy Art Is Murder chronology
Infinite Death (2008)	The Adversary (2010)	Hate (2012)

The Adversary is the debut studio album by Australian deathcore band Thy Art Is Murder. The album was released on 16 July 2010 through Skull and Bone Records. It is the first release to feature vocalist Chris "CJ" McMahon and last release to feature guitarist Gary Markowski and bassist Mick Low. Guitarist Sean Delander replaced Mick Low on bass and Andy Marsh and Tom Brown joined as the new guitarists on the album Hate.

== Track listing ==
No.	Title	Length
1.	"Unholy Sermons"	0:50
2.	"Soldiers of Immortality"	3:26
3.	"Laceration Penetration"	4:25
4.	"Furnace of Hate"	3:22
5.	"Flesh Oracle"	3:21
6.	"The Adversary"	4:06
7.	"Decrepit Purification"	3:51
8.	"The False Prophet"	3:30
9.	"Engineering the Antichrist"	3:32
10.	"Requiem"	2:20
11.	"Coward's Throne"	4:45
Total length:		37:28

== Personnel ==
Thy Art Is Murder

- Chris "CJ" McMahon – vocals
- Sean Delander – rhythm guitar
- Gary Markowski – lead guitar
- Mick Low – bass
- Lee Stanton – drums

Technical staff and artwork

- Toby Learmont – production, mastering
- Michael Low – engineering
- Shane "Buddha" Edwards – mixing, editing
- Jumali Katani – cover art
- Remy Cuveillier – layout
