= Grey Britain =

2009 studio album by Gallows

Studio album by Gallows
- Released: 2 May 2009
- Recorded: 2008
- Studios: Rak Studios (London, England); The Farm Studios (Vancouver, British Columbia, Canada)
- Genres: Hardcore punk, metalcore
- Length: 52:11
- Label: Warner Bros.
- Producers: Garth Richardson; Gallows

Gallows chronology
Gallows / November Coming Fire (2007)	Grey Britain (2009)	Death Is Birth (2011)

Singles from Grey Britain
- 1. "The Vulture (Acts I & II)" Released: 27 April 2009; 2. "London is the Reason" Released: 22 May 2009; 3. "Misery" Released: 10 November 2009

Grey Britain is the second album by English hardcore punk band Gallows, released 2 May 2009 through Warner Bros. Records. It is their last album to feature lead singer Frank Carter, and their first with guitarist Steph Carter writing and recording.

== Background information ==
A second album by Gallows was first hinted by vocalist Frank Carter during an interview with NME in 2007, where he stated that because Gallows was "a hobby I get paid for," the band would likely be defunct by 2010. However, he confirmed that during this period, the band would record up to two additional albums. He later told Kerrang! that the claims regarding the band's imminent break-up were untrue.

In an interview with Kerrang!, it was revealed that Gallows' sophomore effort would feature guest appearances by Biffy Clyro's Simon Neil, and various members of Rolo Tomassi and Cancer Bats. In an interview at Sonisphere 2009, the brother of Frank Carter and vocalist of British hardcore band Blackhole, Richard Carter confirmed that he appeared on the track 'Black Eyes'.

In the March edition of Total Guitar, guitarists Steph Carter and Laurent Barnard noted that most of the keyboards had been stripped back and that the guitars were reminiscent of Black Sabbath's 1970s efforts.

In a January 2009 interview with Rock Sound, Carter announced that Grey Britain would be "49 minutes of aggressive music" and that signing a contract with a major label had not influenced the band to record a "poppy" or more "commercial" album.

On 13 January 2009 Carter revealed on BBC Radio 1 that the album would be released in early May 2009, after which the band will resume touring. On the following day, the band announced their second studio album would be titled Grey Britain, and that it has been produced by Garth Richardson. Carter explained the premise of the album to Kerrang!, saying, "Britain is fucked. Grey Britain is all about what's going on socially, politically and economically in the UK and how it affects us." The tracklisting was revealed on 16 February 2009. Describing the methods of getting samples for the album, bassist Stu Gili-Ross stated "The samples on the album are real. There’s the sound of the River Thames when we went down to the riverbank and recorded the sound of the water. There’s a lot of stuff on there. We went into a Halal slaughterhouse where a pig was getting slaughtered for food. I wouldn’t say it was a pig getting murdered, that’s a bit strong. It was going to die anyway so we just turned up with a microphone and captured the sounds.” However, after PETA criticized the use of a real pig dying for the album, the band revealed they lied and found the sample online.

On 1 March 2009 it was announced that the first single from the album would be "The Vulture (Acts I & II)," to be released on 27 April. The music video for "The Vulture (Act II)" had its world premiere on 23 March 2009.

On 17 March 2009, it was revealed that the album's original cover art had to be censored under the Obscene Publications Act 1959 and that album's tie-in DVD had been given an 18 certificate.

== Reception and commercial performance ==
Professional ratings
Aggregate scores
Source	Rating
Metacritic	74/100
Review scores
Source	Rating
AllMusic	3/5 stars
Clash	9/10
Decibel	8/10
Drowned in Sound	8/10
Metal Hammer	8/10
Mojo	4/5 stars
NME	3/5 stars
The Observer	4/5 stars
PopMatters	5/10
The Telegraph	5/5 stars

Grey Britain received a 74 out of 100 on Metacritic, indicating "generally favorable reviews".

Drowned in Sound commented: "the music rockets from intentionally rudimentary knuckle-whiteners to ambitious-of-design affairs that reconfigure one’s opinions on a band previously seen as a straight-up hardcore act". Ben Myers of Mojo commented "Not since the Pistols and The Specials has a pissed off provincial band so clearly meant it" and ClashMusic called the record "as daunting as blow-drying your face in the evil ghost-gas that Indiana Jones unleashes from The Lost Ark". The Telegraph praised the group for its lack of compromise, calling Grey Britain "a masterpiece of rock brutalism". It also noted the progression of Gallows' sound, combining traditional hardcore sound with newer styles, comparing the "grotesquely churning riffage" with that used by nu metal bands such as Slipknot. It summed up the album as "the most exciting album in many moons."

Kerrang! listed Grey Britain as the best album of 2009. NME listed the album among the 15 greatest hardcore punk albums of all time.

The album debuted at number 20 in the UK album chart on 10 May 2009. By January 2010, it had sold 20,000 copies in the United Kingdom and 50,000 copies worldwide, leading Warner Bros. Records to drop Gallows from its roster.

In 2014, it was listed as one of Metal Hammer's "Modern Classics".

== Musical style and lyrical themes ==
The album has been categorised as hardcore punk and metalcore, showing significantly more metal influence than the band's prior material. Many tracks make heavy use of samples of the River Thames, orchestras and church bells. Songs often makes use fast tempos, gang vocals, heavy guitar riffs and hooks.

=== Lyrical themes ===
Grey Britain is a concept album based around post–2008 financial crisis Britain, predicting an increase in "racism, xenophobia, knife crime and inescapable mental illness". In an article for Vice, writer Tom Connick described it as "post-apocalyptic" and as "a record so nihilistic, unpalatable and inescapably bleak it made Orchestra Of Wolves look like nothing more than a temper tantrum". The album's final track makes direct attacks against the Metropolitan Police Service, Catholicism, the National Front, rapists, child abusers and racists.

In 2019, Vice praised it for its accurate prediction of "fractured Brexit Britain" and lead vocalist Frank Carter stated "We were writing about a post-apocalyptic future in London. And, unfortunately, now… I’m living in it".

== Track listing ==
All tracks are written by Gallows.

No.	Title	Length
1.	"The Riverbank"	2:30
2.	"London Is the Reason"	3:11
3.	"Leeches"	3:46
4.	"Black Eyes (featuring Richard Carter)"	2:51
5.	"I Dread the Night"	3:39
6.	"Death Voices"	3:55
7.	"The Vulture (Acts I & II)"	6:02
8.	"The Riverbed"	3:57
9.	"The Great Forgiver"	2:14
10.	"Graves (featuring Simon Neil)"	2:42
11.	"Queensberry Rules"	4:16
12.	"Misery"	5:09
13.	"Crucifucks"	7:59

== Personnel ==
Adapted from Allmusic.

Gallows

- Frank Carter – vocals, production
- Laurent Barnard – guitar, keyboards, production
- Steph Carter – guitar, backing vocals, production
- Stuart Gili-Ross – bass, production
- Lee Barratt – drums, production

Additional musicians

- David Daniels – cello
- Marren Fielinski – violin
- Perry Mason – violin
- Bruce Ruhite – violin

Production

- Garth Richardson – production
- Jonathan Carter – remote recording
- John O'Mahony – mixing
- Ben Kaplan – engineering
- Richard Lancaster – engineering
- Thomas Mitchener – remote recording
- Jan Petrov – mixing assistant
- Robbie Nelson – engineering
- Howie Weinberg – mastering
