= Godlike (Thy Art Is Murder album) =

Studio album by Thy Art Is Murder
- Released: 22 September 2023
- Genre: Deathcore
- Length: 40:12
- Label: Human Warfare
- Producer: Will Putney

Thy Art Is Murder chronology
Human Target (2019)	Godlike (2023)

Singles from Godlike
- 1. "Join Me in Armageddon" Released: 9 May 2023; 2. "Keres" Released: 11 July 2023; 3. "Blood Throne" Released: 15 August 2023

Godlike is the sixth studio album by Australian deathcore band Thy Art Is Murder. Originally scheduled for release on 15 September 2023, the album was released on 22 September 2023 through the band's independent label Human Warfare and was produced by Will Putney.

Godlike is the band's first album without longtime vocalist Chris "CJ" McMahon, who was fired by the band one day before the album release. It is also the band's only album with vocalist Tyler Miller, whose vocals were retracked for the album after McMahon's ouster. The initial CD and vinyl copies of the album, released in 2023, have McMahon's vocals intact—but streaming and later physical releases instead feature Miller's vocals.

== Background and promotion ==
On 7 April 2022, Thy Art Is Murder announced that they are beginning to record the new album. On 25 October, the band shared through social media a preview of the record's new material.

On 9 May 2023, Thy Art Is Murder published the lead single "Join Me in Armageddon" and an accompanying music video. At the same time, they officially announced the album itself and release date, whilst also revealing the album cover and the track list. On 11 July, the band unveiled the second single "Keres" and its corresponding music video. On 15 August, one month before the album release, the band released the third single "Blood Throne" along with a music video. On 12 September, due to the production delays, the band announced that they pushed back the release of the album to 22 September.

On 23 September, one day after the release of the album, Thy Art Is Murder revealed on social media that they fired vocalist CJ McMahon without his knowledge. A later edition of the album features re-recorded vocals from a then-unknown vocalist with McMahon being removed from the album. This vocalist was later revealed to be Tyler Miller, known for his work as a vocalist in Aversions Crown. McMahon was only aware of his removal after the band released a statement, indicating that the band had made the decision to replace McMahon's vocals while he was still in the band. According to a statement from the band, the split was partially due to McMahon's "recent anti-trans comments" that he shared on social media.

== Critical reception ==
Professional ratings
Review scores
Source	Rating
Distorted Sound	7/10
Rock 'N' Load	10/10
Wall of Sound	9/10

The album received generally positive reviews from critics. Graham Ray of Distorted Sound scored the album 7 out of 10 and said: "Godlike doesn't live up to its title, but it is yet another strong dose of deathcore from the Australian veterans. There are some change-ups within their sound and it's great to see the band try something a little different here and there but at the end of the day it struggles to hang with the fresh blood in the scene." Rock 'N' Load praised the album saying, "Godlike really feels like the band can hold their own & they know who they are. There are no real big jumps in style on the album but just a great & steady progression from album to album. The band are slowly getting more punishing & heavy as the years progress, but also staying as one of the bands that still slip so greatly through genres & will always impress anyone who loves extreme music." Wall of Sound scored the album 9/10 and wrote: "While staying true to their deathcore roots, Thy Art Is Murder have created an album that can easily be envisioned being performed on arena stages or large-scale festival headline slots as the group transitions into playing on those platforms at this time in their career. My only gripe was the LP's repetitive nature in terms of overall sound. In saying that, it is no wonder why they're considered amongst the world's best in this genre."

== Track listing ==
Godlike track listing
No.	Title	Length
1.	"Destroyer of Dreams"	4:39
2.	"Blood Throne"	3:23
3.	"Join Me in Armageddon"	4:38
4.	"Keres"	3:36
5.	"Everything Unwanted"	5:05
6.	"Lesson in Pain"	4:05
7.	"Godlike"	4:14
8.	"Corrosion"	3:49
9.	"Anathema"	3:29
10.	"Bermuda"	3:14
Total length:		40:12

== Personnel ==
Thy Art Is Murder

- Tyler Miller – vocals (reissue version)
- Andy Marsh – lead guitar
- Sean Delander – rhythm guitar
- Kevin Butler – bass
- Jesse Beahler – drums

Additional musicians

- Chris "CJ" McMahon – vocals (original version)

Additional personnel

- Will Putney – production, mixing, mastering

== Charts ==
Chart performance for Godlike
Chart (2023)	Peak position
Australian Albums (ARIA)	31
UK Album Downloads (Official Charts)	93
