= Carnival Kids (band) =

Norwegian-Anglo rock band

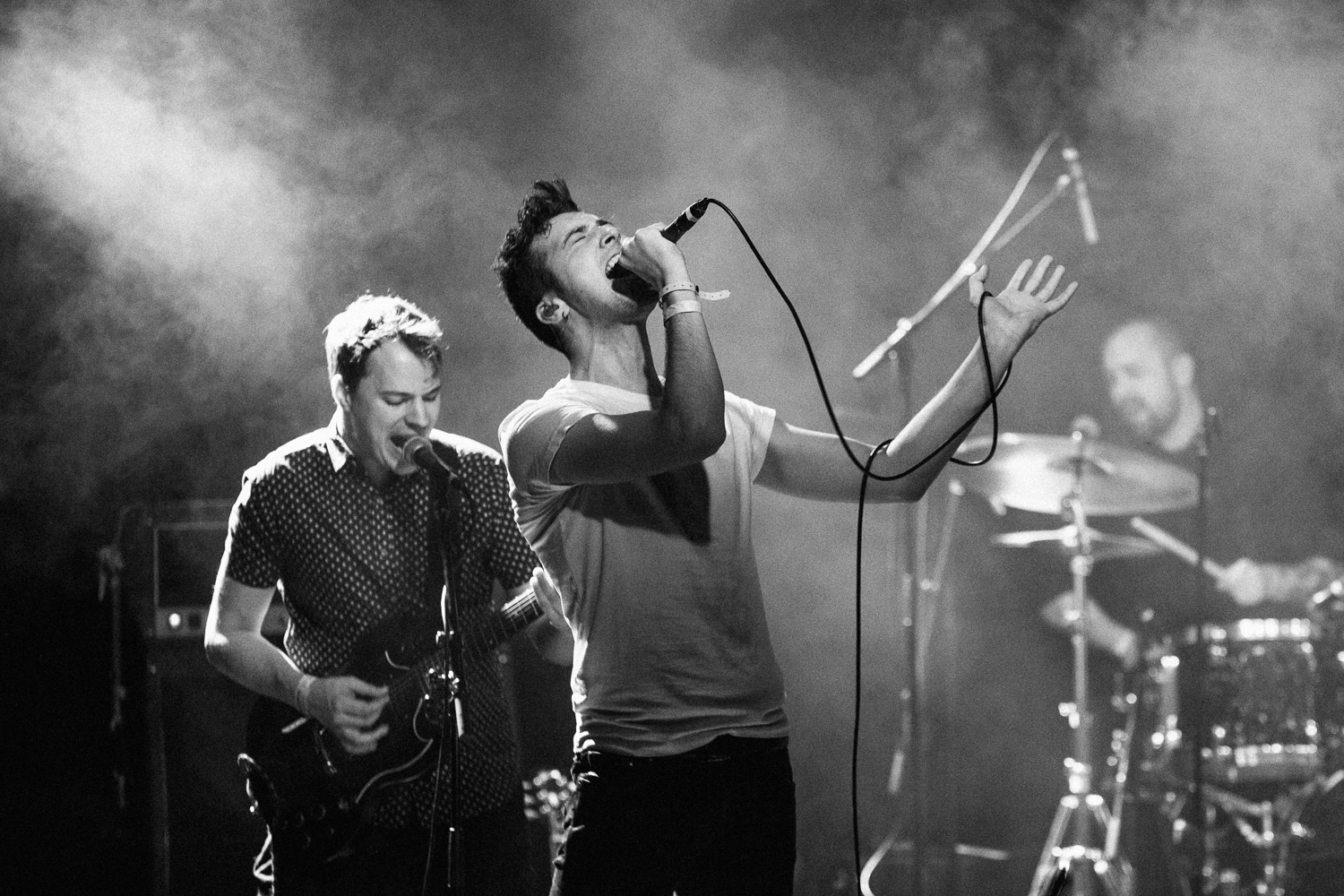
- Frontman Eric Molumby with Jethro Fox and Andreas Westhagen

Background information
- Origin: Norway
- Genres: Rock
- Occupations: musicians, songwriters
- Years active: 2013–present
- Label: Warner Music Norway
- Website: https://www.carnivalkids.no/

Carnival Kids are a Norwegian-Anglo rock band made up of Eric Molumby (born November 1, 1988) on vocals, Jethro Fox (born February 26, 1990) on guitar, John Stark (born January 6, 1990) on bass and Andreas Westhagen (born May 21, 1988) on drums. They released their first single "Fear Of Nothing" in 2013, and became commonly known in Norway for their spot in the "NRK P3's Urørt finals from 2014

== Background ==
The band members first met in Liverpool at LIPA in 2011. They quickly founded the band 'Carnival Kids', and kept working the band even though Molumby and Westhagen moved back to Norway. The English members, Fox and Stark, moved in together in Liverpool, and the group commuted back and forth to meet up, practice, write and record their music.

They first started receiving much attention through the Norwegian music competition Urørt held by NRK P3. This led the band to try and make it as a band in Norway, and Fox and Stark moved in with the rest of the band in Oslo. It was with their second single, «What To Do When Awake Within A Dream» that they reached the finals of the competition, and their participation led to a record deal with Warner Music Norway in 2014. They started releasing singles from their debut album later on that same year, and the album, «While The World Keeps Ending», was released in full in 2015.

Their music is inspired by post-hardcore and punk and they co-write all their songs, often through jamming. Fox, Stark and Westhagen also contribute on vocals, both on and off stage. Since the start of their career, Carnival Kids have been critically acclaimed for their live shows, and the EP «Carnival Kids» from 2017 is recorded with the mindset of it imitating their live sound.

=== Live ===
Carnival Kids have played a number of shows and festivals in Norway, the UK and the US over the years. They've played at the Norwegian industry festival by:Larm three times, first in connection with Urørt in 2014, and then again in 2015 and 2017 following new releases. Most notably they've also performed at some of Norway's biggest festivals, including Hovefestivalen and Slottsfjellfestivalen.

== Discography ==
Singles

- Fear Of Nothing (2013)
- What To Do When Awake Within A Dream (2013)
- Here They Have Guns (2014)
- Lateral Living (2015)
- Unsung Ending (2015)
- A Happier Lie (2017)
- Trick Myself/Artificial Life (2018)
- Wasted Time (2019)

Album

- While The World Keeps Ending (2015)
  - Lateral Living
  - Empires
  - Hallowed Ground
  - Unsung Ending
  - Mechanism
  - Here They Have Guns
  - Time & Method
  - Every Atom In Me
  - The Future Is Mine
  - Among Vultures
  - Black Square
- The Natural Order (2019)
  - The Natural Order
  - No Connection
  - Trick Myself
  - Lucky Ones
  - Wasted Time
  - Waiting For You
  - Crooked Smile
  - Little Circles
  - Artificial Life

EP

- Carnival Kids (2017)
  - A Happier Lie
  - Shadow Of Our Younger Selves
  - Watch It Burn
  - Worship
  - Vision Of Grace

== Eksterne lenker ==
- Web page
