= Gallows (band) =

English hardcore punk band

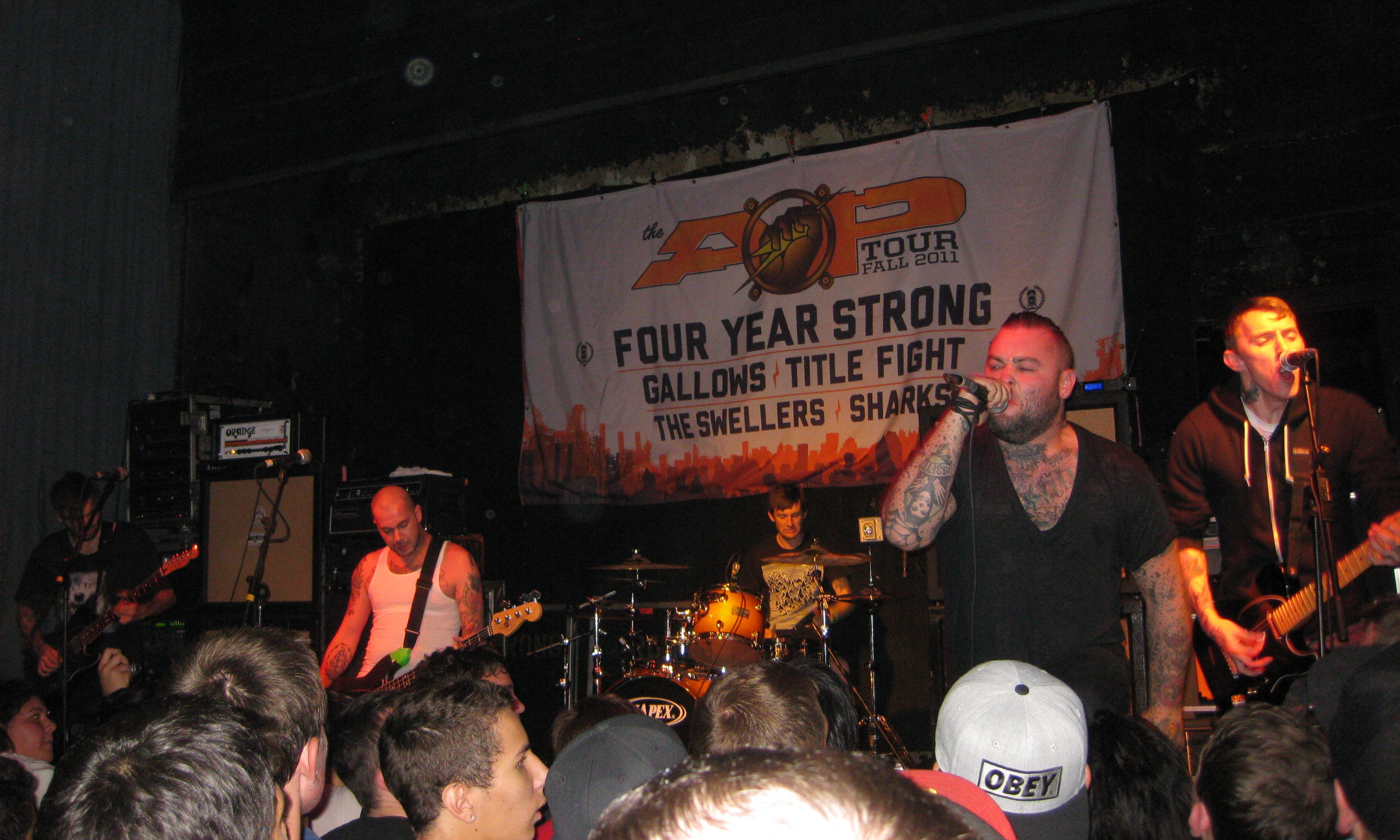
- Gallows live in San Diego in 2011. From left to right: Laurent Barnard, Stuart Gili-Ross, Lee Barratt, Wade MacNeil, and Steph Carter.

Background information
- Origin: Watford, Hertfordshire, England
- Genres: Hardcore punk, post-hardcore
- Years active: 2004–2015; 2018–2021
- Labels: Holy Roar; In at the Deep End; Thirty Days of Night; Epitaph; Warner Bros; Venn; Bridge Nine
- Members: Laurent Barnard; Stuart Gili-Ross; Lee Barratt; Wade MacNeil
- Past members: Frank Carter; Steph Carter; Paul Laventure
- Website: gallows.co.uk

Gallows were an English hardcore punk band from Watford, Hertfordshire. The band was formed in 2004 after Laurent Barnard's previous band disbanded. Gallows' debut album, Orchestra of Wolves, was distributed in the United States by Epitaph Records. The band were subsequently signed to Warner Bros. Records for a £1 million album contract, and released their second album Grey Britain in 2009. The band has been particularly successful in the UK, with two songs charting on the UK Singles Chart, and have been featured in magazines such as Kerrang!, Alternative Press and Rolling Stone.

== History ==
=== Formation and Orchestra of Wolves (2004–2008) ===
Gallows formed in 2004, but didn't begin performing live until 2005. They released their debut album Orchestra of Wolves in 2006 on In at the Deep End Records. The album received acclaim and caught the attention of Bad Religion's Brett Gurewitz, who released it in the US on Epitaph Records, with new tracks including a cover of Black Flag's "Nervous Breakdown". In an interview Gurewitz named Orchestra of Wolves as one of his favourite albums of 2007, praising it as being the best hardcore album since Refused's The Shape of Punk to Come.

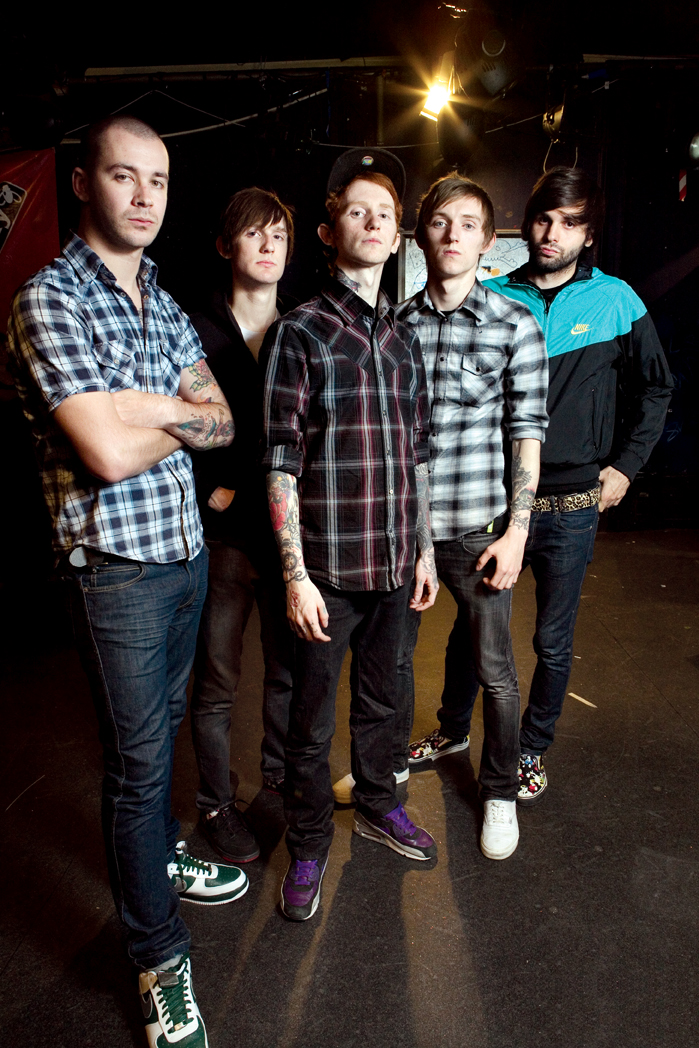
Gallows in 2007, left to right: Gili-Ross, Barratt, Frank Carter, Steph Carter, and Barnard

Gallows' 2007 tour included stops at the South by Southwest showcase festival, Warped Tour 2007, Download Festival, Taste of Chaos, and the Reading Festival, where the band paused its performance so singer Frank Carter could get tattooed onstage by New Found Glory guitarist Chad Gilbert.

The band won the 2007 Kerrang! Award for best British Newcomer.

Their song "In the Belly of a Shark" is featured in Guitar Hero III: Legends of Rock. Another song from the album, "Come Friendly Bombs", is featured in Tony Hawk's Proving Ground.

Gallows' third single, a cover of The Ruts' "Staring at the Rude Bois", was their first UK top 40 single, appearing at number 31 on the chart on 25 November 2007, the track features guest vocals by Lethal Bizzle. The song was featured in the 2008 Jim Carrey film Yes Man. The band in February released a single, "Just Because You Sleep Next to Me Doesn't Mean You're Safe", the video for which was filmed at Emo's in Texas.

In January 2008, the band's show at the House of Blues in Anaheim, California was cancelled after Disney, reportedly after listening to Orchestra of Wolves, chose to ban them from performing.

On 19 July 2008, along with issue 1219 of Kerrang!, Gallows contributed a cover of "Wrathchild" to the Iron Maiden covers compilation album, Maiden Heaven: A Tribute to Iron Maiden.

On 18 August 2008, the song Gold Dust was made available on the band's MySpace profile. They stated that the song would not appear on the second studio album, saying it was "...just a little treat for everyone that's been asking for new Gallows songs for a while."

=== Grey Britain (2008–2011) ===
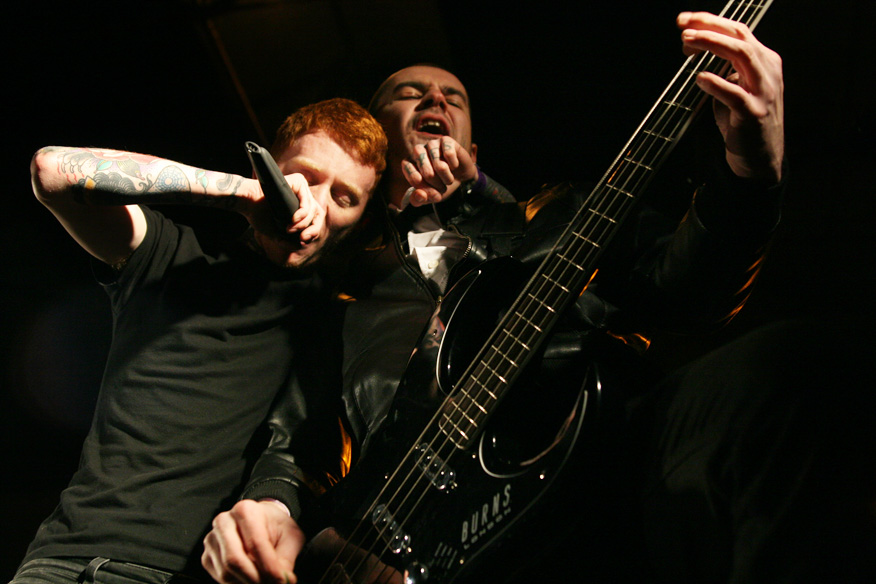
Former singer Frank Carter (left) and bassist Stuart Gili-Ross (right) in 2007

On 5 December 2008, Thrash Hits revealed that the title of Gallows' second album would be Grey Britain. The album was released on 2 May 2009.

To support the album, Gallows performed the entire 2009 Vans Warped Tour. and supported AFI on an American tour. In order to tour with AFI, Gallows postponed shows in Australia and New Zealand.

In December 2009, Gallows mutually parted ways with Warner Brothers.

On 6 June 2010, Gallows played at Rage Against the Machine's victory parade at Finsbury Park in London, UK. They supported Rage Against the Machine and Gogol Bordello at the O2 in Dublin on 7 June 2010.

Gallows played at the Soundwave Festival during late February and early March 2010. They performed on the second stage at the Warrior's Dance Festival at the National Bowl on 24 July 2010, played at the 2010 UK Sonisphere Festival, as well as co-headlining Kent's Hevy Festival on 7 August 2010. They also played Reading and Leeds Festivals 2010 on the Lock Up stage under the pseudonym of The Rats.

On 17 December 2010, the band played at Dingwalls, in Camden, London, during the afternoon, and performed the entire Orchestra of Wolves album. In the evening, they then went on to Camden's Electric Ballroom venue, and played Grey Britain in its entirety, with four members of The Heritage Orchestra. Both shows were recorded for a live DVD.

=== Lineup change, Death Is Birth and self-titled third album (2011–2014) ===
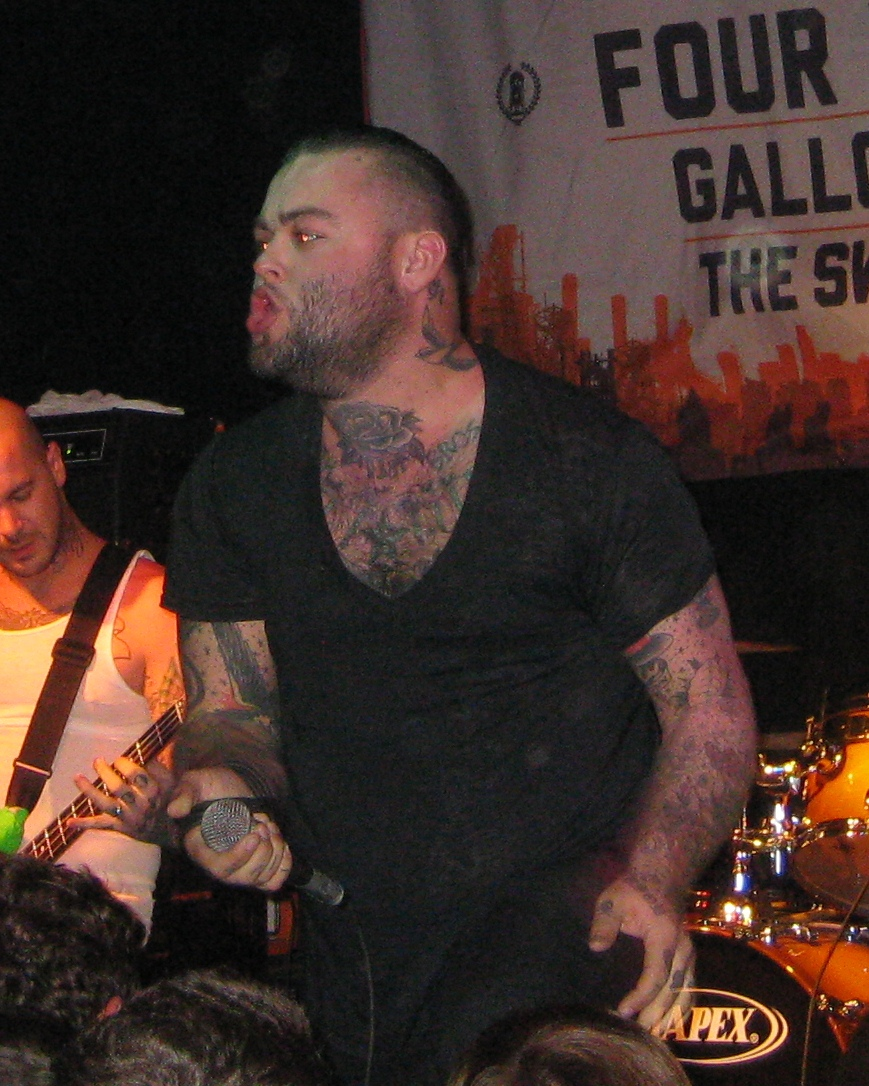
Wade MacNeil, of Alexisonfire, replaced Frank Carter as Gallows' lead singer in 2011.

Frank Carter left Gallows in July 2011, issuing a statement that the band "have hit a crossroads in our writing process and unfortunately myself and the rest of the boys have different ideas regarding the sound of Gallows going forward. Gallows have decided they are going to continue on without me and I wish the boys the best of luck for the future."

Frank's brother and bandmate Steph remarked: "As you all know, we've been in the studio for the past few months working on a follow-up to Grey Britain. It pains me to say that as of 1 August Frank will no longer be a member of Gallows. Creatively, we could not agree on a direction for the new record and came to the conclusion that parting ways was for the best. Frank will be releasing music with his new project Pure Love later this year and we all wish him best. He is and will always be our brother, as well as an integral part of the start of our career." The band made their last festival appearance with Frank at the Sonisphere festival, and he played his final show with Gallows at London ULU on 23 July 2011.

Frank Carter eventually formed another project under the name Frank Carter and the Rattlesnakes, returning to his hardcore punk roots.

Former Alexisonfire guitarist/vocalist Wade MacNeil replaced Carter as Gallows' singer in August 2011, shortly after Alexisonfire announced their disbandment. The band's first recording with MacNeil, the 40-second "True Colours", was released as a free digital download. The 4-song Death Is Birth EP, recorded in Los Angeles with The Bronx guitarist Joby Ford as producer, was released that December through Thirty Days of Night Records.

Gallows began recording their third album, and first with MacNeil, in April 2012. They launched their own record label, Venn Records, through which to release it. The eponymously titled Gallows was released 10 September 2012, and was distributed by Bridge Nine Records in North America. In February 2013 the band announced that they would be continuing as a four-piece, with Steph Carter leaving to focus on his other band, Ghost Riders in the Sky. In July 2014 Gallows played a string of festival shows throughout Europe including Sonisphere Festival at Knebworth, and once again retreated to the studio in Watford to write and record their fourth album.

=== Desolation Sounds (2014–2015) ===
In the summer of 2014 the band completed their fourth album, titled Desolation Sounds, with the release originally planned for November. However, the release date was pushed back, with the album instead being released on 13 April 2015. The album's first single 'Bonfire Season' was debuted on the Radio 1 Rock Show with Daniel P Carter on 11 January, with a release date of 9 February being given for the EP, which will also feature a remix and two bonus cover tracks.

=== Hiatus, other projects and return (2015–present) ===
Gallows played their final show in support of Desolation Sounds on 31 May 2015 at the Rockavaria festival. Following the end of the tour, McNeil reunited with Alexisonfire for a run of live shows, while Barnard joined the band Krokodil and formed a new band, Gold Key. Barratt also founded a new band, Funeral Shakes.

On 16 October 2018 the band's Twitter account posted an 11-second video featuring their logo and dissonant noise. A week later, the band were announced as one of the first eight bands to be part of the 2019 Slam Dunk Festival line-up. Following their appearance at the festival, the band were booked to play both the 2020 and 2021 editions of Reading and Leeds Festivals. However, due to complications relating to the COVID-19 pandemic, they were not able to perform at either.

On 21 September 2023, ex-guitarist Steph Carter was featured on an episode of Sean Smith's Sappenin' podcast and revealed that the band's original lineup had spoken about reuniting for a handful of shows. The plans, however, did not materialise due to undisclosed disagreements within the band.

== Musical style and influences ==
Gallows' music is generally categorised as hardcore punk and post-hardcore. The sound of Grey Britain often bordered metalcore, while Desolation Sounds included elements of post-punk and gothic rock.

In a 2009 article, The Washington Post described them as "a snarling punk quintet from England who mix Motörhead-like riffs with a rage that's born of working-class British bile". They have cited influences including Black Flag, Minor Threat, Swing Kids, JR Ewing, Unbroken, Drive Like Jehu, the Murder City Devils, SSD, Bad Brains, the Stooges, the Clash, Discharge, Cockney Rejects, Turbonegro, Carnival Kids, Refused, Hot Snakes and Black Sabbath.

== Members ==
Final line-up

- Laurent "Lags" Barnard – guitar, backing vocals, keyboards (2004–2015, 2018–2019)
- Stuart Gili-Ross – bass guitar, backing vocals (2004–2015, 2018–2019)
- Lee Barratt – drums, percussion (2004–2015, 2018–2019)
- Wade MacNeil – lead vocals (2011–2015, 2018–2019)

Former members

- Frank Carter – lead vocals (2004–2011)
- Paul Laventure – guitar, backing vocals (2004-2006)
- Steph Carter – guitar, backing vocals (2006–2013)

Timeline

== Discography ==
=== Studio albums ===
Title	Album details	Peak chart positions				Sales	Certifications
Title	Album details	UK	UK Ind.	UK Rock	SCO	Sales	Certifications
Orchestra of Wolves	Released: 25 September 2006; Label: In at the Deep End; Format: LP, CD, download	57	27	3	62	UK: 60,000; US: 9,000	BPI: Silver
Grey Britain	Released: 2 May 2009; Label: Warner Bros.; Format: 2xLP, CD, CD+DVD, download	20	–	–	27	UK: 20,000; WW: 50,000	
Gallows	Released: 10 September 2012; Label: Venn Records; Format: LP, CD, CD+DVD, download	51	8	2	50		
Desolation Sounds	Released: 13 April 2015; Label: Venn Records; Format: LP, CD, download	–	19	10	–		
"—" denotes a recording that did not chart or was not released in that territory

=== EPs ===
Year	EP details
2007	Gallows / November Coming Fire: Released: February 2007; Label: Thirty Days of Night (TDON015); Format: EP
2011	Death Is Birth: Released: 5 December 2011; Label: Thirty Days of Night; Format: EP, download
2015	Bonfire Season: Released: 9 February 2015; Label: Venn Records; Format: EP, download

=== Singles ===
Year	Single	Peak chart positions	Album
Year	Single	UK	Album
2007	"Abandon Ship"	—	Orchestra of Wolves
2007	"In the Belly of a Shark"	56	Orchestra of Wolves
2007	"Staring at the Rude Bois" (with Lethal Bizzle)	31	Orchestra of Wolves
2008	"Just Because You Sleep Next to Me Doesn't Mean You're Safe"	—	Orchestra of Wolves
2008	"Gold Dust"	—	n/a
2009	"The Vulture (Acts I & II)"	—	Grey Britain
2009	"London Is the Reason"	—	Grey Britain
2009	"I Dread the Night"	—	Grey Britain
2009	"Misery"	—	Grey Britain
2011	"True Colours"	—	Death Is Birth
2012	"Last June"	—	Gallows
2014	"Chains"	—	Desolation Sounds
"—" denotes releases that did not chart. "n/a" denotes singles that are not from albums.

=== Other appearances ===
The following Gallows songs were released on compilation albums. This is not an exhaustive list; songs that were first released on the band's albums, EPs, or singles are not included.

Year	Release details	Track(s)
2008	Maiden Heaven: A Tribute to Iron Maiden: Released: 16 July 2008; Label: Kerrang!; Format: CD	"Wrathchild" (originally performed by Iron Maiden)
2017	Still Having Their Say: A Compilation: Released: 10 November 2017; Label: Bridge 9 Records; Format: Digital	"The Possibility of Life's Destruction" (originally performed by Discharge)

=== Music videos ===
Year	Song	Director	Album
2007	"Abandon Ship"		Orchestra of Wolves
2007	"In the Belly of a Shark"		Orchestra of Wolves
2007	"Staring at the Rude Bois"		N/A
2008	"Just Because You Sleep Next to Me Doesn't Mean You're Safe"		Orchestra of Wolves
2009	"The Vulture (Acts I & II)"	Adam Powell	Grey Britain
2009	"London Is the Reason"		Grey Britain
2009	"I Dread the Night"		Grey Britain
2009	"Misery"		Grey Britain
2011	"True Colours"		Death Is Birth
2011	"Mondo Chaos"		Death Is Birth
2012	"Last June"	The Marshall Darlings	Gallows
2012	"Outsider Art"	Stuart Birchall	Gallows
2012	"Cross of Lorraine"		Gallows
2014	"Chains"		Desolation Sounds
2015	"Bonfire Season"		Desolation Sounds
