= Orchestra of Wolves =

Studio album by Gallows
- Released: 25 September 2006
- Genres: Hardcore punk, melodic hardcore
- Length: 35:04
- Label: In at the Deep End
- Producer: Banks

Gallows chronology
Orchestra of Wolves (2006)	Gallows / November Coming Fire (2007)

Alternative cover
- Cover of the Epitaph Records re-release version (July 2007)

Professional ratings
Review scores
Source	Rating
AllMusic	4/5 stars
BBC Online	4/5 stars
Dotmusic	(7/10)
Drowned in Sound	(9/10)
The Guardian	3/5 stars
Kerrang!	4/5 stars
Metal Hammer	(7/10) Issue 158
NME	(9/10)
Playlouder	2.5/5 stars

Orchestra of Wolves is the debut album by English hardcore punk band Gallows. It was produced by Banks of fellow Hertfordshire band Haunts and released by In at the Deep End Records on 25 September 2006. A limited edition was re-issued in the United Kingdom in June 2007 with a bonus disc featuring live session tracks, two new songs and two covers. It was also re-issued in North America by Epitaph Records on July 10, 2007, with four bonus tracks ("Sick of Feeling Sick", "Black Heart Queen", "Nervous Breakdown", and "Staring at the Rude Bois").

Before the recording of this album began, guitarist Paul Laventure left the band. As a result, the album was recorded as a four-piece with Laurent Barnard, the band's main songwriter, recording all of the guitar parts himself.

== Track listing ==
All tracks are written by Gallows (Laurent Barnard, Lee Barratt, Frank Carter, and Stuart Gili-Ross), except where noted.

1. "Kill the Rhythm" 2:40
2. "Come Friendly Bombs" 3:32
3. "Abandon Ship" 3:12
4. "In the Belly of a Shark" 2:42
5. "Six Years" 4:06
6. "Rolling with the Punches" 3:36
7. "Last Fight for the Living Dead" 1:00
8. "Just Because You Sleep Next to Me Doesn't Mean You're Safe" 3:04
9. "Will Someone Shoot That Fucking Snake" 2:28
10. "Stay Cold" 3:07
11. "I Promise This Won't Hurt" 1:48
12. "Orchestra of Wolves" 4:43

=== UK re-issue bonus disc ===
1. "Abandon Ship" (BBC Punk session - 5 April 2007)
2. "Rolling with the Punches" (BBC Punk session - 5 April 2007)
3. "Will Someone Shoot That Fucking Snake" (BBC Punk session - 5 April 2007)
4. "Six Years" (BBC Punk session - 5 April 2007)
5. "Just Because You Sleep Next to Me" (BBC Rock session - 28 December 2006)
6. "In the Belly of a Shark" (BBC Rock session - 28 December 2006)
7. "Sick of Feeling Sick" (originally featured on Gallows / November Coming Fire split EP)
8. "Black Heart Queen" (Previously unreleased)
9. "Nervous Breakdown" (Greg Ginn) (Black Flag cover) / "Staring at the Rude Bois" (Paul Fox, John Jennings, Malcolm Owen, Dave Ruffy) (The Ruts cover featuring Lethal Bizzle) (Hidden Track, 12:06 into the track)

== Certifications ==
Certifications for Orchestra of Wolves
Region	Certification	Certified units/sales
United Kingdom (BPI)	Silver	60,000^{‡}
^{‡} Sales+streaming figures based on certification alone.

== Personnel ==
Gallows

- Frank Carter – lead vocals, co-production
- Laurent Barnard – guitar, vocals, keyboards, co-production
- Lee Barratt – drums, vocals, co-production
- Stuart Gili-Ross – bass guitar, vocals, co-production

Additional contributors

- Banks – production, additional programming, additional vocals
- Alex White (Curtis) We Three Club – layout, design, illustration
- Dan Mumford – illustration
- Jessica X. Morris – additional vocals
- Paul Laventure – additional vocals
- Steph Carter – additional vocals
