= Boston Manor discography =

- Studio albums: 5
- EPs: 5
- Singles: 19
- Music videos: 9
- Split EPs: 1

British Rock band Boston Manor have currently released five studio albums, five EPs and nineteen singles.

== Studio albums ==
List of studio albums
| Title | Album details | Peak chart positions |
| Title | Album details | UK |
|---|---|---|
| Be Nothing | Release: 30 September 2016; Label: Pure Noise; Formats: CD, DL, LP | — |
| Welcome to the Neighbourhood | Release: 7 September 2018; Label: Pure Noise; Formats: CD, DL, LP | 80 |
| Glue | Release: 1 May 2020; Label: Pure Noise; Formats: CD, DL, LP | 97 |
| Datura | Release: 14 October 2022; Label: SharpTone; Formats: CD, DL, LP | — |
| Sundiver | Release: 06 September 2024; Label: SharpTone; Formats: CD, DL, LP | 97 |

== EPs ==
List of extended plays
| Title | Album details |
|---|---|
| Here/Now | Release: 27 July 2013; Label: Never Mend Records; Formats: DL |
| Driftwood | Release: 13 October 2014; Label: Failure By Design Records; Formats: DL |
| Saudade | Release: 20 November 2015; Label: Pure Noise Records; Formats: CD, DL |
| England’s Dreaming (Acoustic) | Release: 19 August 2019; Label: Pure Noise Records; Formats: Streaming |
| Desperate Times Desperate Pleasures | Release: 29 October 2021; Label: SharpTone Records; Formats: Streaming, Cassette, LP |

== Split EPs ==
List of extended plays
| Title | Album details |
|---|---|
| Boston Manor / Throwing Stuff | Release: 31 March 2014; Label: Aaahh!!! Real Records; Formats: CD, DL, LP |

== Singles ==
| Title | Year | Album |
|---|---|---|
| ”Trapped Nerve“ | 2015 | Saudade |
| ”Gone” | 2016 | Saudade |
| ”Laika” | 2016 | Be Nothing |
| ”Lead Feet“ | 2016 | Be Nothing |
| ”Cu“ | 2017 | Be Nothing |
| ”Drowned In Gold” | 2017 | Non-album single |
| ”Halo” | 2018 | Welcome to the Neighbourhood |
| ”Bad Machine” | 2018 | Welcome to the Neighbourhood |
| ”England’s Dreaming” | 2018 | Welcome to the Neighbourhood |
| ”Liquid“ (featuring John Floreani) | 2019 | Glue |
| "England’s Dreaming (Acoustic)” | 2019 | Non-album single |
| "Carbon Mono” | 2021 | Desperate Times, Desperate Pleasures |
| "Algorithm” | 2021 | Desperate Times, Desperate Pleasures |
| "Desperate Pleasures” | 2021 | Desperate Times, Desperate Pleasures |
| "Algorithm (Acoustic)” | 2022 | Non-album single |
| "Foxglove” | 2022 | Datura |
| "Inertia” | 2022 | Datura |
| "Container” | 2024 | Sundiver |
| "Sliding Doors” | 2024 | Sundiver |

=== Other songs ===
| Title | Year | Album |
|---|---|---|
| ”Heathens” (Twenty One Pilots cover) | 2017 | Punk Goes Pop Vol. 7 |

== Music videos ==
| Title | Year | Album | Director | Type | Link |
|---|---|---|---|---|---|
| ”Trapped Nerve“ | 2015 | Saudade | Chris Porter | Narrative | |
| ”Gone” | 2016 | Saudade | Unknown | Performance | |
| ”Laika” | 2016 | Be Nothing | Unknown | Narrative | |
| ”Lead Feet“ | 2016 | Be Nothing | Unknown | Narrative | |
| ”Cu” | 2017 | Be Nothing | Unknown | Narrative | |
| ”Drowned In Gold“ | 2017 | Non-album single | Unknown | Performance | |
| ”Halo” | 2018 | Welcome to the Neighbourhood | Unknown | Performance | |
| ”Bad Machine” | 2018 | Welcome to the Neighbourhood | Henry Cox | Narrative | |
| "Liquid (ft. John Floreani)“ | 2019 | GLUE | POLYGON | Narrative | |
| "Everything is Ordinary“ | 2020 | GLUE | Unknown | Performance | |
| "Plasticine Dreams“ | 2020 | GLUE | Jason Bacon, Rob Shaw | Narrative | |
| "Carbon Mono“ | 2021 | Desperate Times, Desperate Pleasures | Zak Pinchin | Narrative | |
| "Desperate Pleasures“ | 2021 | Desperate Times, Desperate Pleasures | Zak Pinchin | Narrative/Performance | |
| "Foxglove“ | 2022 | Datura | Zak Pinchin | Narrative | |
| "Container“ | 2024 | Sundiver | Zak Pinchin | Narrative/Performance | |
| "Sliding Doors“ | 2024 | Sundiver | Zak Pinchin | Narrative/Performance | |
| "Heat Me Up“ | 2024 | Sundiver | Zak Pinchin | Performance | |
