= Floreani =

Floreani is a surname. Notable people with the surname include:

- Enzo Floreani (born 1945), Australian politician
- John Floreani (born 1991), Australian singer and musician
