= Frank Carter (musician) =

English musician and tattoo artist (born 1984)

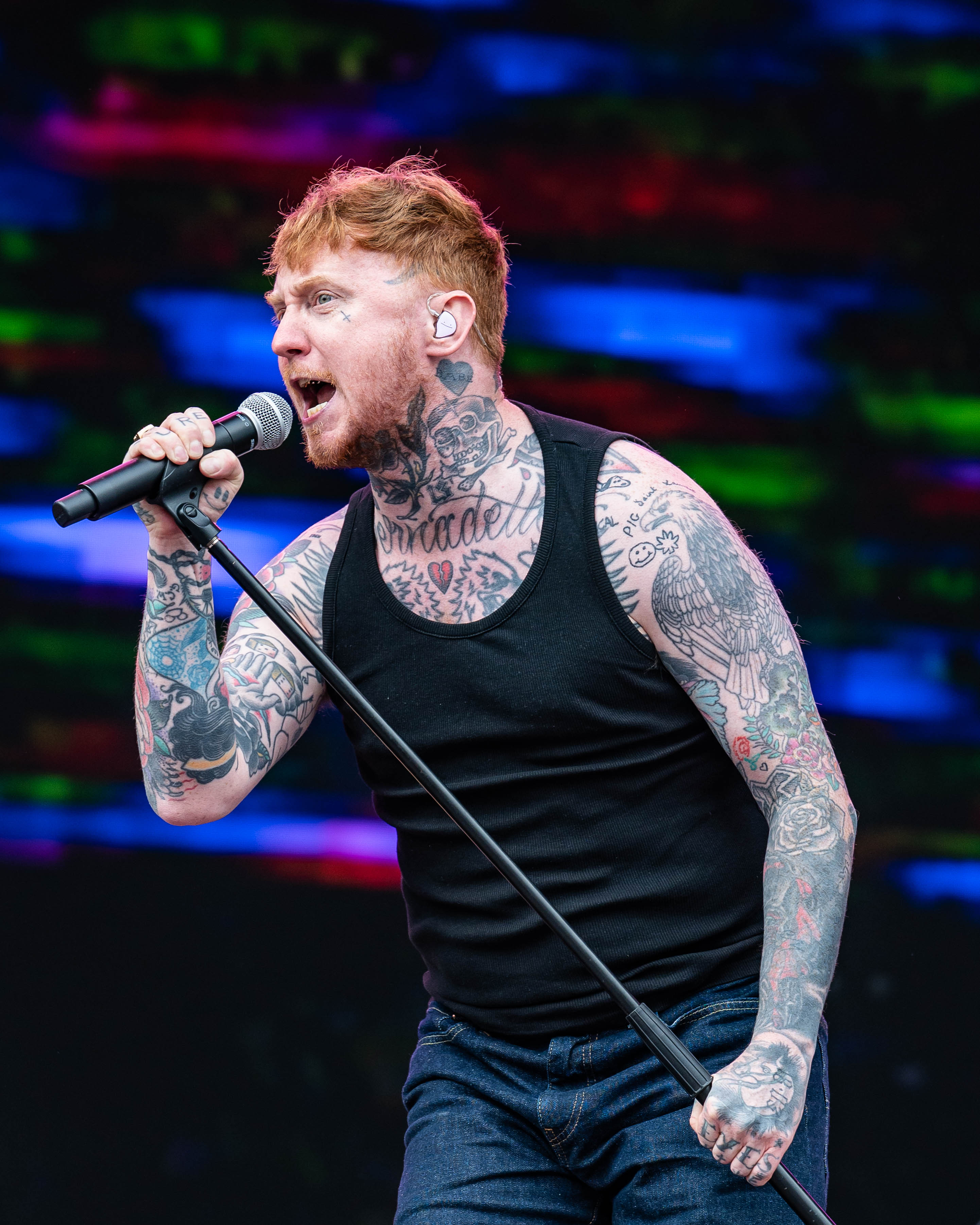
- Frank Carter performing with the Sex Pistols at Tons of Rock in Oslo, Norway, in 2025

Background information
- Born: Christopher Frank Carter; 27 April 1984 (age 42); Hemel Hempstead, Hertfordshire, England
- Genres: Hardcore punk; punk rock; alternative rock
- Occupation: Musician
- Instruments: Vocals; guitar
- Years active: 2005–present
- Labels: In at the Deep End; Epitaph; Warner; Vertigo; Mercury; International Death Cult
- Member of: Frank Carter & the Rattlesnakes
- Formerly of: Gallows; Pure Love

Christopher Frank Carter (born 27 April 1984) is an English musician and tattoo artist, who has been a part of the musical groups Gallows, Pure Love and Frank Carter and the Rattlesnakes. He currently performs alongside the Sex Pistols. According to The Independent's Nick Hasted, Carter is renowned for his "ferocious live presence" and "confrontational image".

== Biography ==
=== Early life ===
Carter grew up in Hemel Hempstead in England. His mother was an Irish dance teacher and his father was a DJ. He is the eldest of four brothers, including Steph Carter, who would play guitar in Gallows along with Frank, and Richard Carter who would eventually form the band Blackhole. His parents divorced when Carter was in his teens, which led to him discovering punk rock music.

From a young age, Carter had a passion for music and art. He formed his first band called All Night Drive at 16, where he was given the choice to either learn an instrument or become a frontman, to which he decided to be the group's vocalist. After high school, he went to art college. However, Carter dropped out as he felt he was "not learning anything"; this led to him pursuing a career as a tattoo artist. He is currently an artist at Rose of Mercy in London.

=== Gallows: 2005–2011 ===
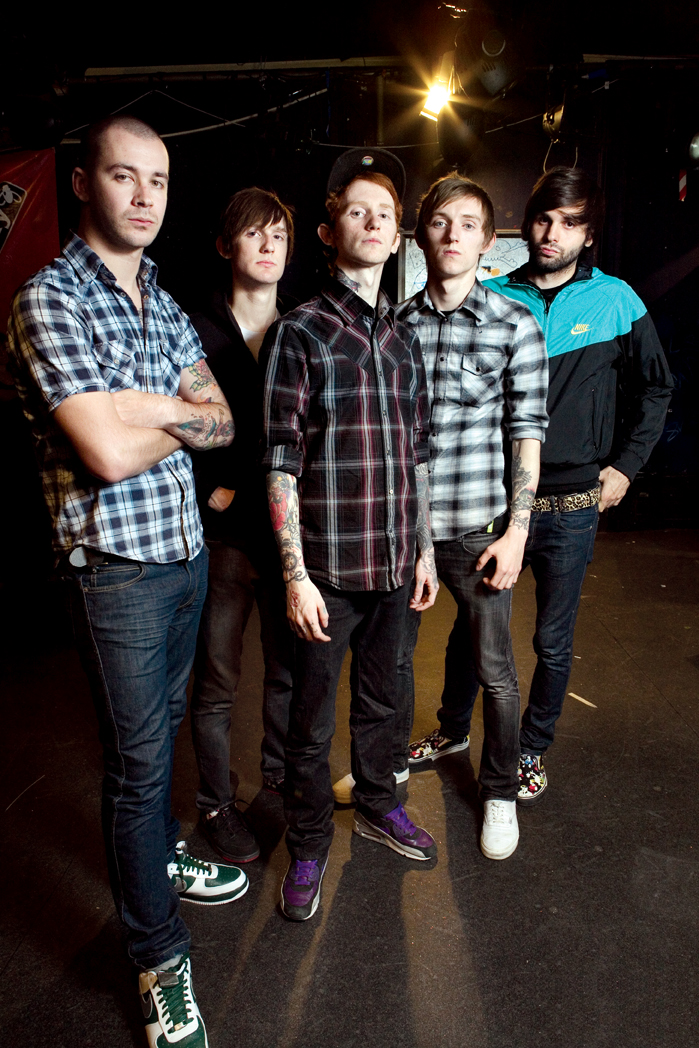
Gallows in 2007

Carter formed Gallows in 2005, influenced by the music of hardcore punk bands Black Flag, Minor Threat, Swing Kids and JR Ewing. They released their debut album Orchestra of Wolves on 25 September 2006 through In at the Deep End Records in the U.K. and Epitaph Records in the U.S. The album peaked at number 57 on the U.K. charts.

In March 2007, Gallows signed a deal with Warner Bros Records, making them the first British hardcore punk band to sign to a major label. In September, Gallows toured with Lethal Bizzle alongside additional opening acts Poison the Well and Blackhole. Carter's brother Richard took over for one of the performances in Inverness due to his "waves of concussion" and persistent bleeding from the band's performance the previous night at Stoke On Trent. Richard began being abused by the crowd, which led to Frank getting into a physical altercation with multiple members of the crowd and the subsequent cancellation of the next two dates of the tour.

On 2 May 2009, Gallows released their second album Grey Britain, which was a concept album based around post–2008 financial crisis Britain, which was "centered on a world of emboldened racism, xenophobia, knife crime and inescapable mental illness". It peaked at number 20 on the U.K. charts. The album led to Warner Bros dropping the group due to them believing it to be too confrontational politically. In 2011, Carter departed from Gallows due to creative differences and tensions within the band.

=== Pure Love: 2011–2014 ===
Carter formed Pure Love in 2011, with The Hope Conspiracy and The Suicide File guitarist Jim Carroll, after the pair had run into one another multiple times at local New York City bars. The pair bonded over how neither felt a connection anymore to hardcore and punk, with Carter saying they simply wanted to "play fun rock’n’roll music without any of the stress". The pair released their debut album Anthems on 4 February 2013 through Vertigo and Mercury Records. The album's work was consciously different to Carter's work with Gallows, by making use of distinctive hooks and influences from classic rock. On 10 February 2014, Pure Love announced that they would be going on an "indefinite hiatus", due to a "hard year".

=== Frank Carter & the Rattlesnakes: 2015–present ===
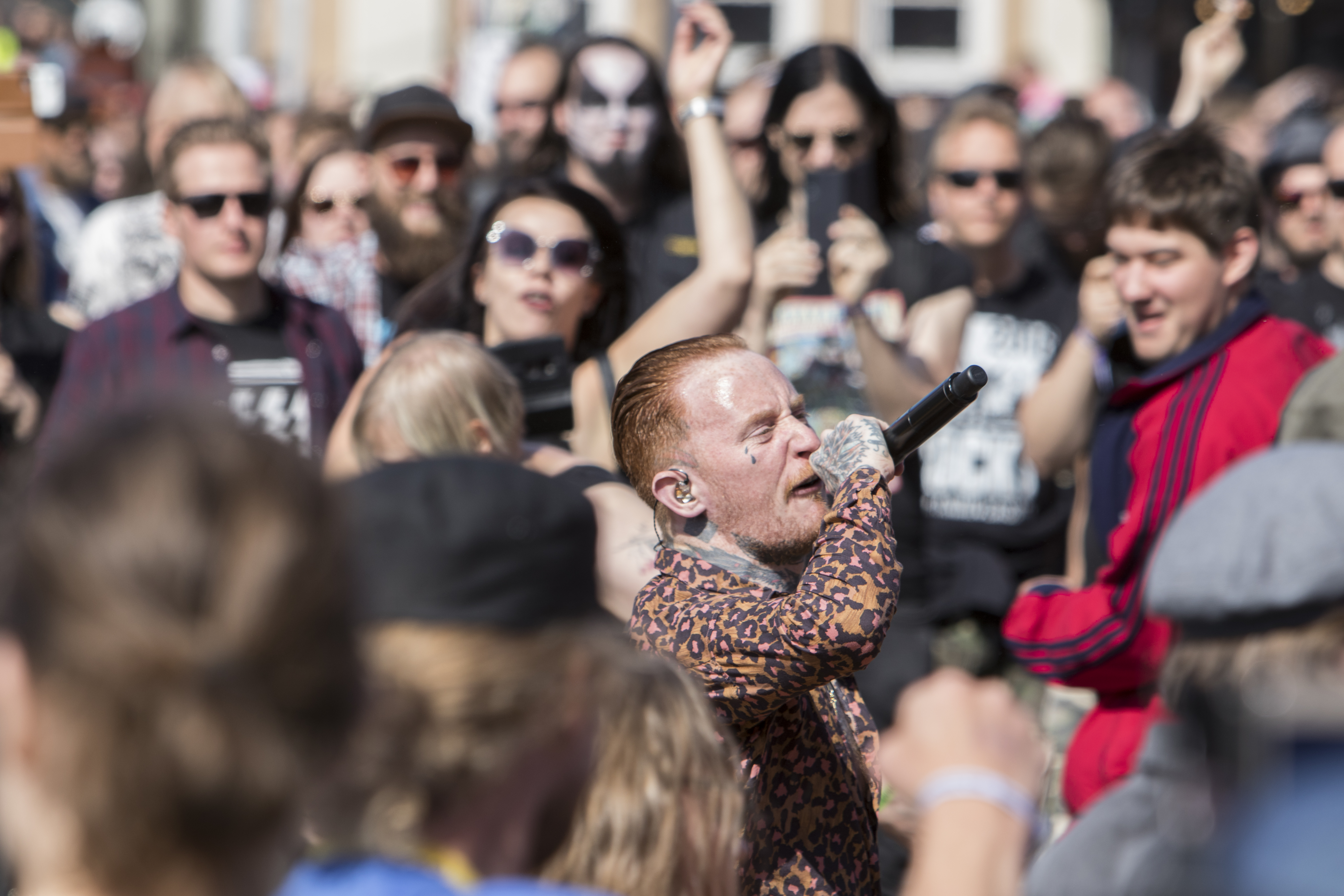
Carter performing with the Rattlesnakes in 2019

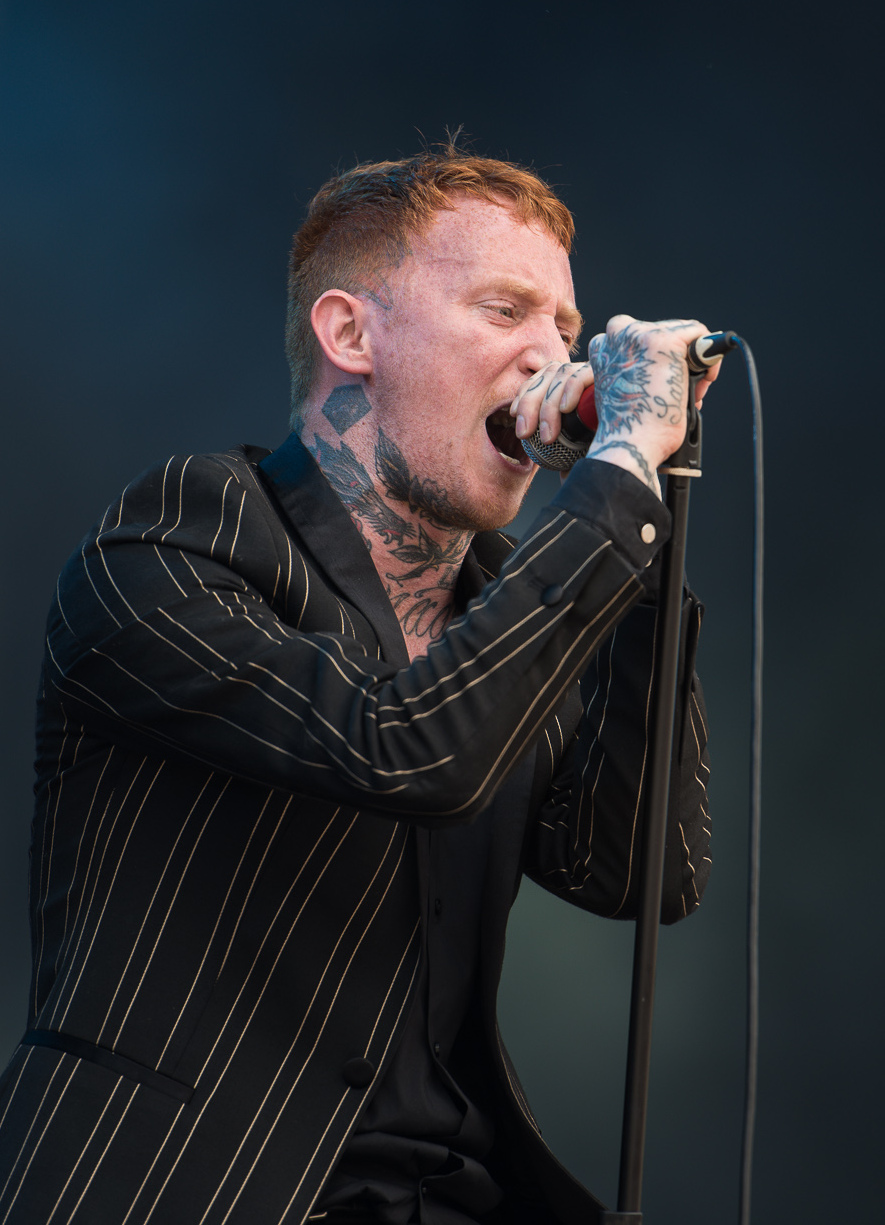
Carter performing with The Rattlesnakes in 2017

In April 2015, Carter announced the formation of a new band called Frank Carter & the Rattlesnakes, which at the time he described as a return to his "hardcore roots". On 14 September 2015, the Rattlesnakes released their debut album Blossom, through International Death Cult. In a review by Metal Hammer, writer Thea de Gallier described how Carter "may be a grown-up and a dad now, but he’s still capable of being a figurehead for the pissed-off youth who are too young to have had the Sex Pistols". The album peaked at number 18 on the U.K. charts.

On 20 January 2017, the Rattlesnakes released their second album Modern Ruin through International Death Cult. It debuted at number seven on the U.K. albums chart. The album retained the aggression and hardcore sensibilities of the band's previous effort, however also incorporated elements from Carter's previous project Pure Love. In an interview with Kerrang!, Carter stated that much of the album had been based around the alcoholism that he had experienced after breaking his straight edge lifestyle of twelve years on Christmas 2015.

On 3 May 2019, the Rattlesnakes released their third album End of Suffering through the label International Death Cult. It peaked at number 4 on the U.K. charts. On 6 June, Carter was featured on the cover of the Armed's single titled "Ft. Frank Turner", which in fact featured Frank Turner, not Carter. On 23 and 25 August, he performed as second support at Reading and Leeds Festivals with the Rattlesnakes, the highest he'd ever been billed for the festivals. On 19 September, he was involved in a life-threatening car crash in Devon, which led to the cancellation of the first week of the Rattlesnakes' scheduled U.S. tour. On 11 October, he was featured on Can't Swim's track "Power". On 29 November, Black Futures released a collaborative remix of the Rattlesnakes' song "Crowbar".

=== Frank Carter and the Sex Pistols: 2024–present ===
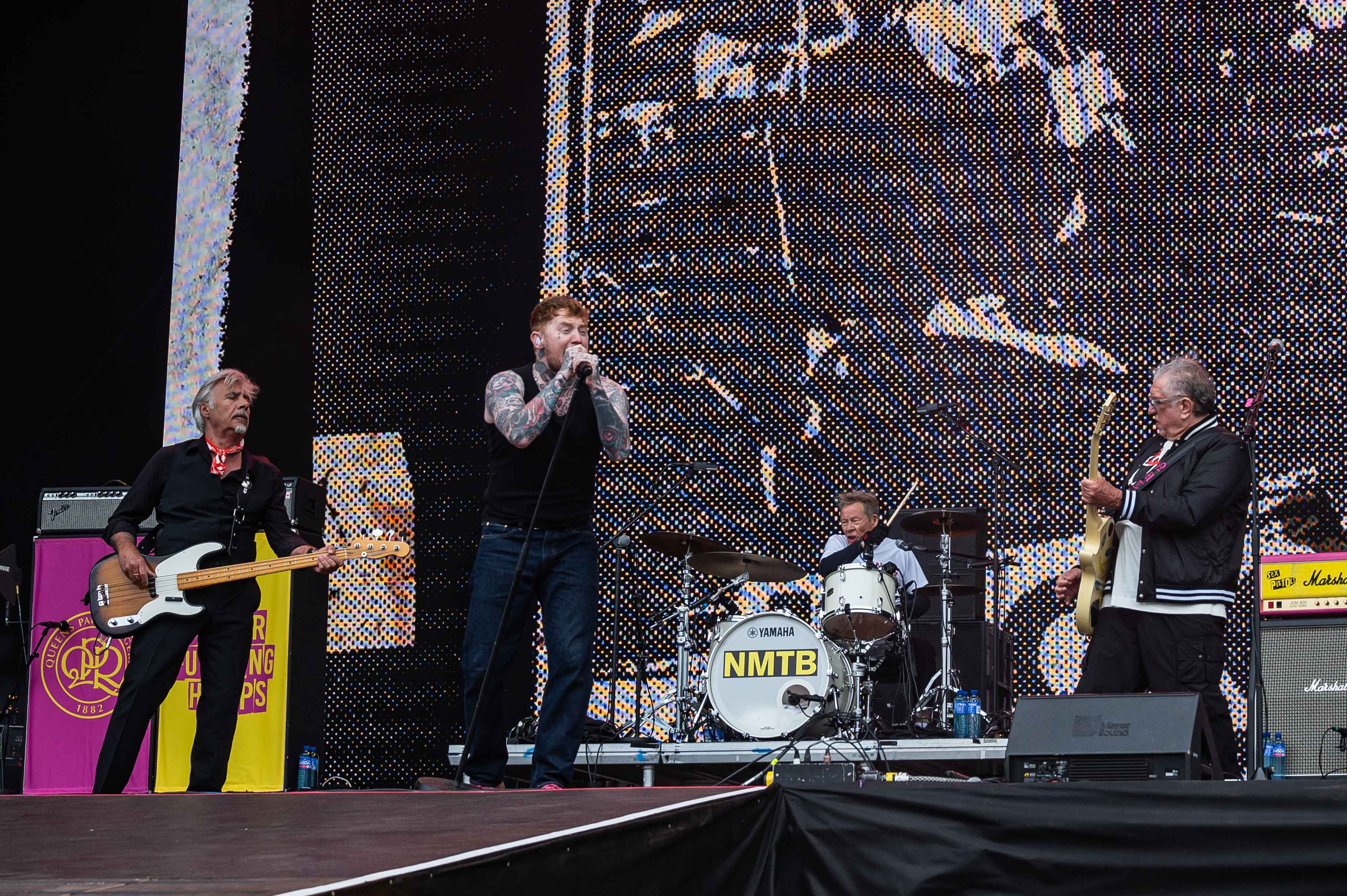
Carter with Sex Pistols at Tons of Rock in Oslo, Norway, 2025

On 3 June 2024, it was announced that Carter would perform with Steve Jones, Glen Matlock, and Paul Cook in a fundraiser reunion for the Sex Pistols playing two shows on 13 and 14 August. Held at Bush Hall in Shepherd's Bush, the shows were billed as "Frank Carter And Three Members Of The Sex Pistols" or simply "Frank Carter And Sex Pistols". This was followed up with a short Never Mind The Bollocks UK tour from 20 to 26 September including five shows in Nottingham, Birmingham, Glasgow, Manchester and London during which they played the Never Mind the Bollocks album in full each night.

In January 2025, the band announced it would commence an Australian and New Zealand "Never Mind The Bollocks" tour in April 2025.

== Personal life ==
Carter followed a straight edge lifestyle beginning in 2003, but he ended his sobriety on Christmas 2015. For some time after that, he struggled with alcohol and substance abuse, and has since returned to sobriety as of September 2022.

He is outspoken about his struggle with anxiety. In an interview with Music Feeds he stated that the struggle had been present since he was seven years old.

He was married to Scottish tattoo artist Sarah Carter Schor; however, the pair divorced in early 2018. They have one child together, their daughter Mercy Rose Carter.

== Discography ==
With Gallows

- Orchestra of Wolves (2006)
- Grey Britain (2009)

With Pure Love

- Anthems (2013)

With the Rattlesnakes

- Blossom (2015)
- Modern Ruin (2017)
- End of Suffering (2019)
- Sticky (2021)
- Dark Rainbow (2024)
