= Sticky (Frank Carter and the Rattlesnakes album) =

Studio album by Frank Carter and the Rattlesnakes
- Released: 15 October 2021
- Genre: Punk rock
- Length: 28:27
- Label: International Death Cult
- Producer: Dean Richardson

Frank Carter and the Rattlesnakes chronology
End of Suffering (2019)	Sticky (2021)	Dark Rainbow (2024)

Singles from Sticky
- 1. "My Town" Released: 27 April 2021; 2. "Sticky" Released: 4 July 2021; 3. "Go Get a Tattoo" Released: 10 August 2021; 4. "Off with His Head" Released: 4 October 2021

Professional ratings
Aggregate scores
Source	Rating
Metacritic	78/100
Review scores
Source	Rating
DIY	4/5 stars
Kerrang!	4/5 stars
The Line of Best Fit	8/10
Louder than War	9/10
NME	4/5 stars
Sputnikmusic	1.5/5 stars

Sticky is the fourth studio album by British rock band Frank Carter and the Rattlesnakes, released on 15 October 2021 through International Death Cult.

It was elected by Loudwire as the 44th best rock/metal album of 2021.

== Background and production ==
In 2019, Frank Carter and the Rattlesnakes released their third album, End of Suffering, undertaking a concert tour to support the record. This tour culminated in a sold-out performance to 10,000 fans at London's Alexandra Palace in February 2020. However, further tour plans were scuppered by the COVID-19 pandemic, forcing a premature end to the tour as lockdown measures took hold across the world indefinitely. With the exception of a deluxe reissue of their debut album Blossom, on 23 October and a livestream concert hosted at the Brixton Academy on 13 November, the remainder of 2020 was a period of relative inactivity for the group.

In June 2021, the band headlined the first day of the UK Download Festival Pilot (an event hosted in collaboration with the UK Government's Event Research Programme in an effort to reopen the live music economy following the COVID-19 pandemic), playing three new songs in their set. The first of these was "My Town", which was previously released in April 2021, and two previously unreleased tracks titled "Go Get a Tattoo" and "Off with His Head" (later released in August and October 2021 respectively).

Sticky was recorded throughout lockdown, with guitarist and primary band member Dean Richardson acting as producer on the record and features guest appearances from Lynks, Cassyette, Joe Talbot and Bobby Gillespie. Speaking about "My Town" following its April 2021 release, Carter stated that it was about "our collective mental health falling apart" under lockdown, further elaborating that "it's easy to dissociate when it's someone else's problem but we are each responsible for keeping the streets clean, looking out for our fellow neighbors and acting with kindness and respect as we walk through life. We can look into this town and see the seedy underbelly, the dirt, the disdain, the undercurrent of hate and despair. And then we are reminded that 'My Town' looks just like yours, and no one gives a fuck at all and if we don't start looking after ourselves soon then we are all going to be in big trouble."

Upon its release in October 2021, Carter described "Off with His Head" as a "scathing generalised attack on trolls" within "patriarchal society", branding such society as "a plague" with "strict regulations regarding who and how it benefits and is unique in its ability to oppress people at the exact same time it benefits them".

Following the album's announcement in July 2021, Carter outlined the themes behind the record's title track, saying it was about "that moment where you're drunk at a bus stop at 3AM. You know there are no more buses, but you sit there anyway because you're too fucked to figure out your options. Your kebab is on the floor, there's a Stella in your pocket, and you're woken up by a dirty little fox eating your shoes." Further elaborating on the record's themes in October 2021, Carter said “Someone described it to me as 'they felt their youth' when they were listening to the record. When you make albums, those are the ones you want to make. Nostalgic, but classic. Timeless, and also modern."

== Release and promotion ==
The first single from the album was "My Town", released on 27 April 2021. The track features a verse sung by Idles' frontman Joe Talbot, who features in the song's music video and also joined Carter and the rest of the band onstage to perform the song at the Download pilot in June 2021. The eponymous second single was released on 4 July, receiving its debut radio play on Dan P. Carter's BBC Radio 1 show the same day. The single was accompanied by the announcement of a 12-date tour of the UK and Ireland scheduled to take place throughout November 2021, with further dates in London and Europe in January and February 2022. The album's third single, "Go Get a Tattoo", was released on 10 August; the track features electronic artist Lynks, described by Carter as "the most exciting person in music right now." On 4 October, "Off with His Head" featuring Cassyette was released as the album's fourth single.

Sticky was released on 15 October through International Death Cult.

== Track listing ==
Sticky track listing
No.	Title	Length
1.	"Sticky"	2:34
2.	"Cupid's Arrow"	3:33
3.	"Bang Bang" (featuring Lynks)	2:45
4.	"Take It to the Brink"	2:37
5.	"My Town" (featuring Joe Talbot)	2:44
6.	"Go Get a Tattoo" (featuring Lynks)	2:38
7.	"Off with His Head" (featuring Cassyette)	2:37
8.	"Cobra Queen"	3:15
9.	"Rat Race"	2:24
10.	"Original Sin" (featuring Bobby Gillespie)	3:20
Total length:		28:27

== Personnel ==
Credits adapted from album liner notes

Frank Carter and the Rattlesnakes

- Frank Carter – vocals, additional illustrations
- Dean Richardson – guitars, production
- Tom 'Tank' Barclay – bass
- Gareth Grover – drums, additional production (tracks 1, 8)

Additional musicians

- Lynks – guest vocals (track 3, 6)
- Joe Talbot – guest vocals (track 5)
- Cassyette – guest vocals (track 7)
- Bobby Gillespie – guest vocals (track 10)
- Yasmin Ogilvie – saxophone (tracks 3, 9, 10)

Production

- Daniel Moyler – engineering, programming
- Mark Rankin – mixing
- Mike Marsh – mastering
- Kwes Darko – additional production (tracks 4, 5)
- Luke Pickering – additional engineering (track 6)
- Andrea Mastroiacova – assistant engineer
- Alex Montgomery – assistant engineer

Additional personnel

- YUCK – artwork, creative direction
- Jenny Brough – photography
- James Williams – additional illustrations

== Charts ==
Chart performance for Sticky
Chart (2021)	Peak position
Belgian Albums (Ultratop Flanders)	189
German Albums (Offizielle Top 100)	27
Scottish Albums (OCC)	5
UK Albums (OCC)	8
UK Independent Albums (OCC)	2
