= Suicide and Sunshine =

Studio album by Trophy Eyes
- Released: 23 June 2023
- Studio: Studio 28, Thailand
- Length: 40:16
- Label: Hopeless
- Producer: Shane Edwards; Fletcher Matthews

Trophy Eyes chronology
The American Dream (2018)	Suicide and Sunshine (2023)

Singles from Suicide and Sunshine
- 1. "Blue Eyed Boy" Released: 3 March 2023; 2. "What Hurts The Most" Released: 12 April 2023; 3. "Kill" Released: 3 May 2023; 4. "Life in Slow Motion" Released: 31 May 2023; 5. "People Like You" Released: 21 June 2023

Suicide and Sunshine is the fourth studio album by Australian punk rock band, Trophy Eyes, released on 23 June 2023 by Hopeless Records. It was produced by Shane Edwards and Fletcher Matthews at Studio 28 in Bangkok, Thailand.

== Background and promotion ==
Suicide and Sunshine began as a sort of swansong of sorts for the band of ten years, having decided to break up amid the COVID-19 pandemic. According to John Floreani, "A lot of what we were doing [on this album] is just expressing ourselves freely".

The title of the album, Suicide and Sunshine', comes from 'Sean', a track detailing the heartbreak Floreani experienced after his friend ended his life. According to Floreani, it was sunny when he heard of Sean's passing.

The first single from Suicide and Sunshine, "Blue Eyed Boy", was released on 3 March 2023 along with an accompanying music video.

== Track listing ==
All tracks are written by Trophy Eyes.

Suicide and Sunshine track listing
No.	Title	Length
1.	"Sydney"	0:59
2.	"Life in Slow Motion"	3:11
3.	"People Like You"	3:12
4.	"My Inheritance"	2:54
5.	"Blue Eyed Boy"	2:57
6.	"Runaway, Come Home"	3:03
7.	"Burden"	0:54
8.	"Sean"	5:00
9.	"What Hurts the Most"	3:25
10.	"OMW"	2:52
11.	"Kill"	3:04
12.	"Sweet Soft Sound"	2:41
13.	"Stay Here"	2:53
14.	"Epilogue"	3:07
Total length:		40:16

== Personnel ==
Credits retrieved from AllMusic.

=== Trophy Eyes ===
- John Floreani - lead vocals
- Andrew Hallett - guitars
- Jeremy Winchester - bass
- Blake Caruso - drums

== Charts ==
Chart performance for Suicide and Sunshine
Chart (2023)	Peak position
Australian Albums (ARIA)	8
