= Dark Rainbow =

Studio album by Frank Carter and the Rattlesnakes
- Released: 26 January 2024
- Length: 38:15
- Label: International Death Cult; AWAL
- Producer: Dean Richardson; Cam Blackwood

Frank Carter and the Rattlesnakes chronology
Sticky (2021)	Dark Rainbow (2024)

Dark Rainbow is the fifth studio album by British rock band Frank Carter and the Rattlesnakes, released on 26 January 2024 through International Death Cult and AWAL. It received positive reviews from critics.

== Critical reception ==
Professional ratings
Aggregate scores
Source	Rating
Metacritic	71/100
Review scores
Source	Rating
DIY	4/5 stars
Kerrang!	4/5
Mojo	3/5 stars
MusicOMH	3.5/5 stars
Sputnikmusic	3.7/5

Dark Rainbow received a score of 71 out of 100 on review aggregator Metacritic based on five critics' reviews, indicating "generally favorable" reception. Mojo stated that "After the initial shock, the pair's songwriting smarts cuts through persuasively, alongside strong messaging about acknowledging your needs and vulnerabilities". Jack Terry of DIY felt that the album "sounds like many of the best bits of each of their previous records" and also wrote that "the eleven tracks here are perhaps their most consistent and level to date [...] it seems they're keeping themselves well oiled".

Kerrang!'s Mark Sutherland stated that it is "the sheer quality of the songs that is the most seductive thing here" as it is "augmented with pianos, synths and strings, heavy with mature power ballads and emotionally charged throughout". Reviewing the album for MusicOMH, Russ Horton wrote that it "set[s] a tone of self-evaluation and reflection" and "ranges from delightful weirdness to gloriously anthemic bombast" and while "a significant improvement on their last album", it "doesn't quite hit the heights they've previously shown themselves to be capable of". Simon K. of Sputnikmusic called it "easily the best Rattlesnakes album since Modern Ruin" with "sashaying, fuzzed-out rock grooves, retro-esque synths, dour ballads, and a creeping psychedelic undercurrent [being] the main order of the day, and while the guitar aspect of the record certainly has the most derivative aspects, it's all pulled off pretty well".

== Track listing ==
All lyrics are written by Frank Carter; all music is composed by Frank Carter, Cameron Blackwood, and Dean Richardson.

Dark Rainbow track listing
No.	Title	Length
1.	"Honey"	2:32
2.	"Man of the Hour"	3:01
3.	"Can I Take You Home"	3:15
4.	"American Spirit"	3:38
5.	"Happier Days"	3:36
6.	"Brambles"	3:32
7.	"Queen of Hearts"	3:48
8.	"Sun Bright Golden Happening"	3:32
9.	"Superstar"	3:14
10.	"Self Love"	3:21
11.	"A Dark Rainbow"	4:46
Total length:		38:15

== Personnel ==
Frank Carter and the Rattlesnakes

- Frank Carter – vocals (all tracks), keyboards (track 3), creative direction, illustrations
- Dean Richardson – guitar, programming, production (all tracks); keyboards (tracks 2, 3, 7, 8, 10)

Additional musicians

- Tank Barclay – bass guitar
- Gareth Grover – drums
- Elliot Russell – guitar
- Lorna Blackwood – backing vocals
- Ronan Sherlock – violin (tracks 1, 5, 6, 11)
- Cam Blackwood – keyboards (track 4)
- Simon Richardson – acoustic guitar (track 5)
- Yasmin Ogilvie – saxophone (track 8)

Technical

- Matt Colton – mastering
- Caesar Edmunds – mixing
- Lorna Blackwood – vocal production
- Daniel Moyler – drums, bass, synthesizer, and piano engineering
- Elliot Russell – guitar engineering
- Luis Howes – vocal engineering

Visuals

- Ben Wood – artwork, design
- Pamela Coleman Smith – illustrations
- Brian Rankin – photography
- Ed Mason – photography

== Charts ==
Chart performance for Dark Rainbow
Chart (2024)	Peak position
Scottish Albums (OCC)	5
UK Albums (OCC)	10
UK Independent Albums (OCC)	4
