= Trophy Eyes =

Australian punk rock band

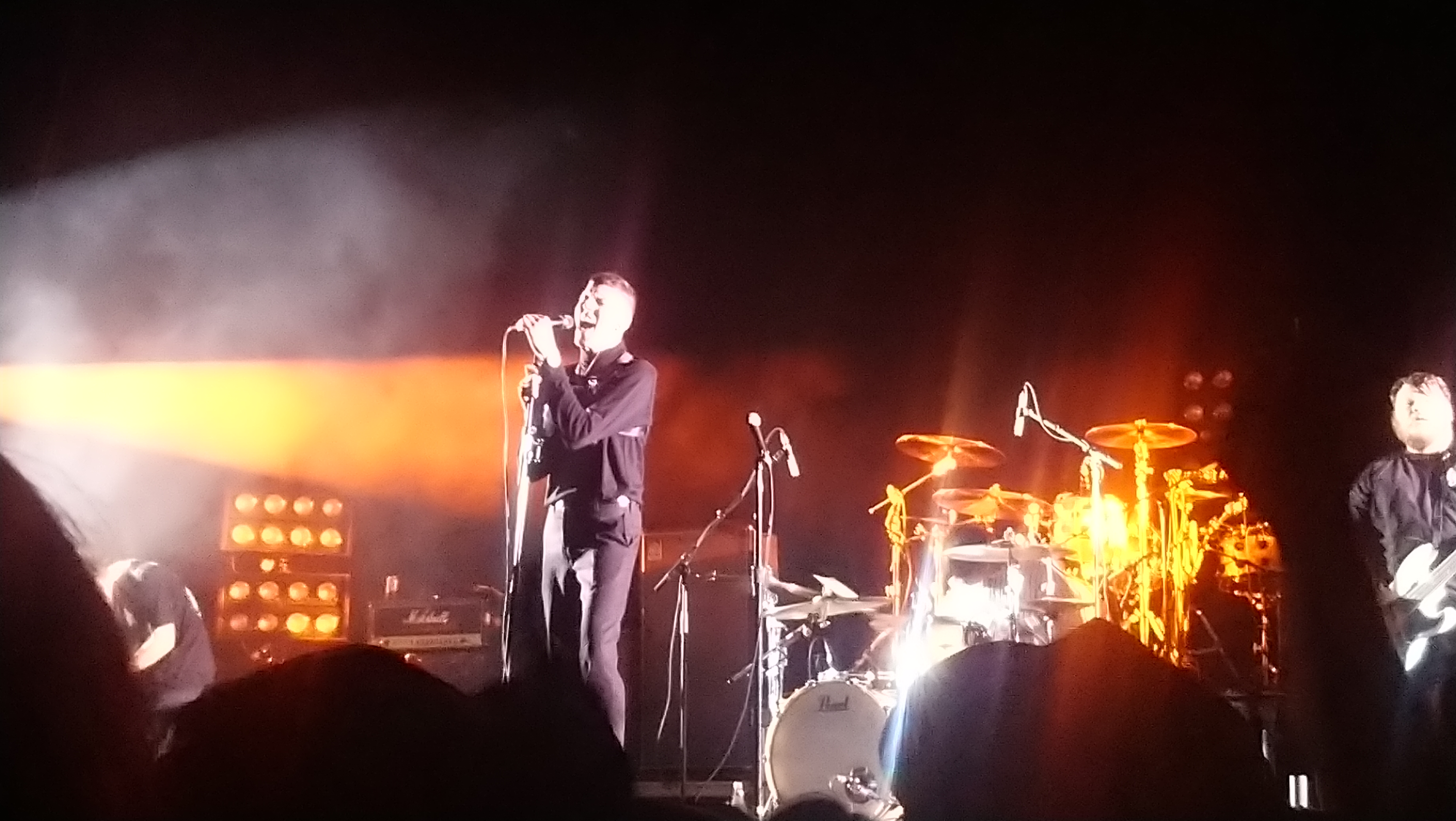

Background information
- Origin: Newcastle, New South Wales, Australia
- Genres: Melodic hardcore; emo; punk rock; pop punk
- Years active: 2013–present
- Label: Hopeless
- Members: John Floreani; Jeremy Winchester; Blake Caruso; Josh Campiao
- Past members: Callum Cramp; Kevin Cross; Andrew Hallet
- Website: trophyeyesmusic.com

Trophy Eyes is an Australian punk rock band from Newcastle, formed in 2013. They were last signed to Hopeless Records. The band currently consists of vocalist John Floreani, bassist and backing vocalist Jeremy Winchester, lead guitarist Josh Campiao, and drummer Blake Caruso. Their single "Hurt" was ranked No. 135 on Triple J's Hottest 100. Other Hottest 100 appearances include No. 101 in 2016 with "Chlorine" and No. 93 in 2018 with "You Can Count on Me". To date, they have released four studio albums: Mend, Move On (2014), Chemical Miracle (2016), The American Dream (2018) and Suicide and Sunshine (2023).

== Career ==
=== Early years and Everything Goes Away (2013–2014) ===
Trophy Eyes was formed in 2013 by Andrew Hallett on lead guitar, Kevin Cross on rhythm guitar, Jeremy Winchester on bass and backing vocals, Callum Cramp on drums, and John Floreani on vocals. They later released an EP, Demo 2013, on 8 April 2013, which consisted of two tracks, "Chacho" and "Personal Taste". Everything Goes Away has five songs and it was written about a period of his life during which he lived in his high school town prior to moving to Newcastle. Originally released 11 November 2013, it wasn't published on streaming platforms until April 29 the following year. On the same day, a music video for their single "Hourglass" was released.

=== Mend, Move On and Chemical Miracle (2014–2016) ===
On 17 September, their single "In Return" was released alongside an accompanying music video. On 9 October, they released a second single "White Curtains" and another music video. On 24 October, their third single "Penfold State Forest" was released.

In just under a year after the release of Everything Goes Away, they released their debut studio album, Mend, Move On was released on 4 November 2014 under Hopeless Records. The album was recorded at Karma Sound Studios in Thailand with Shane Edwards, as would their next two albums.

The band released a non-album single called "Tired Hearts" in September 2015.

Trophy Eyes performed at the 2015 Vans Warped Tour on the Hard Rock stage and Full Sail stage. They shared a stage with bands like Emarosa, Have Mercy, Knuckle Puck, and Palisades.

The band's sophomore studio album, Chemical Miracle released on 14 October 2016. Like their previous album, it was recorded in Thailand by Shane Edwards.

=== Cramp's departure and The American Dream (2017–2019) ===
At Warped Tour 2017, they played alongside bands such as Knocked Loose, Boston Manor, and Movements. They have also toured the United Kingdom with Welsh band Neck Deep, American band Knuckle Puck and Canadian band Seaway on the Intercontinental Championships Tour. This tour lasted from 26 January to 6 February.

In October, long-time drummer Callum Cramp announced his departure from the band. Personal tensions between Cramp and the band were cited as the reason he left. "Hurt", the band's first single without Cramp, was released on 8 November 2017.

From 24 November to 17 December, the band embarked on their first US headlining tour with support from Free Throw, Grayscale, and Head North. Blake Caruso filled in for drums on this tour before officially joining the band.

On 29 March 2018, they joined the line-up of Australia's first Download Festival in Melbourne.

On 29 May 2018, the single "You Can Count on Me" was released alongside an accompanying music video. On 31 July, the second single, "Friday Forever" was released alongside an accompanying music video. Trophy Eyes' third studio album, The American Dream, was released on 3 August. A music video for their track "Lavender Bay", was released on 14 November.

=== Cross' departure and "Figure Eight" (2019–2022) ===
In April 2019, Trophy Eyes performed as a support act for Bring Me the Horizon during the Australian leg of their First Love Tour alongside You Me At Six and Frank Carter & The Rattlesnakes. On 16 July, the band announced that founding guitarist Kevin Cross will leave the band after they perform at Splendour in the Grass that Saturday.

On 15 January 2020 the band released the single, "Figure Eight", their first single since The American Dream. Unlike their other songs, "Figure Eight" features the addition of a saxophone, which is rumoured to be played by bassist Jeremy Winchester. Blake Caruso confirmed on Twitter that the single would not be on the upcoming album.

On 28 October 2021, Trophy Eyes released a new single, "27 Club". They then released further singles, "Bittersweet" on 1 December 2021 and "Nobody Said" on 8 February 2022.

=== Hallett's departure and Suicide and Sunshine (2023–present) ===
On 8 February 2023, long-time guitarist Andrew Hallett announced his departure from the band to focus on his family. Josh Campiao of Hellions was announced as the new lead guitarist on 12 March 2023. The band released their new single, "Blue Eyed Boy", on 15 March 2023. Their American co-headline tour with Against the Current and supported by Yours Truly began in Orlando, Florida on 22 April 2023. On 12 April 2023, the band announced their fourth album Suicide and Sunshine, which was released on 23 June 2023 and features 15 tracks, including "Blue Eyed Boy" and "What Hurts the Most".

During a 30 April 2024 show at Mohawk Place in Buffalo, New York, John Floreani leaped into the crowd, landing on top of a woman who then suffered a broken neck, partially paralysing her. The woman, Bird Piché, 24, is suing after she sustained spinal cord injuries, alleging negligence from the defendant, and their failure to prevent "unsafe and/or dangerous conditions." The suit names the venue Mohawk Place, the promoter After Dark Entertainment, LLC, Trophy Eyes, and frontman John Floreani.

== Members ==
Current

- John Floreani – lead vocals (2013–present)
- Jeremy Winchester – bass guitar, saxophone, backing vocals (2013–present)
- Blake Caruso – drums (2017–present)
- Josh Campiao – guitars (2023–present)

Former

- Callum Cramp – drums (2013–2017)
- Kevin Cross – rhythm guitar (2013–2019)
- Andrew Hallett – lead guitar (2013–2023), rhythm guitar (2019–2023)

== Discography ==
=== Albums ===
Title	Details	Peak positions	
Title	Details	AUS	US Heat
Mend, Move On	Release date: 4 November 2014; Label: Hopeless (HR2100); Formats: CD, LP, digital download, streaming	—	—
Chemical Miracle	Release date: 14 October 2016; Label: Hopeless (HR2301); Formats: CD, LP, digital download, streaming	8	14
The American Dream	Release date: 3 August 2018; Label: Hopeless (HR2494); Formats: CD, LP, digital download, streaming	8	5
Suicide and Sunshine	Release date: 23 June 2023; Label: Hopeless; Formats: CD, LP, digital download, streaming	8	—

=== Extended plays ===
Title	Details
Demo 2013	Release date: 8 April 2013; Label: Self-released; Format: Digital download
Everything Goes Away	Release date: 11 November 2013; Label: Self-released; Format: Digital download

=== Singles ===
Title	Year	Album
"Hourglass"	2014	Everything Goes Away
"Bandaid"	2014	Everything Goes Away
"In Return"	2014	Mend, Move On
"White Curtains"	2014	Mend, Move On
"Penfold State Forest"	2014	Mend, Move On
"Tired Hearts"	2015	Non-album single
"Chlorine"	2016	Chemical Miracle
"Heaven Sent"	2016	Chemical Miracle
"Breathe You In"	2016	Chemical Miracle
"Hurt"	2017	Non-album single
"You Can Count on Me"	2018	The American Dream
"More Like You"	2018	The American Dream
"Friday Forever"	2018	The American Dream
"Figure Eight"	2020	Non-album singles
"27 Club"	2021	Non-album singles
"Bittersweet"	2021	Non-album singles
"Nobody Said"	2022	Non-album singles
"Blue Eyed Boy"	2023	Suicide and Sunshine
"What Hurts the Most"	2023	Suicide and Sunshine
"Kill"	2023	Suicide and Sunshine

=== Music videos ===
Year	Song	Director
2014	"Hourglass"	Chris Elder
2014	"Bandaid"	Chris Elder
2014	"In Return"	Warwick Hughes
2014	"White Curtains"	Warwick Hughes
2016	"Chlorine"	Haus Party
2016	"Breathe You In"	Warwick Hughes
2017	"Counting Sheep"	Warwick Hughes
2018	"You Can Count On Me"	Adrian Eyre
2018	"Friday Forever"	John Floreani; Warwick Hughes
2018	"Lavender Bay"	Ryan Sauer
2020	"Figure Eight"	Eddie Deal
2021	"27 Club"	Harry Steel
2023	"Blue Eyed Boy"	Thomas Elliott
2023	"What Hurts The Most"	Thomas Elliott
2023	"Life in Slow Motion"	Boy Tillekens
2023	"OMW"	Cian Marangos
