= Glue (Boston Manor album) =

Studio album by Boston Manor
- Released: May 1, 2020
- Genre: Alternative rock
- Length: 50:55
- Label: Pure Noise
- Producer: Boston Manor; Mike Sapone

Boston Manor chronology
Welcome to the Neighbourhood (2018)	Glue (2020)	Datura (2022)

Singles from Glue
- 1. "Liquid" Released: June 3, 2019; 2. "Everything Is Ordinary" Released: February 7, 2020; 3. "On a High Ledge" Released: March 4, 2020; 4. "Ratking" Released: March 5, 2020; 5. "Plasticine Dreams" Released: April 3, 2020

Glue (stylized as GLUE) is the third full-length studio album by British rock band Boston Manor. Released on May 1, 2020 on Pure Noise Records.

== Background ==
On February 5, 2020, Boston Manor announced their third studio album, Glue, to be released on May 1. Two days later on February 7, they released the album's lead single, "Everything Is Ordinary".

== Chart performance ==
Glue debuted at number 97 on the UK Albums Chart.

== Critical reception ==
Professional ratings
Aggregate scores
Source	Rating
AnyDecentMusic?	7.7/10
Metacritic	90/100
Review scores
Source	Rating
Clash	9/10
Exclaim!	6/10
Gigwise	8/10
Kerrang!	5/5
The Line of Best Fit	8.5/10

Glue was met with critical acclaim. At Metacritic, which assigns a normalized rating out of 100 to reviews from professional publications, the album received an average score of 90, based on 5 reviews. AnyDecentMusic? gave it 7.7 out of 10, based on their assessment of the critical consensus. At Album of the Year the album received an average score of 83 out of 100.

== Track listing ==
No.	Title	Length
1.	"Everything Is Ordinary"	3:30
2.	"1's & 0's"	3:25
3.	"Plasticine Dreams"	4:05
4.	"Terrible Love"	4:05
5.	"On a High Ledge"	3:28
6.	"Only1"	3:50
7.	"You, Me & the Class War"	4:05
8.	"Playing God"	4:04
9.	"Brand New Kids"	3:42
10.	"Ratking"	3:25
11.	"Stuck in the Mud"	4:04
12.	"Liquid" (featuring John Floreani)	3:49
13.	"Monolith"	5:23
Total length:		50:55

== Personnel ==
- Henry Cox – lead vocals
- Mike Cunniff – lead guitar
- Dan Cunniff – bass, backing vocals
- Ash Wilson – rhythm guitar, backing vocals
- Jordan Pugh – drums, percussion
