= Fail You Again =

Studio album by Can't Swim
- Released: March 10, 2017
- Recorded: August 2016–January 2017
- Genre: Post-hardcore; emo
- Length: 39:45
- Label: Pure Noise

Can't Swim chronology
Death Deserves A Name (2016)	Fail You Again (2017)	This Too Won't Pass (2018)

Professional ratings
Aggregate scores
Source	Rating
Metacritic	78/100
Review scores
Source	Rating
Alternative Press	3.5/5 stars
Kerrang!	4/5 stars
New Noise	5/5 stars
Punknews.org	4/5 stars
Rock Sound	7/10

Fail You Again is the debut studio album by New Jersey rock band, Can't Swim. The album was released through Pure Noise on March 10, 2017.

== Background ==
The band released the first single of the album, titled "Stranger" on November 17, 2016. The same day the music video for the song was also released. The video features the band in various scenes in the dark in a car sitting outside a house of a couple breaking up and fighting.

The band announced the release date of the album to Alternative Press on February 8, 2017. The same day, they released the music video to the single "We Won't Sleep".

== Track listing ==
All tracks are written by Chris LoPorto, Mike Sanchez, Greg McDevitt, Danny Rico, and Andrea Morgan.

No.	Title	Length
1.	"What's Your Big Idea?"	3:13
2.	"We Won't Sleep"	2:48
3.	"$50,000,000"	3:01
4.	"Friend"	3:08
5.	"Quitting"	3:19
6.	"Hey Amy"	3:49
7.	"Stranger"	3:57
8.	"One Shot"	2:26
9.	"Kid"	3:59
10.	"Show Me"	2:44
11.	"Molly's Desk"	3:51
12.	"All the Moves We Make Are in the Dark"	3:30
Total length:		39:45

== Personnel ==
Can't Swim

- Christopher LoPorto – lead vocals, guitar, drums (track 4, 7, 8, 12)
- Greg McDevitt – bass, backup vocals
- Michael Sanchez – guitar, backup vocals
- Danny Rico – drums (track 1-3, 5, 6, 9-11 ), backup vocals, guitar

Additional personnel

- Lucy Clementoni – backup vocals (tracks 5, 6, 11)

Production

- Danny Rico – producer, engineer, mixer
- Ted Jensen - mastering
- Brendan Walter - artwork, layout
