= Be Nothing =

Be Nothing.

Studio album by Boston Manor
- Released: 30 September 2016
- Recorded: 2015–16
- Genre: Pop punk; emo; emo pop
- Length: 33:02
- Label: Pure Noise Records
- Producer: Neil Kennedy

Boston Manor chronology
Saudade (2015)	Be Nothing. (2016)	Welcome to the Neighbourhood (2018)

Singles from Be Nothing.
- 1. "Laika" Released: 26 July 2016; 2. "Lead Feet" Released: 30 August 2016; 3. "Fossa" Released: 15 September 2016

Be Nothing (stylized as BE NOTHING.) is the debut full-length studio album by British rock band Boston Manor, released on 30 September 2016, on Pure Noise Records. The album serves as a follow-up to their 2015 EP, Saudade, and was produced by Neil Kennedy.

The album was preceded by its lead single "Laika", released on 26 July 2016. The album spawned two more singles; "Lead Feet" was released on 30 August 2016 and "Fossa" was released on 15 September 2016. In support of the album, the band released music videos for the song "Lead Feet" and "Burn You Up", and embarked on a European tour with Can't Swim and toured as support on North American tours with Moose Blood, Have Mercy, and Knuckle Puck from 2016 to 2018.

== Background and recording ==
Boston Manor formed in 2013 and released their debut extended play (EP), titled Here/Now, which was released on 27 July 2013, on Never Mend Records. The following year, the band continued to write and record new material, releasing a split EP with emo band Throwing Stuff, on 14 March 2014 on Aaahh!!! Real Records and Moving North Records, and their second EP, Driftwood, on 13 October 2014. In 2015, the band announced their signing to Pure Noise Records and released their third EP, Saudade, on 20 November 2015.

The band wrote and recorded Be Nothing. throughout 2016 with producer Neil Kennedy, who has produced with bands such as Creeper and Milk Teeth, with assistant production from Kyle Black and Daly George, and was mastered by Grant Berry.

== Promotion ==
On 26 July 2016, Boston Manor announced the album and released their debut single, "Laika", along with its music video.

On 30 August 2016, the band released the album's second single, "Lead Feet".

On 15 September 2016, the band released the third single, "Fossa".

== Tour ==
On 27 July 2016, Boston Manor announced the first tour in support of the album, the UK & Europe Tour, which took place from 11 November to 1 December 2016, with support from Can't Swim and Wallflower.

The band embarked on a headlining European tour from 22 May to 29 May 2017, with hardcore punk band Casey. The group performed at the 2017 Slam Dunk Music Festival in May. They also toured on the Vans Warped Tour from June to August in the United States and Canada on the Full Sail Stage.

On 7 August 2017, it was revealed that the band were to tour as support on American indie rock band Have Mercy's headlining U.S. tour, along with Can't Swim and A Will Away, from 6 October to 12 November 2017.

On 14 December 2017, it was announced that the band were to tour as support on American pop punk band Knuckle Puck's 2018 U.S. tour, along with Hot Mulligan, Free Throw, and Jetty Bones, from 8 March to 8 April 2018.

== Reception ==
Upon the album's release, Be Nothing. received generally positive reviews from music critics. Many critics praised the album for its diversity and using different styles of rock. In a review from Sputnikmusic, the album received a 4/5, an "excellent" rating, stating it as "one of the most well-crafted and thought-out debuts".

== Track listing ==
No.	Title	Length
1.	"Burn You Up"	3:15
2.	"Lead Feet"	3:38
3.	"Laika"	3:17
4.	"Cu"	3:15
5.	"Broken Glass"	3:59
6.	"Kill Your Conscience"	4:05
7.	"Forget Me Not"	3:12
8.	"This Song Is Dedicated to Nobody"	2:53
9.	"Stop Trying, Be Nothing."	2:43
10.	"Fossa"	4:05
Total length:		33:02

== Credits and personnel ==
Boston Manor

- Henry Cox – lead vocals
- Mike Cunniff – lead guitar
- Dan Cunniff – bass, backing vocals
- Ash Wilson – rhythm guitar, backing vocals
- Jordan Pugh – drums

Additional personnel

- Neil Kennedy – production
- Daly George – additional production
- Kyle Black – additional production, mixing engineer
- Henry Lunetta – assistant engineer
- Colin Schwanke – assistant engineer
- Grant Berry – mastering engineer
- Mir Land – art design
