= Let's Start Degeneracy =

Studio album by Microwave
- Released: April 26, 2024
- Genre: Alternative rock; punk rock
- Length: 30:23
- Language: English
- Label: Pure Noise
- Producer: Nathan Hardy

Microwave chronology
Death Is a Warm Blanket (2019)	Let's Start Degeneracy (2024)

We had actually talked about just releasing singles, but I think that people in this realm of music like albums and it gives an opportunity for a PR push and narrative surrounding a larger release. We had one album left on our deal with Pure Noise, plus we had also publicly implied that we were gonna be doing a whole record, so we were just like, "let's hash it out." But if "Circling The Drain" hadn't done as well as it did – it became a crowd favorite live and it streamed really well – we may have been reconsidering whether we should just put out more singles. Instead, it was, "let this be the blueprint of a general direction."

—Vocalist Nathan Hardy on recording Let's Start Degeneracy

Let's Start Degeneracy is a 2024 studio album by American rock band Microwave. It has received positive reviews from critics.

== Reception ==
Andrew Sacher of BrooklynVegan included this among the notable releases of the week, calling it "some return-to-form moments compared to its caustic predecessor [2019 album Death Is a Warm Blanket], but overall it's unlike any Microwave album before it", containing "some trippy elements" alongside more conventional alternative rock that he compares to "Weezer meets Third Eye Blind meets Manchester Orchestra". At Kerrang!, Jake Richardson scored this album a 3 out of 5, calling it "a riotous affair" that is a "collection of mellow songs that fall somewhere between shoegazy emo and ambient indie-pop" that is "a little too self-indulgent for some". Editors at Stereogum named this Album of the Week, with critic Danielle Chelosky that "words of wisdom" in the lyrics are "evidence that this pivot into liberated, uplifting territory is sincere and earned" and that "the result is an album that doesn't waste any time; every word and every instrumental is worthwhile".

On June 4, Stereogum did a roundup of the best albums of the year so far and rated this 31, with Danielle Chelosky stating that it "is shocking, powerful, and catchy".

== Track listing ==
1. "Portals" – 3:26
2. "Ferrari" – 2:23
3. "Circling the Drain" – 3:46
4. "Bored of Being Sad" – 3:20
5. "Straw Hat" – 3:31
6. "Let's Start Degeneracy" – 3:58
7. "Omni" – 3:32
8. "Strangers" – 2:54
9. "Concertito in G Major" – 1:16
10. "Huperzine Dreams" – 3:17

Vinyl editions have a hidden track recording of "Santeria".

== Personnel ==
Microwave

- Nathan Hardy – lead vocals, guitar, recording, production
- Tyler Hill – bass guitar, backing vocals, recording
- Timothy "Tito" Pittard – drums

Additional personnel

- Brad Blackwood – audio mastering
- Jeremy Ferguson – recording
- Josh Wilbur – mixing

== See also ==
- 2024 in American music
- List of 2024 albums
