= Death Is a Warm Blanket =

Studio album by Microwave
- Released: September 13, 2019
- Studio: Gem City Studios
- Length: 29:50
- Language: English
- Label: Pure Noise
- Producer: Nathan Hardy

Microwave chronology
Keeping Up (2018)	Death Is a Warm Blanket (2019)	Let's Start Degeneracy (2024)

I would say that the theme of Death Is A Warm Blanket was the line, “it doesn’t really get better, that’s just something they say.” Everything just keeps getting worse and everything is awful and sucks and that’s life.

—Vocalist Nathan Hardy on the themes on Death Is a Warm Blanket

Death Is a Warm Blanket is a 2019 studio album by American alternative rock band Microwave, release by Pure Noise Records. It has received positive reviews from critics.

== Reception ==
Joe Smith-Engelhardt of Exclaim! rated this album a 7 out of 10, telling readers, "If you thought of Microwave as just another emocore band until now, Death Is a Warm Blanket should change your mind. The record feels like a big shift in their direction that they hopefully continue to explore on future releases." A review in The Music ended, "although I have a few minor issues with what is still a robust final product, 'Death is a Warm Blanket' serves as a steadfast pillar in the ever-growing catalog of Microwave; one that'll certainly satiate and blow the ears off of every fan come September 13th" and characterized the release as a "gut-wrenching" "droning and sludgy mesh of genres, and a colourful display of the emotions that come with a flurry of human stresses". At PunkNews, Death Is a Warm Blanket was scored 3.5 out of 5 stars by Renaldo69 who compared this sound to Manchester Orchestra and Taking Back Sunday, with this album displaying the band's versatility.

== Track listing ==
All songs written by Nathan Hardy, Travis Hill, Tyler Hill, and Timothy "Tito" Pittard, except "Hate TKO" co-written by the previous with Aaron Gossett.

1. "Leather Daddy" – 3:40
2. "Float to the Top" – 3:37
3. "DIAWB" – 2:58
4. "The Brakeman Has Resigned" – 2:33
5. "Hate TKO" – 3:52
6. "Pull" – 2:35
7. "Love's Will Tear Us Apart" – 0:57
8. "Mirrors" – 2:57
9. "Carry" – 3:27
10. "Part of It" – 3:14

== Personnel ==
Microwave

- Nathan Hardy – lead vocals, guitar, recording, production
- Travis Hill – guitar, backing vocals, recording, additional production
- Tyler Hill – bass guitar, backing vocals
- Timothy "Tito" Pittard – drums

Additional personnel

- Cory Castro – additional vocals on "Leather Daddy"
- Alan Douches – audio mastering
- Matt Goldman – drum recording, mixing, additional production
- Aaron Gossett – additional production on "Hate TKO"
- Ryan Sanders of Mdrn Dvsn – art direction, design
- Jesse Shelley – additional percussion

== See also ==
- 2019 in American music
- List of 2019 albums
