= Microwave (American band) =

American alternative rock band from Atlanta, Georgia

- Origin: Atlanta, Georgia, U.S.
- Genres: Post-hardcore, indie rock, alternative rock, emo, soft grunge
- Years active: 2012–present
- Labels: Pure Noise, SideOneDummy
- Members: Nathan Hardy; Tyler Hill; Timothy Pittard
- Past members: Wesley Swanson; Travis Hill
- Website: www.mcrwv.com

Microwave is an American rock band from Atlanta, Georgia. They have supported bands such as The Wonder Years, letlive., Have Mercy, Man Overboard, Tiny Moving Parts, Motion City Soundtrack, Jimmy Eat World, Can't Swim, The Dangerous Summer, and Boston Manor. They are currently signed to Pure Noise Records.

== History ==
=== 2012–2013: Formation and early releases ===
Microwave formed in Woodstock, Georgia, in 2012. The group released their first and second EPs, Nowhere Feels Like Home and Swine Driver, on January 10 and March 30, 2013. Their third EP When the Fever Breaks was released on September 17, 2013.

=== 2014–2018: Stovall and Much Love ===
Microwave released their first full-length album Stovall on August 23, 2014. They released their second full-length album Much Love on September 30, 2016 to critical success.

An anniversary re-release version of Much Love was published in 2023 to commemorate the band's 10th year. The release consisted of a limited-edition 300 pressings of the album, which sold out. The band stated that "Much Love was a big steppingstone in the growth of our band, and we really explored the range of what we could do sonically and lyrically."

=== 2019–2022: Death Is a Warm Blanket ===
Their third full-length-album Death Is a Warm Blanket was released September 13, 2019, via Pure Noise Records. Loudwire named it one of the 50 best rock albums of 2019.

On July 5, 2022, the band released "Someday I Suppose"/"Santeria", a split promotional single with Drug Church, which included the band’s cover of "Santeria" by Sublime. Both songs appeared on the compilation album Dead Formats, Vol. 1 from Pure Noise Records, which was released on August 29, 2022.

=== 2024–present: Let's Start Degeneracy ===
Microwave's fourth full-length-album Let's Start Degeneracy was released April 26, 2024, via Pure Noise Records.

== Musical style and influences ==
Microwave's sound is said to be a hybrid of emo, pop punk, and post-hardcore, incorporating "loud guitar rock, post-hardcore experimentation and general angsty energy into a brooding but lively sound". The band's lyrics are described as "depressive and often softly nihilistic".

Microwave have cited influences including American Football, Cap'n Jazz, Pg. 99, Saetia, Fear Before the March of Flames, the Chariot, Heavy Heavy Low Low, Nirvana, Gorillaz, Sneaker Pimps, Outkast, Kanye West, Nine Inch Nails, Converge, Portugal. The Man, Radiohead, Brand New and Queens of the Stone Age. Since 2020, they have also been taking influence from Foxing, Frank Ocean the Spirit of the Beehive, Sorry and Mac Miller.

== Discography ==
=== Studio albums ===
- Stovall (2014)
- Much Love (2016)
- Death Is a Warm Blanket (2019)
- Let's Start Degeneracy (2024)

=== EPs ===
- Nowhere Feels Like Home (2013)
- Swine Driver (2013)
- When the Fever Breaks (2013)
- Head North / Microwave (split EP with Head North) (2015)
- keeping Up (2018)
- Step Inside (split EP with Puddle Splasher) (2026)

=== Singles ===
- "Carry" (2019)
- "DIAWB" (2019)
- "Float to the Top" (2019)
- "Circling the Drain" (2022)
- "Straw Hat" (2022)
- "Ferrari" (2023)
- "Bored of Being Sad" (2024)
- "Huperzine Dreams" (2024)

=== Other appearances ===
- "Someday I Suppose/Santeria" (promotional single with Drug Church) (2022)

== Members ==
Current members

- Nathan Hardy – lead vocals, guitar (2012–present)
- Tyler Hill – bass, backing vocals (2012–present)
- Timothy "Tito" Pittard – drums (2012–present)

Touring members

- Lucas Daniel Jones - guitar, backing vocals (2022–present)

Past Members

- Wesley Swanson – guitar, backing vocals (2012–2016)
- Travis Hill – guitar, backing vocals (2016–2021)
