= Boston Manor (band) =

British rock band

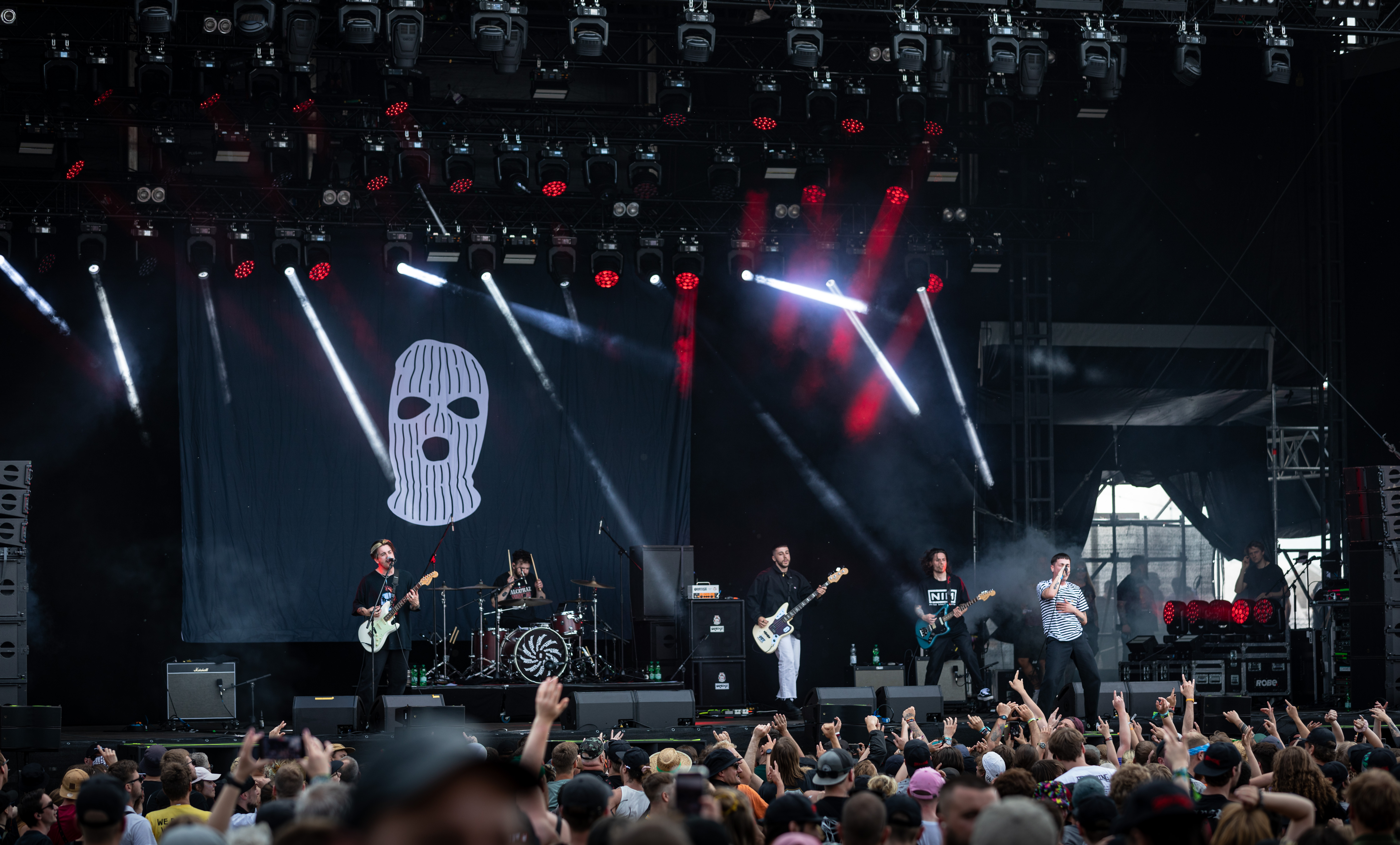
- Boston Manor live @Rock am Ring 2022

Background information
- Origin: Blackpool, Lancashire, England
- Genres: Alternative rock; emo pop; pop punk (early)
- Years active: 2013–present
- Labels: SharpTone; Pure Noise
- Members: Henry Cox; Mike Cunniff; Ash Wilson; Dan Cunniff; Jordan Pugh
- Website: bostonmanorband.com

Boston Manor are a British rock band formed in Blackpool, Lancashire, England, in March 2013. They released a first EP, Here/Now, through Never Mend Records on Bandcamp, and in 2014 they signed with Failure By Design Records for their second EP, Driftwood. In 2015 the band signed with Pure Noise Records: with them, they released another EP, Saudade, as well as their full-length albums Be Nothing (2016), Welcome to the Neighbourhood (2018) and Glue (2020). The band's sound blends emo with heavier influences, reminiscent of '90s grunge and early 2000s post-hardcore. The band have been nominated for Best British Breakthrough at Kerrang! Awards in 2018 and Welcome to the Neighbourhood received a nomination for Best Album Artwork at Heavy Music Awards in 2019.

== History ==
Boston Manor started in Blackpool, Lancashire, England, in March 2013, after splitting up with their previous bands. "There isn't much of a music scene in Blackpool," vocalist Henry Cox affirmed. "We had a little stab at reinvigorating it. When we were 16, 17, 18, we were playing shows when we were with different bands. But there would be a gig at a venue and you could only do the one." Talking about their beginnings, he added: "We had to buy a van and play outside Blackpool as it was the only way to get our music out there." The band's name comes from the title of a demo that one of Henry's friends sent him.

On 27 July 2013, the band released the EP Here/Now through Never Mend Records, an independent label based in Virginia, on Bandcamp.

On 31 March 2014, Boston Manor released a split EP with the band Throwing Stuff, through Aaahh!!! Real Records.

In 2014 they signed with Failure By Design Records, and on 13 October of the same year they released the EP Driftwood. In January 2015, they joined Moose Blood for a tour across the UK.

In 2015, Boston Manor signed with Pure Noise Records and released a third EP, titled Saudade, on 20 November. During spring 2016, the band was supposed to join Hit The Lights, Seaway, Can't Swim and Casey Bolles for a tour in the US, which they had to drop off of due to visa issues.

On 30 September 2016, they revealed their first studio album, Be Nothing, and in November 2016 they started their first headlining tour in UK and Europe, with supporting acts Can't Swim and Wallflower.

In summer 2017, the band took part to Vans Warped Tour in the US along with Alestorm, The Ataris and many other punk bands.

On 7 September 2018, Boston Manor released their second album, Welcome to the Neighbourhood. Critics praised the record: "Boston Manor are one of the few bands to easily surpass the quality of their debut with their sophomore release by taking everything that made them good in the first place, amping it up 10-fold, and throwing in some new tricks for good measure", and Kerrang! featured it as Album Of The Week.

At the beginning of 2019, the band embarked on a European tour supporting Good Charlotte, before joining A Day To Remember for a spring leg in the US.

On 3 June 2019, Boston Manor released a new track, "Liquid", featuring Trophy Eyes frontman John Floreani. The single included an acoustic version of "Halo", hit single from Welcome to the Neighbourhood.

In summer 2019, the band performed live at Reading and Leeds Festivals for the first time, before starting a tour across Europe in October and their first headlining tour in the US and Canada in November/December with support from Microwave, Heart Attack Man and Selfish Things.

On 19 August 2019, Boston Manor reimagined the single "England's Dreaming" in an acoustic version: the release was accompanied by a remix of "Welcome to the Neighbourhood" by Lebrock as b-side.

On 1 May 2020, Boston Manor released their third studio album, Glue. In April 2020, Kerrang described the band as "the voice of a new generation".

In July 2021, Boston Manor announced their signing with SharpTone Records as well as a European tour with Welsh pop punk band Neck Deep.

On October 29, 2021, the band released the EP Desperate Times Desperate Pleasures.

In 2022, the band released Datura, the first album in a two-part series. In order to write the album’s successor, they refrained from performing live, though making some festival appearances and playing a small run in shows in the US. “Sundiver”, the second part to “Datura”, was released on September 6, 2024.

== Members ==
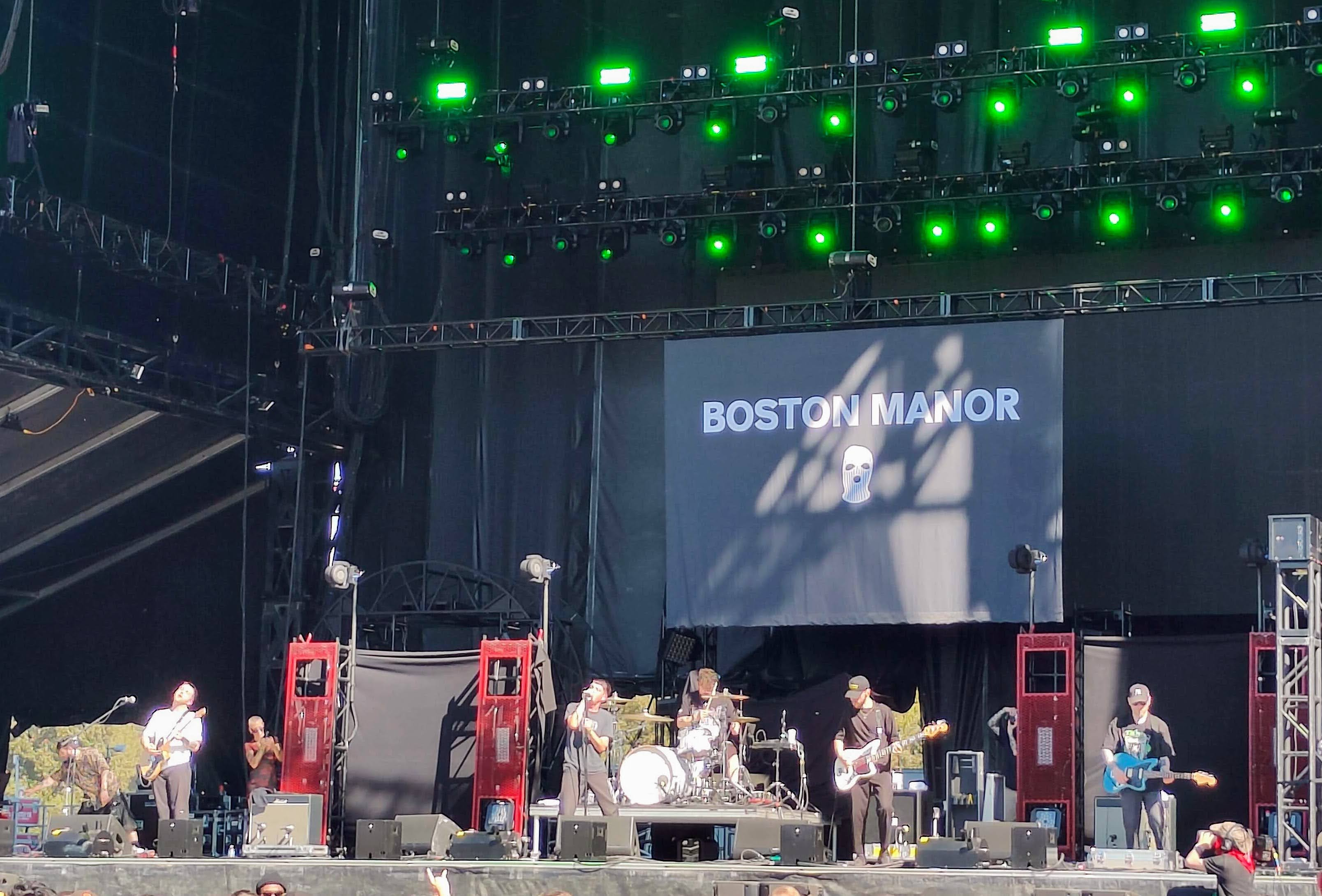
Boston Manor playing at Aftershock 2023.

- Henry Cox – lead vocals
- Mike Cunniff – lead guitar
- Ash Wilson – rhythm guitar, backing vocals
- Dan Cunniff – bass
- Jordan Pugh – drums

The lineup has remained unchanged since their formation in 2013.

== Discography ==
=== Studio albums ===
- Be Nothing. (2016)
- Welcome to the Neighbourhood (2018)
- Glue (2020)
- Datura (2022)
- Sundiver (2024)

== Awards ==
Nominated work	Year	Award	Result
Boston Manor	2018	Kerrang! Awards Best British Breakthrough	Nominated
Welcome to the Neighbourhood	2019	Heavy Music Awards Best Album Artwork	Nominated
