= Blackhole (band) =

UK musical group

- Origin: Hemel Hempstead, England
- Genres: Hardcore punk
- Years active: 2006–2010, 2015–2017 (hiatus)
- Labels: Search and Destroy Records
- Members: Richard Carter; Andreas Yiasoumi; Nick Mitchell; Max Hart; Jack Kenny
- Past members: Alex Hunt
- Website: www.myspace.com/blackhole

Blackhole are an English hardcore punk band from Hemel Hempstead and Berkhamsted, England. The band was formed in 2007 by singer Richard Carter and guitarist Andreas Yiasoumi when their previous bands fell apart. They have toured across the UK with Cancer Bats, Every Time I Die, The Ghost of a Thousand and Johnny Truant, along with others. They released album Dead Hearts in 2009 on UK record label Search and Destroy.

== History ==
After forming in 2007, the band recorded a 4 track independent EP, "Harness". In 2009 Blackhole released their debut studio album. After being picked up by the Search and Destroy record label, the band worked on recording new material. Dead Hearts was released on 7 September 2009, and received positive critical reception from the BBC, The Skinny, and Allmusic. The band were chosen to play at the Sonisphere Festival in 2009 (only in the UK) on the Jägermeister stage, as well as headlining the Red Bull stage at that year's Download festival. Blackhole opening on a UK tour for melodic metalcore band Underoath, along with the British post-hardcore band We Are the Ocean during March 2010. Blackhole played at Slam Dunk Festival 2010 on the Imperial Clothing stage with Your Demise, Devil Sold His Soul and Azriel.

The band members are Max Hart on bass, Alex Hunt on drums, Nick Mitchell and Andreas Yiasoumi on guitar and Richard Carter on lead vocals. Richard Carter is the brother of Frank and Steph Carter from British hardcore punk band Gallows.

It was announced on the band's social media page that they had parted ways in 2010. In 2015 the band announced they would be reuniting to support Frank Carter & The Rattlesnakes on tour. In November, they released a two-track EP, which included the songs 'Ghosts' and 'Lustrum' and then announced they were working on a second full-length in 2016.

== Members ==
Current

- Richard Carter – lead vocals
- Andreas Yiasoumi – guitar
- Nick Mitchell – guitar
- Max Hart – bass
- Jack Kenny – drums

Former

- Alex Hunt — drums

== Discography ==
=== Studio albums ===
- Dead Hearts (2009)

=== EPs ===
- "Harness" (2007)
- "Blackhole EP" (2015)

=== Singles ===
Year	Song title	Album
2007	"Not That This is a Bad Thing"	Single
2009	"Scared to Change"	Dead Hearts
