= End of Suffering =

Studio album by Frank Carter and the Rattlesnakes
- Released: 3 May 2019
- Studio: The Chapel (South Thoresby); Voltaire Road (London)
- Genre: Alternative rock; punk rock; indie rock
- Length: 46:00
- Label: International Death Cult
- Producer: Cam Blackwood

Frank Carter and the Rattlesnakes chronology
Modern Ruin (2017)	End of Suffering (2019)	Sticky (2021)

Singles from End of Suffering
- 1. "Crowbar" Released: 15 January 2019; 2. "Anxiety" Released: 29 March 2019; 3. "Kitty Sucker" Released: 30 April 2019

End of Suffering is the third studio album by British punk rock band Frank Carter and the Rattlesnakes. It was released on 3 May 2019 through International Death Cult, and received mostly favourable reviews from critics. At 46 minutes, it is the band's longest album to date.

== Critical reception ==
Professional ratings
Aggregate scores
Source	Rating
Metacritic	76/100
Review scores
Source	Rating
Clash	7/10
DIY	4/5 stars
Exclaim!	7/10
MusicOMH	4/5 stars
NME	4/5 stars

According to the review aggregator Metacritic, End of Suffering received "generally favorable reviews" based on a weighted average score of 76 out of 100 from 10 critic scores. Loudwire named it one of the 50 best rock albums of 2019.

== Commercial performance ==
The album peaked at number 4 on the UK Albums Chart and topped the UK Rock & Metal Albums Chart, spending seven weeks in the top 10 of the latter chart. End of Suffering did not enter the ARIA Albums Chart, but peaked at number 36 on the ARIA Digital Album Chart.

== Track listing ==
No.	Title	Length
1.	"Why a Butterfly Can't Love a Spider"	3:40
2.	"Tyrant Lizard King" (featuring Tom Morello)	2:40
3.	"Heartbreaker"	3:19
4.	"Crowbar"	3:20
5.	"Love Games"	3:34
6.	"Anxiety"	3:38
7.	"Angel Wings"	4:13
8.	"Supervillain"	4:02
9.	"Latex Dreams"	3:41
10.	"Kitty Sucker"	3:44
11.	"Little Devil"	3:14
12.	"End of Suffering"	5:01
13.	"Bleed"	3:44
Total length:		46:00

== Personnel ==
Frank Carter & the Rattlesnakes

- Frank Carter – vocals, art direction
- Dean Richardson – guitars, art direction
- Tom 'Tank' Barclay – bass
- Gareth Grover – drums

Additional personnel

- Tom Morello – guitar (track 2)
- Cam Blackwood – producer, engineer, programming
- Tom Visser – assistant producer, engineering, programming
- Dan Moyler – engineer
- Caesar Edmunds – engineer
- Alex Copp – assistant engineer
- Alan Moulder – mixing
- Tom Herbert – mixing assistant
- John Davis – mastering
- Studio Yuck – artwork and design
- Daniel Alexander Harris – photography

== Charts ==
Chart performance for End of Suffering
Chart (2019)	Peak position
Belgian Albums (Ultratop Flanders)	177
Belgian Albums (Ultratop Wallonia)	173
German Albums (Offizielle Top 100)	75
Scottish Albums (OCC)	6
UK Albums (OCC)	4
UK Independent Albums (OCC)	1
UK Rock & Metal Albums (OCC)	1
