= The American Dream (Trophy Eyes album) =

2018 album by Trophy Eyes

Studio album by Trophy Eyes
- Released: 3 August 2018
- Studio: Karma Sound Studios, Thailand
- Genre: Pop punk; punk rock; melodic hardcore; emo
- Length: 39:38
- Label: Hopeless
- Producer: Shane Edwards

Trophy Eyes chronology
| Chemical Miracle (2016) | The American Dream (2018) | Suicide and Sunshine (2023) |

Singles from I'm Dreaming
- 1. "You Can Count on Me" Released: 29 May 2018; 2. "More Like You" Released: 25 June 2018; 3. "Friday Forever" Released: 30 July 2018

The American Dream is the third studio album by Australian rock band Trophy Eyes, released on 3 August 2018 by Hopeless Records. It was produced by Shane Edwards at Karma Sound Studios in Thailand. It was the first album to feature new drummer Blake Caruso, and the final album to feature rhythm guitarist Kevin Cross.

== Background and promotion ==
Trophy Eyes released their first single "You Can Count on Me" on 29 May 2018, along with an accompanying music video. Their second single "More Like You" was released on 25 June. The band released their third single "Friday Forever" on 30 July along with an accompanying music video. A music video for "Lavender Bay" was released on 13 November.

In October, Trophy Eyes went on a national tour to promote the new album performing in all East Coast major cities. It was their biggest national tour to date. Joining Trophy Eyes as supporting acts were Dear Seattle, Maddy Jane, and Stumps. All tour dates were for fans aged 18+.

== Writing and composition ==
Describing the single "You Can Count on Me", frontman John Floreani said: "'You Can Count On Me' looks outward at the treatment of musicians and artists on social media platforms, and services as a voice for those who choose not to defend themselves." Their second single "More Like You" chronicles the self loathing of Floreani himself. The track "Lavender Bay" is a tribute to the Sydney suburb of the same name, the band's hometown, describing it, Floreani says: "Sydney is my home, and I wanted it to know who I was. This song is living proof that dreams do come true, and we caught it all on camera." It is an ode to anyone wanting to make it big.

== Critical reception ==
Professional ratings
Review scores
| Source | Rating |
|---|---|
| Hysteria | 10/10 |
| The Music | 4/5 stars |
| New Noise | 4.5/5 stars |
| Newcastle Herald | 3/5 stars |
| NME | 5/5 stars |
| PunkNews | 4.5/5 stars |
| Wall of Sound | 8/10 |

The album received largely positive reviews. The American Dream peaked at number 8 on the ARIA charts. Wall of Sound, in a positive review said: "While transitioning to a more pop sound, they’ve not completely abandoned their roots, which is something a lot of bands can learn from." In a 10/10 review from Hysteria, Matt Doria praised the album calling it: "Another jaw-dropping work of art from one of the most exciting bands Australia has to offer." The Music in a positive review said: "The American Dream's anthemic choruses feature in almost every song, a necessary energy to break through the intensity of the lyrical content."

Josh Leeson writing for the Newcastle Herald rated the album 3-stars saying: "On their third album, The American Dream, Trophy Eyes have unashamedly set the course for mainstream success." James McMahon from NME gave the album a 10/10, saying: "Strangely for a record made by a collection of Australians, ‘The American Dream’ is a record that serves as a timely reminder of America's place at the nucleus of pop culture. And, that for all its current strife, its DNA remains the core building block within the obelisk of rock ‘n’ roll." New Noise, in a positive review said: "even if the band’s sound confuses you a little at first, give it some due time; Trophy Eyes have come across something very special here, and The American Dream is one to hold onto." A positive review from PunkNews called the album "a bombastic, aggressive collection of songs [that] could have turned messy with a view missteps. Its many cheer-leading choruses feels refreshing rather than overdone."

In a positive review from Music Feeds, Brenton Harris said: "Trophy Eyes are no longer a pop-punk act, if they ever even were. They are something bigger, braver and rarer than that. They are Trophy Eyes and they are living The American Dream." Kerrang! named the album their 'Album of the Week', and said: "The American Dream shows that Trophy Eyes have the ambition and flair to turn their grand visions into reality." In a positive review from Amnplify, reviewer Katelyn Murray said: "The American Dream is some of Trophy Eyes best work, they have really put their all into this album and grown musically to showcase a side of them that hasn’t been seen before."

== Track listing ==
All tracks are written by Trophy Eyes and Shane Edwards.

| No. | Title | Length |
|---|---|---|
| 1. | "Autumn" | 3:18 |
| 2. | "Something Bigger Than This" | 3:23 |
| 3. | "Friday Forever" | 3:12 |
| 4. | "More Like You" | 3:29 |
| 5. | "A Cotton Candy Sky" | 1:56 |
| 6. | "You Can Count on Me" | 3:12 |
| 7. | "Broken" | 3:17 |
| 8. | "Tip Toe" | 3:15 |
| 9. | "Lavender Bay" | 3:00 |
| 10. | "Miming in The Choir" | 3:48 |
| 11. | "A Symphony of Crickets" | 1:45 |
| 12. | "I Can Feel it Calling" | 6:03 |
| Total length: | | 39:38 |

== Personnel ==
Adapted from Discogs.

Trophy Eyes

- John Floreani – lead vocals
- Jeremy Winchester – bass guitar, backing vocals
- Andrew Hallett – lead guitar
- Kevin Cross – rhythm guitar
- Blake Caruso – drums

Production

- Shane Edwards – producer, mixing, engineer, strings (arranging and producing)
- Chris Craker – strings (arranging and producing)
- Pat Fox – album artwork, photography
- Vincent Lee – album artwork

== Charts ==
| Chart (2018) | Peak position |
|---|---|
| Australian Albums (ARIA) | 8 |
| US Heatseekers Albums (Billboard) | 5 |
