= Modern Ruin (Frank Carter and the Rattlesnakes album) =

Studio album by Frank Carter and the Rattlesnakes
- Released: 20 January 2017
- Studio: Broadfields (Watford)
- Genre: Alternative rock; hardcore punk; punk rock; indie rock
- Length: 38:33
- Label: International Death Cult
- Producer: Frank Carter; Thomas Mitchener; Dean Richardson

Frank Carter and the Rattlesnakes chronology
Blossom (2015)	Modern Ruin (2017)	End of Suffering (2019)

Singles from Modern Ruin
- 1. "Snake Eyes" Released: 1 June 2016; 2. "Lullaby" Released: 27 September 2016; 3. "Wild Flowers" Released: 1 December 2016

Modern Ruin is the second studio album by English punk rock band Frank Carter and the Rattlesnakes. It was released in January 2017 through International Death Cult. To celebrate the album's release, a pop-up shop was opened at Sang Bleu tattoo in London.

Professional ratings
Aggregate scores
Source	Rating
Metacritic	74/100
Review scores
Source	Rating
Alternative Press	4/5 stars
NME	4/5 stars
Q	74/100

== Track listing ==
All tracks are written by Frank Carter and Dean Richardson.

No.	Title	Length
1.	"Bluebelle"	1:00
2.	"Lullaby"	3:14
3.	"Snake Eyes"	4:17
4.	"Vampires"	3:20
5.	"Wild Flowers"	3:04
6.	"Acid Veins"	3:56
7.	"God Is My Friend"	3:07
8.	"Jackals"	0:55
9.	"Thunder"	3:39
10.	"Real Life"	3:30
11.	"Modern Ruin"	3:20
12.	"Neon Rust"	5:11
Total length:		38:33

== Personnel ==
Frank Carter and the Rattlesnakes

- Frank Carter – vocals, guitar (track 1), production, art direction
- Dean Richardson – guitar, production, art direction
- Thomas Mitchener – bass, production, engineering
- Gareth Grover – drums

Additional personnel

- Catherine Marks – mixing
- John Davies – mastering

== Charts ==
Chart (2017)	Peak position
Belgian Albums (Ultratop Flanders)	108
Scottish Albums (OCC)	10
UK Albums (OCC)	7
UK Independent Albums (OCC)	1
