= Blossom (Frank Carter & the Rattlesnakes album) =

Studio album by Frank Carter & the Rattlesnakes
- Released: 14 September 2015
- Studios: Broadfield Studio, Watford
- Genres: Hardcore punk, punk rock
- Length: 34:19
- Label: International Death Cult (Kobalt)
- Producers: Thomas Mitchener; Frank Carter; Dean Richardson; Memby Jago

Frank Carter & the Rattlesnakes chronology
Rotten (2015)	Blossom (2015)	Modern Ruin (2017)

Professional ratings
Aggregate scores
Source	Rating
Metacritic	84/100
Review scores
Source	Rating
Kerrang!	5/5 stars
NME	4.5/5 stars

Blossom is the first album by the punk band Frank Carter & the Rattlesnakes. It was released in 2015 through Kobalt Label Services.

== Track listing ==
Blossom – Standard edition
No.	Title	Length
1.	"Juggernaut"	3:36
2.	"Trouble"	2:38
3.	"Fangs"	2:35
4.	"Devil Inside Me"	2:58
5.	"Paradise"	3:47
6.	"Loss"	3:48
7.	"Beautiful Death"	4:00
8.	"Rotten Blossom"	2:36
9.	"Primary Explosive"	3:33
10.	"I Hate You"	4:48
Total length:		34:19

Blossom – Deluxe edition bonus tracks
No.	Title	Length
11.	"Battlefield"	1:51
12.	"Fire"	2:39
13.	"Summer of Blood"	2:28
Total length:		41:17

Blossom Live – Deluxe edition, disc 2
No.	Title	Length
1.	"Juggernaut" (Live at The Star and Garter, Manchester, 2015)	3:59
2.	"Trouble" (Live at The Fighting Cocks, London, 2015)	2:36
3.	"Fangs" (Live at The Rainbow, Birmingham, 2015)	2:32
4.	"Devil Inside Me" (Live at The Key Club, Leeds, 2015)	3:24
5.	"Paradise" (Live at The Joiners, Southampton, 2015)	3:45
6.	"Loss" (Live at The Fleece, Bristol, 2015)	3:50
7.	"Beautiful Death" (Live at Bodega, Nottingham, 2015)	3:43
8.	"Rotten Blossom" (Live at The Fleece, Bristol, 2015)	2:43
9.	"Primary Explosive" (Live at The Star and Garter, Manchester, 2015)	3:39
10.	"I Hate You" (Live at The Rainbow, Birmingham, 2015)	7:23
11.	"Battlefield" (Live at The Fighting Cocks, London, 2015)	2:09
12.	"Loss (Alternative Version)" (Live at The Brickyard, Carlisle, 2015)	3:06
Total length:		42:49

== Personnel ==
Frank Carter & the Rattlesnakes

- Frank Carter – vocals, production
- Dean Richardson – guitar, production
- Thomas Mitchener – bass, production, engineering, mixing
- Memby Jago – drums, production

Additional personnel

- Acle Kahney – mastering

== Charts ==
Chart performance for Blossom
Chart (2015)	Peak position
Australian Albums (ARIA)	81
Scottish Albums (Official Charts)	30
UK Albums (Official Charts)	18
