= Chemical Miracle =

Studio album by Trophy Eyes
- Released: 14 October 2016
- Studio: Karma Sound Studios, Thailand
- Genre: Melodic hardcore, emo, post-hardcore
- Length: 37:01
- Label: Hopeless
- Producer: Shane Edwards

Trophy Eyes chronology
Mend, Move On (2014)	Chemical Miracle (2016)	The American Dream (2018)

Singles from Chemical Miracle
- 1. "Chlorine" Released: 2 August 2016; 2. "Breathe You In" Released: 29 September 2016

Chemical Miracle is the second studio album by Australian punk rock band Trophy Eyes. The album was released on 14 October 2016 through Hopeless. It was produced by Shane Edwards at Karma Sound Studios in Thailand. The name comes from John Floreani's perception of life - everything is made of a chemical, and life itself is a miracle.

== Background and promotion ==
On 2 August 2016, a music video for "Chlorine" was released. 25 August the second song "Heaven Sent" was streamed through Hopeless. On 29 September 2016, a music video for "Breathe You In" was released. On 8 December 2016, Hopeless records published 'The Road to Chemical Miracle (Documentary)'.

The band later performed an Australian headline tour in support of the album.

== Critical reception ==
Professional ratings
Aggregate scores
Source	Rating
Metacritic	87/100
Review scores
Source	Rating
Sputnikmusic	4.3/5 stars
Punknews.org	4.5/5 stars
Rock Sound	4/5 stars
Kerrang!	4/5 stars

Chemical Miracle received rave reviews upon its release. According to Metacritic, it currently holds an aggregated score of 87/100 based on 4 reviews, indicating "universal acclaim". Sputnikmusic writer Atari gave it a 4.3 out of 5 ("superb"), summarizing his review with "From continuous instrumental surprises to brutally honest lyrics, Trophy Eyes' sophomore effort is much more than a solid return, it's an unanticipated punch to the gut - one that will leave the listener reeling as it rightfully earns its spot among the genre's most passionate and achingly honest albums."

Punknews.org gave it 4 and a half out of 5 stars, stating "It's a brutally diverse album that has something for so many rock fans. It doesn't drag across...but instead races--pummeling--through a few genres that delivers something beyond wildest expectations."

== Track listing ==
All lyrics and music by Trophy Eyes.

No.	Title	Length
1.	"Chlorine"	3:40
2.	"Counting Sheep"	3:30
3.	"Nose Bleed"	2:33
4.	"Heaven Sent"	3:36
5.	"Rain on Me"	3:56
6.	"Chemical"	1:18
7.	"Breathe You In"	3:21
8.	"Home Is"	4:12
9.	"Miracle"	1:45
10.	"Suicide Pact"	4:00
11.	"Daydreamer"	5:09
Total length:		37:01

== Personnel ==
Trophy Eyes

- John Floreani – lead vocals
- Kevin Cross – rhythm guitar
- Andrew Hallett – lead guitar
- Jeremy Winchester – bass guitar, backing vocals
- Callum Cramp – drums, percussion

Production

- Shane Edwards –

== Charts ==
Chart (2016)	Peak position
Australian Albums (ARIA)	8
