= Welcome to the Neighbourhood (Boston Manor album) =

Studio album by Boston Manor
- Released: 7 September 2018
- Recorded: 2018
- Genres: Alternative rock; grunge; emo
- Length: 40:30
- Label: Pure Noise
- Producers: Mike Sapone; Boston Manor

Boston Manor chronology
Be Nothing. (2016)	Welcome to the Neighbourhood (2018)	Glue (2020)

Singles from Welcome to the Neighbourhood
- 1. "Halo" Released: 11 June 2018; 2. "Bad Machine" Released: 13 August 2018; 3. "England's Dreaming" Released: 4 September 2018

Welcome to the Neighbourhood is the second full-length studio album by British rock band Boston Manor. Released on 7 September 2018, on Pure Noise Records, it follows the band's 2016 debut album, Be Nothing. The album was produced by Mike Sapone at The Barber Shop Studios and recorded between tours in North America and Europe in 2018. Upon its release, it charted at number 80 on the Official UK Albums chart.

The album's lead single, "Halo", was released on 11 June 2018. The second single, "Bad Machine", was released on 13 August. The third and final single, "England's Dreaming", was released on 4 September. In support of the album, the band toured internationally with bands such as Real Friends, Grayscale, Movements, and Trash Boat throughout 2018 and 2019.

== Background ==
Boston Manor released their debut studio album, Be Nothing., on 30 September 2016, on Pure Noise Records. After extensive touring to support the album, the band began writing new material for a second album during tours in the United States, the United Kingdom, and Europe. The band toured as support on Knuckle Puck's headlining tour from 8 March to 8 April 2018.

On 8 June 2018, the band performed a new song, "Halo," for the first time at Download Festival in the United Kingdom.

== Chart performance ==
Welcome to the Neighbourhood debuted at number 80 on the UK Albums Chart.

== Track listing ==
No.	Title	Length
1.	"Welcome to the Neighbourhood"	2:52
2.	"Flowers in Your Dustbin"	3:17
3.	"Halo"	3:44
4.	"England's Dreaming"	3:37
5.	"Funeral Party"	3:19
6.	"Digital Ghost"	3:41
7.	"Tunnel Vision"	3:44
8.	"Bad Machine"	3:09
9.	"If I Can't Have It No One Can"	3:14
10.	"Hate You"	3:46
11.	"FY1"	1:08
12.	"Stick Up"	3:53
13.	"The Day That I Ruined Your Life"	3:46
Total length:		40:30

== Personnel ==
Boston Manor

- Henry Cox – lead vocals
- Mike Cunniff – lead guitar
- Dan Cunniff – bass, backing vocals
- Ash Wilson – rhythm guitar, backing vocals
- Jordan Pugh – drums

Additional personnel

- Mike Sapone – production, composition
- Brett Romnes – engineer
- Eric Vande Vaarst – assistant engineer
- Kevin Kumetz – assistant engineer
- Nick Gallo – assistant engineer
- Vince Ratti – mixing engineer
- Joe LaPorta – mastering engineer
- Joshua Halling – photography
