= John Floreani =

Australian singer and musician

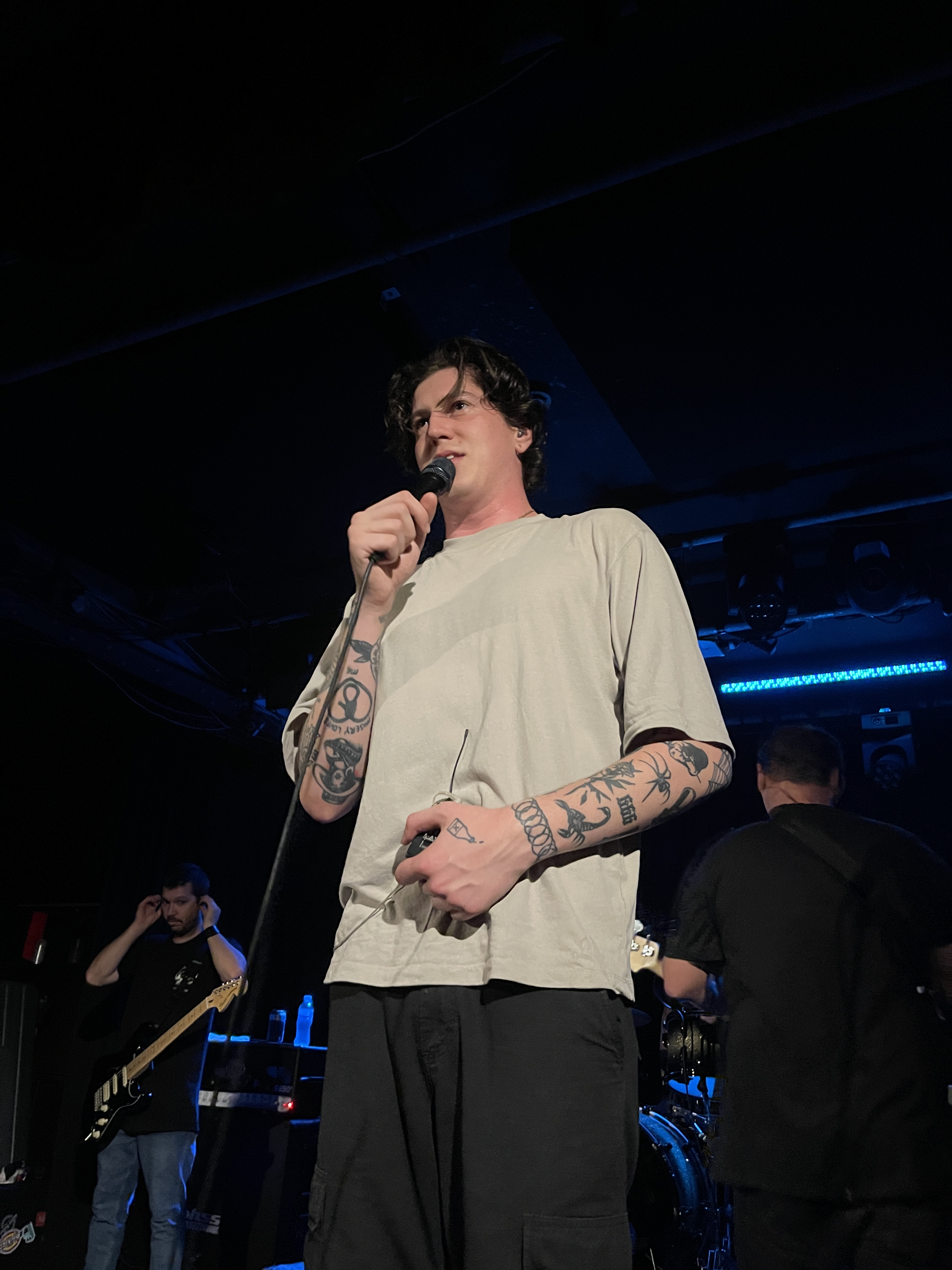
- Floreani with Trophy Eyes at Oxford Art Factory on 24 April, 2022
- Born: 27 December 1991 (age 33); Mudgee, New South Wales, Australia
- Occupation: Musician
- Years active: 2013–present
- Height: 6 ft 6 in (198 cm)
- Partner: Bianca DeLeon

John Floreani (born 27 December 1991) is an Australian singer and musician, best known as the vocalist of punk rock band, Trophy Eyes. He also releases music under his own name (formerly Little Brother). He is signed by Hopeless Records.

== Career ==
=== Solo career ===
After writing songs that were not the right fit for Trophy Eyes, Floreani created the acoustic music project, Little Brother. He released his first album Terrace in November 2014, made up of five tracks. He later released a single title "Cleveland, Oh" in 2016, and a full-length album titled sin in 2019. Floreani released his first song in three years, "Good Boy", on June 8, 2022. According to Floreani, "Good Boy" is about 'putting down a dog I loved'.

== Discography ==
=== Trophy Eyes discography ===
- Everything Goes Away (2013)
- Mend, Move On (2014)
- Chemical Miracle (2016)
- The American Dream (2018)
- Suicide and Sunshine (2023)

=== Solo discography ===
- Terrace (2014)
- sin (2019)

==== Singles featured on ====
Year	Song	Album	Artist
2014	Downsides Of Being Honest	Non-album single	Columbus
2017	For Those Who Care	Stay For Those Who Care	Perspectives
2019	Liquid	Liquid	Boston Manor
2019	Voldemort	Better Weather	With Confidence
2020	Sydney	Fantasia Famish	Agnes Manners
