= Frank Carter and the Rattlesnakes =

English punk rock band

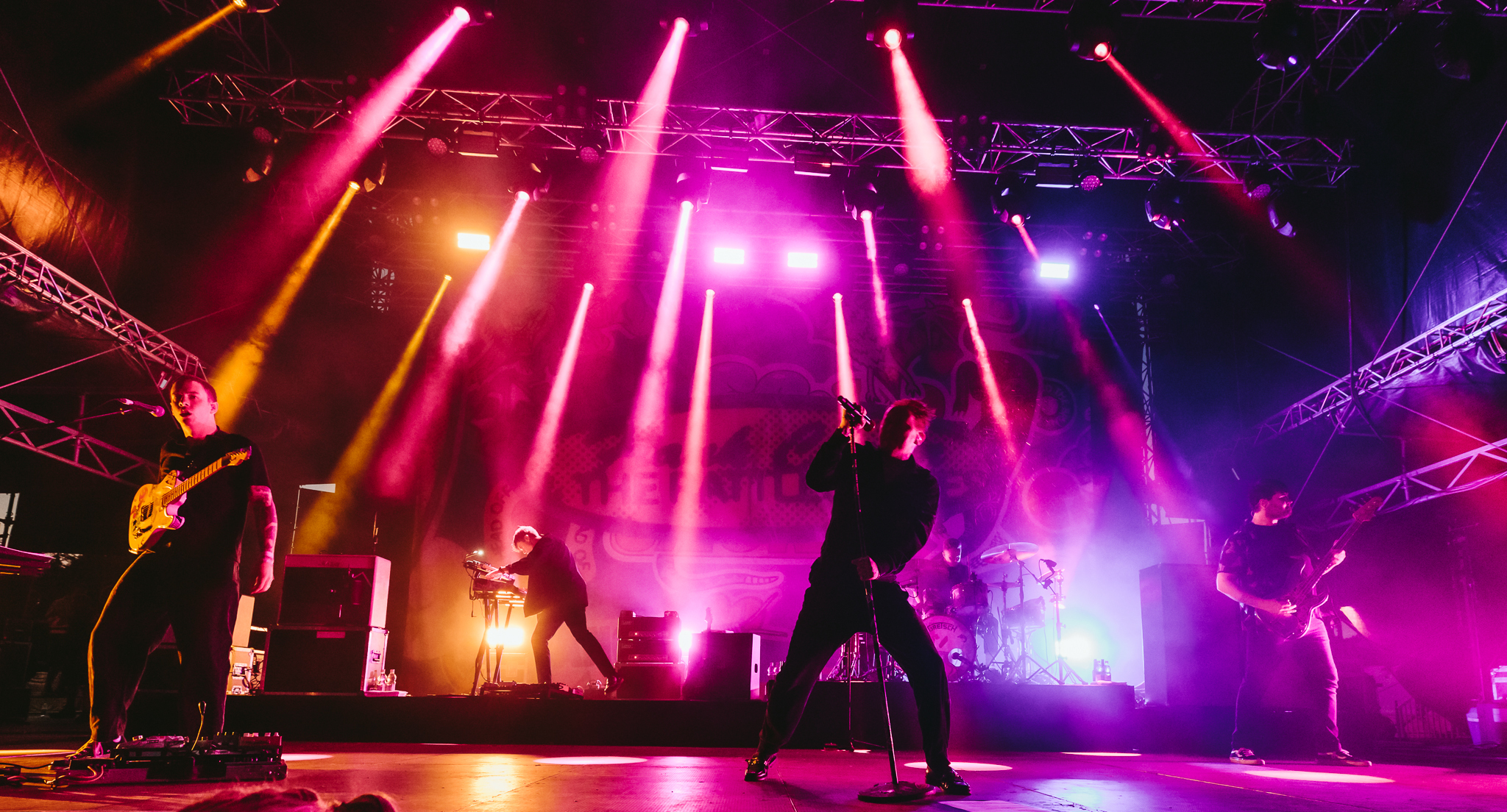
- Frank Carter and the Rattlesnakes performing in 2022

Background information
- Origin: Hemel Hempstead, Hertfordshire, England
- Genres: Punk rock; alternative rock; indie rock; hardcore punk
- Years active: 2015–2024 (hiatus)
- Label: International Death Cult (Kobalt)
- Spinoff of: Gallows, Pure Love, Heights
- Members: Frank Carter; Dean Richardson
- Past members: Memby Jago; Thomas Mitchener
- Website: andtherattlesnakes.com

Frank Carter and the Rattlesnakes were an English punk rock band formed in 2015 by frontman Frank Carter with guitarist Dean Richardson. Famed for their raucous live shows, the band released their debut album Blossom in 2015, and the follow-ups Modern Ruin in 2017 and End of Suffering in 2019. Their fourth album, Sticky, was released in October 2021. A fifth, Dark Rainbow, was released in January 2024.

== History ==
=== Formation, Rotten EP, and Blossom (2015) ===
After leaving the band Gallows in 2011 due to artistic differences, Carter started Pure Love, a project with guitarist Jim Carroll, ending that band in 2015 to form Frank Carter & the Rattlesnakes with guitarist Dean Richardson, formerly of Heights. Carter and Richardson had met a few years earlier, when Carter asked Richardson, who was also a designer and coder, to make him a website. With The Rattlesnakes, Carter returned to his hardcore roots, while retaining some of the power-pop sensibilities of Pure Love.

On 4 May 2015, Frank Carter & The Rattlesnakes released the three-track EP Rotten. The three songs would also appear on the band's debut full-length album, Blossom, released on International Death Cult on 14 August 2015. It peaked at #18 on the UK Albums Chart. Carter has described Blossom as being "about sadness and not knowing what to do with it."

=== Modern Ruin and live album (2016–2018) ===
The band finished recording Modern Ruin in January 2016, just a few months after the launch their first album. Modern Ruin was released on International Death Cult on 20 January 2017. It peaked at number 7 on the UK Albums Chart, and number 23 on the Billboard Heatseekers Albums chart. The album has a moodier feel than Blossom. It was recorded by Thomas Mitchener, formerly the band's touring bassist, in his Broadfields studio in Watford, England, which is also where Blossom was recorded.

In November 2017 the band announced a live album. 23 Live At Brixton Academy was released on 9 March 2018, having been recorded at their 8 December 2017 headline show at the O2 Academy Brixton in London, where they played every song from their first two albums plus their new single "Spray Paint Love".

=== End of Suffering and Blossom reissue (2019–2020) ===
The band released their third album, End of Suffering, on International Death Cult on 3 May 2019. The album peaked at #4 on the UK Albums Chart. NME wrote that the album "resembles a firework display on this dazzling record" where Carter "continues to mine increasingly sensitive territory, with impressive results." Some of the tracks address Carter's mental-health battle. Three singles were released off the album: "Crowbar", "Anxiety", and "Kitty Sucker". Rage Against the Machine and Audioslave guitarist Tom Morello guests on the song "Tyrant Lizard King". The collaboration came about after Carter ran into Morello in Spain at the festival Resurrection, and performed "Killing in the Name" with Morello's band Prophets of Rage. Following the album's release, the band toured in support of it, culminating in a sold-out show to 10,000 fans at London's Alexandra Palace in February 2020. However, any further tour plans throughout 2020 were cancelled due to the COVID-19 pandemic, forcing a premature end to the End of Suffering album cycle.

In light of this period of unanticipated inactivity, the band unearthed archive recordings from their debut album Blossom and announced a reissue to celebrate the fifth anniversary of its release in June 2020. The reissue features live versions of the record's original ten tracks, in addition to three previously unreleased studio tracks. One of the unreleased tracks, "Fire", was released ahead of the reissue as the lead single, with the rest of the album following in October 2020.

=== Sticky, Dark Rainbow and hiatus (2021–2024) ===
Following the cancellation of any further tour plans in support of End of Suffering due to the COVID-19 pandemic, the band began working on new music. This culminated in the release of the single "My Town", featuring Idles frontman Joe Talbot in April 2021. The band then announced their fourth album, Sticky, alongside its eponymous single in July 2021. The record, released on 15 October 2021, was produced by guitarist and primary band member Dean Richardson and features further guest appearances from Lynks, Cassyette and Primal Scream frontman Bobby Gillespie.

In September 2023, the band announced their return with a new single, titled "Man of the Hour". It serves as the lead single from their fifth studio album Dark Rainbow, which was released on 26 January 2024. The band also announced a world tour in support of the album, to take place between February and May 2024 in the UK, Europe, Australia and North America.

It was announced in 4 October 2024 that the band would be entering an indefinite hiatus following the end of their October and November 2024 European tour.

== Musical style ==
The band's musical style has been associated with rock, punk rock and hardcore genres. According to Carter they "perfectly fill the gap between indie, punk and rock and roll." Carter has described the band's songwriting style as a mixture of all the musical genres the band likes, "pouring it together in a melting pot that is real and new." He told the BBC in 2017, "Punk to me is not a sound, it's not a fashion, it's not a lifestyle. It's a mindset. You either have it or you don't."

Frank Carter and the Rattlesnakes have cited influences including Queens of the Stone Age, Arctic Monkeys, Savages, the Stooges, Nirvana, the Distillers, American Nightmare, Glassjaw, PJ Harvey, Nick Cave and the Bad Seeds, Leonard Cohen, Daniel Johnston, Dizzee Rascal, Deftones, Elton John and the Amazing Snakeheads.

== Performances ==
Carter is known as a dynamic live performer, delivering high-energy sets. The band has also aimed to foster a safe, respectful, and inclusive environment at their live performances. They encourage equality and empowerment with their fans, with Carter calling for only female and non-binary fans to crowdsurf in a safe environment during certain songs. In 2019 Carter was quoted as saying, "Rock gigs have been dominated by men for years - all bands need to work to empower women."

The Rattlesnakes' first tour was the Rotten UK Tour from May to June 2015. In March 2016 they toured the UK and Ireland. They performed on the Kerrang! Tour 2016 in support of Sum 41. In February 2017, they supported Biffy Clyro on tour. In October 2017, the band cancelled their North American tour, following the cancellation of four weeks of touring in Europe, so that Carter could focus on his mental health and wellbeing. The band had to pull out of some shows in the summer of 2018, including the INmusic Festival in Croatia, after they were involved in a bus crash.

After playing a surprise set at Reading Festival in 2018, the band played the festival's main stage in 2019. In the spring and summer of 2019, they toured the UK and Europe, and performed at the Hellendoorn Dauwpop Festival, Primavera Sound, Deichbrand, and Sziget Festival. They supported Foo Fighters on their 2019 European Tour, and supported Bring Me the Horizon on their 2019 Australia Tour. The band headlined the 2019 Monster Energy Outbreak Tour. Their 2019 North American tour was set to begin on 23 September 2019 in New York City, with The Beaches as the opening band on most dates, but the tour was cancelled due to Carter being in a car crash several days before the first show. The band's final shows prior to the pandemic consisted of three sold-out UK shows in February 2020 at the Alexandra Palace, Glasgow's Barrowlands and the Manchester Academy.

== Members ==
Current members

- Frank Carter – lead vocals (2015–present)
- Dean "Deano" Richardson – guitar, synthesizer, piano, backing vocals (2015–present)

Current touring and session musicians

- Tom "Tank" Barclay – bass, keyboards, synthesizer, backing vocals (2016–present)
- Gareth Grover – drums (2016–present)
- Elliot "El" Russell – guitar, keyboards, synthesizer, backing vocals (2019–present)

Former members

- Memby Jago – drums (2015–2016)
- Thomas "Mitch" Mitchener – guitars, synthesizer, keyboards, tambourine, backing vocals (2017–2018), bass (2015–2016)
- Aaron McKenzie - bass (2016)
- Sam Lidington - drums (2016)
- Will Taylor - drums (2018)

== Discography ==
=== Studio albums ===
Title	Album details	Peak chart positions		
Title	Album details	UK	AUS	BEL (FL)
Blossom	Released: 14 August 2015; Label: International Death Cult; Formats: LP, CD, digital download	18	81	—
Modern Ruin	Released: 20 January 2017; Label: International Death Cult; Formats: LP, CD, digital download	7	—	108
End of Suffering	Released: 3 May 2019; Label: International Death Cult; Formats: LP, CD, digital download, cassette	4	— (Note: End of Suffering did not enter the ARIA Albums Chart, but peaked at number 36 on the ARIA Digital Album Chart.)	177
Sticky	Released: 15 October 2021; Label: International Death Cult; Formats: LP, CD, digital download, cassette	8	—	189
Dark Rainbow	Released: 26 January 2024; Label: International Death Cult; Formats: LP, CD, digital download, cassette	10	—	—

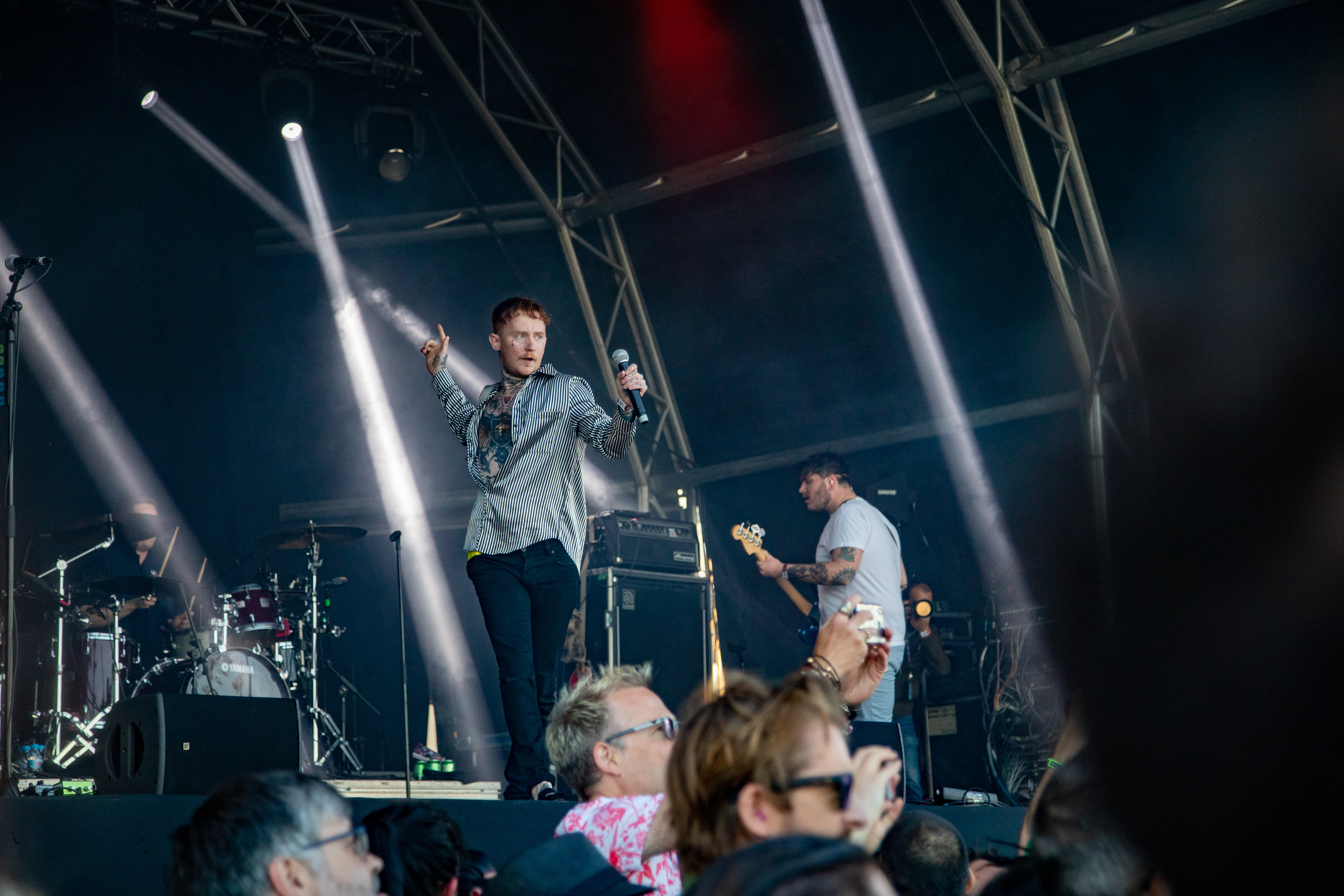
Frank Carter & The Rattlesnakes at Primavera Sound 2019

=== Live albums ===
Title	Album details
23 Live at Brixton Academy	Released: 9 March 2018; Label: International Death Cult; Formats: Digital download
End of Suffering Live to Vinyl	Released: 20 June 2020; Label: International Death Cult; Formats: 10"

=== Extended plays ===
Title	EP details
Rotten	Released: 4 May 2015; Label: International Death Cult; Formats: Digital download
Loss	Released: 16 April 2016; Label: International Death Cult; Formats: 7"
EOS_REMIXES_001	Released: 7 February 2020; Label: International Death Cult; Formats: Digital download

=== Singles ===
- "Juggernaut" (2015)
- "I Hate You" (2015)
- "Devil Inside Me" (2016)
- "Snake Eyes" (2016)
- "Lullaby" (2016)
- "Wild Flowers" (2016)
- "Modern Ruin" (2017)
- "Vampires" (2017)
- "Spray Paint Love" (2017)
- "Crowbar" (2019)
- "Anxiety" (2019)
- "Kitty Sucker" (2019)
- "Fire" (2020)
- "My Town" (featuring Joe Talbot) (2021)
- "The Drugs" (2022)
- "Parasite" (2022)
- "Man of the Hour" (2023)
- "Brambles" (2023)
- "Self Love" (2024)

=== Music videos ===
- "Juggernaut" (2015)
- "Trouble" (2015)
- "Devil Inside Me" (2016)
- "Snake Eyes" (2016)
- "Lullaby" (2016)
- "Wild Flowers" (2017)
- "Vampires" (2017)
- "Spray Paint Love" (2017)
- "Crowbar" (2019)
- "Anxiety" (2019)
- "Kitty Sucker" (2019)
- "Fire" (2020)
- "My Town" (2021)
- ”The Drugs” (2022)
- ”Parasite” (2022)
- "Man of the Hour" (2023)
- "Brambles" (2023)
- "Self Love" (2024)

== Awards and nominations ==
Year	Organisation	Award	Result
2016	Kerrang! Awards	Spirit of Punk	Won
2017	Heavy Music Awards	Best UK Band	Nominated
2017	Association of Independent Festivals Awards	Live Act of the Year	Nominated
2019	Kerrang! Awards	Best British Live Act	Nominated
2022	Berlin Music Video Awards	Best Song	Nominated
