= Can't Swim =

Post-hardcore band from Keansburg, New Jersey

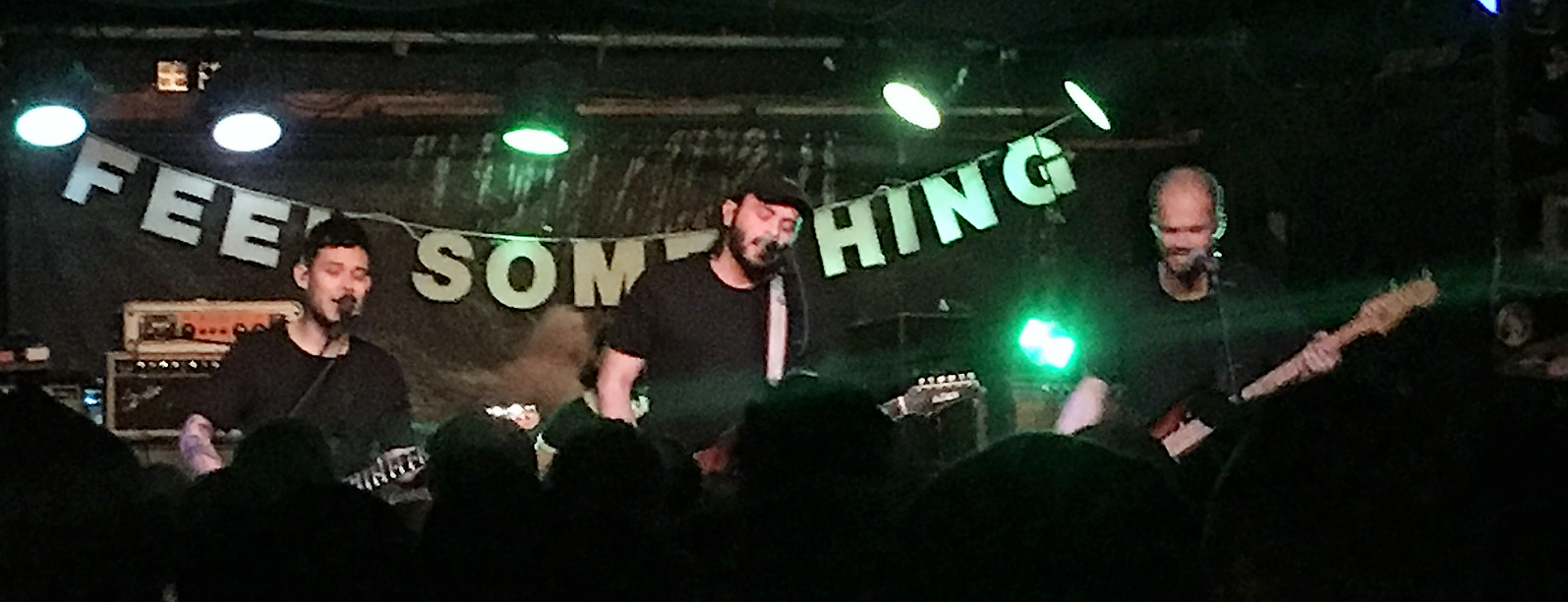
- Can't Swim in KC, MO in March 2018

Background information
- Origin: Keansburg, New Jersey, U.S.
- Genres: Post hardcore; pop punk; alternative rock; emo pop; post-punk; indie rock
- Years active: 2015–present
- Label: Pure Noise
- Members: Greg McDevitt; Danny Rico; Blake Gamel
- Past members: Andrea Morgan; Michael Sichel; Mike Sanchez; Chris LoPorto
- Website: cantswim.net

Can't Swim is an American post-hardcore and pop-punk band from Keansburg, New Jersey. The band consists of bassist Greg McDevitt, guitarist/backing vocalist Danny Rico, and drummer Blake Gamel; Chris LoPorto, the band's founding member, lead singer, and primary songwriter, departed the band in December 2024. The band has released four extended plays and four full-length studio albums, with the latest, Thanks but No Thanks, being released in 2023.

== History ==
=== Formation, signage, first EPs, and first tour (2015–2016) ===
Can't Swim formed in the spring of 2015, in Keansburg, New Jersey. Can't Swim started as a solo endeavor of Chris LoPorto, who had previously played drums in several hardcore punk bands including Trash Talk and Back & Forth; LoPorto taught himself how to play guitar to perform in Can't Swim before evolving the project into a full band since, prior, LoPorto had never been a frontman, vocalist, or guitarist. The band's lineup originally consisted of Chris LoPorto on lead vocals and guitar, Mike Sanchez on guitar, Danny Rico on drums, and Greg McDevitt on bass.

Can't Swim signed to Pure Noise Records in December 2015, before they ever performed in a concert. Following the signing, according to LoPorto, the band immediately bought gear, purchased a van, and began touring. Can't Swim released their first EP a few months later in 2016, titled Death Deserves a Name. They embarked on a tour in March 2016 alongside Four Year Strong.

=== Debut full-length album (2017–2018) ===
In February 2017, the band announced plans to release their debut studio album. The album, Fail You Again, was released on March 10, 2017. Also in 2017, the band hired a new drummer, Andrea Morgan; Danny Rico subsequently became the band's guitarist and backing vocalist.

On October 4, 2018, the band released a new single titled "My Queen," with an accompanying music video for the single. They also released an album, titled This Too Won't Pass, on November 16, 2018; the album was produced entirely by the band's guitarist, Danny Rico. Afterwards, they toured with Microwave. Chris LoPorto stated in a 2018 interview that he stopped playing guitar around that time and started exclusively singing vocals, as he felt that in addition to his vocal duties becoming more demanding, he was also redundantly serving the same purpose as Michael Sanchez, the band's guitarist; including LoPorto, the band had three guitarists at the time.

=== Experimentation with genres and departure of Chris LoPorto (2019–present) ===
On October 11, 2019, Can't Swim released a new EP titled Foreign Language. The EP features a heavier sound than that which the band had utilized in previous releases; the EP also featured guest vocals from other musicians in their scene, including Adam Lazzara, Spencer Pollard, Frank Carter, and Drew Dijorio. On May 6, 2020, Can't Swim released a new four-song EP titled When the Dust Settles, which featured newly-arranged acoustic tracks taken from their previous releases. On December 4, 2020, Can't Swim released their fourth EP, Someone Who Isn't Me, in which they explored a more electronic-oriented sound than previous releases. A review from Kerrang! granted Someone Who Isn't Me 3 out of 5 stars and called it "experimental".

On October 22, 2021, Can't Swim released their third full-length album, Change of Plans, utilizing a sound that combined elements from all their previous releases. In 2022, the band embarked on a tour which included several stops in the United Kingdom. On March 3, 2023, Can't Swim released their fourth album, Thanks but No Thanks, and subsequently embarked on a tour that spring headlined by Free Throw, alongside Equipment, Heart to Gold, and Early Humans. In October 2024, Can't Swim released a single, "Worst Ain't Over Yet," with an accompanying music video directed by their new drummer, Blake Gamel. At the time of the single's release, the band was on tour with Real Friends.

In December 2024, several fans leveled accusations of sexual misconduct against Chris LoPorto on social media. While the band's public relations agency refused to comment on the situation, on December 9, LoPorto issued an apology on the band's Instagram page and announced his departure from the band. In the aftermath of the misconduct allegations, Can't Swim canceled and withdrew from several concerts scheduled to take place in 2025; a band alongside whom they were scheduled to tour in 2025, Knuckle Puck, also removed Can't Swim from a promotional flyer for that upcoming tour.

== Style and songwriting ==
Reviewers and music sites have labeled Can't Swim as a rock and punk rock band. Despite LoPorto's background in hardcore punk bands, Can't Swim adopted a relatively less heavy sound while still performing within punk subgenres, primarily post-hardcore, pop-punk, and emo, but also including alternative rock, emo pop, and post-punk. Reviewers have also noted the band's willingness to experiment with other genres within their releases, including indie rock, hardcore punk, and electronic dance music.

In 2023, a reviewer with Kerrang! compared Can't Swim's sound in Thanks but No Thanks to As It Is, Anberlin, and Jimmy Eat World, while Rico stated the band had occasionally "[pulled] from legends" including Jimmy Eat World, The Replacements, Blink-182, The Lemonheads, The Cure, and Saves the Day. As the band's hometown, Keansburg, is located between Philadelphia and New York City, Rico stated in an interview that he considered Can't Swim's sound to be a "melting pot" of influences from bands central to both cities' punk scenes.

Chris LoPorto was the band's primary songwriter. His lyrics explored topics and themes including personal experiences, the mental effects of touring, existential angst, and anger. When asked in an interview if he hoped his lyrics would "inspire other men to share their emotions," LoPorto responded that he hoped his songwriting would "inspire men and women to start their own band or creative endeavors".

== Band members ==
=== Current members ===
- Greg McDevitt – bass, backing vocals (2015–present)
- Danny Rico – guitar, backing vocals (2017–present), drums (2015–2017)
- Blake Gamel – drums (2021–present)

=== Former members ===
- Andrea Morgan – drums (2017–2018)
- Michael Sichel – drums (2018–2021)
- Mike "Chez" Sanchez – guitar (2015–2023)
- Chris LoPorto – lead vocals (2015–2024)

== Discography ==
Studio albums

- Fail You Again (2017)
- This Too Won't Pass (2018)
- Change of Plans (2021)
- Thanks but No Thanks (2023)

EPs

- Death Deserves a Name (2016)
- Foreign Language (2019)
- When the Dust Settles (2020)
- Someone Who Isn't Me (2020)
