= List of pop-punk albums =

The following is a list of pop-punk studio albums by notable artists that have been described as such by music reviews or any similar source. They are listed in chronological order.

Contents
- 1970s
- 1980s
- 1990s
- 2000s
- 2010s
- 2020s

== 1970s ==
Year	Artist	Album
1976	Ramones	Ramones
1977	Ramones	Leave Home
1977	Ramones	Rocket to Russia
1978	Generation X	Generation X
1978	Buzzcocks	Another Music in a Different Kitchen
1978	The Lurkers	Fulham Fallout
1978	The Rezillos	Can't Stand the Rezillos
1978	Ramones	Road to Ruin
1978	Buzzcocks	Love Bites
1978	The Dickies	The Incredible Shrinking Dickies
1979	Buzzcocks	Singles Going Steady
1979	The Damned	Machine Gun Etiquette
1979	Generation X	Valley of the Dolls
1979	Stiff Little Fingers	Inflammable Material
1979	The Undertones	The Undertones

== 1980s ==
Year	Artist	Album
1980	The Undertones	Hypnotised
1981	Holly and the Italians	The Right to Be Italian
1982	Descendents	Milo Goes to College
1982	Misfits	Walk Among Us
1982	The Adicts	Sound of Music
1983	Social Distortion	Mommy's Little Monster
1983	The Jam	Snap!
1984	Shonen Knife	Yama-no Attchan
1985	Descendents	I Don't Want To Grow Up
1986	Descendents	Enjoy!
1986	Shonen Knife	Pretty Little Baka Guy
1987	Fastbacks	...And His Orchestra
1987	Red Kross	Neurotica
1987	Descendents	All
1988	Screeching Weasel	Boogadaboogadaboogada!
1989
1989	The Lemonheads	Lick
1989	Big Drill Car	CD Type Thing
1989	The Fiendz	We're the Fiendz
1989	Groovie Ghoulies	Appetite for Adrenochrome
1989	Snuff	Snuff Said

== 1990s ==
Year	Artist	Album
1990	Green Day	39/Smooth
1990	The Lemonheads	Lovey
1990	Jawbreaker	Unfun
1991	Big Drill Car	Batch
1991	The Fiendz	Wact
1991	Operation Ivy	Operation Ivy
1991	Screeching Weasel	My Brain Hurts
1992	Green Day	Kerplunk
1992	The Lemonheads	It's a Shame About Ray
1992	The Hanson Brothers	Gross Misconduct
1992	NOFX	White Trash, Two Heebs and a Bean
1993	All	Breaking Things
1993	Pennywise	Unknown Road
1993	The Queers	Love Songs for the Retarded
1993	The Muffs	The Muffs
1993	Buzzcocks	Trade Test Transmissions
1993	J Church	Quetzalcoatl
1994	Bad Religion	Stranger Than Fiction
1994	Plow United	Plow United
1994	Green Day	Dookie
1994	Jawbreaker	24 Hour Revenge Therapy
1994	The Offspring	Smash
1994	Weezer	Weezer
1994	Pollen	Bluette
1994	Parasites	Pair
1994	NOFX	Punk in Drublic
1994	Bowling for Soup	Bowling for Soup
1994	Dodgy	Homegrown
1994	MxPx	Pokinatcha
1994	Ash	Trailer
1994	Pinhead Gunpowder	Carry the Banner
1994	Groovie Ghoulies	Born in the Basement
1995	The Dickies	Idjit Savant
1995	Blink-182	Cheshire Cat
1995	No Use for a Name	¡Leche con Carne!
1995	All	Pummel
1995	The Muffs	Blonder and Blonder
1995	The Vandals	Live Fast, Diarrhea
1995	Ramones	¡Adios Amigos!
1995	Weston	A Real-Life Story of Teenage Rebellion
1995	Rancid	...And Out Come the Wolves
1995	Jawbreaker	Dear You
1995	Lifetime	Hello Bastards
1995	Spiderbait	The Unfinished Spanish Galleon of Finley Lake
1995	Green Day	Insomniac
1995	No Doubt	Tragic Kingdom
1995	Millencolin	Life on a Plate
1995	J Church	Arbor Vitae
1995	Gaunt	Yeah, Me Too
1995	Lagwagon	Hoss
1996	Goldfinger	Goldfinger
1996	MxPx	Life in General
1996	The Mr. T Experience	Love Is Dead
1996	Snuff	Demmamussabebonk
1996	Weston	Got Beat Up
1996	Ash	1977
1996	The Queers	Don't Back Down
1996	Descendents	Everything Sucks
1996	Weezer	Pinkerton
1996	J Church	The Drama of Alienation
1997	Goldfinger	Hang-Ups
1997	Discount	Half Fiction
1997	Shonen Knife	Brand New Knife
1997	Pennywise	Full Circle
1997	The Ataris	Anywhere but Here
1997	Kenickie	At the Club
1997	Lifetime	Jersey's Best Dancers
1997	Blink-182	Dude Ranch
1997	Harvey Danger	Where Have All the Merrymakers Gone?
1997	Me First and the Gimme Gimmes	Have a Ball
1997	Lagwagon	Double Plaidinum
1997	Smoking Popes	Destination Failure
1997	Weston	Matinee: Music from the Soundtrack
1997	Green Day	Nimrod
1997	Bowling for Soup	Rock on Honorable Ones!!
1998	The Suicide Machines	Battle Hymns
1998	Tuscadero	My Way or the Highway
1998	Chixdiggit	Born on the First of July
1998	Eve 6	Eve 6
1998	All	Mass Nerder
1998	Home Grown	Act Your Age
1998	MxPx	Slowly Going the Way of the Buffalo
1998	The Vandals	Hitler Bad, Vandals Good
1998	Less Than Jake	Hello Rockview
1998	Alkaline Trio	Goddamnit
1998	The Offspring	Americana
1998	Lagwagon	Let's Talk About Feelings
1999	Lit	A Place in the Sun
1999	Jimmy Eat World	Clarity
1999	The Lillingtons	Death by Television
1999	Bigwig	Stay Asleep
1999	Groovie Ghoulies	Fun in the Dark
1999	The Ataris	Blue Skies, Broken Hearts...Next 12 Exits
1999	Reggie and the Full Effect	Greatest Hits 1984–1987
1999	New Found Glory	Nothing Gold Can Stay
1999	The Bouncing Souls	Hopeless Romantic
1999	Screeching Weasel	Emo
1999	Blink-182	Enema of the State
1999	The Donnas	Get Skintight
1999	Face to Face	Standards & Practices
1999	Fenix TX	Fenix TX
1999	Buzzcocks	Modern
1999	The Get Up Kids	Something to Write Home About
1999	No Use for a Name	More Betterness!
1999	Eve 6	Horrorscope
1999	Saves the Day	Through Being Cool

== 2000s ==
Year	Artist	Album
2000	The Anniversary	Designing a Nervous Breakdown
2000	Midtown	Save the World, Lose the Girl
2000	Millencolin	Pennybridge Pioneers
2000	Goldfinger	Stomping Ground
2000	Alkaline Trio	Maybe I'll Catch Fire
2000	No Doubt	Return of Saturn
2000	Reggie and the Full Effect	Promotional Copy
2000	Relient K	Relient K
2000	MxPx	The Ever Passing Moment
2000	NOFX	Pump Up the Valuum
2000	J Church	One Mississippi
2000	Ace Troubleshooter	Ace Troubleshooter
2000	Wheatus	Wheatus
2000	Chixdiggit	From Scene to Shining Scene
2000	New Found Glory	New Found Glory
2000	The Presidents of the United States of America	Freaked Out and Small
2000	AFI	The Art of Drowning
2000	Good Charlotte	Good Charlotte
2000	Gob	The World According to Gob
2000	Green Day	Warning
2000	The Movielife	This Time Next Year
2000	The Offspring	Conspiracy of One
2000	Latterman	None of These Songs Are About Girls
2000	The Bomb	Torch Songs
2001	The Ataris	End Is Forever
2001	American Hi-Fi	American Hi-Fi
2001	Alkaline Trio	From Here to Infirmary
2001	Yellowcard	One for the Kids
2001	Ash	Free All Angels
2001	Sum 41	All Killer No Filler
2001	Weezer	Weezer
2001	Fenix TX	Lechuza
2001	The Bouncing Souls	How I Spent My Summer Vacation
2001	Blink-182	Take Off Your Pants and Jacket
2001	Saves the Day	Stay What You Are
2001	Jimmy Eat World	Bleed American
2001	Randy	The Human Atom Bombs
2001	Sugarcult	Start Static
2001	Relient K	The Anatomy of the Tongue in Cheek
2001	Brand New	Your Favorite Weapon
2001	Student Rick	Soundtrack for a Generation
2001	Lit	Atomic
2001	Mest	Destination Unknown
2001	Hey Mercedes	Everynight Fire Works
2002	Tsunami Bomb	The Ultimate Escape
2002	The Distillers	Sing Sing Death House
2002	Coheed and Cambria	The Second Stage Turbine Blade
2002	Alien Crime Syndicate	XL from Coast to Coast
2002	Joey Ramone	Don't Worry About Me
2002	Piebald	We Are the Only Friends We Have
2002	Orange Island	Everything You Thought You Knew
2002	Millencolin	Home from Home
2002	Simple Plan	No Pads, No Helmets...Just Balls
2002	Taking Back Sunday	Tell All Your Friends
2002	The Queers	Pleasant Screams
2002	Midtown	Living Well Is the Best Revenge
2002	Something Corporate	Leaving Through the Window
2002	Weezer	Maladroit
2002	Audio Karate	Space Camp
2002	Avril Lavigne	Let Go
2002	Ace Troubleshooter	The Madness of the Crowds
2002	New Found Glory	Sticks and Stones
2002	Home Grown	Kings of Pop
2002	Reel Big Fish	Cheer Up!
2002	The Starting Line	Say It Like You Mean It
2002	Subb	Daylight Saving
2002	My Chemical Romance	I Brought You My Bullets, You Brought Me Your Love
2002	Halo Friendlies	Get Real
2002	Bowling for Soup	Drunk Enough to Dance
2002	Greyfield	Soundtrack to the Summer
2002	Plain White T's	Stop
2002	Treble Charger	Detox
2002	The Travoltas	Endless Summer
2002	Manda and the Marbles	More Seduction
2002	OK Go	OK Go
2002	Busted	Busted
2002	Goldfinger	Open Your Eyes
2002	Good Charlotte	The Young and the Hopeless
2002	Allister	Last Stop Suburbia
2002	The All-American Rejects	The All-American Rejects
2002	SR-71	Tomorrow
2002	The Donnas	Spend the Night
2002	Kelly Osbourne	Shut Up
2002	Sum 41	Does This Look Infected?
2002	Lucky 7	Lucky 7
2002	Motion City Soundtrack	I Am the Movie
2003	Reggie and the Full Effect	Under the Tray
2003	American Hi-Fi	The Art of Losing
2003	The Movielife	Forty Hour Train Back to Penn
2003	Snuff	Disposable Income
2003	The Ataris	So Long, Astoria
2003	Relient K	Two Lefts Don't Make a Right...but Three Do
2003	Buzzcocks	Buzzcocks
2003	Sixty Stories	Anthem Red
2003	Fall Out Boy	Take This to Your Grave
2003	Less Than Jake	Anthem
2003	The Jealous Sound	Kill Them with Kindness
2003	Mest	Mest
2003	Rufio	MCMLXXXV
2003	Tokyo Rose	Reinventing a Lost Art
2003	FM Static	What Are You Waiting For?
2003	Yellowcard	Ocean Avenue
2003	Cauterize	So Far From Real
2003	Inspection 12	Get Rad
2003	MxPx	Before Everything & After
2003	Story of the Year	Page Avenue
2003	Boys Night Out	Make Yourself Sick
2003	The Lawrence Arms	The Greatest Story Ever Told
2003	Matchbook Romance	Stories and Alibis
2003	The Network	Money Money 2020
2003	Groovie Ghoulies	Monster Club
2003	The Copyrights	We Didn't Come Here to Die
2003	Hey Mercedes	Loses Control
2003	Lucky Boys Confusion	Commitment
2003	Something Corporate	North
2003	Busted	A Present for Everyone
2003	Blink-182	Blink-182
2004	Bayside	Sirens and Condolences
2004	Descendents	Cool to Be You
2004	Northstar	Pollyanna
2004	The Matches	E. Von Dahl Killed the Locals
2004	Social Code	A Year at the Movies
2004	Avril Lavigne	Under My Skin
2004	New Found Glory	Catalyst
2004	Ellegarden	Pepperoni Quattro
2004	My Chemical Romance	Three Cheers for Sweet Revenge
2004	The Ergs!	Dorkrockcorkrod
2004	Midtown	Forget What You Know
2004	The Gamits	Antidote
2004	The F-Ups	The F-Ups
2004	Ashlee Simpson	Autobiography
2004	Taking Back Sunday	Where You Want to Be
2004	Say Anything	...Is a Real Boy
2004	Head Automatica	Decadence
2004	Green Day	American Idiot
2004	Good Charlotte	The Chronicles of Life and Death
2004	The Explosion	Black Tape
2004	Sum 41	Chuck
2004	Jimmy Eat World	Futures
2004	Simple Plan	Still Not Getting Any...
2004	Relient K	Mmhmm
2004	The Fight	Nothing New Since Rock 'n' Roll
2004	The Methadones	Not Economically Viable
2004	Bankrupt	Bad Hair Day
2005	Plain White T's	All That We Needed
2005	The Academy Is...	Almost Here
2005	Reggie and the Full Effect	Songs Not to Get Married To
2005	Fall Out Boy	From Under the Cork Tree
2005	Weezer	Make Believe
2005	Alkaline Trio	Crimson
2005	Amber Pacific	The Possibility and the Promise
2005	The Story Changes	Last Night a Rock Band Saved My Life
2005	Vanilla Sky	Waiting for Something
2005	MxPx	Panic
2005	Motion City Soundtrack	Commit This to Memory
2005	The Aquabats	Charge!!
2005	The All-American Rejects	Move Along
2005	Rufio	The Comfort of Home
2005	Cauterize	Paper Wings
2005	Paramore	All We Know Is Falling
2005	Latterman	No Matter Where We Go...!
2005	Hedley	Hedley
2005	Man Alive	Open Surgery
2005	Tokio Hotel	Schrei
2005	Cartel	Chroma
2005	Panic! at the Disco	A Fever You Can't Sweat Out
2005	The Veronicas	The Secret Life Of...
2005	Mest	Photographs
2005	Goldfinger	Disconnection Notice
2005	Lagwagon	Resolve
2005	Bowling for Soup	Bowling for Soup Goes to the Movies
2005	Better Luck Next Time	Third Time's a Charm
2006	Yellowcard	Lights and Sounds
2006	The Loved Ones	Keep Your Heart
2006	The Lawrence Arms	Oh! Calcutta!
2006	The Measure (SA)	Historical Fiction
2006	Hawk Nelson	Smile, It's the End of the World
2006	Hit the Lights	This Is a Stick Up... Don't Make It a Murder
2006	Saves the Day	Sound the Alarm
2006	Taking Back Sunday	Louder Now
2006	Forgive Durden	Wonderland
2006	Less Than Jake	In with the Out Crowd
2006	The Ergs!	Jersey's Best Prancers
2006	Patent Pending	Save Each Other, the Whales Are Doing Fine
2006	Cute Is What We Aim For	The Same Old Blood Rush with a New Touch
2006	I Voted for Kodos	My New Obsession
2006	Set Your Goals	Mutiny!
2006	The Adored	A New Language
2006	The Awesome Snakes	Venom
2006	FM Static	Critically Ashamed
2006	Hellogoodbye	Zombies! Aliens! Vampires! Dinosaurs!
2006	Boys Like Girls	Boys Like Girls
2006	Plain White T's	Every Second Counts
2006	Daggermouth	Stallone
2006	Marianas Trench	Fix Me
2006	The Lillingtons	The Too Late Show
2006	My Chemical Romance	The Black Parade
2006	Flashlight Brown	Blue
2006	Bowling for Soup	The Great Burrito Extortion Case
2006	Ellegarden	Eleven Fire Crackers
2006	+44	When Your Heart Stops Beating
2006	Jonas Brothers	It's About Time
2007	A Day to Remember	For Those Who Have Heart
2007	Fall Out Boy	Infinity on High
2007	Lifetime	Lifetime
2007	The Queers	Munki Brain
2007	Anberlin	Cities
2007	Relient K	Five Score and Seven Years Ago
2007	The Copyrights	Make Sound
2007	The Fades	The Fades
2007	Avril Lavigne	The Best Damn Thing
2007	Social Code	Social-Code
2007	The Ergs!	Upstairs/Downstairs
2007	The Swellers	My Everest
2007	Paramore	Riot!
2007	The Leftovers	On the Move
2007	Broadway Calls	Broadway Calls
2007	The Methadones	This Won't Hurt...
2007	Mayday Parade	A Lesson in Romantics
2007	Yellowcard	Paper Walls
2007	Sum 41	Underclass Hero
2007	Vanilla Sky	Changes
2007	The Menzingers	A Lesson in the Abuse of Information Technology
2007	The Starting Line	Direction
2007	Better Luck Next Time	Start from Skratch
2007	Four Year Strong	Rise or Die Trying
2007	Motion City Soundtrack	Even If It Kills Me
2007	New Found Glory	From the Screen to Your Stereo Part II
2007	All Time Low	So Wrong, It's Right
2007	We the Kings	We the Kings
2007	Relient K	Let It Snow, Baby... Let It Reindeer
2007	Say Anything	In Defense of the Genre
2007	Saves the Day	Under the Boards
2007	The Wonder Years	Get Stoked on It!
2008	Teenage Bottlerocket	Warning Device
2008	Simple Plan	Simple Plan
2008	Transit	This Will Not Define Us
2008	The Copyrights	Learn the Hard Way
2008	Cute Is What We Aim For	Rotation
2008	Alkaline Trio	Agony & Irony
2008	Goldfinger	Hello Destiny...
2008	Hit the Lights	Skip School, Start Fights
2008	Banner Pilot	Resignation Day
2008	Bayside	Shudder
2008	You Me at Six	Take Off Your Colours
2008	Senses Fail	Life Is Not a Waiting Room
2008	Dillinger Four	Civil War
2008	Forgive Durden	Razia's Shadow: A Musical
2008	Fall Out Boy	Folie à Deux
2008	The All-American Rejects	When the World Comes Down
2008	Forever the Sickest Kids	Underdog Alma Mater
2009	A Day to Remember	Homesick
2009	Marianas Trench	Masterpiece Theatre
2009	New Found Glory	Not Without a Fight
2009	Fireworks	All I Have to Offer Is My Own Confusion
2009	Shook Ones	The Unquotable A.M.H.
2009	Forever the Sickest Kids	Underdog Alma Mater
2009	The Dangerous Summer	Reach for the Sun
2009	Green Day	21st Century Breakdown
2009	A Loss for Words	The Kids Can't Lose
2009	Taking Back Sunday	New Again
2009	The Leftovers	Eager to Please
2009	Parasites	Solitary
2009	All Time Low	Nothing Personal
2009	Billy Talent	Billy Talent III
2009	Jennifer Rostock	Der Film
2009	Four Year Strong	Explains It All
2009	Set Your Goals	This Will Be the Death of Us
2009	Broadway Calls	Good Views, Bad News
2009	Banner Pilot	Collapser
2009	Boys Like Girls	Love Drunk
2009	Paramore	Brand New Eyes
2009	The Swellers	Ups and Downsizing
2009	Tokio Hotel	Humanoid
2009	Mayday Parade	Anywhere but Here
2009	Bowling for Soup	Sorry for Partyin'
2009	The Summer Set	Love Like This
2009	This Time Next Year	Road Maps and Heart Attacks
2009	We the Kings	Smile Kid
2009	Better Luck Next Time	A Lifetime of Learning

== 2010s ==
Year	Artist	Album
2010	RVIVR	RVIVR
2010	You Me at Six	Hold Me Down
2010	Motion City Soundtrack	My Dinosaur Life
2010	The Wonder Years	The Upsides
2010	Shonen Knife	Free Time
2010	Story of the Year	The Constant
2010	Alkaline Trio	This Addiction
2010	Four Year Strong	Enemy of the World
2010	The Dopamines	Expect the Worst
2010	Man Overboard	Real Talk
2010	Thieves and Villains	South America
2010	Wavves	King of the Beach
2010	Transit	Keep This to Yourself
2010	Attack! Attack!	The Latest Fashion
2010	Good Charlotte	Cardiology
2010	Chunk! No, Captain Chunk!	Something for Nothing
2010	The Gamits	Parts
2010	A Day to Remember	What Separates Me from You
2010	My Chemical Romance	Danger Days: The True Lives of the Fabulous Killjoys
2011	The Hotelier	It Never Goes Out
2011	Joyce Manor	Joyce Manor
2011	Hawk Nelson	Crazy Love
2011	Red City Radio	The Dangers of Standing Still
2011	Forever the Sickest Kids	Forever the Sickest Kids
2011	Go Radio	Lucky Street
2011	Screeching Weasel	First World Manifesto
2011	Panic! at the Disco	Vices & Virtues
2011	Yellowcard	When You're Through Thinking, Say Yes
2011	Sum 41	Screaming Bloody Murder
2011	Title Fight	Shed
2011	Sparks the Rescue	Worst Thing I've Been Cursed With
2011	Living with Lions	Holy Shit
2011	Fireworks	Gospel
2011	The Swellers	Good for Me
2011	The Wonder Years	Suburbia I've Given You All and Now I'm Nothing
2011	Simple Plan	Get Your Heart On!
2011	The Story So Far	Under Soil and Dirt
2011	Set Your Goals	Burning at Both Ends
2011	Tenement	Napalm Dream
2011	The Summer Set	Everything's Fine
2011	Zebrahead	Get Nice!
2011	The Copyrights	North Sentinel Island
2011	The Subways	Money and Celebrity
2011	Blink-182	Neighborhoods
2011	Man Overboard	Man Overboard
2011	This Time Next Year	Drop Out of Life
2011	You Me at Six	Sinners Never Sleep
2011	Mayday Parade	Mayday Parade
2011	New Found Glory	Radiosurgery
2011	Transit	Listen & Forgive
2011	We Are the In Crowd	Best Intentions
2011	Tonight Alive	What Are You So Scared Of?
2011	A Loss for Words	No Sanctuary
2011	Marianas Trench	Ever After
2012	Hit the Lights	Invicta
2012	MxPx	Plans Within Plans
2012	Dan Vapid and the Cheats	Dan Vapid and the Cheats
2012	Joyce Manor	Of All Things I Will Soon Grow Tired
2012	The Forecast	Everybody Left
2012	Eve 6	Speak in Code
2012	Swearin'	Swearin'
2012	Shonen Knife	Pop Tune
2012	Motion City Soundtrack	Go
2012	Lit	The View from the Bottom
2012	The Dopamines	Vices
2012	I Call Fives	I Call Fives
2012	The Offspring	Days Go By
2012	The Early November	In Currents
2012	Forever Came Calling	Contender
2012	Masked Intruder	Masked Intruder
2012	Yellowcard	Southern Air
2012	Such Gold	Misadventures
2012	Billy Talent	Dead Silence
2012	Set It Off	Cinematics
2012	Go Radio	Close the Distance
2012	Green Day	¡Uno!
2012	Handguns	Angst
2012	All Time Low	Don't Panic
2012	Hostage Calm	Please Remain Calm
2012	Green Day	¡Dos!
2012	Pentimento	Pentimento
2012	Modern Baseball	Sports
2012	Green Day	¡Tré!
2013	Captain, We're Sinking	The Future Is Cancelled
2013	Frightened Rabbit	Pedestrian Verse
2013	The Lovely Bad Things	The Late Great Whatever
2013	The Story So Far	What You Don't See
2013	Wavves	Afraid of Heights
2013	Alkaline Trio	My Shame Is True
2013	Paramore	Paramore
2013	Face to Face	Three Chords and a Half Truth
2013	Fall Out Boy	Save Rock and Roll
2013	Chunk! No, Captain Chunk!	Pardon My French
2013	The Wonder Years	The Greatest Generation
2013	Man Overboard	Heart Attack
2013	Citizen	Youth
2013	Light Years	I Won't Hold This Against You
2013	Forever the Sickest Kids	J.A.C.K.
2013	Tonight Alive	The Other Side
2013	Bowling for Soup	Lunch. Drunk. Love.
2013	Saves the Day	Saves the Day
2013	Better Off	(I Think) I'm Leaving
2013	A Day to Remember	Common Courtesy
2013	A Loss for Words	Before It Caves
2013	Mayday Parade	Monsters in the Closet
2013	Pup	Pup
2013	State Champs	The Finer Things
2013	Red City Radio	Titles
2013	Seaway	Hoser
2013	Reggie and the Full Effect	No Country for Old Musicians
2013	Ex Friends	Rules for Making Up Words
2014	Neck Deep	Wishful Thinking
2014	We Are the In Crowd	Weird Kids
2014	Fireworks	Oh, Common Life
2014	Sleeper Agent	About Last Night
2014	Somos	Temple of Plenty
2014	Shonen Knife	Overdrive
2014	Buzzcocks	The Way
2014	Masked Intruder	M.I.
2014	5 Seconds of Summer	5 Seconds of Summer
2014	Joyce Manor	Never Hungover Again
2014	Real Friends	Maybe This Place Is the Same and We're Just Changing
2014	Hostage Calm	Die on Stage
2014	New Found Glory	Resurrection
2014	Weezer	Everything Will Be Alright in the End
2014	Set It Off	Duality
2014	Trophy Eyes	Mend, Move On
2014	Such Gold	The New Sidewalk
2014	Chumped	Teenage Retirement
2014	Charli XCX	Sucker
2014	The Copyrights	Report
2015	Fall Out Boy	American Beauty/American Psycho
2015	The Subways	The Subways
2015	Colleen Green	I Want to Grow Up
2015	Hit the Lights	Summer Bones
2015	Teenage Bottlerocket	Tales from Wyoming
2015	All Time Low	Future Hearts
2015	Tom DeLonge	To the Stars... Demos, Odds and Ends
2015	Millencolin	True Brew
2015	Chunk! No, Captain Chunk!	Get Lost, Find Yourself
2015	As It Is	Never Happy, Ever After
2015	The Story So Far	The Story So Far
2015	Four Year Strong	Four Year Strong
2015	Tenement	Predatory Headlights
2015	Head Injuries	Bail
2015	Desaparecidos	Payola
2015	Wavves / Cloud Nothings	No Life for Me
2015	Man Overboard	Heavy Love
2015	Spraynard	Mable
2015	Knuckle Puck	Copacetic
2015	Neck Deep	Life's Not out to Get You
2015	The Wonder Years	No Closer to Heaven
2015	Motion City Soundtrack	Panic Stations
2015	Better Off	Milk
2015	Wavves	V
2015	Mayday Parade	Black Lines
2015	State Champs	Around the World and Back
2015	5 Seconds of Summer	Sounds Good Feels Good
2015	Marianas Trench	Astoria
2015	Seaway	Colour Blind
2015	The Max Levine Ensemble	Backlash, Baby
2016	Energy	Apparition Sound
2016	Roam	Backbone
2016	Simple Plan	Taking One for the Team
2016	Jarrod Alonge	Friendville
2016	Weezer	Weezer
2016	Modern Baseball	Holy Ghost
2016	PUP	The Dream Is Over
2016	Trash Boat	Nothing I Write You Can Change What You've Been Through
2016	With Confidence	Better Weather
2016	Blink-182	California
2016	Good Charlotte	Youth Authority
2016	Yellowcard	Yellowcard
2016	Bowling for Soup	Drunk Dynasty
2016	Green Day	Revolution Radio
2016	Sum 41	13 Voices
2016	Joyce Manor	Cody
2016	Jeff Rosenstock	Worry.
2016	Trophy Eyes	Chemical Miracle
2016	Waterparks	Double Dare
2017	AFI	AFI
2017	As It Is	Okay
2017	WSTR	Red, Green or Inbetween
2017	Creeper	Eternity, in Your Arms
2017	Charly Bliss	Guppy
2017	New Found Glory	Makes Me Sick
2017	Grayscale	Adornment
2017	All Time Low	Last Young Renegade
2017	Broadside	Paradise
2017	Rozwell Kid	Precious Art
2017	Teenage Bottlerocket	Stealing The Covers
2017	Goldfinger	The Knife
2017	Neck Deep	The Peace and the Panic
2017	Seaway	Vacation
2017	The Movielife	Cities In Search Of A Heart
2017	Makeout	The Good Life
2017	Knuckle Puck	Shapeshifter
2017	The Lillingtons	Stella Sapiente
2017	Roam	Great Heights & Nose Dives
2017	Anti-Flag	American Attraction
2017	Sleep On It	Overexposed
2018	Waterparks	Entertainment
2018	The Dangerous Summer	The Dangerous Summer
2018	Reggie and the Full Effect	41
2018	Good Charlotte	Generation Rx
2018	Story Untold	Waves
2018	State Champs	Living Proof
2018	Mayday Parade	Sunnyland
2018	Real Friends	Composure
2018	MxPx	MxPx
2018	Trophy Eyes	The American Dream
2018	As It Is	The Great Depression
2018	With Confidence	Love and Loathing
2019	Set It Off	Midnight
2019	Masked Intruder	III
2019	Teenage Bottlerocket	Stay Rad!
2019	PUP	Morbid Stuff
2019	The Dangerous Summer	Mother Nature
2019	Blink-182	Nine
2019	Bayside	Interrobang
2019	Waterparks	Fandom

== 2020s ==
Year	Artist	Album
2020	Mest	Masquerade
2020	Green Day	Father of All Motherfuckers
2020	Hot Mulligan	You'll Be Fine
2020	All Time Low	Wake Up, Sunshine
2020	The Used	Heartwork
2020	Neck Deep	All Distortions Are Intentional
2020	Machine Gun Kelly	Tickets to My Downfall
2021	NOFX	Single Album
2021	Olivia Rodrigo	Sour
2021	Jxdn	Tell Me About Tomorrow
2021	Chunk! No, Captain Chunk!	Gone Are The Good Days
2021	Mayday Parade	What It Means to Fall Apart
2022	As It Is	I Went to Hell and Back
2022	Avril Lavigne	Love Sux
2022	Machine Gun Kelly	Mainstream Sellout
2022	Simple Plan	Harder Than It Looks
2022	State Champs	Kings of the New Age
2022	Demi Lovato	Holy Fvck
2022	Ellegarden	The End of Yesterday
2023	Real Friends	There's Nothing Worse Than Too Late
2023	Story of the Year	Tear Me to Pieces
2023	All Time Low	Tell Me I'm Alive
2023	Fall Out Boy	So Much (for) Stardust
2023	Waterparks	Intellectual Property
2023	Hot Mulligan	Why Would I Watch
2023	Trophy Eyes	Suicide and Sunshine
2023	Olivia Rodrigo	Guts
2023	Busted	Greatest Hits 2.0
2023	Knuckle Puck	Losing What We Love
2023	Blink-182	One More Time...
2024	Green Day	Saviors
2024	Neck Deep	Neck Deep
2024	Alkaline Trio	Blood, Hair, and Eyeballs
2026	New Found Glory	Listen Up!

== See also ==
- List of pop-punk bands
- List of emo pop albums
