= List of emo pop albums =

The following is a list of emo pop studio albums by notable artists that have been described as such by music reviews, or any similar source. They are listed in chronological order.

Contents
- 1990s
- 2000s
- 2010s

== 1990s ==
Year	Artist	Album
1999	The Get Up Kids	Something to Write Home About
1999	Jebediah	Of Someday Shambles

== 2000s ==
Year	Artist	Album
2001	Jimmy Eat World	Bleed American
2001	Student Rick	Soundtrack for a Generation
2001	Thursday	Full Collapse
2001	Weezer	Weezer
2003	Armor for Sleep	Dream to Make Believe
2004	Avril Lavigne	Under My Skin
2004	This Providence	Our Worlds Divorce
2005	The Academy Is...	Almost Here
2005	Panic! at the Disco	A Fever You Can't Sweat Out
2006	Boys Like Girls	Boys Like Girls
2006	Hellogoodbye	Zombies! Aliens! Vampires! Dinosaurs!
2006	My Chemical Romance	The Black Parade
2006	Taking Back Sunday	Louder Now
2007	Paramore	Riot!
2008	The Academy Is...	Fast Times at Barrington High
2008	The All-American Rejects	When the World Comes Down
2008	The North Pole Project	The North Pole Project
2008	Secondhand Serenade	A Twist in My Story
2008	You Me at Six	Take Off Your Colours
2009	A Day to Remember	Homesick
2009	All Time Low	Nothing Personal
2009	Boys Like Girls	Love Drunk
2009	Cobra Starship	Hot Mess
2009	Paramore	Brand New Eyes
2009	A Rocket to the Moon	On Your Side
2009	The Summer Set	Love Like This

== 2010s ==
Year	Artist	Album
2010	Allstar Weekend	Suddenly Yours
2010	Anberlin	Dark Is the Way, Light Is a Place
2010	Never Shout Never	What Is Love?
2010	Secondhand Serenade	Hear Me Now
2010	Stereo Skyline	Stuck on Repeat
2010	VersaEmerge	Fixed at Zero
2010	The Wonder Years	The Upsides
2011	All Time Low	Dirty Work
2011	The Downtown Fiction	Let's Be Animals
2011	Panic! at the Disco	Vices & Virtues
2011	The Summer Set	Everything's Fine
2012	All Time Low	Don't Panic
2012	Joyce Manor	Of All Things I Will Soon Grow Tired
2013	Forever the Sickest Kids	J.A.C.K.
2013	Hawk Nelson	Made
2013	Saves the Day	Saves the Day
2013	The Summer Set	Legendary
2013	Tonight Alive	The Other Side
2014	Breathe Carolina	Savages
2014	The Ready Set	The Bad & The Better
2015	Mayday Parade	Black Lines
2019	Proper	I Spent the Winter Writing Songs About Getting Better

== 2020s ==
Year	Artist	Album
2022	August is Falling	The Simple Plan
2022	Avril Lavigne	Love Sux
