= Black Lines =

Studio album by Mayday Parade
- Released: October 9, 2015
- Recorded: March–May 2015
- Studio: Dreamland (Hurley, New York)
- Genres: Emo; emo pop; pop-punk
- Length: 44:06
- Label: Fearless
- Producer: Mike Sapone

Mayday Parade chronology
Monsters in the Closet (2013)	Black Lines (2015)	Sunnyland (2018)

Singles from Black Lines
- 1. "Keep in Mind, Transmogrification Is a New Technology" Released: July 31, 2015; 2. "Letting Go" Released: October 2, 2015

Black Lines is the fifth studio album by American rock band Mayday Parade. Recording was done between March and May 2015, with producer Mike Sapone in New York. "Keep in Mind, Transmogrification Is a New Technology" was released as the lead single in July. "Letting Go" was released as the second single in October with the album, released through Fearless, following shortly after. The album charted at number 21 on the US Billboard 200. This is the last album the band released on Fearless Records.

== Background ==
Mayday Parade released their fourth album, Monsters in the Closet in October 2013. While touring in support of that release, vocalist Derek Sanders thought the group was "beginning to become too predictable", and in an interview with Kerrang!, he claimed that Monsters in the Closest sounded "very similar" to their past material. This view was also expressed by the band's guitarist, Alex Garcia. For the follow-up album, Sanders "really wanted [it] to feel like something different." A turning point for the band came when they recorded a cover of the Bush song "Comedown" for the Punk Goes 90s Vol. 2 (2014) compilation album. The band tackled the song differently from their other recordings, recording it live-in-the-studio. Sanders thought this was "a much rawer way of recording" that the band haven't previously done.

== Composition ==
While the group, according to Garcia, "experiment[ed] with co-writers" in the past, they wanted to "become more internal", writing all of the songs on Black Lines by themselves. Kerrang! writer Paul Travers noted that while the band's past works were collections of pop rock songs, Black Lines had "a rawer, grittier sound with a more dynamic approach" to song structures. The album's sound has been described as emo, emo pop, pop-punk and rock. "One of Them Will Destroy the Other" features guest vocals from Real Friends' vocalist Dan Lambton. "Letting Go" is about "self pity and not having the strength to get over a bad relationship. It's about that weird spot when someone breaks you down even though you know they're toxic."

== Recording ==
In March 2015, the band started recording at Dreamland Recording Studios near Woodstock, New York with producer Mike Sapone. The studio was in fact a converted church. Guitarist Brooks Betts used his Fender Telecaster guitar, which has been used on all of the band's albums, while Garcia used his Gibson Les Paul and Fender Stratocaster guitars. The pair used a Marshall JCM800 amplifier. The pair used a number of effects pedals and frequently "switch[ed] them out", according to Garcia. One of two specific pedals they used was the Supermoon Reverb, which Garica "absolute love[d]". The other being the Kilobyte, which was used to create a lot of the ambient sounds heard on "One of Them Will Destroy the Other" and "Hollow". Despite this, they wanted to "avoid cluttering the sound" as much as possible.

Lambton recorded his vocals for "One of Them Will Destroy the Other" while Real Friends had an off-day from touring. The initial plan for the song was to have Lambton and Sanders do call and response vocals throughout it. On May 21, it was announced the band had finished recording. All of the songs were mixed by Vince Ratti, except for "Look Up and See Infinity, Look Down and See Nothing", which was mixed by Sapone. Claudius Mittendorfer and Sapone engineered the proceedings, with assistance from Zachary Casper and Bella Blasks. Stephen Marcussen mastered the album.

== Release ==
On July 17, 2015, Black Lines was announced for release, with the track listing and cover art revealed. The artwork was done by Wolfstache with art direction from Florian Mihr. On July 30, "Keep in Mind, Transmogrification Is a New Technology" was made available for streaming. A video for the song features an artist re-creating the album's cover art. A day later, it was released as a single. On August 28, a music video was released for "One of Them Will Destroy the Other", directed by Caleb Mallery. On October 1, "Letting Go" was made available for streaming, and was released as single a day later. Black Lines was released on October 9 through Fearless. (Note: U.S. Fearless FRL 30217) In October and November, the band is set to headline the 2015 edition of the Alternative Press tour, with support from Real Friends, As It Is, and This Wild Life.

In January and February 2016, the band went on a tour of Europe and the UK, with support from the Maine, Have Mercy and Beautiful Bodies. In March and April, the band went on a co-headlining US tour with the Maine with support from Better Off and the Technicolours. On March 29, a music video was released for "Letting Go". In May, the group performed at Slam Dunk Festival in the UK. Before embarking on the 2016 Warped Tour, a music video was released for "Let's Be Honest" on June 24, directed by Dan Fusselman. In July, the group appeared at the Alternative Press Music Awards.

== Reception ==
Professional ratings
Review scores
Source	Rating
AbsolutePunk	8.5/10
Alternative Addiction	3.5/5 stars
Alternative Press	Favorable
Contactmusic	3.5/5
idobi	7/10
theMusic	2.5/5 stars
Ultimate Guitar Archive	7.3/10

Sam Law of Kerrang! wrote the album highlighted the band's "absolute best bits", specifically mentioning "Hollow", "Underneath the Tide" and "All on Me". Law pondered about "hit singles" before concluding the group does not need "them when your record's as good as this throughout." Writing for Rock Sound, Mischa Pearlman wrote the band showed off "their versatility [...] to varying degrees of success." In some songs, such as "One of Them Will Destroy the Other" and "Keep in Mind, Transmogrification Is a New Technology", the group "cruise[d] comfortably [...] in full-on emo-pop mode." In others, namely "Hollow" and "All on Me", the band are "far more interesting and exciting." Overall, Pearlman closed with mention this "all makes for an ultimately uneven and unfocused journey, but one still worth investigating".

== Commercial performance ==
The album debuted at number 21 on the US Billboard 200. It also reached number one on the US Top Alternative Albums and Top Rock Albums charts. The album opened with first week sales of 16,000 copies. It also peaked at number 32 in Australia.

== Track listing ==
All tracks are written by Mayday Parade.

No.	Title	Length
1.	"One of Them Will Destroy the Other" (feat. Dan Lambton)	3:10
2.	"Just Out of Reach"	3:43
3.	"Hollow"	3:12
4.	"Letting Go"	3:50
5.	"Let's Be Honest"	3:51
6.	"Keep in Mind, Transmogrification Is a New Technology"	5:27
7.	"Narrow"	3:07
8.	"Underneath the Tide"	2:51
9.	"All on Me"	4:15
10.	"Until You're Big Enough"	3:15
11.	"Look Up and See Infinity, Look Down and See Nothing"	2:51
12.	"One of Us"	4:27
Total length:		43:59

== Personnel ==
Personnel per back panel.

Mayday Parade

- Derek Sanders – lead vocals, keyboards
- Alex Garcia – lead guitar
- Brooks Betts – rhythm guitar
- Jeremy Lenzo – bass guitar, vocals
- Jake Bundrick – drums, vocals

Additional musicians

- Dan Lambton (of Real Friends) – additional vocals on "One of Them Will Destroy the Other"

Production

- Mike Sapone – producer; mixing on "Look Up and See Infinity, Look Down and See Nothing"; engineer
- Vince Ratti – mixing on all songs except "Look Up and See Infinity, Look Down and See Nothing"
- Claudius Mitttendorfer – engineer
- Stephen Marcussen – mastering
- Zachary Casper – first assistant engineer
- Bella Blasks – second assistant engineer
- Wolfstache – artwork
- Florian Mihr – art direction, layout

== Charts ==
Chart performance for Black Lines
Chart (2015)	Peak position
Australian Albums (ARIA)	32
UK Albums (OCC)	107
UK Rock & Metal Albums (Official Charts)	9
US Billboard 200	21
US Top Alternative Albums (Billboard)	1
US Independent Albums (Billboard)	3
US Top Rock Albums (Billboard)	1
