= The Fades =

The Fades may refer to:

- The Fades (band), an English indie rock band
- The Fades (TV series), a British supernatural drama television series
