= Emo pop =

Fusion music genre combining together emo and pop punk

- Other names: Emo pop-punk
- Stylistic origins: Emo; pop-punk; pop
- Cultural origins: Mid-to-late 1990s, United States
- Typical instruments: Vocals; electric guitar; bass guitar; drum kit
- Derivative forms: Pop screamo

Regional scenes
- Midwestern United States · Florida · Arizona

Other topics
- List of bands; list of albums; crunkcore

Emo pop (alternatively typeset with a hyphen, also known as emo pop-punk and pop-emo) is a fusion genre combining emo with pop-punk, pop music, or both. Emo pop features a musical style with more concise composition and hook-filled choruses. Emo pop has its origins in the 1990s with bands like Jimmy Eat World, the Get Up Kids, Weezer and the Promise Ring. The genre entered the mainstream in the early 2000s with Jimmy Eat World's breakthrough album Bleed American, which included its song "The Middle". Other emo pop bands that achieved mainstream success throughout the decade included Fall Out Boy, the All-American Rejects, My Chemical Romance, Panic! at the Disco and Paramore. The popularity of emo pop declined in the 2010s, with some prominent artists in the genre either disbanding or abandoning the emo pop style.

== Characteristics ==
Emo pop is a fusion between emo and pop-punk characterized by "bright, emotional, and heavily singable" melodic composition. AllMusic describes emo pop as blending "youthful angst" with "slick production" and mainstream appeal, using "high-pitched melodies, rhythmic guitars, and confessional lyrics concerning adolescence, relationships, and heartbreak." MasterClass describes emo pop as featuring "soaring vocals and upbeat songs with melancholy lyrics." During the 2000s, emo pop artists would fuse the "lyrical and visual elements of emo with radio-friendly sonics of pop-punk." Quinn Villarreal of SiriusXM said: "If you were born between 1990 and 2000, this is the emo you know and heard feverishly across U.S. pop stations." Emo pop music is notably more commercially viable than other styles of emo due to its minimal influences from indie rock and hardcore punk, and less extreme use of loud/soft dynamics.

== History ==
=== Origins (1990s) ===
In the early 1990s, San Francisco Bay Area bands Samiam and Jawbreaker were creating an early form of emo pop. Jawbreaker has influenced future mainstream emo pop bands like Fall Out Boy and My Chemical Romance. Pop-punk band Blink-182 has been a very big influence on emo pop bands. The new generation of emo fans view the Blink-182 sound as "hugely influential," with James Montgomery writing, "[...] without them, there'd be no Fall Out Boy, no Paramore, or no Fueled by Ramen Records."

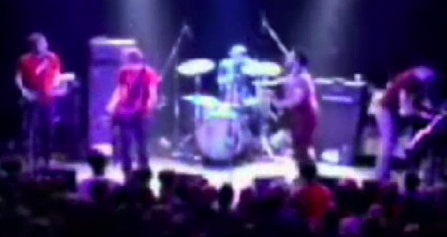
Emo pop band The Get Up Kids performing at the Bowery Ballroom in 2000

Emo pop's popularity began during the mid-to-late 1990s with bands like Jimmy Eat World, The Get Up Kids, Weezer and The Promise Ring. Weezer's Pinkerton (1996) is viewed by Spin as "a groundbreaking record for all the emo-pop that would follow" and went number 19 on the US Billboard 200 chart upon release. Jimmy Eat World pioneered an early emo pop sound in their album Clarity (1999). Both albums were very influential on later emo and emo pop bands. According to Nicole Keiper of CMJ, Sense Field's Building (1996) pushed the band "into the emo-pop camp with the likes of the Get Up Kids and Jejune". Emo pop began to have independent success in the late 1990s. The Get Up Kids had sold over 15,000 copies of their debut album Four Minute Mile (1997) before signing to Vagrant Records, who promoted the band strongly and put them on tours opening for popular rock acts such as Green Day and Weezer. Their album Something to Write Home About (1999) was a major success, reaching No. 31 on Billboard's Top Heatseekers chart.

=== Mainstream popularity (2000s) ===
AllMusic credits the birth of the mainstream success of emo pop to the 2001 release by Jimmy Eat World, Bleed American, and the success of the album's second single "The Middle." Weezer's second self-titled album received major commercial success in 2001 reaching number 4 on the US Billboard 200 chart. The same year, post-hardcore band Thursday released their sophomore album Full Collapse and reached 178 on the Billboard 200 charts. The album featured screaming and overall aggression, separating them from other emo pop bands. The All-American Rejects received mainstream success with their 2002 self-titled debut album. The album sold over a million copies in the US alone. It contained their hit song "Swing, Swing". Dashboard Confessional became a major act in the emo pop scene with their debut album The Swiss Army Romance (2000). The band would later receive commercial success with their albums A Mark, a Mission, a Brand, a Scar (2003) and Dusk and Summer (2006). Both albums were released under Vagrant Records which also released music by emo pop bands Saves The Day, the Get Up Kids, the Anniversary, Hey Mercedes, Hot Rod Circuit and Alkaline Trio. In 2004, Avril Lavigne released her second album Under My Skin, which is considered one of the works that anticipated the emotional intensity and theatrical aesthetics of emo pop in the mainstream.

As the genre coalesced, the record label Fueled by Ramen became a center of the movement, releasing platinum selling albums from bands like Fall Out Boy, Panic! at the Disco and Paramore. Two main regional scenes developed in Florida, pioneered by label Fueled by Ramen, and in the Midwest, promoted by Pete Wentz of the Illinois band Fall Out Boy, which rose to the front of the style in the mid-2000s after the single "Sugar, We're Goin Down" received heavy airplay, climbing to number eight on the U.S. Billboard Hot 100. Plain White T's was another Illinois emo pop band that received major mainstream success. Their album Every Second Counts (2006) reached number 10 on the Billboard 200 and featured their number one single "Hey There Delilah". New Jersey band My Chemical Romance was the most prominent emo pop act during the 2000s. MCR's albums Three Cheers for Sweet Revenge (2004) and The Black Parade (2006) both sold more than 3 million copies in the US alone. The latter of the albums debuted at number 2 on the Billboard 200. The album's lead single "Welcome to the Black Parade" topped the US Alternative Songs chart and reached number 9 on the Billboard hot 100. Taking Back Sunday's third album Louder Now (2006) debuted at number 2 on the Billboard 200. Hawthorne Heights's sophomore album If Only You Were Lonely (2006) reached number 3 on the Billboard 200, achieving mainstream success outside of the hardcore punk scene unlike some of their contemporaries.

We the Kings released their debut self-titled studio album, which had an emo pop sound. The album’s lead single "Check Yes Juliet" was certified triple platinum in the United States. The emo pop band Metro Station fused emo aesthetics with pop music and electronic music on their 2007 self-titled album. The band's single "Shake It" reached number 10 on the Billboard Hot 100 charts. Also in 2008, You Me at Six released their debut album Take Off Your Colours, which had been described by AllMusic's Jon O'Brien as "follow[ing] the "emo-pop for dummies"' handbook word-for-word." The album would later be certified gold in the UK. In 2009 All Time Low released their third studio album Nothing Personal which debuted at number 4 on the Billboard 200. AllMusic states that the album "helped make All Time Low one of the top emo-pop acts in the business".

=== Decline in popularity (2010s) ===
Since the early 2010s, emo pop has seen a decrease in mainstream success. While a few 2000s emo pop bands remain popular, some of them have ventured on to different sounds and aesthetics outside of the genre. Emo pop bands Thursday, The Academy Is..., Good Charlotte, Hey Monday, Forever the Sickest Kids and My Chemical Romance disbanded or went on hiatus in the early 2010s. Panic! at the Disco's 2013 album Too Weird to Live, Too Rare to Die! abandoned their emo pop sound, which was heard primarily on their debut album A Fever You Can't Sweat Out. The former album contained characteristics and influences from hip hop music, new wave music, electropop and synthpop. Fall Out Boy went on hiatus from 2009 to 2013 but returned with a new sound on their album Save Rock and Roll. The album has characteristics of pop music, alternative rock, and pop rock. Paramore ventured away from their emo pop sound with their self-titled album (2013) which contains influences of power pop, pop rock and new wave. Despite the genre’s decrease in popularity, a number of emo pop bands garnered underground popularity in the 2010s, including Sorority Noise, Real Friends, Boston Manor and Moose Blood.

== See also ==
- List of emo pop bands
- List of emo pop albums
