= The Travoltas =

Dutch pop punk band

The Travoltas are a Dutch pop punk band from the Netherlands. With a sound that combines an energetic mix of the Beach Boys and the Ramones, the band is often referred to as 'The Beach Boys of punk rock'.

== History ==
=== Early years: 1990–1996 ===
The Travoltas formed in 1990, with founding members Perry Leenhouts, Vincent Koreman, and Stephan LaHaye joining forces after the end of the Dutch punkrock band Kriezus (“Crisis”). With a sound that combines an energetic mix of the Beach Boys and the Ramones, and a dash of the Cars, The Travoltas rolific sport a list of albums, compilations, EPs, singles, and videos to their credit. With Erik van Vugt replacing LaHaye in 1993, the band released their EP debut, “Kill! Kill! Kill! Sex! Sex! Sex!” in early 1996.

=== Touring and breakthrough: 1997–2000 ===
After recruiting Martijn Smits as their new drummer (with Leenhouts now focusing on lead vocals), the band released the fast-paced “Baja California” in early 1997. Later that summer the band performed at Dynamo Open Air and toured extensively throughout Europe, opening for Marky Ramone and The Intruders. Later that year, Marky Ramone invited the band to record in Brooklyn, New York, and offered to produce Modern World (1998), which established the band's signature sound that would form the foundation for many releases to come. With a new drummer (Robert van Lieshout) and a second guitarist (Jasper van den Dobbelsteen), the band traveled to Austin, Texas, the following year to perform at the South by Southwest Festival.

With van Lieshout replaced by Wouter Verhulst, the group signed with Dutch major label CNR/Arcade to release Teenbeat (2000), and hit the Dutch charts for the first time with the album's first single and video "You Got What I Need". Keyboard player Jochem "Skokie" Weemaes was recruited to complement the surf punk sound with infectious layers of Hammond organ, piano, and vintage synths. That summer, the band performed at major festivals such as Lowlands (Netherlands), Groezrock (Belgium), and the NRJ and Great Lakes festivals in Sweden. After an extensive club tour in support of the album, van den Dobbelsteen departed the band to focus on other endeavours.

=== Experimentation and Tribute: 2001 ===
Shortly after signing with Roadrunner Records, the band traveled to Los Angeles to record Club Nouveau (2001). A departure from their signature surf punk sound, The Travoltas experimented with sampled beats and synths, with a strong focus on atmospheric vocal harmonies, showcasing the group's songwriting and producing skills at multiple levels. Aside from a four-month club tour following the release of the record, the band performed 10 back-to-back sold-out shows as a tribute to the Beach Boys.

=== Back to the Roots and America: 2002–2003 ===
Even though van Vugt left the group for a two-year hiatus (with Daan van Hooff replacing him on bass guitar), 2002 proved to be a busy and successful year for The Travoltas: after releasing the poppunk classic Endless Summer, the band toured extensively throughout the US, including performances at the Warped Tour festivals. The compilation Step on the Gas, which included previously unreleased tracks, was released later that year followed by a four-month back-to-back European tour. In early 2003, in another tribute to The Beach Boys, the band recorded and released the live acoustic album A Travoltas Party!, inspired by the 1965 Beach Boys classic Party!. Shortly thereafter van Hooff departed the band, with van Vugt returning from his sabbatical.

=== Japan and the End: 2004–2006 ===
After the departure of founding member Vincent Koreman, with Crustacean guitarist Micky Meeuwissen taking over six string duties, The Travoltas released The High School Reunion (2004), a synth-heavy concept album and tribute to 1980s high school movies and their original soundtracks. In 2005 the group fulfilled its long-held dream of touring in Japan, performing shows in Tokyo, Osaka, and Fujisawa. Sixteen years of touring and releasing records had taken its toll on the band members, and when personal priorities started to shift, The Travoltas officially decided to call it a day in 2006, playing a farewell show on November 18, in Madrid, Spain.

=== The Travoltas are back: 2014–present ===
Breaking eight years of silence, in 2014 the band released the four-track EP The Longest Wait, followed by three sold-out reunion shows in the Netherlands, that included founding member Vincent Koreman with appearances by former band members van den Dobbelsteen and van Hooff. Even though band members had spread out over two continents (and with van Hooff rejoining permanently as rhythm guitarist), the group got together in early 2016 to record Until We Hit The Shore. The 10-track album was recorded at Verhulst's Amsterdam-based studio Van Sonic, and mixed by Leenhouts over the summer and fall in Chicago, Illinois. The record was released in 2017.

In 2020 the band announced Tim van Doorn (Clueless, St. Plaster) had replaced Weemaes behind the keys, completing the current line up of Leenhouts (vocals), Meeuwissen (rhythm & lead guitar), Van Hooff (rhythm & lead guitar), van Vugt (bass), and Verhulst (drums). In June 2021 the band released the 4 track EP "Back To The City" on White Russian Records, featuring the singles "Escape The Pressure" and "Nightcrawler".

In 2022, the Travoltas joined Baltimore, Maryland punk band Huntingtons in creating a split album. The album features one new original song from each band, two covers each of the other band, and one cover each of a classic 1950s American rock and roll song. The album was titled "Rock 'N' Roll Universal International Problem", addressing that bands are from different continents, and numerous difficulties in getting the record released.

== Discography ==
=== Studio albums ===
- Baja California (1997)
- Modern World (1998)
- Teenbeat (2000)
- Club Nouveau (2001)
- Endless Summer (2002)
- Travolta's Party (2003)
- The High School Reunion (2004)
- Until We Hit the Shore (2017)

=== EPs ===
- Kill! Kill! Kill! Sex! Sex! Sex! EP (1996)
- The Longest Wait EP (2014)
- Back to the City EP (2021)
- Acoustic Sessions Volume I

=== Splits ===
- Rock 'N' Roll Universal International Problem (2022)

=== Compilations ===
- From the Secret Vaults of Weissmuller (2000)
- Step on the Gas... and Don't Look Back! (2002)
- The Singles Collection (2002)

=== Singles ===
- "Waimea" (1997)
- "I Want to Believe" (1998)
- "C'mon Rock City" (1999)
- "You Got What I Need" (2000)
- "Pray for Sun" (2000)
- "Do It Again" (2001)
- "Sugar Ride" (2001)
- "All We Really Want (Is Rock 'n Roll)" (2004)
- "Ain't That Enough" (2017)
- "Great Expectations" (2017)
- "Find You There" (2020)
- "Escape the Pressure" (2021)
- "Nightcrawler" (2021)
- "It's OK" (2023)
- "Too Much Ain't Enough" (2025)

=== Videos ===
- You Got What I Need (2000)
- Pray for Sun (2000)
- Do It Again (2001)
- Sugar Ride (2001)
- All We Really Want (Is Rock ‘n Roll) (2004)
- Ain't That Enough (2017)
- Great Expectations (2017)
- Escape the Pressure (lyric video) (2021)
- Nightcrawler (lyric video) (2021)

== Members ==
Current

- Perry Leenhouts – lead vocals
- Erik van Vugt – bass, backing vocals
- Michel "Micky" Meeuwissen – lead and rhythm guitars
- Daan van Hooff – rhythm and acoustic guitars
- Tim van Doorn – keyboards, backing vocals
- Wouter "Woody" Verhulst – drums

Former

- Vincent Koreman – guitars (1990–2003, 2014)
- Jochem "Skokie" Weemaes – keyboards, backing vocals (2000–2006, 2014–2020)
- Jasper van den Dobbelsteen – guitars (1997–2000)
- Robert van Lieshout – drums (1997–1999)
- Martijn Smits – drums (1996–1997)
- Joris van Iersel – drums (1996)
- Robin van Laarhoven – guitars (1994–1995)
- Stephan LaHaye – guitars (1990–1991)
- Danny LaHaye – bass (1991)
