= Sleep On It (band) =

American pop-punk band (2012–2020)

Sleep on It
- Origin: Chicago, Illinois, United States
- Genre: Pop punk
- Years active: 2012–2020
- Label: Equal Vision Records
- Past members: Zech Pluister; TJ Horansky; Jake Marquis; Luka Fischman; John Cass; AJ Khah
- Website: www.sleeponitband.com

Sleep on It was a band from Chicago, Illinois, formed in 2012. The band consisted of lead vocalist Zechariah Pluister, lead guitarist, backing vocalist Theodore Horansky, rhythm guitarist, backing vocalist Jacob Marquis, bassist AJ Khah and drummer Luka Fischman. They released two studio albums and three EPs before ending the band on September 4, 2020.

== Career ==
Sleep on It formed in 2012 in Logan Square, a community area of Chicago. The group originally consisted of lead guitarist TJ Horansky, secondary guitarist Jake Marquis, bass guitarist AJ Khah, drummer Luka Fischman, and lead vocalist John Cass. In 2013, the band wrote and recorded their debut EP, Everything, All at Once, with producer Paul Leavitt at Gravity Studios in downtown Chicago. The EP was independently released on February 11, 2014.

The band released the single "Bright" on May 23, 2015, as an exclusive premiere on Alternative Press. In an interview with New Noise Magazine, TJ Horansky spoke about the meaning behind "Bright", stating:

“Bright” is about learning to recognize the things and people in your life that really matter and to not take them for granted. I think a lot of people make that mistake along that way, but it’s important to grow from those mistakes. We chose “Bright” as the first single because we like the feeling of nostalgia from the lyrics juxtaposed with the summertime vibe of the music.

The group recorded their second EP, Safe Again, at Valencia Studios in Baltimore, Maryland, in early 2015 with Paul Leavitt returning as producer. Leavitt has recorded with other pop punk bands such as All Time Low and Have Mercy. The six-track EP was independently released on June 18, 2015. After touring in support of the release of the EP, the group announced that lead vocalist John Cass had departed from the band on November 5, 2015. The band continued to write and recorded new material in early 2016 for a new album.

On March 8, 2016, Sleep on It announced that they had recruited a new lead vocalist, former singer for Bonfires, Zech Pluister, and released the single and music video for "Burning at Both Ends". On August 25, 2015, the group formally announced its signing with Equal Vision Records, premiering the single "Unspoken", and announcing their third EP, Lost Along the Way. The band wrote and recorded the EP with producer Seth Henderson and State Champs lead vocalist Derek DiScanio and was later released on October 21, 2016.

The band released their debut studio album, Overexposed, on November 3, 2017.

The band's original bassist, AJ Khah left the band in February 2019 to focus on other projects.

The band released their second studio album, Pride and Disaster, on September 13, 2019.

== Discography ==
Studio albums

Title
Album details
Overexposed
- Released: November 3, 2017
- Genres: Pop-punk
- Length: 41:00
- Labels: Equal Vision
- Producers: Derek DiScanio and Seth Henderson
Track listing
1. A New Way Home - 3:20
2. Window - 3:12
3. Distant - 3:03
4. Hope - 2:51
5. Always Crashing the Same Car - 2:54
6. Photobooth - 3:52
7. What We Stay Alive For - 3:21
8. Fireworks (featuring Derek DiScanio) - 3:41
9. Leave the Light On - 3:06
10. A Brighter Shade of Blue - 4:14
11. Overexposed - 3:38
12. Autumn (I Wish I Was Better) - 3:48
Pride and Disaster
- Released: September 13, 2019
- Genres: Pop-punk
- Length: 32:28
- Labels: Equal Vision
- Producers: Mike Green, Kyle Black

No.	Title	Length
1.	"Racing Towards a Red Light"	2:58
2.	"Hold Your Breath"	3:05
3.	"Babe Ruth"	3:41
4.	"Under the Moment"	3:17
5.	"Fix the Dark"	3:11
6.	"After Tonight"	2:47
7.	"Take Me Back"	3:05
8.	"The Cycle of Always Leaving"	3:10
9.	"Logan Square"	2:57
10.	"Lost & Found"	4:07
Total length:		32:28

Extended plays

- Everything, All at Once (2014)
- Safe Again (2015)
- Lost Along the Way (Equal Vision, 2016)

Singles

- "Bright" (2015)
- "Burning at Both Ends" (2016)
- "Unspoken" (2016)
- "See You Around" (2016)
- "Distant (2017)
- "Window" (2017)
- "Fireworks" (featuring Derek DiScanio) (2017)
- "Disconnected" (2018)
- "Under the Moment" (2019)
- "Hold Your Breath" (2019)
- "After Tonight" (2019)

== Members ==
Former members

- Zech Pluister – lead vocals (2016–2020)
- Theodore Joseph Horansky – lead guitar, backing vocals (2012–2020)
- Jacob William Farquhar-Marquis – rhythm guitar, backing vocals (2012–2020)
- Luka Alexander Fischman – drums, percussion (2012–2020)
- John Cass – vocals (2012–2015)
- Zach Hir – bass guitar (touring member 2019–2020)
- AJ Khah – bass guitar (2012–2019)
