= Lucky 7 (band) =

- Origin: San Diego, California, United States
- Genres: Pop punk
- Years active: 1997–2003
- Labels: Shock Records, Omega Records

Lucky 7 was an American pop punk band from San Diego, California. They formed in 1997 and the next year independently released their first record, titled Miss Fortune. After touring with bands such as New Found Glory, Something Corporate, Pink, and Good Charlotte and receiving internet notice created by their high download rate at MP3.com, Lucky 7 signed with Shock Records/Omega Records, where they released their self-titled label-debut in 2002. The group disbanded in 2003.

Shortly after, Allen Colaneri joined Lances Hero, and ItalianJapanese which later broke up. He owns/operates the Blonde Bar in San Diego. Robert Garbowski plays drums in a band called Sweettooth. Jared Hren plays in the LA based drum group Street Drum Corps, a "Stomp-like" percussion group. Hren also plays drums in the US lineup of Guana Batz. Steven Press moved to Colorado and is employed as a law enforcement officer in the Denver area.

== Members ==
- Allen Colaneri - vocals/guitar
- Darin Brookner - guitar
- Steven Press - bass, backing vocals
- Robert Garbowski - drums
- Aaron Crossland (1998–1999) - bass, backing vocals
- Jared Hren (2002–2003) - drums

== Discography ==
Date of Release	Title	Label	
1998	Lucky7 (Demo)	Self Released	
1999	Miss Fortune	N/A	
2001	Be The One (EP)	Australia Release	Omega Records
2002	Be The One (Single)	Australia Release	Shock/Omega Records
2002	Lucky7	Omega Records	

=== Music Videos ===
- "California Girl"
- "Be The One"

== Awards ==
Date	Award Titled	Presenter
1999	Best Rock Band	San Diego Magazine
1999	Top Internet Band	CNN World Beat
1999	Best Alternative Band	MP3.com
2001	Top 5 Internet Band	Yahoo Internet Life
2001	Best Rock Band	San Diego Magazine
