= Head Injuries (band) =

American pop punk band

- Origin: Fort Collins, Colorado
- Genres: Pop punk
- Years active: 2012–2017
- Labels: Unsigned
- Members: Jared Russell; Zack Hill; Coty Eikenberg; Nate Rodriguez
- Past members: Jer Wood; Conner Hampton
- Website: www.headinjuriesmusic.com

Head Injuries was an American pop punk band from Fort Collins, Colorado formed in 2012. The group consists of Jared Russell (lead vocals, Guitar), Zack Hill (guitar, vocals), Coty Eikenberg (bass) and Nate Rodriguez (drums).

The band formed in October 2012 and recorded the "Boogie Nights EP" with Brandon Carlisle of Teenage Bottlerocket that same month. In 2012 the band headed out on "The Mission To Del Taco Tour". And later that year, the group recorded its debut self-titled album at Black in Bluhm Studio, in Denver, Colorado; the album was released in January 2013. In July 2013 the band supported its debut album on "The Mission To Get Buck Tour". The group recorded its next album, "Bail", at The Blasting Room, in Fort Collins, Colorado with Andrew Berlin and Bill Stevenson.

== History ==
The band formed in October 2011 and recorded its debut release titled "Boogie Nights EP" the same month with Brandon Carlisle of Teenage Bottlerocket. The group embarked on its first tour, "The Mission To Del Taco Tour", in 2012. Later the same year the band recorded its debut self- titled album.

== Band members ==
Current members

- Jared Russell – Lead vocals, guitar (2012–present),
- Zack Hill – guitar, vocals (2012–present)
- Coty Eikenberg – bass (2014–present)
- Nate Rodriguez – drums (2015–present)

== Tours ==
=== 2012 ===
- The Mission To Del Taco

=== 2013 ===
- The Mission To Get Buck Tour

=== 2014 ===
- Jägermeistour

=== 2015 ===
- Bail Tour
- Head Injuries Goes West

== Discography ==
=== EPs ===
- Boogie Nights EP (2011, Self-released)
- One Night Stand (2014, Self-released)

=== Studio albums ===
- Head Injuries (2013, Self-released)
- Bail (2015, Self-released)

=== Music videos ===
- Greatest Felony (2013)
