= Light Years (band) =

American pop punk band

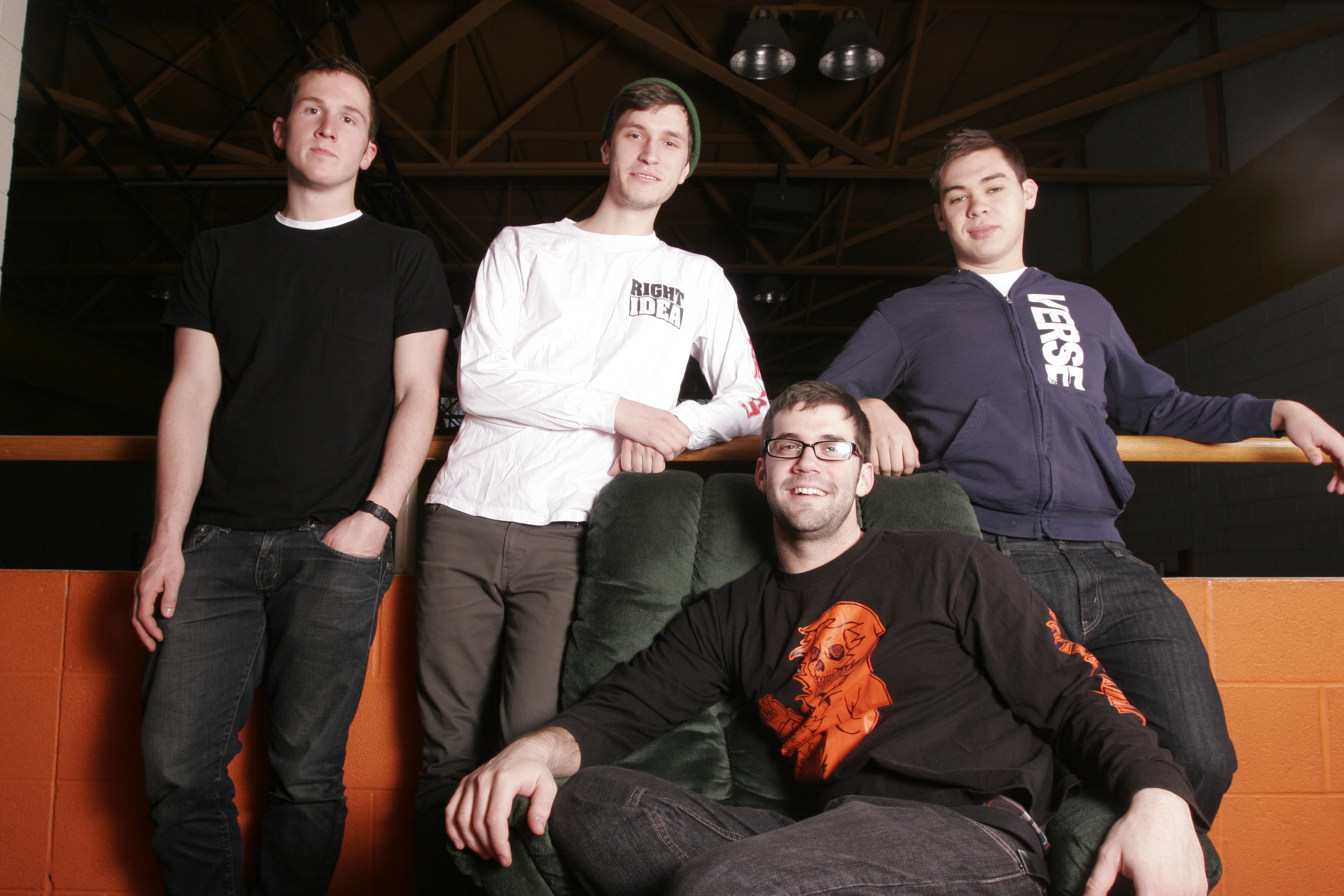
- Light Years in 2011

Background information
- Origin: Cleveland, Ohio
- Genre: Pop punk
- Years active: 2009–present
- Labels: Escapist; Paper + Plastick; Animal Style; Rude
- Members: Pat Kennedy; Andrew Foerst; Tommy Englert; Kent Sliney
- Website: lightyearsoh.bandcamp.com

Light Years are an American pop punk band from Kent, Ohio.

== History ==
Light Years formed in the year 2009 while vocalist Pat Kennedy worked at a Subway restaurant. Since then, they have released one full-length album and three EPs. In winter 2011–2012, the band went on a full U.S. tour with Pentimento. In February 2012, they went on a European tour with Pentimento. The band embarked on a summer tour in 2012 alongside Citizen and Turnover. In the spring of 2013, the band went on a tour with Safe. In June and July, the group went on a short US tour with Mixtapes, You Blew It! and Modern Baseball. In early 2014, the band played on The 2014 Acoustic Basement Tour, hosted by Warped Tour. Between February and April, the band went on a US tour with Neck Deep and Knuckle Puck. On March 16, the band performed at South by So What?! festival. In the summer of 2014, the band performed on the 2014 Warped Tour. The band released the Temporary EP through Animal Style in 2014.

The band signed a worldwide deal with independent label Rude Records in 2015 and finished recording their second full-length album with Will Yip, which was released in the Fall of 2015. The band supported Neck Deep and State Champs on their UK tour in February 2016. The band also supported Four Year Strong on their Spring 2016 Northeast tour along with Can't Swim. In March and April 2017, the group supported Four Year Strong again for their 10th anniversary tour for Rise or Die Trying (2007).

== Style ==
Rock Sound described Light Years' sound as "Smashing American pop-punk that prefers to hark back to the turn of the millenium instead of running with the current crowd".

== Members ==
Current members

- Pat Kennedy – vocals, guitar
- Andrew Foerst – guitar
- Tommy Englert – bass
- Kent Sliney – drums

== Discography ==
Studio albums

List of studio albums
Title	Album details
I Won't Hold This Against You	Released: June 18, 2013; Label: Paper + Plastick (PP0397); Format: CD, DL, LP
I'll See You When I See You	Released: November 13, 2015; Label: Rude (RDR 112); Format: CD, DL, LP
Afterlife	Released: November 30, 2018; Label: Rude (RDR 154); Format: CD, DL, LP

Extended plays

List of extended plays
Title	Album details
This Will Come Back to Haunt Me	Released: September 1, 2010; Label: Self-released; Format: DL
Just Between Us...	Released: March 10, 2012; Label: Escapist (ER-008); Format: DL, 7" vinyl
Parking Lots	Released: April 8, 2013; Label: Paper + Plastick; Format: DL
Trying to Be...	Released: October 23, 2013; Label: Paper + Plastick; Format: DL
Acoustics	Released: June 19, 2014; Label: Paper + Plastick; Format: DL
Temporary	Released: September 9, 2014; Label: Animal Style (ASR-044); Format: CD, DL, 12" vinyl
Lite Years	Released: September 9, 2016; Label: Rude; Format: DL
