= I Call Fives =

American pop punk band

- Origin: Washington Township, New Jersey
- Genres: Pop punk
- Years active: 2006–2014, 2016, 2020–present
- Labels: Pure Noise, Smartpunk
- Members: Jeff Todd; Drew Conte; Chris McClelland; Mike Joffe
- Past members: Michael Gavarone; James Corbi; Steve Cohen; Anthony Plata; Christian Mullen

I Call Fives is an American pop-punk band from Washington Township, New Jersey. Since their formation in 2006, the band have released 5 EP's and 1 self-titled full length in July 2012 through Pure Noise Records. The band was previously signed to No Sleep Records. The band was a part of the Vans Warped Tour in 2012 and has played shows in the United States, Canada, England, Ireland, Scotland, and Australia. Their debut full length premiered at No. 13 on Billboard Charts Top Heatseekers. In 2014, the band performed at Australia's annual music festival, Soundwave (Australian music festival).

== Band members ==
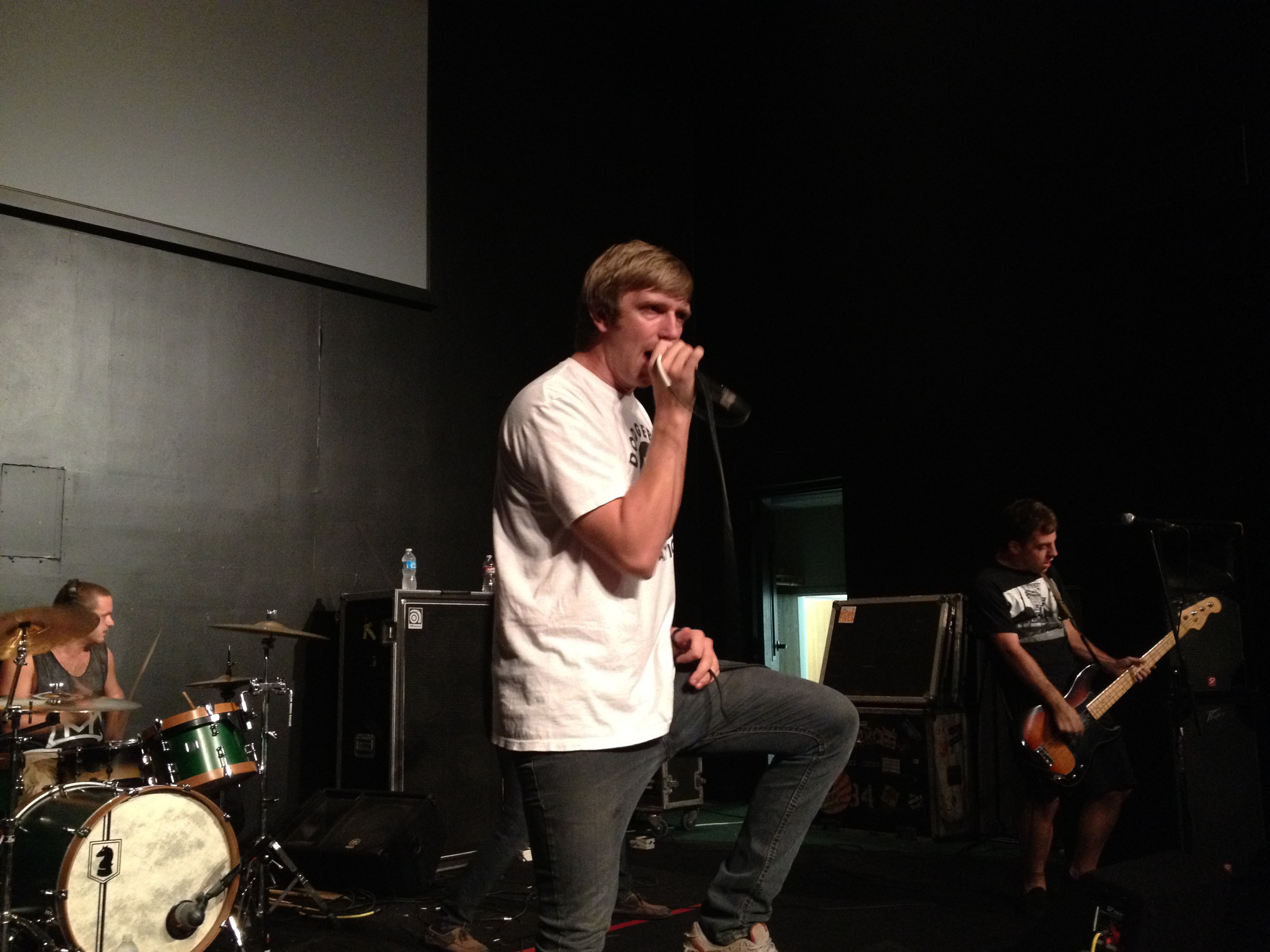
I Call Fives performing in Memphis, TN, 2012

Final Lineup

- Jeff Todd – vocals (2009–present)
- Drew Conte – bass guitar, vocals (2006–present)
- Chris McClelland – guitar (2010–2014)
- Mike Joffe – guitar (2011–present)

Past Members

- James Corbi – vocals (2006–2009)
- Steve Cohen – drums (2010, 2012)
- Michael Gavarone – guitar (2006–2011)
- Anthony Plata – guitar (2006–2010)
- Christian Mullen – drums (2007, 2009–2010, 2011)

== Discography ==
EP's

- 2008: First Things First
- 2010: Bad Advice
- 2010: Gives Bad Advice (Acoustic EP)
- 2012: Someone That's Not You
- 2023: Not For Everyone

Split 7"

- 2011: I Call Fives/Rust Belt Lights

Studio Albums

- 2012: I Call Fives

Compilations

- 2012: Warped Tour 2012 Tour Compilation
  - "Backup Plan"

== Music videos ==
- "Late Nights" (2012)
