= The Fades (band) =

English indie rock band

- Origin: London, England
- Genres: Indie rock, punk
- Years active: 2002–present
- Labels: Dirrty Records; Genepool Records; Cranky Girl Records
- Members: Dave Lightfoot; James Lightfoot; Jonny Barnard; Alastair Thorpe
- Past members: Graham Best; Dan Wheeldon; Jonny Juviler
- Website: Thefades.net

The Fades are an English indie rock band from London, England, comprising Dave Lightfoot on guitar and vocals, James Lightfoot on bass, Jonathan "Jonny" Barnard on guitar and Alastair "Flash" Thorpe on drums.

== History ==
The Fades were formed 2000 by Richmond-based brothers James and Dave Lightfoot as Petrol Bomb, later Molotov Cocktail. They became The Fades when guitarist Jonny Barnard joined the band in early 2002 after a Molotov Cocktail demo was featured on Steve Lamacq's show on BBC Radio 1. The band's first releases were the singles "You Say" and "Life Support" in 2003. Both songs have been played by Steve Lamacq and Zane Lowe. "You Say" was playlisted at XFM and a live session was recorded with Claire Sturgess.

The Fades released the EP Social Misfits in 2004 with eight songs and they were touring with Art Brut. The next single "Caca" was supported by Marc Riley, he played it on Mint and invited the band April 2006 to play a session for Rocket Science. In early summer 2006 drummer Graham Best left the band. He was replaced by Alastair "Flash" Thorpe. With the new drummer they went on tour in Ireland and Northern Ireland in June, which include a session for BBC Radio Foyle.

In April 2007 The Fades released their self-titled debut album at Dirrty Records. In summer 2007 music from the album was used for a soundtrack on a motocross and mountain biking DVD called Inevitable Descent which was released in Australia. Also two songs of the album were featured in Life, the NBC series. "Life Support" in the episode "Did You Feel That?" and "Rearrange" in the episode "Mirror Ball".

They have a growing fan base in Italy and Germany. Tracks by the album were played among others by Paul Baskerville on NDR Nachtclub at Norddeutscher Rundfunk, Freies Sender Kombinat (FSK) and Byte FM. At Christmas 2007 FSK played the first album in full length.

The Fades started recording new material in October 2007. In November they played at an independent festival in Italy, followed by an Italy Tour in May/June 2008. An EP called "The Split" (a Split EP with GST Cardinals) was released in November 2008 on the New York based label Cranky Girl Records.

In 2010 the second album Muvva, I'm A Drunk, was recorded live in a studio and released on Cranky Girl Records. After a temporary break Flash joined the band again. In November 2010, The Fades toured in the United States with several gigs in New York. In January 2011, they started to record a new album. Ragnarok was released in 2012.

== Discography ==
=== Singles ===
- "You Say/1995", 2003, Genepool Records
- "Life Support/Blade/Another Song About Motorbikes", 2003, Genepool Records
- "Caca/Fruit Machine", 2006, Genepool Records

=== EPs ===
- Social Misfits, 2004, Genepool Records
- The Split, 2008, Cranky Girl Records

=== Compilation tracks ===
- "Life Support", 2003, V.A. - XRAY CD No. 08
- "1995", 2005, V.A. - Best of Barfly Unsigned: Spring/Summer Collection
- "Life Support", 2005, V.A. - Buffalo Bar Presents Sound Issues Volume 1

=== Albums ===
- The Fades, 2007, Dirrty Records
- Muvva, I'm A Drunk, 2010, Cranky Girl Records
- Ragnarok, 2012, Genepool Records

=== Downloads ===
- "Hurdy Gurdy Guy", 2007
