= Student Rick =

American band

- Origin: South Bend, Indiana
- Genres: Pop punk, emo
- Years active: 1998–2002
- Labels: Victory, Vandalus
- Members: Adam Reiter; Brett Jones; Jason Pavilanis; Zach Davis
- Past members: Bryce Dudka; Allan Adams

Student Rick was an emo band from South Bend, Indiana that consisted of Adam Reiter (guitar/vocals), Brett Jones (guitar/vocals), Jason Pavilanis (bass), and Zach Davis (drums). They were most known for their song "Falling for You" from the Victory Records release Soundtrack for a Generation, which was featured in the video games Aggressive Inline and Amped 2. "Falling for You" is commonly a victim of misattribution on file sharing networks, frequently displayed as being written by Taking Back Sunday, Simple Plan, Something Corporate, or The Starting Line. The band broke up in November 2002.

== History ==
=== Early years (1998–2000) ===
Adam Reiter met Brett Jones in school with a desire to form a band. They began to write songs together after learning that they both had written songs on their own. They needed a bass guitarist and drummer, and soon recruited early members Allan Adams and Bryce Dudka. They recorded their 6 track demo tape in 2000. Before long, Adams and Dudka had left the band and members. Jones and Reiter in turn met Jason Pavilanis and Zach Davis who were looking to join a band. Soon after they joined the band with Pavilanis on bass and Davis on drums.

=== Demos, EP and Soundtrack for a Generation (2001) ===
After Student Rick got a steady line-up, they began to play shows and recorded the song "October Skies" in which they sent to many record companies. This took the attention of a Victory Records worker who spread it around the label. The band then recorded the Winter 2001 EP to give out on their tour. Vandalus Records had re-released Winter 2001 EP as Every Child Needs A Hero EP with an added bonus video for the song "10:00" mistakenly titled "Anniversary" which was another Student Rick song from the early demo. Student Rick signed to Victory Records in March 2001; the following month, the band played a few US shows with Showoff as part of the Back to School from Spring Break Midwest Tour. In June and July, the band recorded their debut album at The Blasting Room in Fort Collins, Colorado, with Bill Stevenson and Jason Livermore. In August and September, the band toured the US with Showoff and Element 101. They re-recorded the 5 songs from the EP along with 8 new and 1 hidden track for their debut album Soundtrack for a Generation, which was released on October 9, 2001. In February and March 2002, the band joined the Victory Records Tour alongside labelmates Grade, Reach the Sky, and Catch 22. On April 18, 2002, bassist Jason Pavilanis left the band. In May 2002, the band supported River City High on their headlining US tour.

=== Warped Tour and break-up (2002) ===
After the release of the album, they played the 2002 Vans Warped Tour with fellow Victory Records labelmates. Pavilanis had left the band due to differences and was replaced with the band's friend Nate on bass. Davis broke his arm in a bowling accident that year and couldn't play for the rest of the tour. In turn, he left the band for personal reasons and differences. In November 2002 the band had made the decision to break up due to creative differences and the members had wanted different things out of their musical careers.

=== Reformations and current activity (2002–present) ===
In 2003, Reiter had reformed with members of Sweetheart Revolution as the band Eiffel ReV. A few demos were released in the past online, although those have since been removed. They have since disbanded. Adam, Jason, and Zach from Student Rick have reformed as Hello Vegas. Brett Jones from Student Rick was initially part of those sessions, however Brett was soon replaced by Jesse Gurtis. Hello Vegas has since disbanded in 2012. Reiter now has reformed with former Hello Vegas member Jesse Gurtis as Say Say.

== Discography ==
- Demo (2000)
- Every Child Needs A Hero (Winter Tour EP) (2001)
- Soundtrack for a Generation (2001, Victory Records)
- Aggressive Inline (2002, video game, Acclaim Entertainment) - "Falling for You", "Monday Morning"
- Punk Goes Pop - "Heaven Is A Place On Earth"
- Victory Style 5 - "Any Way You Want It" (2002, Victory Records)
