= Pop-punk =

Music genre combining punk rock and pop

- Other names: Pop punk; punk pop
- Stylistic origins: Punk rock; power pop; pop
- Cultural origins: Late 1970s, United States and United Kingdom
- Derivative forms: Emo rap; soft grunge

Subgenres
- Neon pop punk

Fusion genres
- Easycore; emo pop

Other topics
- New wave; skate punk; emo; melodic hardcore

Pop-punk (also punk pop, and alternatively spelled without the hyphen) is a rock music genre that combines elements of punk rock and pop. It is defined by its fast-paced, energetic tempos, and emphasis on classic pop songcraft, as well as adolescent and anti-suburbia themes. It is distinguished from other punk-variant genres by drawing more heavily from 1960s bands such as the Beatles, the Kinks, and the Beach Boys. The genre has evolved throughout its history, absorbing elements from new wave, college rock, ska, hip hop, emo, boy band pop and even hardcore punk and metalcore. It is sometimes considered interchangeable with power pop and skate punk.

The genre's roots are found during the late 1970s with groups such as the Ramones, the Undertones, and Buzzcocks setting its initial groundwork. 1980s punk bands like Bad Religion, Descendents and the Misfits, while not necessarily pop-punk in and of themselves, were influential to pop-punk, and it expanded in the late 1980s and early 1990s by a host of bands signed to Lookout! Records, including Screeching Weasel, the Queers, and the Mr. T Experience, becoming a foundational stage. In the mid-1990s, the genre saw a widespread popularity increase and entered the mainstream with bands like Green Day and the Offspring, and by late 1990s through early 2000s, it experienced a second wave led by Blink-182, and in their wake followed contemporary acts such as Sum 41, New Found Glory, Good Charlotte, and Avril Lavigne, while the Warped Tour played a crucial role in launching up-and-coming pop-punk artists.

Pop-punk's mainstream popularity continued in the mid-to-late 2000s, with artists such as Fall Out Boy, My Chemical Romance, and Paramore achieving high levels of commercial success with a pop-punk-influenced style dubbed emo pop. The emergence of this emo crossover style resulted in the pop-punk genre as a whole becoming largely indistinguishable from artists tagged as "emo". By the 2010s, pop-punk's mainstream popularity had waned, with rock bands and guitar-centric music becoming rare as pop radio became more dance-focused. During this period, however, a wave of underground artists defined a more raw and emotional take on the genre, namely the Story so Far, the Wonder Years and Neck Deep. In the early 2020s, a new crop of pop-punk music began experiencing a mainstream resurgence with various new acts such as Machine Gun Kelly, KennyHoopla and Yungblud.

== Definition and characteristics ==
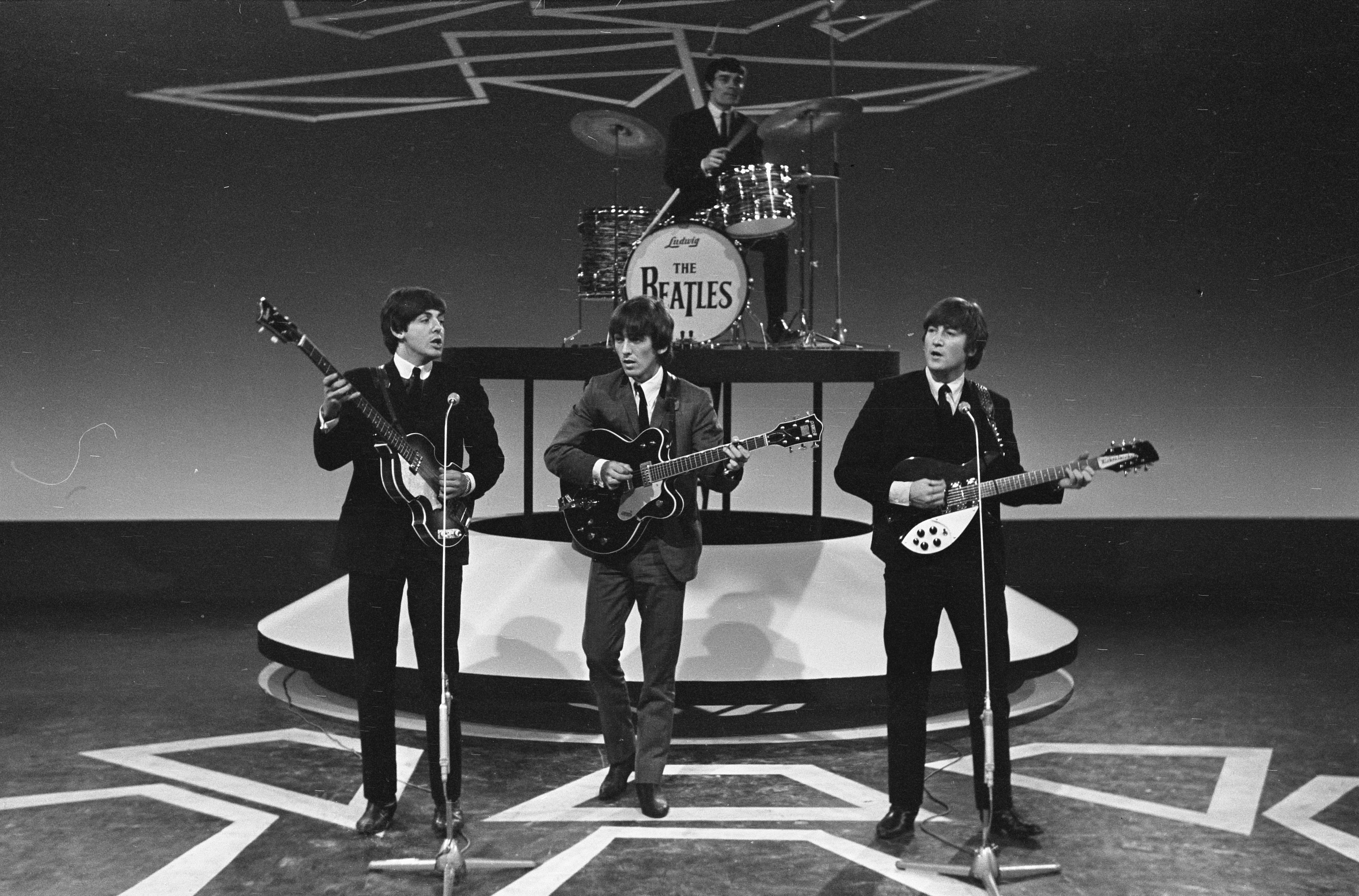
Pop-punk is distinguished from other punk-variant genres by drawing more heavily from 1960s bands such as the Beatles.

Pop-punk is variously described as a punk subgenre, a variation of punk, a form of pop music, and a genre antithetical to punk in a similar manner as post-punk. It has evolved stylistically throughout its history, absorbing elements from new wave, college rock, ska, rap, emo, and boy bands. Some variations of pop-punk are noted for their faithfulness to traditional punk rock, employing a "raw, gritty, screamy, and not necessarily radio-friendly" sound. Other variants are more polished and suitable for mainstream radio.

Writers at The A.V. Club described pop-punk as a punk subgenre that has "essentially been around as long as punk itself" with roots in the "classic pop of the Beatles, the Kinks, and the Beach Boys, often pitting sweet harmonies against bratty, rowdy riffs". According to Ryan Cooper of About.com, "pop-punk is a style that owes more to The Beatles and '60s pop than other sub-genres of punk".

There is considerable overlap between power pop and pop-punk, and the two styles are often conflated. Web publication Revolver acknowledged that, while pop-punk and power pop are often presented interchangeably, "the core concept is simple—melodic songs packaged with a punk slant". In Brian Cogan's The Encyclopedia of Punk Music and Culture (2006) pop-punk is characterized as "a catchy, faster version of power pop". AllMusic defines "punk-pop" as "a post-grunge strand of alternative rock" that combines the textures and fast tempos of punk rock with the "melodies and chord changes" of power pop. In the 1990s, there was overlap between pop-punk and skate punk. Music journalist Ben Myers wrote that the two terms were synonymous.

Rock writer Greg Shaw, who wrote extensively about power pop and took credit for codifying the genre in the 1970s, originally defined power pop itself as a hybrid style of punk and pop. Green Day frontman Billie Joe Armstrong, who described power pop as "the greatest music on Earth that no one likes", whether it's something like Cheap Trick or [another band]". opined that the pop-punk term was an oxymoron: "You're either punk or you're not." Writing in Shake Some Action: The Ultimate Guide to Power Pop (2007), actor Robbie Rist felt that much of the genre merely consisted of pop bands who "add the 'punk' moniker so the kids will think they are pissing off their parents".

Even during its formative phase in 1978, pop-punk wasn't simply a lighter, more palatable version of punk. It was just as rebellious, only it rebelled against punk itself: its nihilism, its bad-boy pose, its mockery of melody, its belittling of sentimentality, and above all, its self-seriousness. In a way, pop punk became its own kind of post-punk...

— Vice writer Jason Heller

Rolling Stone, in an article about pop-punk, wrote that the term was a retroactive label for punk bands who had "always championed great songwriting alongside their anti-authoritarian stance. And punk's focus on speed, concision and three-chord simplicity is a natural fit with pop's core values." Vice's Jason Heller described "an open respect for the tradition and craft of pop songwriting" as a key characteristic of pop-punk. Bill Lamb, also from About.com, writes that pop-punk is a variant of punk music that features "a hard and fast guitar and drums base but powered by pop melodies like much of '70s punk rock". Alter the Press! defines pop-punk as "a genre that originates from mixing punk rock with pop sensibility".

Lyrically, pop-punk often addresses adolescent themes of lust, romantic relationships, heartbreak, drugs, suburbia, and rebellion. Some pop-punk lyrics make an emphasis on jokes and humor. The New Yorker's Amanda Petrush summarized that the "rawness" of pop-punk "lies not in the music" but by conveying the "spectrum of human experience, all that longing and self-doubt".

== History ==
=== Origins (1970s–1980s) ===
The term pop punk was first used by John Rockwell in a New York Times March 1977 article to describe Tom Petty and the Heartbreakers.

Punk rock has long shared sensibilities with pop music, especially since the late 1970s. In his book Rock and Roll: A Social History (2018), author Paul Friedlander lists the following English artists as representative of the "new wave of pop punk synthesis" that occurred in the late 1970s: Elvis Costello and the Attractions, the Police, the Jam, Billy Idol, Joe Jackson, the Pretenders, UB40, Madness, the Specials, and the English Beat. Likewise, among American acts, Friedlander references Talking Heads, Blondie, the B-52s, the Motels, and Pere Ubu.

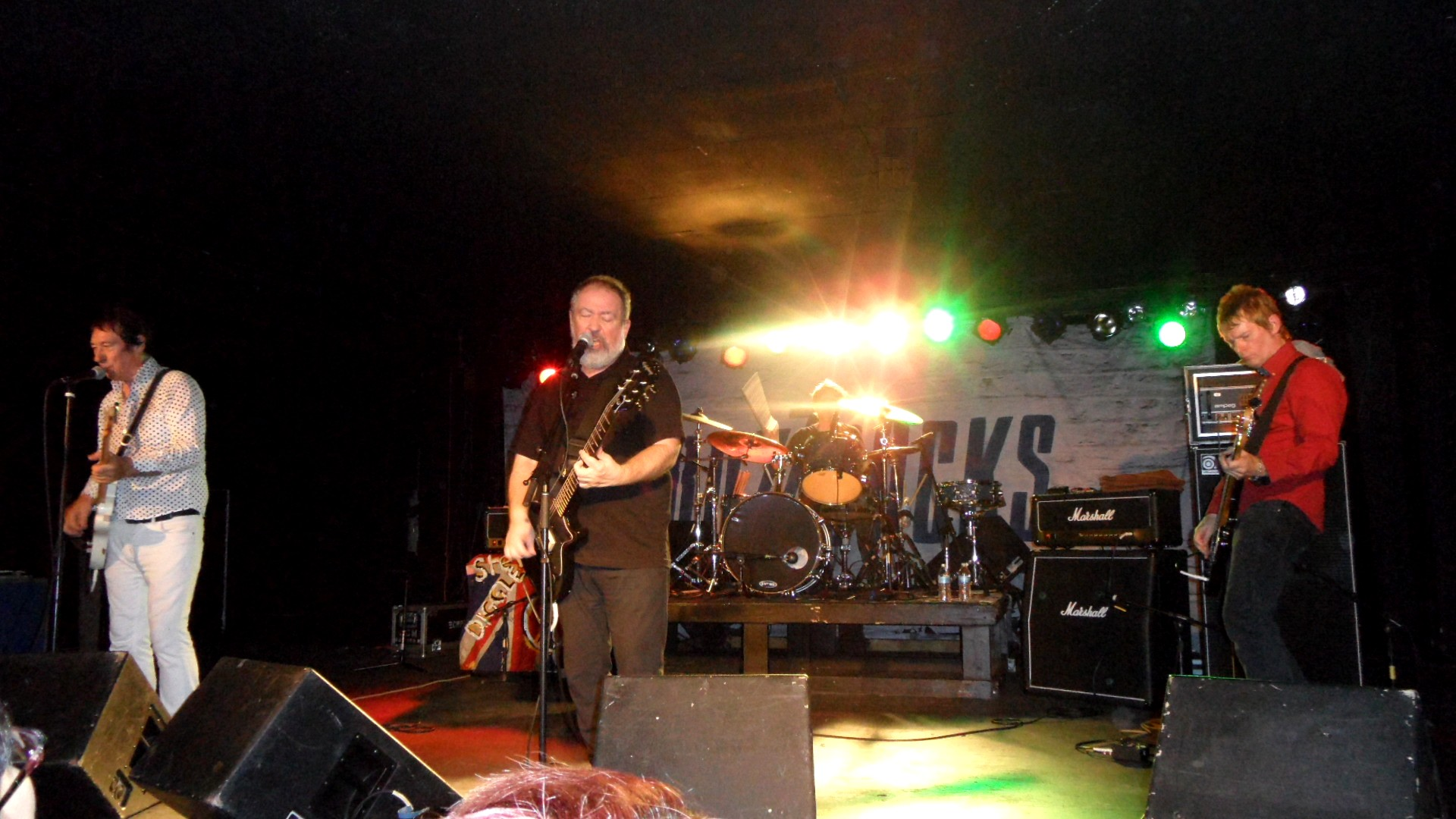
Buzzcocks are considered one of the pioneers of pop-punk.

Heller said that the Ramones crafted a blueprint for pop-punk with their 1976 debut album, but 1978 was the year that the genre "came into its own". He noted that some bands "were unmistakably pop punk bands by today's definition of the term, but in 1978, the distinction wasn't so clear. Plenty of punk groups of the era threw a token pop tune or two into their set—sometimes for ironic effect, other times earnestly." Heller also acknowledged that many "burgeoning pop punk groups in 1978 bordered on power pop, a parallel genre on the rise at the time. But power pop began earlier, and it was a more American phenomenon". Among the influential pop-punk bands of the late 1970s were the Buzzcocks. An LA Weekly writer later referred to the band's 1979 compilation album Singles Going Steady as "the blueprint for punk rock bands preferring tuneful tales of lost love and longing to rage against the machine." Cooper similarly cited the album as one of punk's most influential and added that Buzzcocks' "pop overtones [led] them to be a primary influence on today's pop punk bands.". Heller referred to the Undertones as "the most subversive band" of the genre during this period, particularly their 1978 single "Teenage Kicks", "one of the most striking and definitive pop punk classics."

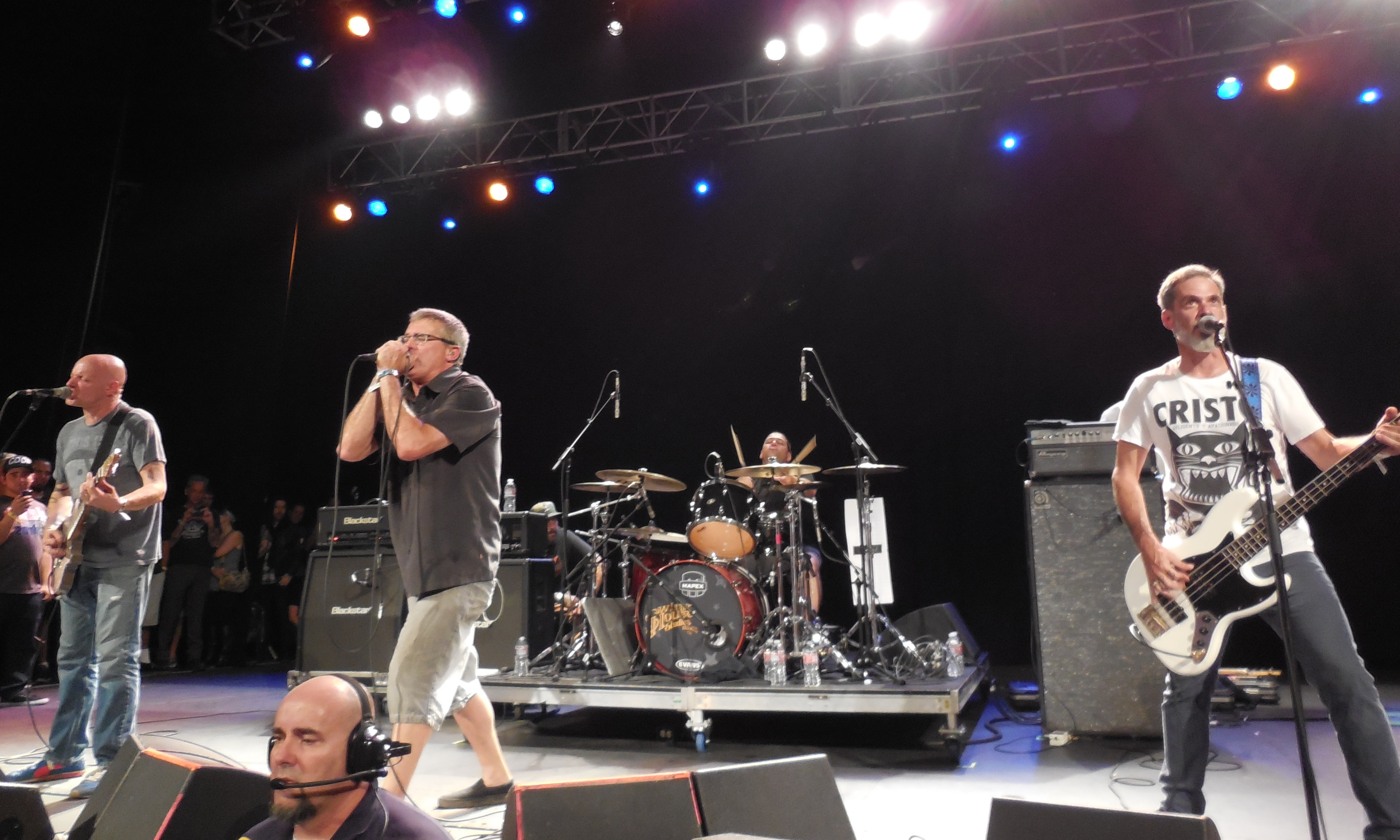
The Descendents are considered a prominent band of 1980s pop-punk.

Bad Religion, formed in 1979, helped to lay the groundwork for the pop-punk style that emerged in the 1990s. They and some of the other leading bands in Southern California's hardcore punk scene emphasized a more melodic approach than was typical of their peers. According to Myers, Bad Religion "layered their pissed off, politicized sound with the smoothest of harmonies". Myers added that another band, the Descendents, "wrote almost surfy, Beach Boys-inspired songs about girls and food and being young(ish)". Their positive yet sarcastic approach began to separate them from the more serious hardcore scene. The Descendents' 1982 debut LP Milo Goes to College provided the template for the United States' take on the more melodic strains of first wave punk. Many pop-punk bands, including Blink-182, cite the Descendents as a major influence. Descendents paved the way for future pop-punk bands with themes of hating parents, struggling to find a romantic partner, and social alienation. Horror punk band the Misfits also influenced pop-punk with their 1982 album Walk Among Us, which was a forerunner to later pop-punk music with the album's vocal harmonies and pop-inspired melodies. The Misfits' gothic image inspired later pop-punk bands like Alkaline Trio and My Chemical Romance. Marginal Man was a Washington D.C. hardcore punk band who mixed hardcore punk with melodic chord progressions and clean, melodic singing, being influenced by power pop, jangle pop and new wave music.

When bands like Green Day, The Offspring, NOFX and Rancid helped pop punk explode in 1994/1995, the mainstream called it a "punk revival" because it was the first time that punk had a real mainstream presence since the first-wave '70s bands. But as many people knew then and even more people know now, the mid '90s pop punk boom wasn't a revival of anything; it was the culmination of a sound that had been bubbling on an underground level since the early 1980s. [...] When punk's first wave started to die down and make way for the more digestible, mainstream-embraced sound of new wave, a new crop of bands took the loud, fast sounds of the Ramones and the Dead Boys in a more extreme direction: hardcore. Once hardcore bands realized they could combine the genre's speed, intensity, and simplicity with bright, catchy melodies, pop punk was born.

— Andrew Sacher, Brooklyn Vegan (July 29, 2020)

=== Underground expansion (late 1980s and early 1990s) ===
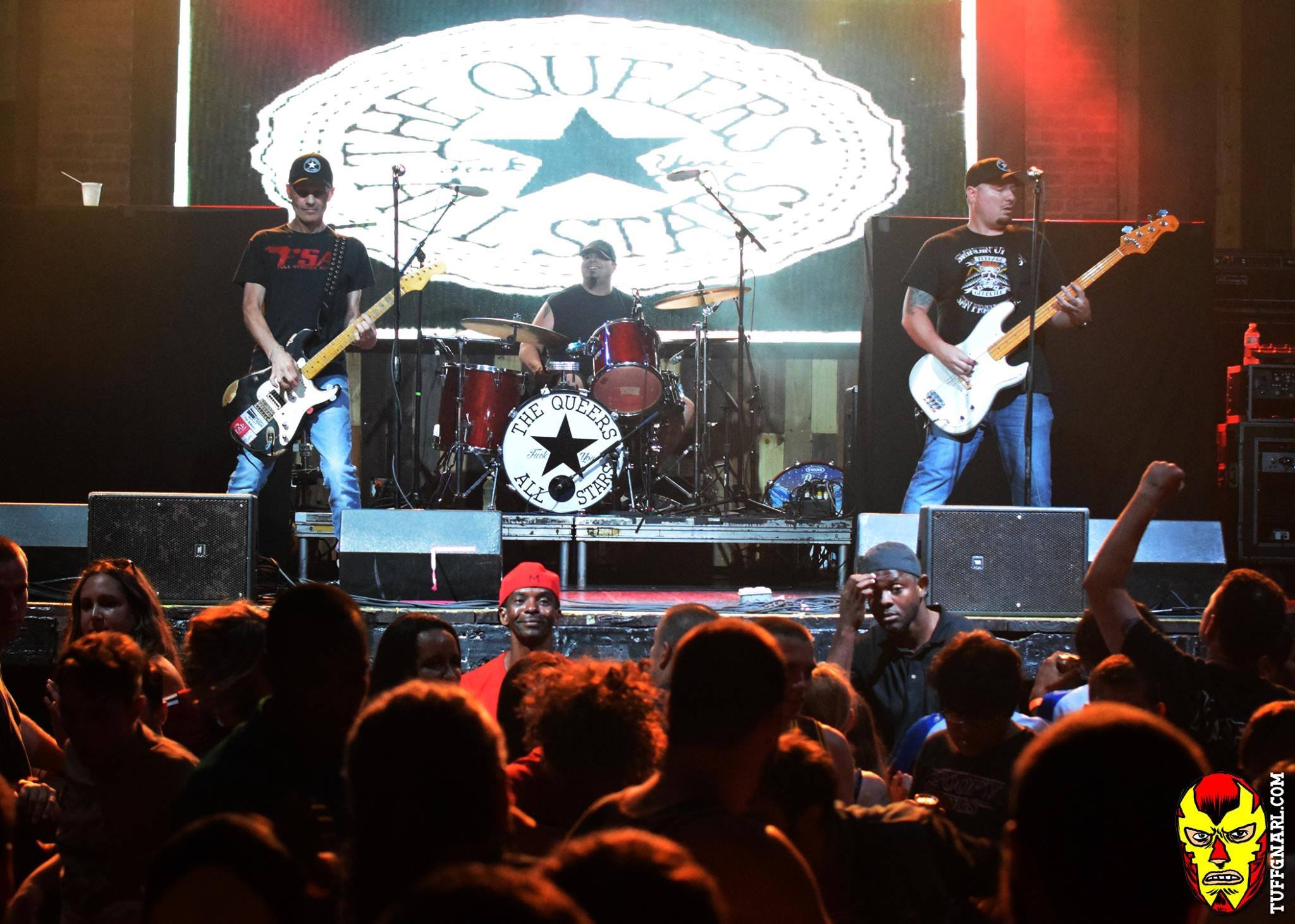
Pop-punk band The Queers

During the late 1980s and early 1990s, pop-punk bands such as Green Day, the Queers, the Mr. T Experience and Screeching Weasel emerged from the record label Lookout! Records with a sound indebted to Buzzcocks, the Ramones, and the Undertones. In August 1992, early 1990s California punk rock and pop-punk was noticed by the magazine Spin when the magazine published a story called "California Screamin'", which is about the early 1990s underground punk rock scene in California, mentioning pop-punk bands like Screeching Weasel and Green Day. Screeching Weasel's 1991 album My Brain Hurts influenced many subsequent pop-punk bands, with bands like Blink-182, Allister and Alkaline Trio citing them as an influence. Social Distortion, known for playing genres like traditional punk and cowpunk, achieved moderate success starting in the early 1990s prior to the 1994 mainstream explosion of pop punk. The band's self-titled album (1990) and Somewhere Between Heaven and Hell (1992) both eventually were certified gold in the United States.

=== Mainstream popularity (mid-1990s to 2000s) ===
==== 1994–1997: Mainstream breakthrough ====
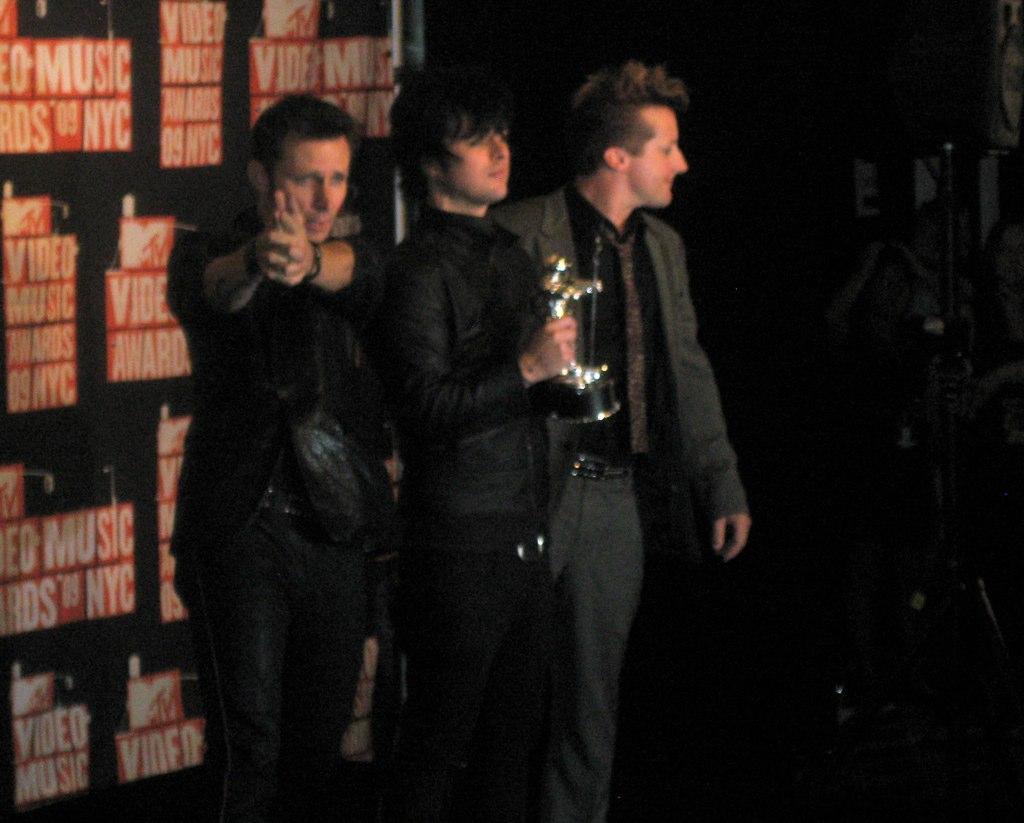
Green Day, who helped usher in the genre's mainstream success, at the 2009 MTV Video Music Awards

In the wake of Nirvana and grunge breaking through in the early 1990s, California's Green Day and Bad Religion were both signed to major labels in 1993, and by 1994, pop-punk was quickly growing in mainstream popularity, soon before grunge's popularity began to decline. Many punk rock and pop-punk bands originated from the California punk scene of the late 1980s, and several of those bands, especially Green Day and the Offspring, helped revive interest in punk rock in the 1990s. Green Day arose from the 924 Gilman Street punk scene in Berkeley, California. After building an underground following, the band signed to Reprise Records and released their major-label debut album, Dookie, in 1994. Dookie sold four million copies by the year's end and spawned several radio singles that received extensive MTV rotation, three of which peaked at number one on the Modern Rock Tracks chart. Green Day's enormous commercial success paved the way for other North American pop-punk bands in the following decade. In 1999, Dookie was certified diamond by the Recording Industry Association of America (RIAA). The Offspring also achieved mainstream success in 1994 with their album Smash being certified 6× platinum by the RIAA.

MTV and radio stations such as Los Angeles' KROQ-FM played a major role in the genre's mainstream success. The Warped Tour, started in 1995, brought punk even further into the United States mainstream. With punk rock's renewed visibility came concerns among some in the punk subculture that the music was being co-opted by the mainstream. Some punk rock fans criticized Green Day for "selling out" and rejected their music as too soft, pop-oriented and not legitimate punk rock. They argued that by signing to major labels and appearing on MTV, bands like Green Day were buying into a system that punk was created to challenge.

==== 1997–2004: Second mainstream wave ====
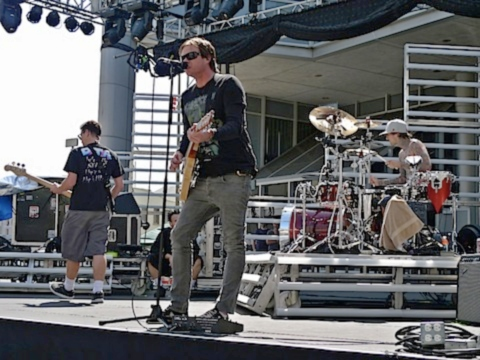
Blink-182 performing live in 2009

In 1997, Blink-182 released their breakthrough album, Dude Ranch, and the band performed at the Vans Warped Tour that year. "Dammit", the album's second single, received frequent airplay on modern rock stations, and the album was certified gold by 1998. By 1999, Blink achieved further mainstream success with Enema of the State. In the description of journalist Matt Crane, the record initiated "a new wave of pop punk". He added, "At any given time in the late '90s/early 2000s, it was not uncommon to see Blink-182 and Sum 41 on MTV. You couldn't escape it. Pop punk was in, and it became the undisputed mainstream choice." Lamb described second-wave pop-punk bands, led by Blink-182, as having "a radio friendly sheen to their music, but still maintaining much of the speed and attitude of classic punk rock". Enema of the State was certified 5× platinum by the RIAA and its song "All the Small Things" peaked at number six on the Billboard Hot 100. Sum 41's debut album All Killer No Filler was certified triple platinum in their home country of Canada. Its song "Fat Lip" peaked at number one on the US Billboard alternative airplay chart and number eight on the UK singles chart.

Around this time the genre saw the rise of the "Drive-Thru Records Era", where a number of bands that were signed to independent record labels gained mainstream attention, namely those on Drive-Thru Records. This included bands such as New Found Glory, Allister, Fenix TX, the Early November, Something Corporate, the Starting Line, Midtown, Hellogoodbye, Rx Bandits and the Movielife. A 2017 article by Upset Magazine called New Found Glory "pop punk's most consistent and influential bands for 20 years" and the Starting Line's song "Best of Me" was cited by Alternative Press as one of the most influential songs in the genre.

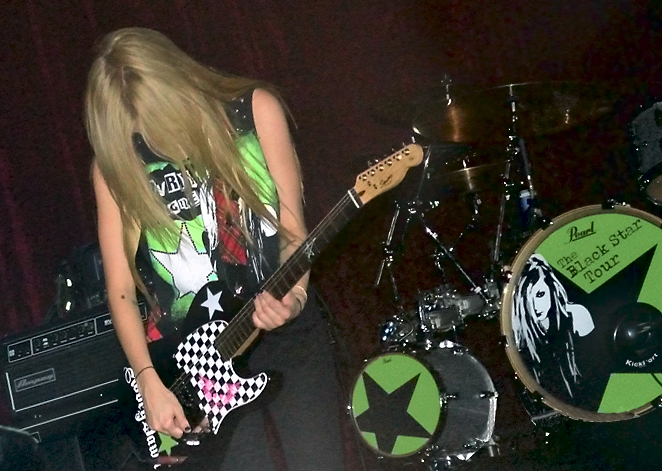
Avril Lavigne was a key pop-punk artist in the 2000s.

Avril Lavigne's 2002 album Let Go set a precedent for the success of female-fronted pop-punk acts. Journalist Nick Laugher wrote that it was "undeniable" that the record launched pop-punk into the mainstream, "blurring the lines with it and straight-up pop music, and making it more of a cultural movement than a genre." Other critics and publications noticed that because of Lavigne's punk-driven-pop anthems, she has earned the reputation as the genre's "queen". For her part, Lavigne preferred to describe her music as "heavy pop rock", rather than punk. Other pop-punk bands that achieved popularity include Good Charlotte, Simple Plan and MxPx. Good Charlotte's 2002 album The Young and the Hopeless went triple platinum. Simple Plan's 2002 debut album No Pads, No Helmets...Just Balls was certified double platinum and its 2004 follow-up Still Not Getting Any... went platinum.

In the United Kingdom, Busted and McFly gained notability through merging pop-punk musicality with boy band aesthetics. Busted's 2002 self-titled debut album was certified 4× platinum and their second album A Present for Everyone was certified 3× platinum. McFly's 2004 debut album Room on the 3rd Floor peaked at number one on the UK albums chart and was certified 2× platinum.

==== 2004–2010: Emo pop and neon pop-punk era ====
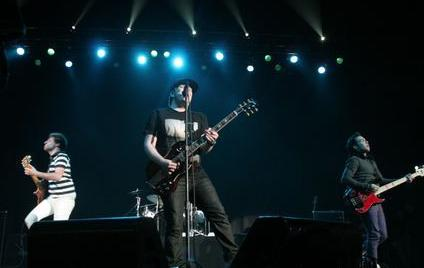
Fall Out Boy performing in 2006

As emo pop's merger of pop-punk and emo coalesced, the record label Fueled by Ramen became a center of the movement, releasing platinum selling albums from bands like Fall Out Boy, Panic! at the Disco and Paramore. Fall Out Boy's 2005 song "Sugar, We're Goin Down" received heavy airplay, climbing to number eight on the U.S. Billboard Hot 100 music charts. Plain White T's was another Illinois emo pop band that received major mainstream success. Their album Every Second Counts (2006) went number 10 on the Billboard 200 charts and featured their number one single "Hey There Delilah". New Jersey band My Chemical Romance was one of the faces of emo pop during the 2000s. MCR's albums Three Cheers for Sweet Revenge (2004) and The Black Parade (2006) each sold more than 3 million copies in the US alone. The latter of the albums debuted at number 2 on the Billboard 200 charts. The album's lead single "Welcome to the Black Parade" topped the US Alternative Songs chart and reached number 9 on the Billboard hot 100. Taking Back Sunday's third album Louder Now (2006) debuted at number 2 on the Billboard 200 charts.

According to Brooklyn Vegan's Andrew Sacher, after the success of "hugely popular" 2000s bands such as Fall Out Boy, Paramore, and My Chemical Romance, "the line between pop punk and emo look[ed] close to nonexistent." Several pop-punk bands took different musical directions in the late 2000s, with Panic! at the Disco crafting the Beatles-inspired, baroque-styled record Pretty. Odd. (2008) and Fall Out Boy experimenting with glam rock, blues rock and R&B on Folie a Deux (2008), both of which created fan confusion and backlash. Folie a Deux sold worse than their preceding albums, a representation of the backlash from their fanbase as the group experimented with a musical style differing from their established pop-punk sound.

The late-2000s also saw the pioneering of neon pop-punk, a style of pop-punk that embraced more elements of pop and electronic music than was traditional in the genre. Popular groups in the style at the time included All Time Low, the Maine, the Cab, Metro Station, Boys Like Girls, Cobra Starship and Forever the Sickest Kids. Metro Station's 2007 single "Shake It" peaked at number 10 on the Billboard Hot 100 and number 6 on the UK Singles Chart. All Time Low's 2008 single "Dear Maria, Count Me In" is certified double platinum in the United States, and their 2009 album Nothing Personal peaked at number 3 on the Billboard Digital Albums chart. The Maine's 2008 debut album Can't Stop Won't Stop peaked at number 9 on the Billboard digital albums chart. Cobra Starship's 2009 album Hot Mess reached number 4 on the Billboard 200. Boys Like Girls' 2009 second album Love Drunk peaked at number 8 on the Billboard 200 chart.

=== Decline in mainstream popularity (2010s) ===
Pop-punk lost its mainstream popularity in the early 2010s, with rock bands and guitar-centric music becoming rare on dance-focused pop radio. Some acts, such as New Found Glory, have seen concert attendance numbers decrease steadily. Devon Maloney of MTV wrote that "Pop punk and emo bands don't headline Coachella or Bonnaroo; they rarely, if ever, are even billed on mainstream festival stages," and notes that it has similarly disappeared from the press. The only magazines that featured pop-punk bands were niche publications such as Alternative Press and the occasional teen magazine, while influential pop-punk magazine AMP ceased publication in 2013. The decline in mainstream popularity for the genre, coupled with the closure of many mid-size venues associated with it, resulted in many venues and labels returning to the DIY ethic that helped spawn the punk movement.

By 2012, pop-punk bands that had achieved minimal mainstream success had seen a return to grassroots form, considered "the micro-operation style that yielded the results that caught the mainstream's attention in the first place." Chad Gilbert of New Found Glory wrote in an op-ed for Alternative Press entitled "Why Pop-Punk's Not Dead—And Why It Still Matters Today": "This isn't a dead genre, and just because there isn't a song on the radio to clarify that shouldn't matter. ... Pop-punk means something to a lot of people and to me, having success as a band in our genre is about longevity, touring a lot and staying true to your fans."

By the 2010s, many pop-punk bands had folded; "once essentially child stars, their members are now adult musicians hoping to move beyond the teen trappings that gave them careers." Fall Out Boy and Paramore, two groups that achieved mainstream success within the genre, had two number one albums—Save Rock and Roll and Paramore—side by side on the Billboard 200. Fall Out Boy along with other pop-punk bands that peaked during the mid-2000s began experimenting with the more pop side of pop punk, in order to maintain their relevancy and keep the interest of their fanbase while gaining the appeal of the newer generations that may not like their traditional sound or relate as much to the punk themes of the 1970s. Their popularity provoked conversations about the state of the genre; Maloney opined that these records could not be viewed as pop-punk.

==== 2012–2016: Underground revival ====
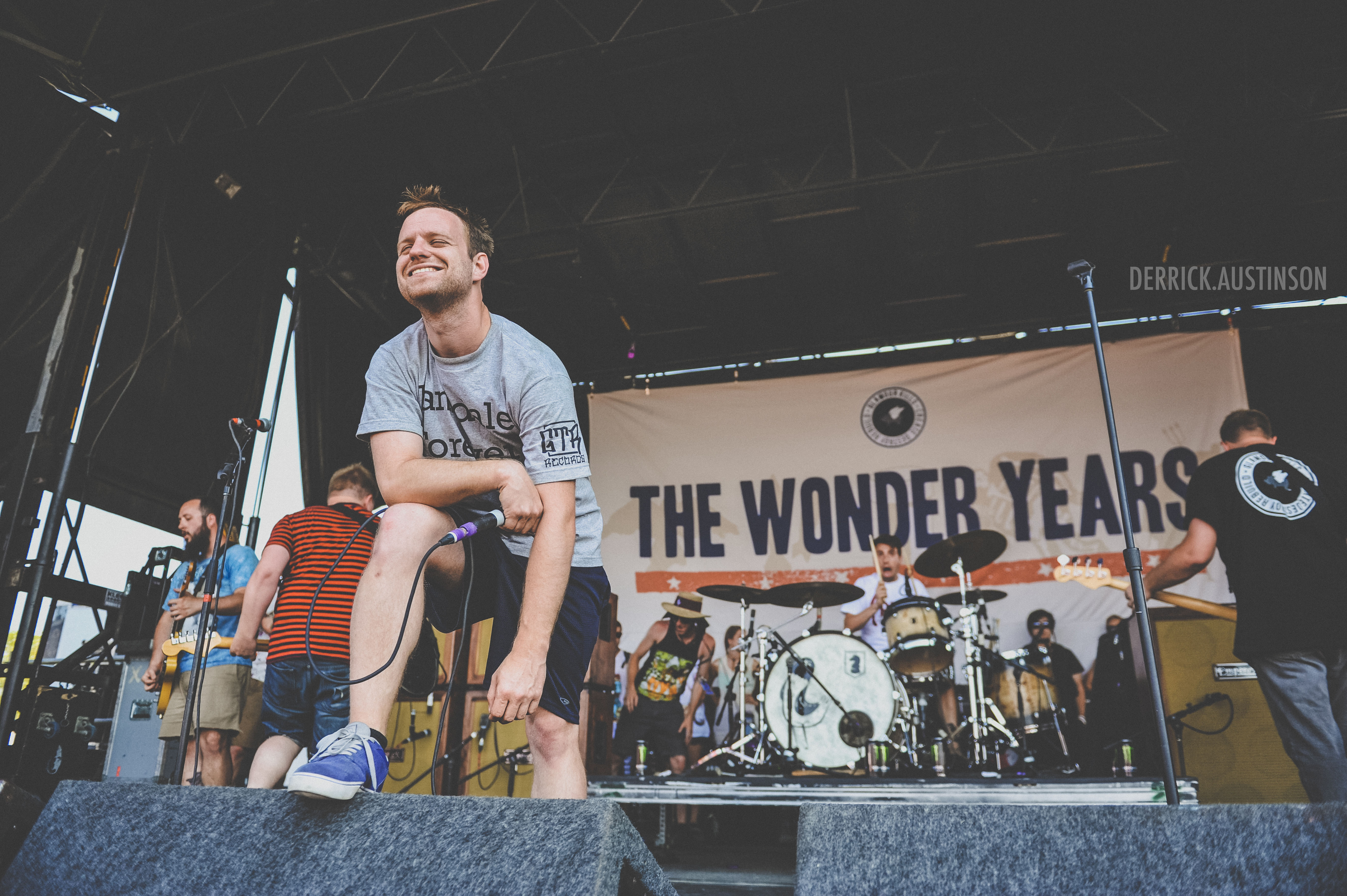
Pop-punk band The Wonder Years

In the early 2010s, a new wave of pop-punk groups emerged, fronted by Title Fight, the Wonder Years, Man Overboard, Transit and the Story So Far. Dave Beech of Clash noted that these groups were "[d]arker and more mature" than those previously, taking influence "and occasional indifference" from 1990s emo. Music commentator Finn McKenty also cited the influence from hardcore punk as being prominent during this period. At the time, some publications took to calling this style "tr00 pop punk". During this period, Man Overboard's "Defend Pop Punk" shirt design, which featured an AK-47, became a popular symbol of the scene, to the extent that a number of publication have posthumously described this period as the "Defend Pop Punk Era".

On the Wonder Years' The Upsides (2010), vocalist Dan Campbell sung about "His early twenties soul-searching and tales of strife" which "resonated with a [new] generation, inspiring countless imitators in the process." This pushed Campbell to "the forefront of a new wave", and the album influenced a new wave of pop-punk bands. Rock Sound included The Wonder Years' The Greatest Generation on their best albums of 2013 list, calling it "the defining album of what may well have been the genre's best year for a decade." Kerrang! said the album "ripped up the pop punk blueprint" pushing the genre to "new peaks of invention, both lyrically and musically." The Story So Far's What You Don't See (2013) "cemented their place at the top table of nu pop punk".

These bands quickly inspired a second-wave of the sound, which at the time, Stuff You Will Hate called "the tr00comers" (a portmanteau of tr00 and newcomers), whose major acts were Neck Deep, Seaway, Real Friends and Knuckle Puck. Many acts in this second wave received a larger amount of commercial success than the founding acts of the movement. In early 2014, Welsh band Neck Deep released their debut album Wishful Thinking, which Rock Sound later called it "the greatest UK pop punk record of all time. State Champs were also a prominent band of this time. By 2015, many North American acts in the movement had shifted their sound towards soft grunge music. However, the movement continued in the United Kingdom with Trash Boat, Roam, Boston Manor and WSTR, in a movement Stuff You Will Hate dubbed the "Tr00nited Kingdom".

I think pop-punk is a zombie. ... It hushed down for a bit but then it got brought back to life in an almost undead fashion. ... Back then it was mainstream, you would see it on MTV and things like that. Now, it's different, it's got a fighting chance and it's crawling its way back up. It started out with a pretty selective crowd but now it's opening up to more and more people.

— Kelen Capener of The Story So Far, 2012

Australian band 5 Seconds of Summer's 2014 self titled album debuted at number 1 on the Billboard 200 chart and in many other countries, and received what the Guardian journalist Harriet Gibsone described as "the kind of mania only ever granted to a massive boyband". However, the band's status as pop-punk was controversial. Alternative Press described the band as important to the marketing of the pop-punk scene, whereas in a Clash magazine interview with Terry Bezer, he described them as "not pop-punk... [but] a valuable gateway for young kids to begin taking their first steps towards bands of... more substance." Around this time, a number of other pop-punk-influenced pop artists gained mainstream attention, including Charli XCX and Halsey.

Several pop-punk bands embarked on anniversary tours in the early to mid-2010s, playing some of their most popular albums in full. While some members of these bands have had mixed feelings about these performances, quite often these tours sell as well as or better than the first time around. Club promoters in the UK have created nights based around lasting appreciation of the genre. The Warped Tour still attracts hundreds of thousands of attendees each year; the 2012 tour attracted 556,000 festival-goers, its third-best attendance. Bobby Olivier of The Star-Ledger wrote: "The genre ... continues to reinvent itself and Warped is pop punk's prom."

In 2016, Rolling Stone reported that pop-punk was "still one of the most predominant and popular rock genres". The magazine conducted a reader's poll for the "10 Best Pop-Punk Albums of All Time" that ultimately included Green Day (Dookie, American Idiot, Nimrod), Blink-182 (Enema of the State, Take Off Your Pants and Jacket, Dude Ranch), the Ramones (Ramones), the Offspring (Smash), Jimmy Eat World (Bleed American), and Generation X (Valley of the Dolls).

==== 2016–2019: Renewed mainstream interest ====
In the late 2010s, the genre was influential in the development of emo rap. Many emo rappers gained mainstream attention during this period. In particular, Lil Peep, Lil Uzi Vert, Juice WRLD and XXXTentacion were all vocal about their love for and influence from pop-punk. Emo rapper Wicca Phase Springs Eternal was even a member of the influential 2010s pop-punk band Tigers Jaw. This brought about a revived interest in the genre in popular culture, leading to a number notable artists beginning to release pop punk songs towards the end of the decade. Emo rapper Lil Aaron and pop singer Kim Petras released the pop-punk song "Anymore" on 5 September 2018. On 13 February 2019, Yungblud and pop singer Halsey released the pop-punk song "11 Minutes" featuring Travis Barker. The song was certified gold in the United States, peaked at number one on the Billboard Bubbling under Top 100 chart and was performed at the 2019 iHeartRadio Music Awards. On June 7, 2019, Machine Gun Kelly, who had been established as a rapper for over a decade, released the pop-punk song "I Think I'm Okay" featuring Yungblud and Travis Barker. His first release in the genre, the song was nominated at the 2019 Billboard Music Awards, and was certified platinum within a year. On 12 July 2019, Cold Hart and Yawns of the influential emo rap collective GothBoiClique, released the pop-punk album Good Morning Cruel World, and on September 18, 2019, emo rapper Lil Tracy released the pop-punk song "Beautiful Nightmare".

An October 2019 article by Mic cited emo rap as bringing an interest to a new wave of pop-punk groups like Stand Atlantic, Doll Skin, Waterparks and rapper Vic Mensa's band 93PUNX. Alternative Press also cited English bands Trash Boat, Boston Manor and As It Is as making "significant contributions to the latest revival era".

=== Mainstream resurgence (2020–present) ===
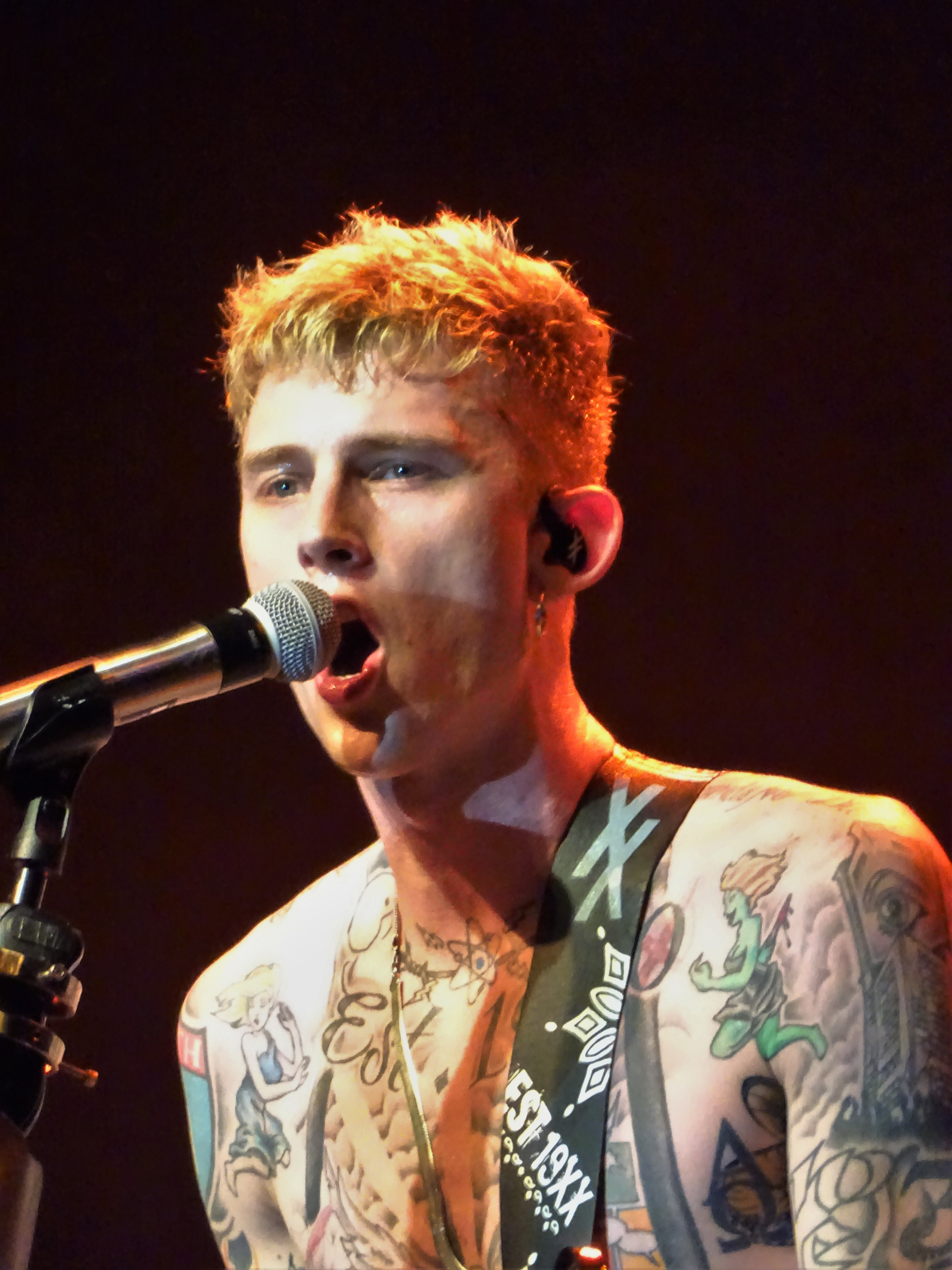
Machine Gun Kelly has been credited by publications such as Kerrang! as leading a pop-punk revival in the 2020s.

In September 2020, Machine Gun Kelly released his fifth studio album Tickets to My Downfall, his first entirely pop-punk album. The album debuted at number one on the Billboard 200 chart, becoming the first rock album to top the chart since Tool's Fear Inoculum in September 2019. The Evening Standard credited the album as "bridg[ing] the gap" between the modern pop punk scene and the mainstream interest that developed from the emo rap scene. "My Ex's Best Friend", a song from Tickets to My Downfall, peaked at number 20 on the Billboard Hot 100. Because of this, a number of media outlets began crediting him with leading a pop-punk revival.

An article by Kerrang! credited Machine Gun Kelly as well as Yungblud as bringing the genre back to mainstream attention. In addition to this, the publication cited the app TikTok as one of the key factors, as videos tagged #poppunk had received 400 million views by 21 January 2021. On the app, viral trends took place using tracks from pop-punk bands like All Time Low, Simple Plan and Paramore. Some popular TikTok content creators even began releasing music in the genre around this time. Notably, TikToker Jxdn began releasing pop-punk music in February 2020, while Huddy (then LilHuddy) began doing so the following year by releasing his debut single "21st Century Vampire". This led Polygon to term this new wave of artists "TikTokcore". Spin writer Al Shipley described pop-punk and its new association with hip hop as 2020's "commercial juggernaut".

Our Culture Mag cited KennyHoopla as a "key player in the [return] of the genre", and Kerrang! called him the "leader of pop punk's new generation". Olivia Rodrigo's 2021 pop-punk song "Good 4 U" peaked at number one on the Billboard singles chart, which according to Slate magazine, made it "rock's first hot 100 number 1 in years". Publications such as the Face, the Independent and USA Today cited this wave as having an increased diversity of sexuality, race and gender when compared to prior eras. A February 2021 article by Louder Sound cited artists like Meet Me at the Altar, Proper., Yours Truly, Noah Finnce and Jxdn as "reinventing pop-punk for 2021".

The influence of pop punk was also embraced by pop musicians on songs such as Olivia Rodrigo's "Bad Idea Right?" (2023)

== Offshoots and subgenres ==
=== Emo pop ===
Emo pop became popular in the mid-2000s, with record labels such as Fueled by Ramen releasing platinum albums from bands including My Chemical Romance, Fall Out Boy, Panic! at the Disco, Red Jumpsuit Apparatus, Jimmy Eat World, and Paramore. Maloney wrote: "While many pop punk fans adamantly deny any association between their favorite acts and those labeled "emo," crossover bands who melded the two have gradually put both genres in the same scene-boat."

=== Easycore ===
Easycore
- Other names: Popcore; dudecore; softcore; happy hardcore; EZ
- Stylistic origins: Pop-punk; metalcore
- Cultural origins: 2000s

Other topics
- Melodic hardcore; melodic metalcore

Easycore (less commonly known as popcore, dudecore, softcore, happy hardcore, and EZ) is a genre that merges pop-punk with elements of metalcore and hardcore punk. According to Loudwire: "It's got the hardcore aesthetic, but the mood and the tone are happy-go-lucky." It often makes use of breakdowns, screamed vocals, major key progressions and riffs and synthesizers. The genre's roots come from early 2000s pop-punk groups Sum 41 and New Found Glory. New Found Glory's self-titled and Sticks and Stones albums and Sum 41's song "Fat Lip" were some of the earliest and most influential released in the genre. The style's name originates from the 2008 "Easycore tour", which featured A Day to Remember, Four Year Strong and headliners New Found Glory, which itself was a pun based on the name of "hardcore punk".

=== Neon pop-punk ===
Neon pop-punk
- Other names: Neon pop
- Stylistic origins: Pop-punk; synth-pop
- Cultural origins: 2000s

Other topics
- Synth-punk

Neon pop-punk (also known as simply neon pop) is a form of pop-punk that emphasizes synthesizers. Alternative Press writer Tyler Sharp wrote that while this wasn't the first instance that "a band decided to put fuzzy keys over their chord progressions, but it was a time when that formula was perfected." Kika Chatterjee of Alternative Press added that the late 2000s "brought in glowing synths and poppy melodies that shifted the entire definition of [pop punk]", giving it the "neon" moniker. Sharp cited Forever the Sickest Kids' debut album Underdog Alma Mater (2008) as "a big moment" for the genre.

== Reception ==
The punk rock music community often perceived pop-punk to be, according to Iain Ellis of PopMatters, "too soft, too fake, too derivative, and too corporate". In a 2003 interview, Buzzcocks guitarist Steve Diggle would suggest that punk had become a "huge umbrella", stating, "And fair play to bands like Green Day and stuff, you know, they've been inspired when they were really young by us and the Clash and things, but it comes from a different well. When we started, punk to me was the Clash, the [Sex] Pistols, and the Buzzcocks over here [the United Kingdom], and in the [United] States it was the Dolls, Iggy, and the Ramones. We invented our style, just like the Clash did and the Ramones did. But the bands that have come later, some of them you see tend to just ape what went on before, where I'd rather them do their own thing a bit more with it."

Green Day were accused of selling out since the release of Dookie for signing to a major label and becoming mainstream. John Lydon of the 1970s punk band the Sex Pistols criticized Green Day and said that Green Day are not a punk band. Lydon said: "Don't try and tell me Green Day are punk. They're not, they're plonk and they're bandwagoning on something they didn't come up with themselves. I think they are phony." Green Day guitarist and lead singer Billie Joe Armstrong said: "Sometimes I think we've become redundant because we're this big band now; we've made a lot of money—we're not punk rock anymore. But then I think about it and just say, 'You can take us out of a punk rock environment, but you can't take the punk rock out of us.'"

Blink-182 also received a lot of criticism from punk rock fans, being accused of selling out for their pop-music-inspired style of punk. Lydon called Blink-182 "bunch of silly boys ... an imitation of a comedy act." Blink-182 guitarist and singer Tom DeLonge responded to criticism, saying: "I love all those criticisms, because fuck all those magazines! I hate with a passion Maximumrocknroll and all those zines that think they know what punk is supposed to be. I think it's so much more punk to piss people off than to conform to all those veganistic views."

In a November 2004 interview, Sum 41 rhythm guitarist and lead singer Deryck Whibley said: "We don't even consider ourselves punk. We're just a rock band. We want to do something different. We want to do our own thing. That's how music has always been to us." Sum 41's lead guitarist Dave Baksh reiterated Whibley's claims, stating "We just call ourselves rock... It's easier to say than punk, especially around all these fuckin' kids that think they know what punk is. Something that was based on not having any rules has probably been one of the strictest fucking rule books in the world."

Music critic for Treblezine Jeff Terich argued that the debate regarded the ethics of "pop-punk" is redundant, saying that there is "no discussion of the genre that doesn't eventually devolve into the black-mold-like growth of Disney-approved mallrats, but the irony of it is that all punk is pop. The Ramones? Pop. The Clash? Pop. And The Buzzcocks? Damn right they're pop."

== See also ==
- List of pop-punk albums
- List of pop-punk bands
- Skate punk
- Scene (subculture)
- Post-hardcore
