= Real Friends discography =

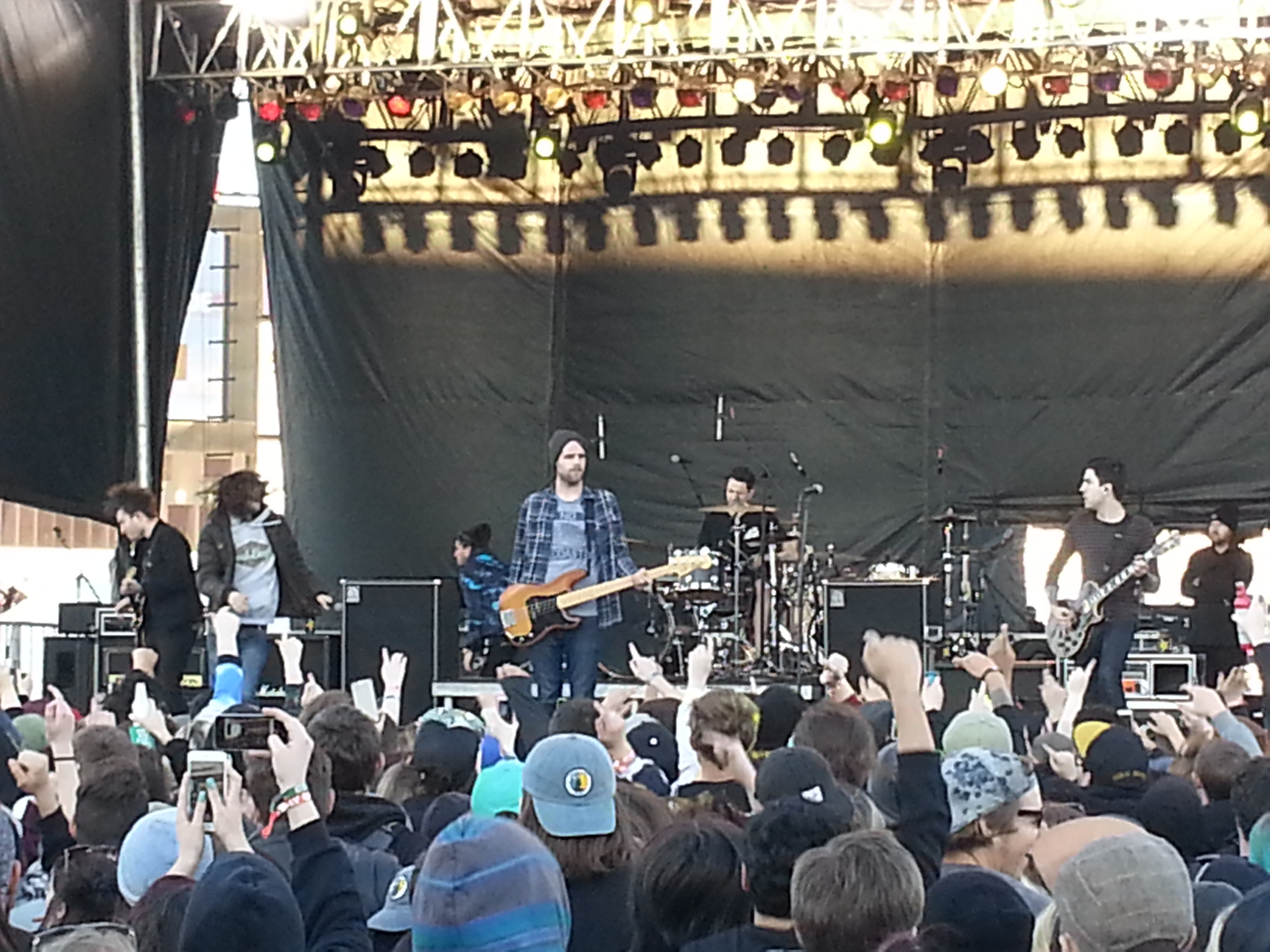
- Studio albums: 4
- EPs: 7
- Compilation albums: 1
- Singles: 17
- Music videos: 14

American rock band Real Friends has released four studio albums, seven extended plays and 17 singles, and 14 music videos

== Studio albums ==
Title	Album details	Peak chart positions	Sales
Title	Album details	US	Sales
Maybe This Place Is the Same and We're Just Changing	Released: July 22, 2014; Label: Fearless (30197); Format: CD, CS, DL, LP	24	US: 10,300
The Home Inside My Head	Released: May 27, 2016; Label: Fearless; Format: CD, DL, LP	53	
Composure	Released: July 13, 2018; Label: Fearless; Format: CD, DL, LP	166	
Blue Hour	Released: October 11, 2024; Label: Midwest Trash; Format: CD, DL, LP		

== Compilation albums ==
Title	Album details
Everyone That Dragged You Here (Note: Repackages Everyone That Dragged You Here and Acoustic Songs with two new acoustic tracks.)	Released: May 8, 2013; Label: Ice Grill$ (IG-034); Format: CD

== Extended plays ==
Title	Album details	Peak chart positions
Title	Album details	US Heat
This Is Honesty	Released: April 11, 2011; Label: Self-released; Format: CD, DL	—
Everyone That Dragged You Here	Released: January 24, 2012; Label: Self-released; Format: CD, CS, DL, 12" vinyl	—
Acoustic Songs	Released: May 15, 2012; Label: Self-released; Format: DL	—
Three Songs About the Past Year of My Life	Released: November 13, 2012; Label: Self-released; Format: DL, 7" vinyl	—
Put Yourself Back Together	Released: June 4, 2013; Label: Self-released; Format: CD, DL, 12" vinyl	28
More Acoustic Songs	Released: April 28, 2015; Label: Fearless (FRL30205); Format: DL, 12" vinyl	—
Torn in Two	Released: September 17, 2021; Label: Pure Noise; Format: CD, CS, DL, 12" vinyl	—
"—" denotes releases that did not chart or were not released in that territory.

== Singles ==
List of singles, showing year released and album name
Title	Year	Album
"Cheap Talk and Eager Lies"	2011	Non-album single
"Loose Ends"	2014	Maybe This Place Is the Same and We're Just Changing
"Sixteen"	2014	Maybe This Place Is the Same and We're Just Changing
"I Don't Love You Anymore"	2014	Maybe This Place Is the Same and We're Just Changing
"Looking Back" (This Wild Life cover)	2016	Non-album single (Note: Later included as a bonus track on The Home Inside My Head.)
"Colder Quicker"	2016	The Home Inside My Head
"Scared to Be Alone"	2016	The Home Inside My Head
"Mess"	2016	The Home Inside My Head
"Mokena"	2016	The Home Inside My Head
"Get By"	2017	Composure
"Duality" (Slipknot cover)	2019	Non-album single
"Nervous Wreck" / "Storyteller"	2021	Torn in Two
"Tonight, Tonight"	2021	Non-album singles
"Nervous Wreck" (featuring Milk)	2021	Non-album singles
"Tell Me You're Sorry"	2022	Six Feet
"Tell Me You're Sorry" (Acoustic)	2022	Six Feet
"When You Were Here"	2023	Non-album single
"Waiting Room"	2024	Blue Hour
"Our Love Was Like A Sad Song"	2024	Blue Hour
"Never Has Become Always"	2024	Blue Hour

== Music videos ==
List of music videos, showing year released and director
Title	Year	Director
"Late Nights in My Car"	2013	Several Guys
"Loose Ends"	2014	Jered Scott
"I Don't Love You Anymore"	2014	Eric Teti
"Summer"	2015	Max Moore
"Sixteen"	2015	Max Moore
"Colder Quicker"	2016	Sam Halleen & Flo Mihr
"Scared to Be Alone"	2016	Max Moore
"Mess"	2016	Kyle Thrash
"Empty Picture Frames"	2017	Eric Teti
"From The Outside"	2018	Caleb Mallery
"Me First"	2018	
"Teeth"	2021	Raúl Gonzo
"Nervous Wreck"	2021	Raúl Gonzo
"The Damage is Done"	2023	Alex Zarek
"When You Were Here"	2023	Errick Easterday & Michael Herrick
"Waiting Room"	2024	Errick Easterday & Michael Herrick
"Never Has Become Always"	2024	Errick Easterday & Michael Herrick
"Cold Blooded"	2024	Michael Herrick

== Other appearances ==
Title	Year	Album
"I Had a Heart"	2013	Punk Goes Christmas
