= Knuckle Puck discography =

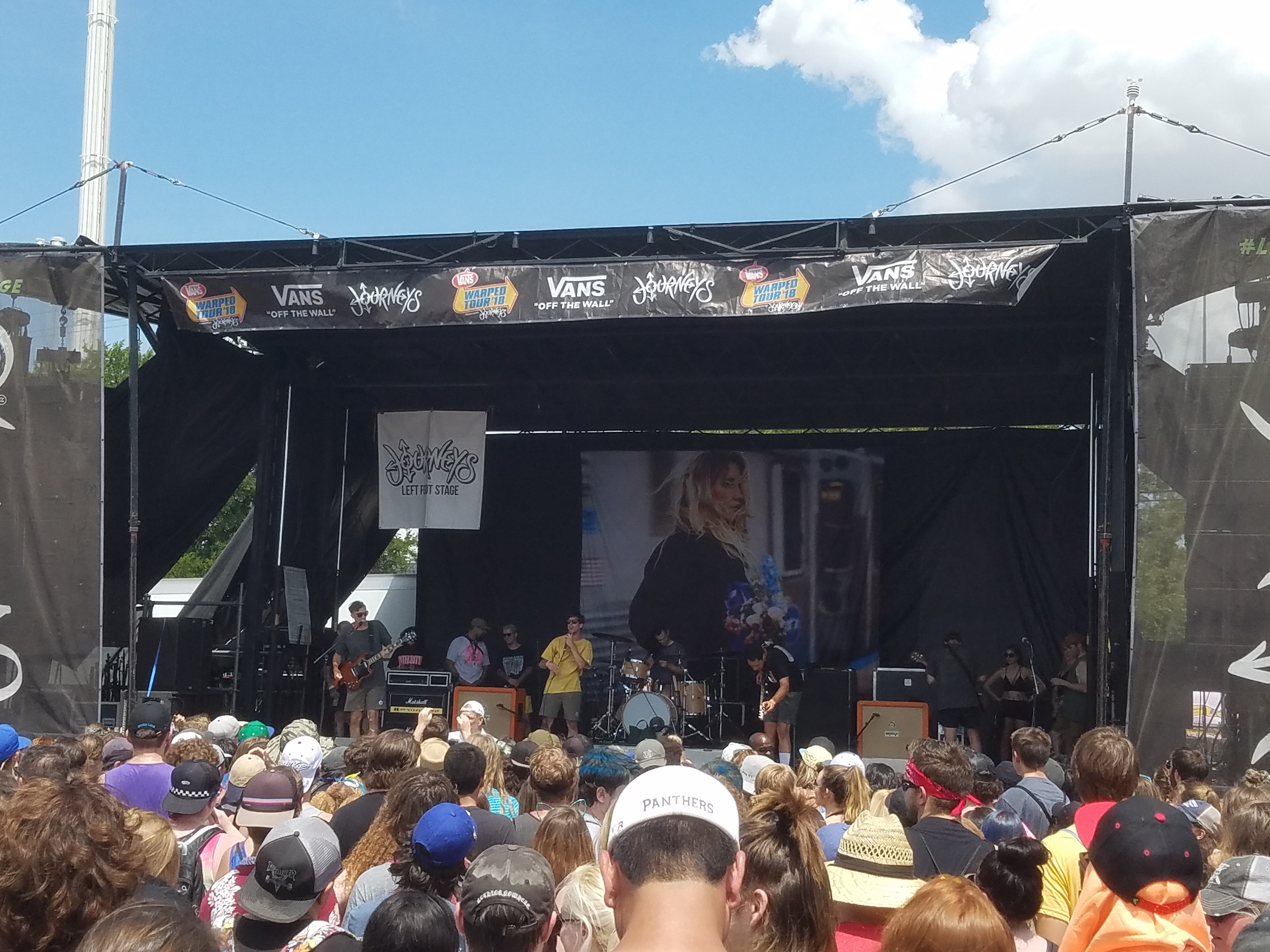
- Studio albums: 4
- EPs: 6
- Compilation albums: 1
- Singles: 2
- Music videos: 4

The discography of Knuckle Puck, an American rock band, consists of four studio albums, two compilation albums, six extended plays, three singles, and one other release.

== Studio albums ==
List of studio albums
Title	Album details	Peak chart positions	Sales
Title	Album details	US	Sales
Copacetic	Released: July 31, 2015; Label: Rise (RISE 278); Format: CD, CS, DL, LP	61	US: 8,482
Shapeshifter	Released: October 13, 2017; Label: Rise; Format: CD, CS, DL, LP	50	
20/20	Released: September 18, 2020; Label: Rise; Format: CD, CS, DL, LP	-	
Losing What We Love	Released: October 23, 2023; Label: Pure Noise Records; Format: CD, CS, DL, LP	-	

== Extended plays ==
List of extended plays
Title	Album details	Peak chart positions
Title	Album details	US Heat
Knuckle Puck	Released: October 31, 2011; Label: Self-released; Format: DL	—
Acoustics	Released: March 1, 2012; Label: Self-released; Format: DL	—
Don't Come Home (Note: The EP was reissued with an additional track, "Townsend", by Bad Timing in January 2015.)	Released: October 30, 2012; Label: Self-released; Format: CD, CS, DL, 7" vinyl	—
The Weight That You Buried (Note: A deluxe edition of the EP was released in November 2013 with two acoustic bonus tracks via Glamour Kills. A vinyl edition was released through Bad Timing in April 2014.)	Released: August 30, 2013; Label: Self-released; Format: CD, CS, DL, 12" vinyl	—
Neck Deep/Knuckle Puck (split EP)	Released: February 25, 2014; Label: Bad Timing/Hopeless (BTR-004/NDKP); Format: DL, 7" vinyl	—
While I Stay Secluded (Note: The EP was released in the UK and Europe through Rude.)	Released: October 28, 2014; Label: Bad Timing (BTR-012); Format: CD, CS, DL, 12" vinyl	5
Disposable Life	Released: February 4, 2022; Label: Wax Bodega; Format: DL, 12" vinyl	—
"—" denotes releases that did not chart or were not released in that territory.

== Compilation albums ==
List of compilation albums
Title	Album details
2012–2013 Mixtape (Note: Compilation of Acoustics, Don't Come Home and The Weight That You Buried EPs.)	Released: May 14, 2014; Label: Ice Grill$ (IG-049); Format: CD
Retrospective (Note: Compilation of Don't Come Home, The Weight That You Buried, their songs off Neck Deep / Knuckle Puck, and While I Stay Secluded.)	Released: November 22, 2022; Label: Bad Timing; Format: DL, 12" vinyl

== Singles ==
List of singles, showing year released and album name
Title	Year	Album
"Disdain"	2015	Copacetic
"True Contrite"	2015	Copacetic
"Calendar Days"/"Indecisive"	2017	

== Others ==
List of other releases
Title	EP details
"Oak Street"	Released: September 2, 2014; Label: Bad Timing (BTR-011); Format: DL, 7" flexi

== Original multi-artist compilation appearances ==
List of original multi-artist compilation appearances, with contribution, showing year released and album name
Title	Album details	Contribution
Punk Goes Pop 6	Released: November 17, 2014; Label: Fearless (FRL30203); Format: CD, DL	"Chocolate" (The 1975 cover)

== Music videos ==
List of music videos, showing year released and director(s) name
Title	Year	Director
"No Good"	2014	Eric Teti
"Oak Street"	2014	—
"Disdain"	2015	Max Moore
"True Contrite"	2015	Max Moore
"Pretense"	2016	YEAH! Films
"Double Helix"	2017	Shifty Dimensions
"Gone"	2017	YEAH! Films
"Want Me Around"	2018	YEAH! Films
"Breathe"	2020	Ian Shelton

== See also ==
- List of songs recorded by Knuckle Puck
