= Heavy Heart =

Heavy Heart may refer to:

- A metaphor for sadness
- A Heavy Heart, a 2015 German film

== Music ==
- Heavy Heart (band), a British alternative rock band
- Heavy Hearts (band), a Canadian punk rock band
- The Heavy Hearts, an American alternative rock band
- Heavy Heart (album), a 1984 jazz album by Carla Bley
- Heavy Hearts, a 2014 metalcore album by For the Fallen Dreams
- "Heavy Heart" (song), a 1998 alternative rock song by You Am I
