= Composure (Real Friends album) =

Studio album by Real Friends
- Released: July 13, 2018
- Length: 32:53
- Label: Fearless
- Producers: Mike Green; Jeremy McKinnon

Real Friends chronology
The Home Inside My Head (2016)	Composure (2018)	Torn in Two (2021)

Composure is the third studio album by American pop-punk band Real Friends. It was released on July 13, 2018 through Fearless Records. It is their last release through the company as well as their last to feature lead vocalist Dan Lambton before his departure from the group in 2020.

== Background ==
Real Friends released their second studio album The Home Inside My Head in May 2016. It peaked at number 53 on the Billboard 200 in the United States; they promoted it with an appearance at Slam Dunk Festival in the United Kingdom, joining the Warped Tour touring festival and supporting the Wonder Years in the US, a headlining UK tour and a headlining US tour through to June 2017.

== Release ==
"Get By" was released as a single on November 16, 2017. To promote it, the band played a short, three-date tour they dubbed A Weekend in the Midwest Tour, with support from Life Lessons. To close out the year, Real Friends played two holiday shows with Knuckle Puck; both bands were supported by This Wild Life, Pet Symmetry, Free Throw and Hot Mulligan. The band were planned to support Simple Plan on their headlining tour of Australia, and visit Europe, but these treks were cancelled in March 2018 with the band citing mental health reasons. "From the Outside" was released as a single on June 4, 2018. Coinciding with this, the song's music video was posted online. On June 18, 2018, Composure was announced for release the following month, with its track listing and artwork being revealed. "Smiling on the Surface" was released as a single on June 19, 2018. Two days later, the band embarked on the Warped Tour touring festival across North America until August 2018. "Unconditional Love" was released as a single on July 6, 2018. Composure was released on July 13, 2018, through Fearless Records; it was promoted with three listening parties ahead of its release.

In October and November 2018, Real Friends went on a headlining US tour, with support from Boston Manor, Grayscale and Eat Your Heart Out. A music video was released for "Me First" on October 29, 2018. In January 2019, Real Friends appeared at the Maine's 8123 Fest, which was followed by a tour of Latin America the following month. In May 2019, they then performed at the Slam Dunk Festival in the UK. Following this, they supported New Found Glory on their North American tour through to July 2019. In the midst of this, Real Friends released the Even More Acoustic Songs EP, which featured versions of "From the Outside", "Me First", "Composure" and "Get By"; the first of these, "From the Outside", had been issued ahead of the EP. In August and September 2019, they went on a short Midwestern and East Coast tour with support from Pronoun and Keep Flying. Following an appearance at Four Chord Music Festival, Real Friends went on European tour with support from Grayscale and Belmont in October and November 2019.

== Reception ==
Professional ratings
Review scores
Source	Rating
Exclaim!	6/10

Composure peaked at number 166 on Billboard 200. It also appeared on a variety of Billboard component charts: number 11 on Vinyl Albums, number 15 on Top Alternative Albums, number 25 on Top Album Sales and number 37 on Top Rock Albums. Alternative Press included the album on their list of the year's best releases.

== Track listing ==
1. "Me First" – 3:13
2. "Stand Steady" – 3:26
3. "From the Outside" – 3:05
4. "Smiling on the Surface" – 3:07
5. "Hear What You Want" – 3:16
6. "Unconditional Love" – 3:41
7. "Composure" – 3:15
8. "Get By" – 3:32
9. "Ripcord" – 3:19
10. "Take a Hint" – 2:59

== Personnel ==
Real Friends

- Dan Lambton – lead vocals
- Dave Knox – lead guitar, backing vocals
- Eric Haines – rhythm guitar
- Kyle Fasel – bass
- Brian Blake – drums, percussion

Production

- Mike Green – production, engineering
- Jeremy McKinnon – production
- Kris Crummett – mixing, mastering

Artwork

- Florian Mihr – album cover artwork

== Charts ==
Chart performance for Composure
Chart (2018)	Peak position
US Billboard 200	166
US Top Album Sales (Billboard)	25
US Top Alternative Albums (Billboard)	15
US Top Rock Albums (Billboard)	37
US Vinyl Albums (Billboard)	11
