= Shapeshifter (Knuckle Puck album) =

Studio album by Knuckle Puck
- Released: October 13, 2017
- Genres: Pop-punk, emo
- Length: 31:03
- Label: Rise
- Producer: Seth Henderson

Knuckle Puck chronology
Copacetic (2015)	Shapeshifter (2017)	20/20 (2020)

Shapeshifter is the second studio album by American pop-punk band Knuckle Puck. It was released on October 13, 2017 through Rise Records.

The album's themes include personal development and freedom.

== Background ==
In March 2017, Knuckle Puck released a seven-inch vinyl record, featuring the tracks "Calendar Days" and "Indecisive". From here until May 2017, the band supported Mayday Parade on their headlining tour of the United States, and appeared at the So What?! Music Fest.

When the band attempted to record a new album, it did not go as they intended, as guitarist Nick Casasanto explained they were "having such a struggle and being so disconnected in the recording process felt wrong". They decided to collaborate with Seth Henderson, who had produced Copacectic. Casasanto said there was a "glaring parallel between what was going on with the record and what we were writing about at the time."

== Release ==
On July 27, 2017, Shapeshifter was announced for released in three months' time. Alongside this, "Gone" was made available for streaming. A music video for "Double Helix" was released on September 13, 2017, the same day the track was made available for streaming; "Want Me Around" was then made available for streaming on October 6, 2017. They promoted the album with a US tour in October and November 2017, with support from Movements, With Confidence and Homesafe. A music video was released for "Gone" on October 19, 2017; it apes the video for "The Rock Show" (2001) by Blink-182, depicting a birthday party held in the Northwest of Indiana. Following this, the band planned to headline a European tour with support from Tiny Moving Parts and Movements. Have Mercy was also intended to join, but had to pull out citing mental health reasons. Before it was underway, Knuckle Puck cancelled the tour outright, also citing mental health issues. At the end of the year, they co-headlined The Holiday Extravaganza festival with Real Friends.

In March and April 2018, Knuckle Puck went on a headlining US, with support from Boston Manor, Free Throw, Hot Mulligan and Jetty Bones. The Shifted EP was released in April 2018, featuring reworked versions of five tracks from Shapeshifter; it was preceded by "Conduit" and "Nervous Passenger". Following this, they appeared at the Galaxy Camp festival in Germany and Switzerland, and Slam Dunk Festival in the United Kingdom, and played three regular shows in mainland Europe with State Champs. A music video was released for "Want Me Around" on June 7, 2018. Shortly after this, the band performed on the Warped Tour festival across the US. In October 2018, the band went on a headlining UK tour with support from Tiny Moving Parts and Movements. followed by a support slot for Good Charlotte on their headlining US tour, which ran into November 2018. Knuckle Puck closed out the year co-headlining the Snowed in festival with Knocked Loose.

== Reception ==
Professional ratings
Aggregate scores
Source	Rating
Metacritic	84/100
Review scores
Source	Rating
Paste	7.2/10
Rock Sound	9/10

Shapeshifter was met with universal acclaim from music critics. At Metacritic, which assigns a normalized rating out of 100 to reviews from mainstream publications, the album received an average score of 84, based on four reviews.

It peaked at number 50 on the Billboard 200; it reached the top 10 on the Alternative Albums, Independent Albums and Top Rock Albums.

== Track listing ==
No.	Title	Length
1.	"Nervous Passenger"	1:31
2.	"Twist"	3:02
3.	"Double Helix"	2:50
4.	"Gone"	3:05
5.	"Everyone Lies to Me"	2:53
6.	"Stuck in Our Ways"	3:02
7.	"Want Me Around"	3:31
8.	"Conduit"	3:33
9.	"Wait"	3:27
10.	"Plastic Brains"	4:09

== Personnel ==
- Joe Taylor – lead vocals
- Nick Casasanto – rhythm guitar, co-lead vocals
- Kevin Maida – lead guitar
- Ryan Rumchaks – bass, backing vocals
- John Siorek – drums

== Charts ==
Chart (2017)	Peak position
US Billboard 200	50
US Independent Albums (Billboard)	3
US Top Alternative Albums (Billboard)	7
US Top Rock Albums (Billboard)	9
