= List of songs recorded by Knuckle Puck =

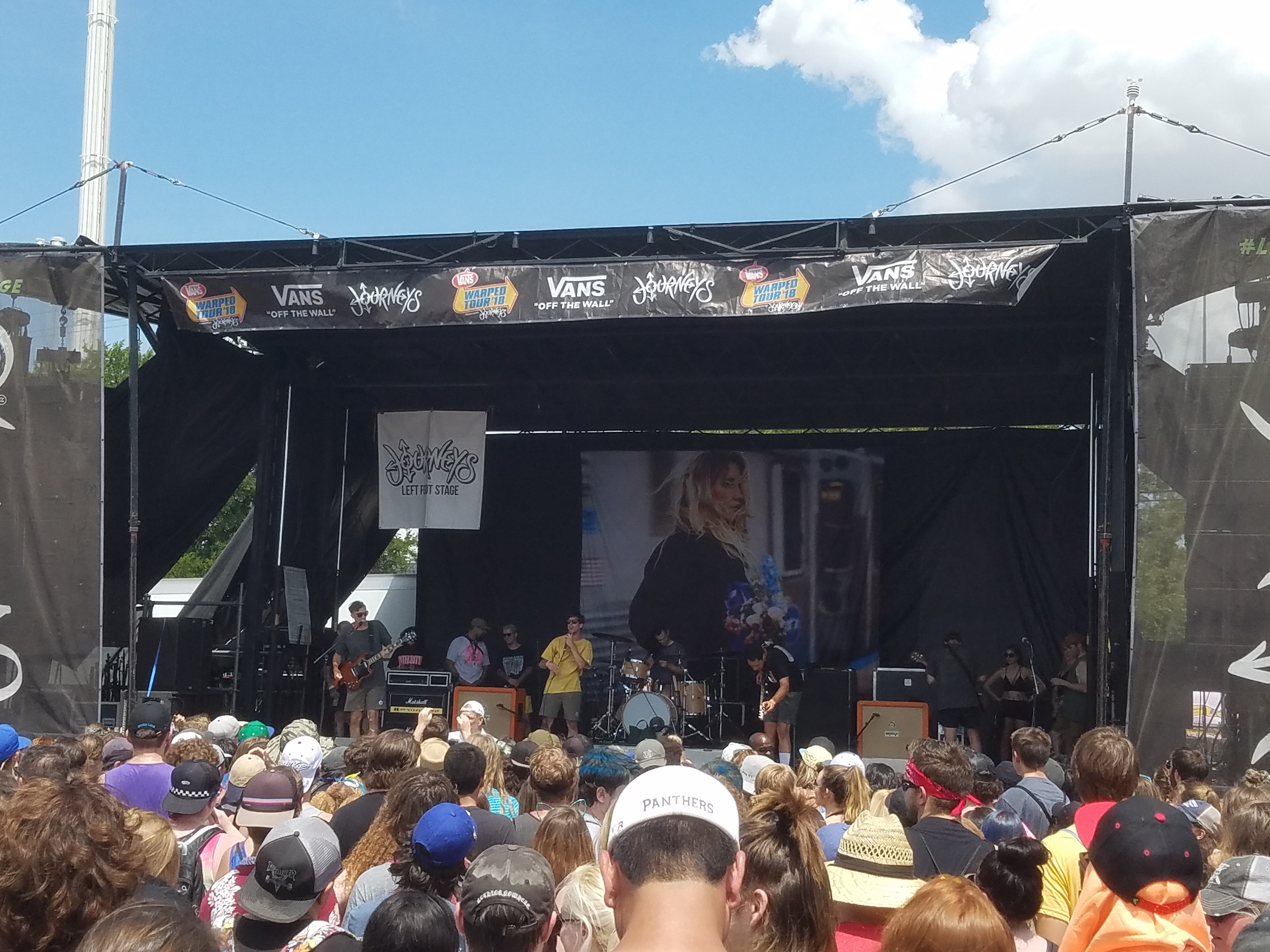
Knuckle Puck performing in 2018

The following is a sortable table of all songs by Knuckle Puck.

== Studio recordings ==
Song	Writer(s)	Album	Producer	Year	Length
"Alexander Pl."	Nick Casasanto, Kevin Maida, John Siorek, Joe Taylor	While I Stay Secluded (EP)	—	2014	3:06
"Bedford Falls"	Nick Casasanto, Kevin Maida, John Siorek, Joe Taylor	While I Stay Secluded (EP)	—	2014	3:28
"But Why Would You Care?"	Nick Casasanto, Kevin Maida, John Siorek, Joe Taylor	While I Stay Secluded (EP)	—	2014	4:01
"Chocolate" (The 1975 cover)	George Daniel, Matthew Healy, Adam Hann, Ross MacDonald	Punk Goes Pop 6	—	2014	3:52
"Dead Wrong"	—	Knuckle Puck (EP)	—	2011	1:32
"Dead Wrong"^{[C]}	—	Don't Come Home (EP)	—	2012	1:25
"Disdain"	Nick Casasanto, Kevin Maida, Ryan Rumchaks, John Siorek, Joe Taylor	Copacetic	Seth Henderson	2015	2:44
"Evergreen"	Nick Casasanto, Kevin Maida, Ryan Rumchaks, John Siorek, Joe Taylor	Copacetic	Seth Henderson	2015	3:28
"Everything Must Go"^{[C]}	Nick Casasanto, Kevin Maida, John Siorek, Joe Taylor	The Weight That You Buried (EP)	—	2013	2:55
"Fences"	Nick Casasanto, Kevin Maida, John Siorek, Joe Taylor	Neck Deep/Knuckle Puck (split EP)	—	2014	2:06
"Give Up"^{[C]}	Nick Casasanto, Kevin Maida, John Siorek, Joe Taylor	Don't Come Home (EP)	—	2012	1:21
"Gold Rush"	Nick Casasanto, Kevin Maida, John Siorek, Joe Taylor	Neck Deep/Knuckle Puck (split EP)	—	2014	2:55
"Home Alone"	Nick Casasanto, Kevin Maida, John Siorek, Joe Taylor	"Oak Street"	—	2014	2:15
"In My Room"	Nick Casasanto, Kevin Maida, John Siorek, Joe Taylor	While I Stay Secluded (EP)	—	2014	3:52
"In Your Crosshairs"	Nick Casasanto, Kevin Maida, Ryan Rumchaks, John Siorek, Joe Taylor	Copacetic	Seth Henderson	2015	4:42
"No Good"^{[C]}	Nick Casasanto, Kevin Maida, John Siorek, Joe Taylor	The Weight That You Buried (EP)	—	2013	2:55
"No Good" (acoustic)^{[A]}	Nick Casasanto, Kevin Maida, John Siorek, Joe Taylor	The Weight That You Buried (EP)	—	2013	4:16
"Oak Street"	Nick Casasanto, Kevin Maida, John Siorek, Joe Taylor	While I Stay Secluded (EP)	—	2014	2:53
"Poison Pen Letter"	Nick Casasanto, Kevin Maida, Ryan Rumchaks, John Siorek, Joe Taylor	Copacetic	Seth Henderson	2015	3:39
"Ponder"	Nick Casasanto, Kevin Maida, Ryan Rumchaks, John Siorek, Joe Taylor	Copacetic	Seth Henderson	2015	2:10
"Poor Excuses"^{[C]}	Nick Casasanto, Kevin Maida, John Siorek, Joe Taylor	Acoustics (EP)	—	2012	1:28
"Pretense"	Nick Casasanto, Kevin Maida, Ryan Rumchaks, John Siorek, Joe Taylor	Copacetic	Seth Henderson	2015	3:05
"Stateside"^{[C]}	Nick Casasanto, Kevin Maida, John Siorek, Joe Taylor	The Weight That You Buried (EP)	—	2013	3:20
"Stationary"	Nick Casasanto, Kevin Maida, Ryan Rumchaks, John Siorek, Joe Taylor	Copacetic	Seth Henderson	2015	2:05
"Stuck"	Nick Casasanto, Kevin Maida, John Siorek, Joe Taylor	Knuckle Puck (EP)	—	2011	3:11
"Stuck"^{[C]}	Nick Casasanto, Kevin Maida, John Siorek, Joe Taylor	Don't Come Home (EP)	—	2012	2:54
"Swing"	Nick Casasanto, Kevin Maida, Ryan Rumchaks, John Siorek, Joe Taylor	Copacetic	Seth Henderson	2015	3:43
"Townsend"	—	Don't Come Home (EP)	—	2015	3:24
"Transparency"	Nick Casasanto, Kevin Maida, John Siorek, Joe Taylor	While I Stay Secluded (EP)	—	2014	3:28
"True Contrite"	Nick Casasanto, Kevin Maida, Ryan Rumchaks, John Siorek, Joe Taylor	Copacetic	Seth Henderson	2015	4:55
"Untitled"	Nick Casasanto, Kevin Maida, Ryan Rumchaks, John Siorek, Joe Taylor	Copacetic	Seth Henderson	2015	7:51
"Wall to Wall (Depreciation)"	Nick Casasanto, Kevin Maida, Ryan Rumchaks, John Siorek, Joe Taylor	Copacetic	Seth Henderson	2015	2:18
"Watterson"	—	Knuckle Puck (EP)	—	2011	3:22
"Woodwork"	Nick Casasanto, Kevin Maida, John Siorek, Joe Taylor	Knuckle Puck (EP)	—	2011	3:37
"Woodwork"	Nick Casasanto, Kevin Maida, John Siorek, Joe Taylor	Acoustics (EP)	—	2012	3:48
"Woodwork"^{[C]}	Nick Casasanto, Kevin Maida, John Siorek, Joe Taylor	Don't Come Home (EP)	—	2012	3:52
"Your Back Porch"^{[C]}	Nick Casasanto, Kevin Maida, John Siorek, Joe Taylor	The Weight That You Buried (EP)	—	2013	3:07
"Your Back Porch" (acoustic)^{[A]}	Nick Casasanto, Kevin Maida, John Siorek, Joe Taylor	The Weight That You Buried (EP)	—	2013	3:38

== See also ==
- Knuckle Puck discography
