= The Home Inside My Head =

Studio album by Real Friends
- Released: May 27, 2016
- Recorded: January 2016
- Studios: The Omen Room, Mike Green's studio
- Genres: Pop punk; emo
- Length: 37:36
- Label: Fearless
- Producers: Steve Evetts, Mike Green

Real Friends chronology
Maybe This Place Is the Same and We're Just Changing (2014)	The Home Inside My Head (2016)	Composure (2018)

Singles from The Home Inside My Head
- 1. "Colder Quicker" Released: April 1, 2016

The Home Inside My Head is the second studio album by American pop punk band Real Friends. The album was recorded throughout the early months of 2016. The album was released through Fearless on May 27, 2016.

== Writing and recording ==
On the album's recording process, the band collectively stated in a Facebook post that “in the winter of 2014 we started writing our second full length record. In the beginning of the writing process the songs quickly fell into a special place. As time went on we finished more songs. The songs became attached to us unlike any other material we had written before. There was just something about these. They just felt right when we played them”. The band then went to record in January 2016 but “didn’t really tell anyone. We wanted to put all of our efforts into it without distractions.” The majority of the songs were recorded with producer Steve Evetts and assistant engineer Allan Hessler at The Omen Room in Garden Grove, California. "Empty Picture Frames", "Mess", and "Colder Quicker" was recorded at Mike Green's studio in Los Angeles, California with Green producing. Vince Ratti mixed the album at The Skylight in Fairless Hills, Pennsylvania, before it was mastered by Alan Douches at West West Side Music in New Windsor, New York.

== Release ==
Fearless Records announced that a new Real Friends record would be released on their label in 2016, through a post on their official Twitter account, which was made on December 22, 2015. In March 2016, the band went on a US headlining tour with Movements. On April 1, the band announced the title of their new album as being The Home Inside My Head, along with the album's release date, cover art and track listing. Additionally, on the same day the band released a music video for the first single from their upcoming album, "Colder Quicker". On April 22, "Scared to Be Alone" was made available for streaming; a music video was released for it, directed by Max Moore. On May 6, "Mess" was made available for streaming; a live video was released for it, shot by Sam Halleen, and consisted of footage from their March tour. "Mokena" premiered through Alternative Press' website on May 19.

The Home Inside My Head was released on May 27. Vinyl editions came with download cards where people could download the album with the band's cover the This Wild Life song "Looking Back" as a bonus track. The Target and European editions of the album included two bonus tracks: "I Was Blind the Whole Time" and "Seed". Following this, the group performed at Slam Dunk Festival in the UK. Between June and August, the band appeared on the 2016 Warped Tour. From mid October to late November, the band supported the Wonder Years on their tour of the US On October 25, a music video was released for "Mess". The band were scheduled to go on a headlining UK tour of the UK in December, with support from Knuckle Puck and With Confidence, however, it was postponed until early 2017 due to Lambton suffering from mental health issues. A music video was released for "Empty Picture Frames", directed by Eric Teti, on March 28, 2017. Between April and June, they embarked on a US tour with Have Mercy, Tiny Moving Parts, Broadside and Nothing,Nowhere.

== Track listing ==
Writing credits per booklet.

No.	Title	Lyrics	Music	Length
1.	"Stay in One Place"	Dan Lambton	Real Friends	2:56
2.	"Empty Picture Frames"	Kyle Fasel	Real Friends, Mike Green	3:05
3.	"Keep Lying to Me"	Fasel	Real Friends	2:57
4.	"Scared to Be Alone"	Fasel	Real Friends	3:14
5.	"Mokena"	Fasel	Real Friends	3:23
6.	"Mess"	Fasel	Real Friends, Green	3:08
7.	"Isolating Everything"	Lambton	Real Friends	2:53
8.	"Well, I'm Sorry"	Fasel	Real Friends	3:22
9.	"Basement Stairs"	Fasel	Real Friends	2:55
10.	"Door Without a Key"	Fasel	Real Friends	3:28
11.	"Eastwick"	Lambton	Real Friends	3:05
12.	"Colder Quicker"	Lambton	Real Friends, Green	3:03
Total length:				37:36

Bonus tracks

Dropcards.com bonus track
No.	Title	Length
13.	"Looking Back" (This Wild Life cover)	3:49

Target/European edition
No.	Title	Length
13.	"I Was Blind the Whole Time"	3:13
14.	"Seed"	3:10

== Personnel ==
Personnel per sleeve.

Real Friends

- Kyle Fasel – bass guitar
- Dave Knox – lead guitar
- Dan Lambton – lead vocals
- Brian Blake – drums
- Eric Haines – rhythm guitar

Production

- Steve Evetts – producer, recording
- Allan Hessler – assistant engineer
- Mike Green – recording and producing on tracks 2, 6 and 12
- Vince Ratti – mixing
- Alan Douches – mastering
- Brian Manley – photography
- Megan Leetz – photography
- Florian Mihr – layout

== Charts ==
Chart (2016)	Peak position
US Billboard 200	53
US Billboard Vinyl Albums	3
