= Rarity (band) =

Canadian post-hardcore band

- Origin: Hamilton, Ontario, Canada
- Genres: Post-hardcore; melodic hardcore; pop punk
- Years active: 2014–present
- Labels: Rise; Good Fight; New Damage
- Members: Loeden Learn; Evan Woods; Cole Gardner; Adam Clarke
- Past members: Alex Stojsavljevic; Zach Pasquale; Corbin Giroux
- Website: www.raritytheband.com

Rarity is a Canadian post-hardcore band from Hamilton, Ontario, Canada, formed in 2014. The band consists of lead vocalist Loeden Learn, guitarists Adam Clarke, bass guitarist Cole Gardner, and drummer Evan Woods. They signed with Rise Records and released their debut EP, Alive In Your Eyes in 2015. The band released their debut studio album, I Couldn't Be Weaker, in April 2016. The group has toured with multiple musical groups such as Silverstein, Vanna, Being As An Ocean, Emarosa, Coldrain, Seaway, and State Champs.

== Career ==
Before the formation of Rarity, Learn, Pasquale, Woods, and Stojsavljevic formed the easycore band Safe and Sound. After the band was displeased with its musical direction, they disbanded and formed the pop punk group Face Value, which garnered attention from Good Fight and Rise Records. They changed their name to Rarity due to legal issues and signed with the label in 2015.

Rarity formed in 2014 with lead vocalist Loeden Learn, guitarists Adam Clarke and Zachary Pasquale, drummer Evan Woods, and bass guitarist Alex Stojsavljevic and began touring after graduating high school. The band announced that they signed to Rise Records on February 18, 2015, and released their debut EP, Alive In Your Eyes, for free streaming and download. The EP was produced by Sam Guaiana. On the same day, the band released the music video for their single "Anne Hathaway".

Stojsavljevic left the band in 2016, and was replaced by Cole Gardner in 2017.

They performed at So What?! Music Festival on March 20, 2016. The group released the single "Orchid", featuring A Sight For Sewn Eyes vocalist Joshua Hanusiak on March 30, 2016. The band recorded their debut studio album, I Couldn't Be Weaker, over the course of a year throughout 2015 with producer Seth Henderson in Indiana. The album was released on April 15, 2016, to critical acclaim. The album was made available to stream in its entirety online on April 13.

Silverstein announced their headlining U.S. winter tour with special guests Rarity, Being As An Ocean, Emarosa, and Coldrain, which took place from February 29 to March 31, 2016. Rarity also embarked on a string of North American tour dates with Silverstein from May 16 to May 23. Rarity toured as a supporting act on Ontario pop punk band Seaway's 2016 Canadian Tour! alongside Coldfront from July 2 to July 29, 2016.

The band announced their second studio album The Longest Lonesome will be released August 30, 2019. Three singles came with the announcement: "I'll Come Around", "Shawinigan", and "Drown Me Out". All three singles were also accompanied by music videos.

On January 15, 2024, via their Instagram page the band announced that they would be releasing two new songs. On January 18, the band released the music video for "Keep it to Yourself" as well as the single "OKAY". On February 6, the band announced three headline shows with support from DON’T TRY and F!TH. The group released the music video for "OKAY" on February 8.

On February 22, it was announced that they would be playing Excellency Music Festival in Bay City, Michigan on August 3 with bands such as Free Throw (band) and Prince Daddy & the Hyena. On March 7, the group announced their third full-length album Lower Feeling would be released on June 7 and accompanied that announcement with the third single and music video "Brain Dance". On March 14, Trophy Eyes announced that they were going on tour in the United States with support from Rarity and House & Home.

On April 11, the band released the fourth and fifth singles from the album Lower Feeling, "Kiss!" and "Sick To My Stomach". A little over a month later "who gives a fuck?" was released on May 16 as the sixth and final single before the album.

On June 7, Lower Feeling was released through New Damage Records.

== Musical style ==
Rarity has drawn comparisons to The Story So Far, The Wonder Years, and Alexisonfire. The band's sound has been labeled as post-hardcore, pop punk, and punk rock.

On their debut studio album, I Couldn't Be Weaker, the band collaborated with pop punk band State Champs lead vocalist Derek DiScanio and A Sight for Sewn Eyes vocalist Joshua Hanusiak. The album was produced by Seth Henderson, who has produced records by other pop punk bands such as Real Friends and Knuckle Puck.

Learn described Rarity was only a pop punk band throughout the recording process of the Alive In Your Eyes EP in 2015, and that the band has evolved into a punk and post-hardcore group. In an interview with Alternative Press, Woods revealed that the band was heavily influenced by pop punk and Counterparts.

== Band members ==
Current

- Loeden "Ray" Learn – vocals (2014–present)
- Adam Clarke – guitar (2014–present)
- Cole Gardner – bass, vocals (2016–present)
- Evan Woods – drums, percussion (2014–present)

Former

- Alex Stojsavljevic – bass (2014–2016)
- Zachary Pasquale – guitar (2014–2016)
- Corbin Giroux – guitar, vocals (2016–2021)

Touring

- Aidan "Squid" Stoddard – guitar, vocals (2021–present)

== Discography ==
=== Studio albums ===
- I Couldn't Be Weaker (Rise, 2016)
- The Longest Lonesome (New Damage, 2019)
- Lower Feeling (New Damage, 2024)

=== EPs ===
- Alive In Your Eyes (Rise, 2015)

=== Singles ===
- Worn Down/Leave It Alone (New Damage, 2020)

=== Music videos ===
- "Anne Hathaway" (2015)
- "Stranger" (2016)
- "Inhale" (2016)
- "I'll Come Around" (2019)
- "Shawinigan" (2019)
- "Drown Me Out" (2019)
- "Keep it to Yourself" (2024)
- "OKAY" (2024)
- "Brain Dance" (2024)
- "Kiss!" (2024)
- "who gives a f*ck?" (2024)
