= Colour Blind (Seaway album) =

Studio album by Seaway
- Released: October 23, 2015
- Genre: Pop punk
- Length: 37:50
- Label: Pure Noise
- Producers: Derek Hoffman, Alan Day

Seaway chronology
All in My Head (2014)	Colour Blind (2015)	Vacation (2017)

Singles from Colour Blind
- 1. "Freak" Released: August 28, 2015; 2. "Best Mistake" Released: September 11, 2015; 3. "Airhead" Released: September 25, 2015; 4. "Growing Stale" Released: October 9, 2015

Colour Blind is the second studio album by Canadian rock band Seaway and follow-up to 2013's Hoser.

== Background and production ==
In July 2014, it was announced that Seaway had signed a worldwide recording contract with California-based label Pure Noise. The band called the staff members at Pure Noise "some of the coolest, realest people" in the music industry. The group toured later in the year, before releasing the All in My Head EP in November.

Alan Day of Four Year Strong and Derek Hoffman produced Colour Blind. Hoffman engineered the recordings at Fox Sounds Studios. While recording, the band members agreed that "Freak" would be the first track from the sessions as it "embodies the fun, playful feel that we were going for" when they were composing and tracking Colour Blind. Kyle Black mixed the album, while Brian "Big Bass" Gardner mastered it. The Fullblast vocalist Ian Stanger provides guest vocals on "The Day That She Left".

== Composition ==
The band was credited with writing all of the songs on the album. The lyrics for every song on the record were written by guitarist/vocalist Patrick Carleton and guitarist Andrew Eichinger, with the exception of ""Airhead", which was written by Kent Sheehey. Carleton and Eichinger would write their parts separately, before coming together to finish up the compositions. The album has been described as pop punk. The creation of "Best Mistake" was taken from a demo that the band made for All in My Head. The group restructured the song and "completely turned [it] around", according to Eichinger.

"Best Mistake" is about "where you find or stumble upon someone almost by mistake but then ultimately realize that it was never really a mistake at all and actually a perfect situation." "Freak" is about "being an outcast and a weirdo, but being completely okay with it", according to vocalist Ryan Locke. "Airhead" was a new kind of song for the band, as they haven't previously made "a simple, mid-tempo, groovy song like this before", according to Eichinger. "Growing Stale" was the last song completed for the album. Co-producer Alan Day instructed Carleton and Eichinger to leave the control room and "blast ["Growing Stale"] out together." The pair were initially wary of this before they ""bounc[ed] ideas off each other really easily and came out with a sound that's a little unique" for the group.

== Release ==
On August 19, 2015, Colour Blind was announced for release, and the album's artwork was revealed. The artwork design was done by Jake Carruthers. "Freak" was made available for streaming, as well as a music video for the song. The music video consists of archive footage of the band filmed during their high school years by Miguel Barbosa of YEAH! Films. "Freak" was released as a single on August 28. "Best Mistake" was made available for streaming on September 9 and released as a single two days later. "Airhead" was made available for streaming on September 23 and was released as a single two days later. "Growing Stale" was made available for streaming on October 7 and was released as a single two days later. On October 19, Colour Blind was made available for streaming and was released on October 23 through Pure Noise. Three days later, a music video for "Best Mistake" was released.

The band supported Knuckle Puck on their tour of the U.S. in October and November 2015. In March and April 2016, the band supported Knuckle Puck on their UK headlining tour. In April and May, the band co-headlined the Pure Noise Records Tour with Hit the Lights and support from Can't Swim and Casey Bolles. From mid October to late November, the band supported The Wonder Years on their tour of the U.S.

== Reception ==
Professional ratings
Review scores
Source	Rating
AllMusic	3.5/5 stars
Alternative Press Japan	4/5 stars
Exclaim!	7/10
Rock Sound	8/10
Upset	4/5 stars

Comparing the record to pop-punk staples like New Found Glory, All Time Low and the Ataris, Peter Sanfilippo of Exclaim! praised the element of familiarity, writing that it "proves the members of Seaway are experts of their craft, and offer fans of pop punk a record they can immediately vibe with."

== Track listing ==
All songs written by Seaway. All lyrics written by Patrick Carleton and Andrew Eichinger, except "Airhead" by Kent Sheehey.

1. "Slam" – 2:13
2. "Best Mistake" – 3:17
3. "Trick (So Sweet)" – 2:30
4. "Freak" – 3:04
5. "Still Weird" – 3:19
6. "Stubborn Love" – 3:48
7. "Big Deal" – 2:40
8. "Airhead" – 3:33
9. "Growing Stale" – 3:33
10. "The Day That She Left" – 3:02
11. "Turn Me Away" – 3:05
12. "Goon" – 3:41

== Personnel ==
Personnel per sleeve.

Seaway

- Ryan Locke – lead vocals
- Patrick Carleton – rhythm guitar, vocals
- Andrew Eichinger – lead guitar, backing vocals
- Adam Shoji – bass
- Ken Taylor – drums

Additional musician

- Ian Stanger – guest vocals on "The Day That She Left"

Production

- Derek Hoffman – producer, engineer
- Alan Day – producer
- Kyle Black – mixing
- Brian "Big Bass" Gardner – mastering
- Demi Cambridge – artwork photography
- Jake Carruthers – artwork graphic design

== Chart performance ==
Chart (2015)	Peak position
US Billboard Heatseekers Albums	3
US Billboard Independent Albums	28
US Billboard Top Rock Albums	38
