= Westmount Secondary School =

Location
- 39 Montcalm Drive; Hamilton, Ontario, L9C 4B1; Canada; 43°13′38″N 79°53′45″W

Information
- School type: Secondary school
- Motto: Laboris Dulcedo ( Meaning the sweetness of labor or pleasure in the work )
- School board: HWDSB
- Superintendent: Jahkobi Edward
- Area trustee: Becky Buck
- School number: 952478
- Principal: Kristen Armstrong
- Grades: 9-12
- Enrolment: 1540 (21 September 2014)
- Language: English
- Hours in school day: 6.35 ( 6 hours and 35 minutes)
- Colours: Blue & White
- Mascot: Wildcats
- Nickname: The Wildcats
- Newspaper: Paw Prints
- Public transit access: HSR 41 Mohawk and 35 College
- Special Programs: Advanced Placement; Self-Paced, Self-Directed; Sports Academy; Specialist High Skills Major
- Website: www.hwdsb.on.ca/westmount/

Westmount Secondary School is a secondary school in Hamilton, Ontario, Canada. It is a member of the Hamilton-Wentworth District School Board. The school opened in 1961, and has a 2017-2018 enrolment of 1520 students.

== Programs ==
The school is a member of the Canadian Coalition of Self-Directed Learning. Westmount also offers gifted classes, special education classes, as well as an ESL program.

Westmount is a multicultural school. The student population consists of a variety of religions and ethnicities. The school is also home to Christian, Muslim and Hindu prayer societies, each meeting occasionally to carry out religious tasks.

It was previously the only secondary school in Hamilton to make it into the Fraser Institute's top 100 High Schools in Ontario, ranked at #84 out of 718.

In 2019, its Reach for the Top team – coached by Jay Misuk – became the first team from Hamilton to qualify for the national championship after finishing second at provincials. The Westmount team subsequently won the national title match against a team from Lisgar Collegiate Institute.

== Notable alumni ==
- Summer Mortimer, Paralympic swimmer and world record holder
- Tony Peebles, member of Grammy award-winning Pacific Mambo Orchestra
- Elias Dummer, member of Juno award-winning The City Harmonic
- Paul Chafe, author/soldier
- Patrick McKenna, actor
- Haydain Neale, musician, with Jacksoul (deceased)
- Wei Chen, host, CBC Radio One, Ontario Morning
- Jim Witter, musician
- Michael Simoncic, Professional Football Player, Ottawa Rough Riders 1995-1996, Canadian Football League.
- Jeffery Croonen, Professional Football Player, CFL 1989 to 1993, 2 Grey Cup wins. Winnipeg Blue Bombers, Edmonton Eskimos, Hamilton Tiger-Cats and Toronto Argonauts
- Bruce Boyko, Professional Football Player, CFL 1990 to 1999, Saskatchewan Roughriders, Winnipeg Blue Bombers and BC Lions
- Allan Boyko, Professional Football Player, CFL 1991 to 1997, Saskatchewan Roughriders & Winnipeg Blue Bombers
- Adam Clarke, musician, Rarity (band)
- Evan Woods, musician, Rarity (band)

== See also ==
- Education in Ontario
- List of secondary schools in Ontario

== Sources ==
- Hamilton Community Foundation. Protecting Our Environment Together (POET): Youth Focus 2004-2005 Grants. Retrieved June 30, 2005.
- Fitzgerald, Tony: "Westmount students making waves", The Hamilton Spectator, (23 February 2005)
- Eastwood, Joel:"The Spirit of Westmount", The Hamilton Spectator, (17 January 2006)
- Welcome, hwdsb.on.ca, Retrieved December 21, 2010.
- Simoncic, Michael": 1995 Ottawa Rough Riders season", Wikipedia - C.F.L., (28 May 2012)
