= Heavy Hearts (band) =

- Origin: Niagara-on-the-Lake, Ontario, Canada
- Genres: Alternative rock, punk, post-hardcore
- Years active: 2013–present
- Members: Justin Glatt; Jamie Gorman; Riley Jensen; Joey Demers
- Website: Official website

Heavy Hearts is a Canadian alternative rock band from Niagara-on-the-Lake, Ontario, formed in 2013. The band has released three EPs and one studio album. Their sophomore album Room With a View was released on June 26, 2020.

== History ==
The four band members came together in 2013 in Niagara-on-the-Lake, Ontario. Vocalist and guitarist Justin Glatt has commented on how growing up in the small town inspired some of their earlier music.

Heavy Hearts self-released their debut EP Jacoba in 2013. In 2015, they released their second EP entitled Somewhere, A While Ago. They signed to the label New Damage Records to release their third EP in March 2016, and in July 2016 Heavy Hearts released their first full-length album Bliss, released under New Damage Records.

Heavy Hearts' sound is influenced by early 2000s emo punk as well as 1990s alternative rock. The band has been described as "an emotional mixture of screams and singing" as well as "Taking Back Sunday all grown up and self-aware." They have also been compared to bands like Balance and Composure, Citizen, and Turnover, with their "unique and intense sound full of effects-laden guitars and emotive vocals."

They have played many shows with other Canadian alternative bands including Seaway, Coldfront, Rarity, Life in Vacuum, and Sparrows. In 2016, they accompanied Seaway on their Canadian Tour along with Coldfront and Rarity. In 2017, the band began their longest tour in the United States with American based bands Fossil Youth and Sleep In.

Heavy Hearts released their On A Chain EP on October 27, 2017, under New Damage Records and Failure by Design Records. It has been described as a confirmation "that they have grown musically and made a huge leap forward in the short sixteen months between releases." Following that release, the band embarked on a UK/EU tour with Lightcliffe.

In 2018, the band began work on their second full-length album. The first single, "Cut Too Deep", was released on September 12, 2018. In late 2019, the band parted ways with their previous label ahead of the second single, "Vexed".

== Discography ==
=== Studio albums ===
List of studio albums
Title	Album details
Bliss	Released June 24, 2016; Label: New Damage Records; Format: CD, DL, LP
Room With a View	Released June 26, 2020; Label: Independent; Format: DL, LP

=== Extended plays ===
List of extended plays
Title	Album details
Jacoba	Released October 8, 2013; Label: Self Released; Format: CD, DL
Somewhere, A While Ago	Released February 3, 2015; Label: Self Released; Format: DL, 7" Vinyl
Self Titled (Trustfall)	Released March 4, 2016; Label: New Damage Records; Format: DL, CD
On A Chain	Released October 27, 2017; Label: New Damage Records (CAN), Failure By Design Records (UK & Europe); Format: DL, CD, LP

=== Singles ===
List of singles
Title	Year	Album
"Bliss" (Single)	April 2016	Bliss
"Gloom"	May 2016	Bliss
"Basement Jesus"	June 2016	Bliss
"Unravel (Your Love)"	July 2017	On A Chain
"Easy Mark"	August 2017	On A Chain
"Cut Too Deep"	September 2018	Room With a View
"Vexed"	January 2020	Room With a View
"Safe Bet"	March 2020	Room With a View
"Out of Reach"	May 2020	Room With a View

== Members ==
Current

- Justin Glatt - lead vocals, guitar
- Jamie Gorman - bass guitar
- Riley Jensen - lead guitar
- Joey Demers - drums, percussion, backing vocals

Past Members

- JJ Sorensen - Drums
- Davis Maxwell - Drums, Percussion
- Connor Greenway - Drums, Percussion
- Shaun O'Melia - Guitar
