= Stationary =

Stationary may refer to:

- "Stationary", a song from Copacetic (Knuckle Puck album)
- a common misspelling of "stationery", meaning office supplies
- stationary process, in mathematics and statistics, a process whose probability distribution does not change over time.
- stationary set, in set theory, a set which intersects all club sets.
