= Jayden Seeley =

Australian Musician

- Born: Jayden James Seeley; November 19, 1992; Sydney, Australia
- Genres: Rock; Pop; Pop-Punk
- Occupations: Singer; songwriter; record producer
- Instruments: Vocals; guitar; bass; piano; keyboards; drums
- Years active: 2012–present
- Labels: Hopeless Records
- Formerly of: With Confidence

Jayden Seeley is an Australian musician, songwriter, multi-instrumentalist, and record producer. He was the lead singer and bassist of the Rock band With Confidence.

Seeley has written and produced songs for artists including Zach Hood, Set It Off, Pop Evil, Point North, Games We Play, Hey Violet, Ryan Oakes, and more.

== Personal life ==
Jayden Seeley was born and raised in the Western Suburbs of Sydney, Australia..

At age 17, Jayden started posting covers on YouTube and performing at local music festivals. He then went on to form Rock band With Confidence with friends out of high-school, signing to Hopeless Records in 2016.

He now lives in Los Angeles, California.

== Career ==
=== With Confidence ===
With high school friends Josh Brozzesi and Samuel Haynes, Seeley formed the rock band With Confidence in 2012. After various lineup changes over the next few years, the final iteration included Seeley, Brozzesi, Inigo Del Carmen, and Scott Mclaughlin. In 2016, the band released their debut album "Better Weather," and signed to Hopeless Records. The album received positive reviews, won an APMA award, and charted number 22 on the ARIA Albums Chart. To promote the album, the band made their United States touring debut on the Vans Warped Tour.

In the years that followed With Confidence went on to support tours with 5 Seconds of Summer, State Champs, Neck Deep, Stand Atlantic, played festivals Vans Warped Tour, Slam Dunk Festival, and released two more studio albums, "Love & Loathing," and self-titled "With Confidence."

They continued touring internationally until their final tour in December of 2022.

=== Songwriting career ===
In 2018, Seeley began working closely with producer Mike Green. Since then he has been writing and producing for artists in his own Los Angeles, California studio. He had early success when song 'Isabelle' hit Spotify's 'Viral 50' playlists world-wide, and amassed large streaming numbers.

To date, Seeley’s catalog has accumulated hundreds of millions of streams worldwide.
