= You'll Be Fine (album) =

Studio album by Hot Mulligan
- Released: March 6, 2020
- Recorded: 2019
- Genre: Emo
- Length: 31:17
- Label: No Sleep

Hot Mulligan chronology
Pilot (2018)	You'll Be Fine (2020)	Why Would I Watch (2023)

Singles from You'll Be Fine
- 1. "Feal Like Crab" Released: December 13, 2019

You'll Be Fine (stylized in all-lowercase) is the second studio album by American emo band, Hot Mulligan. It was released on March 6, 2020 through No Sleep Records.

The song "Feal Like Crab" was released as a single ahead of the album's release.

== Critical reception ==
Professional ratings
Review scores
Source	Rating
Exclaim!	6/10
Pitchfork	6.7/10
Punknews.org	4/5 stars
The Soundboard	7/10

You'll be Fine has received generally positive reviews from contemporary music critics. Luke Nuttall writing for The Soundboard awarded the album a 7 out of 10 rating admitting that "Hot Mulligan haven't come out with a genre-defining opus", but noted that Youll Be Fine "can consistently keep up an emotional core that’s so much more real and an instrumental canvas that directly benefits it without sacrificing its overall melodiousness". Ian Cohen, writing for Pitchfork gave the album a 6.7 out of 10 rating saying that the album's sound feels dated, and that it feels more like an early 2010's emo revival album. Cohen said of You'll be Fine that it "feels like a product of another era: itching to cross over, but without anywhere to cross over to".

== Track listing ==
You'll Be Fine track listing
No.	Title	Length
1.	"OG Bule Sky"	2:37
2.	"*Equip Sunglasses*"	2:46
3.	"Feal Like Crab"	3:07
4.	"Green Squirrel In Pretty Bad Shape"	3:24
5.	"Dirty Office Bongos"	3:15
6.	"Analog Fade (New Bule Sky)"	2:34
7.	"We're Gonna Make It to Kilby!"	3:05
8.	"Digging In"	2:44
9.	"SPS"	2:28
10.	"BCKYRD"	3:23
11.	"The Song Formerly Known As Intro"	1:51
Total length:		31:17

== Chart performance ==
Chart performance for You'll Be Fine
Chart (2020)	Peak position
UK Independent Albums (OCC)	16
UK Vinyl Albums (OCC)	22
