= The Sound a Body Makes When It's Still =

Studio album by Hot Mulligan
- Released: August 22, 2025
- Studio: The Barbershop
- Genre: Emo
- Length: 42:46
- Label: Wax Bodega
- Producer: Brett Romnes

Hot Mulligan chronology
Why Would I Watch (2023)	The Sound a Body Makes When It's Still (2025)

Singles from The Sound a Body Makes When It's Still
- 1. "And a Big Load" Released: June 3, 2025

The Sound a Body Makes When It's Still is the fourth studio album by American emo band Hot Mulligan. It was released on August 22, 2025, via Wax Bodega in vinyl, CD and digital formats.

== Background ==
Consisting of sixteen tracks, the album was preceded by the band's 2023 release, Why Would I Watch. Tades Sanville of the band commented that the title originated from lyrics of a song relating to paranoia. "And a Big Load" was released as the album's first single on June 3, 2025, alongside a music video directed by Michael Herrick.

== Reception ==
Professional ratings
Review scores
Source	Rating
Distorted Sound	9/10
Kerrang	4/5
New Noise	4/5 stars
The Skinny	4/5 stars

The Sound a Body Makes When It's Still received generally positive reviews from multiple publications, several of which described it as one of the band's best albums.

Amber Bintliff, writing for Melodic, referred to the album as the band's "hardest hitting record to date" and "arguably the loudest, most sincere, and well-rounded that the group has ever been." New Noise's Kayla Moreno rated it four stars and described it as "biting, timely, and topical," in addition to stating it "could easily be classified as Hot Mulligan's best work." Andrew Sacher of BrooklynVegan noted that The Sound a Body Makes When It's Still is "just one cathartic release after the next", calling it the band's "biggest and best album yet."

The album received a verdict of four out of five from Kerrang!, whose reviewer James MacKinnon described it as "proof that they're maturing into their elder emo status." Dylan Tuck, for the Skinny, opined that the album is "another collection of consistently hook-heavy, happy-clappy choruses, and belt-along lines that continues their trend of honing the fine emo craft," giving it a rating of four stars.

Assigning the album a rating of nine out of ten, Ed Walton of Distorted Sound stated that it "feels like Hot Mulligan leaning fully into who they are: raw, sincere, and unwilling to compromise," noting "it's not their flashiest record, but it's one that rewards patience and deep listening."

== Track listing ==
All tracks are written by Hot Mulligan.

No.	Title	Length
1.	"Moving to Bed Bug Island"	3:20
2.	"And a Big Load"	2:53
3.	"It Smells Like Fudge Axe in Here"	3:26
4.	"Island in the Sun" (featuring Cory Castro)	2:29
5.	"Bon Jonah"	3:34
6.	"This Makes Me Yummy"	1:11
7.	"Monica Lewinskibidi"	3:25
8.	"Milam Minute"	1:45
9.	"Cream of Wheat of Feet Naw Cream Of (Feat.)"	2:03
10.	"Mix Master Wade on the Beat"	2:44
11.	"Carbon Monoxide Hotel"	3:34
12.	"This Makes Me Yucky"	1:52
13.	"Let Me See Your Mounts"	1:40
14.	"Monster Burger and a $5 Beer"	3:11
15.	"Slumdog Scungillionaire"	4:05
16.	"My Dad Told Me to Write a Nice One for Nana So Here It Is"	1:34
Total length:		42:46

== Personnel ==
Credits adapted from the album's liner notes.

=== Hot Mulligan ===
- Ryan Malicsi – guitar
- Brandon Blakeley – drums
- Tades Sanville – vocals
- Jonah Kramer – bass
- Chris Freeman – vocals, guitar

=== Additional contributors ===
- Brett Romnes – production, engineering, mixing
- Mike Kalajian – mastering
- Kay Dargen – photography, artwork

== Charts ==
Chart performance for The Sound a Body Makes When It's Still
Chart (2025)	Peak position
Scottish Albums (OCC)	62
UK Albums Sales (OCC)	66
UK Independent Albums (OCC)	24
US Billboard 200	175
US Independent Albums (Billboard)	27
