= Seaway (band) =

Canadian rock band

- Origin: Oakville, Ontario, Canada
- Genres: Alternative rock; emo; pop punk
- Years active: 2011–2022
- Labels: Mutant League; Pure Noise; Dine Alone
- Past members: Patrick Carleton; Andrew Eichinger; Ryan Locke; Adam Shoji; Ken Taylor
- Website: seawayband.com

Seaway was a Canadian rock band from Oakville, Ontario signed to Pure Noise Records and Dine Alone Records.

== History ==
=== Formation and early releases (2011–2013) ===
Seaway formed in 2011 in Oakville, Ontario, consisting of Ryan Locke on lead vocals, Patrick Carleton on rhythm guitar and vocals, Andrew Eichinger on lead guitar, Adam Shoji on bass, and Ken Taylor on drums. All of the members have been friends since high school. Locke, Eichinger, and Taylor began playing music together as early as grade 5, performing at talent shows and for other friends. Seaway was originally a side-project of hardcore band The Fellowship, which featured Locke on drums, Eichinger on guitar and Taylor on vocals.

The band released their debut full-length record Hoser in 2013 through Mutant League Records. They began to tour, supporting Major League in February and March 2014. Seaway went on a co-headlining summer 2014 tour with Stickup Kid, with support from Driver Friendly, from early July to late August.

=== Pure Noise Records (2014–2017) ===
In July 2014, Seaway signed to Pure Noise Records. In September, the band performed at Riot Fest. In October, the group supported Bayside on their headlining US tour. On November 4, Seaway released and released their debut EP All In My Head featuring the singles "Your Best Friend" and "Alberta." In November, they supported Four Year Strong on their headlining US tour. The band went on to tour heavily in 2015. Seaway supported Neck Deep on The Intercontinental Championships tour in the United Kingdom throughout January and February. In March, the band went on to support Bayside on their 15th anniversary tour through the United States. The group joined As It Is and This Wild Life in the United Kingdom once again in May, as a support act, and performed both at Slam Dunk Festival (UK) and Warped Tour. On August 19, Seaway released a music video for the first single of their sophomore record Colour Blind, directly by YEAH! Films and featuring footage from the band's high school years.

On September 23, 2015, a second single titled "Airhead" was made available for streaming. Colour Blind, Seaway's first full-length album on Pure Noise records was released on October 23. Three days later, a music video for the single "Best Mistake" was released. The band toured the U.S. in October and November, supporting Knuckle Puck with support from Head North and Sorority Noise.

In March/April 2016, Seaway joined Knuckle Puck on a UK/Europe tour with additional support from Boston Manor. On April 5, the band released a music video for "Stubborn Love". The band then toured as part of the Pure Noise Tour 2016, as direct support to Hit the Lights. Seaway began their first Canadian headliner in July 2016, with support from Rarity and Coldfront. In the fall of 2016, the band went on tour with The Wonder Years, Real Friends, Knuckle Puck, and Moose Blood.

In October 2016, Seaway announced plans to headline a tour in the United Kingdom for early 2017. In March and April 2017, Seaway supported Simple Plan on the No Pads, No Helmets... Just Balls anniversary tour through Canada and the United States. Prior to the tour, the band had announced a return to the studio for pre-production on their next album. The group announced the completion of LP3 on May 21.

=== Signing to Dine Alone and Vacation (2017–2019) ===
On July 13, 2017, it was reported that Seaway had signed to Dine Alone Records to handle the Canadian distribution for their next LP Vacation. Album artwork, track listing and a music video for the first single "Apartment" was also released at this time. The band released a second single, "Something Wonderful" in August, while the band was on tour with With Confidence in Australia.

Vacation was released on September 14, 2017, to positive reviews. Alternative Press wrote that Seaway "levelled up in the pop-punk world" and that the album contained "tracks so damn catchy you’ll be singing along upon first listen" giving the album 4.5/5 stars. Andy Biddulph from Rock Sound gave the album 8/10, saying "this is the moment Seaway become real contenders, but more than that, it might just be the pop-punk album of the year." The album was listed as #12 in the magazine's Top 50 releases of 2017, given the review- "with 'Vacation' [Seaway] forged absolute pop-punk perfection. Featuring songs about falling in love, dealing with heartbreak and taking your dog for a walk on the beach, the band combined their passions for heart, positivity and boyband peppiness to make an album that is brimming with youthful innocence, and, more than anything, timeless songwriting. We'll vacation here for many summers to come."

From September to October 2017, Seaway joined Four Year Strong on their Rise or Die Trying anniversary tour through the United States. In November 2017, the band toured through Canada with fellow Oakville natives Silverstein. Seaway headlined their "Japanese Vacation" tour in December 2017 through Tokyo, Osaka, and Nagoya. The band headlined a sold-out Toronto "Holiday Shaker" in December 2017 with support from acts Like Pacific and others. In early 2018, Seaway headlined the U.K. with support from British band Woes and Pure Noise roster member Lizzy Farrall. On January 8, the band released a video for their single "London."

Seaway joined with Neck Deep on their USA Tour from late January to February 2018. In May 2018, Seaway supported Sum 41 on the Does This Look Infected? anniversary tour. In the summer of 2018, Seaway headlined a cross-Canada tour with support from Like Pacific, Bearings, and Living with Lions. On the festival route, Seaway played Festivoix in Trois-Rivières in June 2018, 77 Fest in Montreal, Big Slam in Calgary, and a Weezer cover set at Stranded Fest in Toronto in August 2018.

On June 1, 2018, tickets went on sale for Seaway's fall European tour with fellow Pure Noise label-mates State Champs. One week later, Seaway released an acoustic version of their song, Lula on the Beach. On July 30, 2018, it was announced that Seaway would be supporting Blink 182 at The Colosseum at Caesar's Casino in Windsor, Ontario. On March 14, 2019, a rarities compilation Fresh Produce was announced for release on April 19.

=== Big Vibe and inactivity (2020–2022) ===
In October 2020, the band released their fourth studio album entitled Big Vibe on Pure Noise Records. The COVID-19 pandemic prevented them from touring for it but they performed a handful of shows, including their annual "Holiday Shaker" event in December 2021 when COVID-19 restrictions began lifting in their home province of Ontario.

In August 2022, a compilation of Pure Noise Records bands performing covers titled Dead Formats Vol. 1 was released, which featured Seaway's cover of "I'm The One" by Descendents. After the release of their cover, the band appeared to have moved away from being active, with the remaining members moving on to new chapters.

== Musical style ==
Matt Collar of AllMusic described the band as making "exuberant punk-pop and emo-rock" music. Rock Sound described the band's sound as "Fast and classically melodic pop-punk" combined with a "distinct and unashamed pop sensibility". The band's lyrical themes include romance, grief, interpersonal relationships and errors.

== Side projects ==
Seaway is the side project to Locke, Taylor and Eichinger's hardcore punk band Rage Brigade. When Seaway took off, the projects flipped. Rage Brigade released the F.I.G.H.T.M.U.S.I.C. EP and singles "Slipping Away" and "Hard Love" in 2011.

== Accolades ==
Colour Blind was included at number 32 on Rock Sound's top 50 releases of 2015 list.

Seaway was included in Alternative Press' 14 Most Anticipated Albums for 2017.

Seaway's third full-length album Vacation was listed at number 12 of Rock Sound's top 50 releases of 2017.

== Band members ==
Final lineup

- Ryan Locke – lead vocals (2011–2022)
- Andrew Eichinger – guitar, backing vocals (2011–2022)
- Adam Shoji – bass guitar (2011–2022)
- Ken Taylor – drums, percussion (2011–2022)

Former

- Patrick Carleton – rhythm guitar, vocals (2011–2020)

== Discography ==
=== Studio albums ===
List of studio albums
Title	Album details
Hoser	Released: October 15, 2013; Label: Mutant League (MLR004); Format: CD, CS, DL, LP
Colour Blind	Released: October 23, 2015; Label: Pure Noise (PNE176); Format: CD, CS, DL, LP
Vacation	Released: September 15, 2017; Label: Pure Noise (PNE204); Format: CD, DL, LP
Big Vibe	Released: October 16, 2020; Label: Pure Noise (PNE290); Format: CD, DL, LP

=== Compilation albums ===
List of compilation albums
Title	Album details
Fresh Produce	Released: April 19, 2019; Label: Pure Noise; Format: CD, DL, LP

=== Extended plays ===
List of extended plays
Title	Album details
Seaway	Released: November 14, 2011; Label: Self-released; Format: DL
Seaway / Safe to Say	Released: October 23, 2012; Label: Mutant League; Format: DL, 7" vinyl
Clean Yourself Up	Released: April 2, 2013; Label: Self-released; Format: CS, DL
All in My Head	Released: November 4, 2014; Label: Pure Noise (PNE159); Format: CD, CS, DL, 7" vinyl

=== Singles ===
List of singles, showing year released and album name
Title	Year	Album
"Emily" (From First to Last cover)	2012	Non-album single
"Sabrina the Teenage Bitch"	2013	Seaway
"Freak"	2015	Colour Blind
"Best Mistake"	2015	Colour Blind
"Airhead"	2015	Colour Blind
"Growing Stale"	2015	Colour Blind
"Closer" (The Chainsmokers featuring Halsey cover)	2017	Punk Goes Pop Vol. 7
"Apartment"	2017	Vacation
"Something Wonderful"	2017	Vacation
"Curse Me Out"	2017	Vacation
"Lula on the Beach"	2017	Vacation
"London"	2017	Vacation
"Big Vibe"	2020	Big Vibe
"Mrs. David"	2020	Big Vibe

=== Other appearances ===
List of original multi-artist compilation appearances, with contribution, showing year released and album name
Title	Album details	Contribution
2016 Summer Sampler	Released: August 20, 2016; Label: New Damage; Format: Digital	"Hand in My Pocket" originally performed by Alanis Morissette
Punk Goes Pop Vol. 7	Released: July 14, 2017; Label: Fearless; Format: CD, Digital	"Closer" originally performed by The Chainsmokers featuring Halsey
Dead Formats (Volume 1)	Released: August 22, 2022; Label: Pure Noise; Format: CD, DL, LP	"I'm The One" originally performed by The Descendents
