= Why Would I Watch =

Studio album by Hot Mulligan
- Released: May 12, 2023
- Recorded: 2022
- Genre: Emo; pop punk; alternative rock; post-emo
- Length: 37:19
- Label: Wax Bodega
- Producer: Brett Romnes

Hot Mulligan chronology
You'll Be Fine (2020)	Why Would I Watch (2023)	The Sound a Body Makes When It's Still (2025)

Singles from Why Would I Watch
- 1. "Shhhh! Golf Is On" Released: March 9, 2023; 2. "Gans Media Retro Game" Released: April 12, 2023; 3. "No Shoes in the Coffee Shop (Or Socks)" Released: May 12, 2023

Professional ratings
Review scores
Source	Rating
Distorted Sound	8/10
Paste	8.1/10
Sputnikmusic	3.5/5 stars
Upset	4/5 stars

Why Would I Watch is the third studio album by Michigan emo band Hot Mulligan. It was released on May 12, 2023 through Wax Bodega.

== Track listing ==
Why Would I Watch track listing
No.	Title	Length
1.	"Shouldn't Have a Leg Hole But I Do"	1:44
2.	"It's a Family Movie She Hates Her Dad"	2:55
3.	"And I Smoke"	2:54
4.	"This Song is Called it's Called What's it Called"	4:16
5.	"No Shoes in the Coffee Shop (Or Socks)"	3:20
6.	"Christ Alive My Toe Dammit Hurts"	2:58
7.	"Betty"	2:09
8.	"Cock Party 2 (Better Than The First)"	3:44
9.	"Shhhh! Golf is On"	2:44
10.	"Gans Media Retro Games"	3:19
11.	"Smahccked My Head Awf"	3:09
12.	"John "The Rock" Cena, Can You Smell What the Undertaker"	4:07
Total length:		37:24
