= Vacation (Seaway album) =

Studio album by Seaway
- Released: September 15, 2017
- Studio: Mike Green's studio, West Alley
- Genre: Pop punk
- Length: 38:00
- Label: Pure Noise
- Producer: Mike Green, Kyle Black, Will McCoy

Seaway chronology
Colour Blind (2015)	Vacation (2017)	Big Vibe (2020)

Singles from Vacation
- 1. "Apartment" Released: July 13, 2017; 2. "Something Wonderful" Released: August 23, 2017; 3. "Lula on the Beach" Released: September 12, 2017; 4. "London" Released: January 6, 2018

Vacation is the third studio album by Canadian rock band Seaway and a follow-up to 2015's Colour Blind.

== Background and production ==
Pre-production was done with Derek Hoffman and Alan Day at Fox Studios, and by Mike Harmon at Wachusett Recording. Vacation was produced and engineered by Mike Green and Kyle Black at Green's studio, and by Will McCoy at West Alley Studios. Colin Schwanke, Fabian Rubio, and Jon Lundin acted as assistant engineers, and operated Pro Tools. Black mixed the recordings at West Alley.

== Composition ==
Of Vacation, Singer Ryan Locke said: "Vacation is a step in a new direction for us. While still holding onto familiar aspects of the band, we definitely explored new destinations for Seaway. It is the best music we’ve written thus far; the record we’ve been working towards for the last 4 years."

== Release ==
On July 13, 2017, it was reported that Seaway had signed to Dine Alone Records to handle the Canadian distribution for their next LP "Vacation". Album artwork, track listing and a music video for the first single "Apartment" was also released at this time. Vacation was released on September 14, 2017, the same day that the band played Riot Fest in Chicago. In September and October 2017, the group supported Four Year Strong for their 10th anniversary tour for Rise or Die Trying (2007).

== Reception ==
AllMusic wrote that the record is "effortlessly melodic and marked by a shiny, '90s alt-rock aesthetic, Seaway's third full-length album, 2017's Vacation, is a confidently executed production; the kind that grabs your attention from the start and never lets you turn away." Alternative Press wrote that Seaway "levelled up in the pop-punk world" and that the album contained "tracks so damn catchy you’ll be singing along upon first listen" giving the album 4.5/5 stars. Andy Biddulph from Rock Sound gave the album 8/10, saying "this is the moment Seaway become real contenders, but more than that, it might just be the pop-punk album of the year." The album was listed as #12 in the magazine's Top 50 releases of 2017, given the review- "with ‘Vacation’ [Seaway] forged absolute pop-punk perfection. Featuring songs about falling in love, dealing with heartbreak and taking your dog for a walk on the beach, the band combined their passions for heart, positivity and boyband peppiness to make an album that is brimming with youthful innocence, and, more than anything, timeless songwriting. We'll vacation here for many summers to come."

== Track listing ==
All music and lyrics written by Seaway, except "Something Wonderful" and "Day Player" by Seaway and Mike Green.

1. "Apartment" – 3:00
2. "Neurotic" – 3:22
3. "London" – 3:01
4. "Lula on the Beach" – 3:25
5. "Something Wonderful" – 2:58
6. "Curse Me Out" – 3:04
7. "Day Player" – 3:38
8. "Misery in You" – 3:17
9. "Scatter My Ashes Along the Coast, or Don't" – 3:16
10. "Car Seat Magazine" – 3:24
11. "40 Over" – 3:36
12. "When I Hang Up" – 2:51

== Personnel ==
Personnel per booklet.

Seaway

- Ryan Locke – lead vocals
- Patrick Carleton – guitar, backing vocals
- Andrew Eichinger – guitar
- Adam Shoji – bass
- Ken Taylor – drums

Additional musician

- Caleb Shomo – guest vocals on "Scatter My Ashes Along the Coast, or Don't"

Production

- Mike Green – producer, engineer
- Kyle Black – producer, engineer, mixing
- Will McCoy – producer, engineer
- Colin Schwanke – assistant engineer, Pro Tools
- Fabian Rubio – assistant engineer, Pro Tools
- Jon Lundin – assistant engineer, Pro Tools
- Derek Hoffman – pre-production
- Alan Day – pre-production
- Mike Harmon – pre-production
- Donny Phillips – illustrations, package design
