= Maybe This Place Is the Same and We're Just Changing =

Studio album by Real Friends
- Released: July 22, 2014
- Recorded: February 1–18, 2014, Always Be Genius Recording Studio, Crown Point, Indiana
- Genre: Pop punk; emo
- Length: 32:33
- Label: Fearless
- Producer: Seth Henderson

Real Friends chronology
Put Yourself Back Together (2013)	Maybe This Place Is the Same and We're Just Changing (2014)	The Home Inside My Head (2016)

Singles from Maybe This Place Is the Same and We're Just Changing
- 1. "Loose Ends" Released: May 20, 2014; 2. "Sixteen" Released: June 10, 2014; 3. "I Don't Love You Anymore" Released: July 1, 2014

Maybe This Place Is the Same and We're Just Changing is the debut studio album by American rock band Real Friends. The album was recorded in February 2014 with Seth Henderson at Always Be Genius Recording Studio. It was released through Fearless on July 22. The album charted at number 24 in the U.S. It also charted in the top 20 on several Billboard charts.

== Background ==
In the fall of 2010 bassist Kyle Fasel "wasn't happy" with the music he was working on and wished to start over. Fasel called guitarist Dave Knox and the pair soon started talking about the goals they wished to achieve. Fasel didn't expect it to lead anywhere. Vocalist Dan Lambton, who was friends with Knox, received a call from Fasel, asking if he would like to join him and Knox. They were soon joined by drummer Aaron Schuck. The group soon realized that it "didn't feel right [playing the songs they currently had]. [...] almost forc[ing] ourselves into [a] sound." They had a meeting and came to the conclusion to start over. During this period of change, Fasel and Knox were playing in The Fastest Kid Alive. Shortly afterwards, Schuck was replaced by Brian Blake. Blake had emailed the band after he found out they needed a drummer.

Real Friends didn't have a permanent second guitarist, often having their friends to substitute. Eric Haines soon joined as an additional guitarist. Until Haines joined Fasel and Knox would typically write the songs and they didn't have "another guitar[ist's] opinion", according to Fasel. With this new line-up the group released a few EPs. One of these was Everyone That Dragged You Here (2012). Shortly after the release of the EP, the band's popularity increased and the audience at their shows also increased. Another EP was Put Yourself Back Together (2013). Reviewing the EP for Rock Sound, Andy Biddulph said noted that he would not be "surprised" if the band was "mixing it with the big boys in a year's time". Fearless signed the band in December 2013. The band were initially hesitant to sign to a label but called Fearless "different. They made it feel more like a family." The group "still wanted full control of our band" while Fearless would help with marketing and distribution, according to Fasel.

== Composition and recording ==
The way that we wrote the album was the same as [previous releases] but we definitely had different motives. We wanted to grow in our sound and we wanted to have[...] a more mature sound. [...] We wanted to achieve a little more dynamic in our music and a little bit more variety in general.

– Kyle Fasel, about the way the band composed material for the album, 2014

Previously the band's fans have been constantly asking them when their debut album was coming out, but Fasel maintained the group "weren't ready" to do an album. Fasel hoped that the band could "deliver something that everyone can connect to". At this point, none of the band members listened to pop punk, unlike when the band started. Fasel listened to emo music while other members listened to "heavier stuff and hardcore." Whenever the group wrote a new song they would compare it to a past song, such as "Late Nights in My Car". The band felt under pressure while writing for the album but felt "happier and happier" as time progressed.

Fasel claimed the band "incorporated a lot more like, “emo” aspects and sometimes more “aggressive” aspects and sometimes “slower” aspects." As a result, Fasel was "a lot more nervous" what the reaction to this experimentation was going to be. All of the album's lyrics were written by Fasel. Originally, Fasel had kept the lyrics on his phone, which more than half of was accidentally deleted. The longer Fasel "thought about it I was just really glad that happened". On January 20, 2014, the band announced they had finished writing material for their debut album.

On February 1, the band started recording at Always Be Genius Recording Studio, located at Crown Point, Indiana, with Seth Henderson and on February 18, the band finished recording. (Note: Hednerson had previously worked with the band, recording their This Is Honesty (2011) and Everyone That Dragged You Here (2012) EPs.) Lambton recorded his vocals at the very end of the recording process due to respiratory illnesses. Joe Taylor of Knuckle Puck has guest vocals on "Cover You Up", while Chris Roetter of Like Moths to Flames has guest vocals on "Loose Ends". The album was mixed by Sean O' Keefe, with assistance from Rob Drauden in Chicago.

== Release ==
In March and April 2014, the group supported The Wonder Years on their North American headlining tour. On May 1, Real Friends announced their debut album, Maybe This Place Is the Same and We're Just Changing. The title is about change that is experienced when one leaves and returns home. Fasel said the group were "beyond excited" to unveil the album to their fans. Lambton said it's down to the listener "what this album means to you. [...] we took a lot of time putting together an album that we believe is a solid and progressive effort, and i hope that shines through". Following this, the band went on a tour of the UK and Europe in May alongside Modern Baseball and You Blew It!. On May 7, a music video was released for "Loose Ends", it features Chris Roetter of Like Moths to Flames. It was also released as a free download. The song was released as a single on May 20. The music video was filmed by Jered Scott of Several Guys and edited by Ken Wilcox of Twisted Iris. "Sixteen" was released as a single on June 10. The song was also made available for streaming and a lyric video was released the same day. The band played on the 2014 edition of Warped Tour. "I Don't Love You Anymore" was made available for streaming on June 30 via The A.V. Club and released as a single on July 1. A music video was released for the song on July 16, it was directed by Eric Teti.

Maybe This Place Is the Same and We're Just Changing was planned to be released prior to Warped Tour so that band could play the newer songs. Instead, the album was released on July 22 through Fearless. (Note: U.S. Fearless 301972) The album artwork and layout was done by Gary Weissmann at Creation Factory, (Note: Gary Weissmann has been doing design work for the band since their inception.) while Mitchell Wojcik contributed art direction and photography. A day later, the album was made available for streaming. In October and November, the band toured across the U.S. with Neck Deep, Cruel Hand and Have Mercy. The band were excited for this tour as they were able to play more songs off the album but also the way the tour showcases multiple genres. The group played a holiday show on December 27 at The Metro in Chicago. On January 13, 2015, a music video was released for "Summer", which was directed by Max Moore. In March, the band supported All Time Low in Europe, while in between those dates played a few headlining shows. In April and May, the band supported The Maine on The American Candy tour. On July 7, the band released the music video for "Sixteen". It was directed by Moore and was filmed at a bowling alley. The video tells the story of a teenager who celebrates his birthday without any guests. The band supported Every Time I Die on the Common Vision tour in July and August. In October and November, the group supported Mayday Parade on the 2015 Alternative Press Tour.

== Reception ==
Professional ratings
Review scores
Source	Rating
AllMusic	Favorable
AbsolutePunk	6.5/10 stars
Alternative Press	4.0/5 stars
Punknews.org	3.5/5 stars
Rock Sound	8/10

Prior to release, the album was included on Alternative Press's "Most Anticipated Albums in 2014" list and Fuse's "25 Most Anticipated 2014 Summer Albums" list. Maybe This Place Is the Same and We're Just Changing was a critical and commercial success. The album sold over 10,300 copies in its first week, charting at number 24 on the Billboard 200. The album was nominated for "Album of the Year" at the Alternative Press Music Awards, as well as "I Don't Love You Anymore" for "Best Song" and Fasel for "Best Bassist". "I Don't Love You Anymore" was included on Idobi Radio's "Top 40 of 2014" list. "Loose Ends" was included on Alternative Press' "The 18 best sing along moments of 2014" list. The album was included at number 10 on Rock Sound's "Top 50 Albums of the Year" list.

Reviewing the album for Rock Sound, Andy Biddulph noted that Lambton's vocals "capture what is to hurt, recover and then hurt again" on top of "some of the most relatable, original pop-punk this side of the millennium. Biddulph mentioned the album was full of "tasteful ballads and radio-ready pop-punk".

== Track listing ==
All songs written by Real Friends. All lyrics written by Kyle Fasel.

1. "Maybe This Place Is the Same..." – 1:04
2. "I Don't Love You Anymore" – 3:25
3. "Cover You Up" – 2:51
4. "Old Book" – 1:36
5. "Summer" – 3:21
6. "Loose Ends" – 3:03
7. "Short Song" – 1:38
8. "Sixteen" – 2:19
9. "Spread Me All Over Illinois" – 3:13
10. "To: My Old Self" – 3:19
11. "I Think I'm Moving Forward" – 2:45
12. "...And We're Just Changing" – 3:52

== Personnel ==
Personnel per booklet.

Real Friends

- Kyle Fasel – bass guitar
- Dave Knox – lead guitar
- Dan Lambton – vocals
- Brian Blake – drums
- Eric Haines – rhythm guitar

Additional musicians

- Joe Taylor – guest vocals on "Cover You Up"
- Chris Roetter – guest vocals on "Loose Ends"

Production

- Seth Henderson – recording, production, engineering
- Sean O' Keefe – mixing
- Rob Drauden – mixing assistant

Artwork

- Mitchell Wojcik – art direction, photography
- Gary Weissmann – album artwork, layout

== Chart positions ==
Chart (2014)	Peak position
U.S. Billboard 200	24
U.S. Billboard Alternative Albums	5
U.S. Billboard Independent Albums	3
U.S. Billboard Top Rock Albums	6
U.S. Billboard Vinyl Albums	3
