= The Heavy Hearts =

American alternative rock band

- Origin: Seattle, Washington
- Genres: Alternative rock, grunge, punk rock
- Years active: 2001-present
- Labels: The Swingline, Selector Sound
- Members: Brian Burnside, Denise Burnside (née Maupin), Slice Kraft, Lee Taylor

The Heavy Hearts are an alternative rock band from Seattle, Washington. The band consists of four members; guitarist and vocalist Brian Burnside, bassist and vocalist Denise Burnside, bassist Slice Kraft, and drummer Lee Taylor. Alternate bassist Dan Schwartz also played with The Heavy Hearts. The Heavy Hearts were founded in 2001 as Triple X Audio and were also known as XXX Audio before they obtained their current name. They changed their name to the Heavy Hearts in 2006, and released their self-titled debut EP later that year.

The band's two frontpeople are Brian Burnside and his wife Denise Burnside (née Maupin). Maupin is the daughter of Seattle City Councilman Will Maupin.

== Discography ==
=== As Triple X Audio ===
- Like Pumping Gas On Fire (Mattress Actress, 2003)
- Wreckage and Reclamation (Mattress Actress EP, 2006)

=== As The Heavy Hearts ===
- The Heavy Hearts (The Swingline EP, 2006)
- A Killer of Snakes (Selector Sound, 2008)
