= Copacetic (Knuckle Puck album) =

Studio album by Knuckle Puck
- Released: July 31, 2015
- Recorded: February 26–April 1, 2015; Always Be Genius Recording Studio
- Genres: Pop punk, emo
- Length: 40:47
- Label: Rise
- Producer: Seth Henderson

Knuckle Puck chronology
While I Stay Secluded (2014)	Copacetic (2015)	Shapeshifter (2017)

Singles from Copacetic
- 1. "Disdain" Released: July 6, 2015; 2. "True Contrite" Released: July 6, 2015

Copacetic is the 2015 debut album by American pop punk band Knuckle Puck. Following the independent release of several EPs, and after adding bassist Ryan Rumchaks to the band, Knuckle Puck began writing material for their debut album, and signed with American record label Rise Records in December, 2014. Copacetic was released on July 31, 2015. The album was recorded at Always Be Genius Recording Studio between February and April 2015, and produced by Seth Henderson. The album sold over 8,000 copies in the first week, charting at number 61 on the Billboard 200; it also charted in the top 20 on several other Billboard charts, and in the top 50 on several UK charts.

== Background ==
Knuckle Puck formed as a cover band in the fall of 2010 in the outskirts of Chicago. The band consisted of vocalist Joe Taylor, guitarist Kevin Maida and drummer John Siorek. Before the group started writing original songs in April 2011 with the addition of guitarist Nick Casasanto. Since a permanent bass player had not been found, the group had friends fill in on bass. The band released five EPs over the course of three years. Maida explained that the lyrical content in the EPs were about the band's "woes in life and what was bringing us down". In spring 2014 the band recruited bassist Ryan Rumchaks. In October, the band released the last of these EPs, titled While I Stay Secluded. Maida commented that the band had "firmly and confidently" considered the EP their best work so far. In November and December, the band supported Modern Baseball on their fall tour. On December 22, Knuckle Puck announced they had signed to Rise Records and planned to release their debut full-length album in summer 2015. Maida said that Rise would be "a bountiful new home" for them and would help them evolve.

== Production ==
In late 2014 the band started writing material for Copacetic. Maida claimed the band wanted their sound to "cross as many different paths as possible" without it bearing a predictable sound. The group tried "as many new and exciting things as possible" to expand their sound. Maida called the album "a definitive statement" for the band, "it's a new chapter and a new beginning." Maida explained that the material on Copacetic is about "a state of being content" as opposed to life struggles in previous EPs. Maida also said that some songs on the album refer to things that "bother us, but overall it's about saying, 'I'm fine. I'm alright'". "Disdain" is about difficulties with a long-distance relationship and "disdain one can develop for said distance." "Untitled" came about from the band attempting to mix the styles of 1990s emo bands, such as American Football and Mineral. Maida recalled that the track's extended outro was improvised in the studio after the band had finished recording the main song, stating that the section was an attempt at something similar to "Goodbye Sky Harbor" by Jimmy Eat World.

On February 26, the band announced they had started recording Copacetic, and it was completed on April 1. The album was produced by Seth Henderson at Always Be Genius Recording Studio. Henderson also mixed the album, while Kris Crummett mastered it.

On May 2, 2025, for the 10-year anniversary, Copacetic was remixed and remastered.

== Release ==
On June 11, 2015, Copacetic was announced along with its track list and artwork. The artwork was done by Ben Sears, who also provided design. On June 19, a music video was released for "Disdain". The video was directed by Max Moore. On June 30, "True Contrite" was made available for streaming. The band played on the 2015 edition of Warped Tour. On July 6, "Disdain" and "True Contrite" were released as singles. On July 14, "Pretense" was made available for streaming. On July 23, the album was made available for streaming. Copacetic was released on July 31 through Rise. (Note: U.S. Rise RISE 278-2) On August 10, a music video for "True Contrite" was released. The video features Casasanto's brother and was directed by Moore. The video was filmed twice: one with polaroids on the wall, and the other with nothing on the walls. Maida said the video was "one of the most painstaking, rewarding experiences ever". The band supported State Champs on their European tour in September and October. Knuckle Puck toured the U.S. in October and November, with support from Seaway, Head North and Sorority Noise.

On February 11, 2016, a music video was released for "Pretense". The video was directed by YEAH! Films and filmed in Canada a few weeks prior. In February and March, the band supported Neck Deep and State Champs on their co-headlining U.S. tour. In March and April, the band went on their first UK headlining tour with support from Seaway and Boston Manor. The band went on the 2016 edition of Warped Tour. From mid October to late November, the band supported The Wonder Years on their tour of the U.S. The band supported Real Friends on their tour of the UK in December 2016.

== Music ==
Timothy Monger of AllMusic described the album's sound as "a tuneful blend of classic pop-punk and emo that seemed right at home on the Rise Records label." Troy L. Smith of Cleveland.com said the album "embraces the traditional elements of pop-punk" and "expands upon them." Punknews.org stated that the album's style contains "subtle new bends in it but more or less sticks to their formula of old."

== Reception ==
Professional ratings
Review scores
Source	Rating
AbsolutePunk	8/10
AllMusic	Favorable
Blunt Magazine	3/5
Cleveland.com	B+
Punknews.org	3/5 stars
Rock Sound	8/10

=== Critical response ===
Reviewing the album for Rock Sound, Jack Rogers said it delivers "the sort of shirt tugging poignancy" the band are known for. Rogers mentioned that album shows off "their emotionally dented style" beating their peers. Overall, he noted that they "invested every ounce" of themselves to create a "damn fine pop-punk debut." Cleveland.com reviewer Troy L. Smith noted that people who liked early 2000s pop punk albums such as Simple Plan's No Pads, No Helmets...Just Balls (2002) and New Found Glory's Sticks and Stones (2002) would enjoy Copacetic. Smith wrote that Taylor's vocals was "a nice change of pace" compared to pop punk's typical "whiny vocals". Smith ended with making mention of the band taking risks, such as the eight-minute closing track "Untitled". AllMusic reviewer Timothy Monger noted the album's sound "[r]anging from blazing, epic emo and pop-punk to slower, more contemplative fare."

Punknews.org staff member RENALDO69 wrote that the album had "subtle new bends in it" but kept to the band's sound of their EPs. RENALDO69 clarified that although this wasn't "a bad thing", the album was weighed down by "too much cookie-cutter and filler". They mentioned that the band leaned towards a "more pop side of the punk spectrum", resulting in the album sounding "a bit stagnant." AbsolutePunk reviewer Blake Solomon wrote that the group's sound had matured, providing "instrumental denouements" and "actually interesting" slow-paced songs. He noted that album did "an admirable job recreating the peaks and valleys of sorrow." Solomon mentioned how pop punk was a genre that references the past, while closing with the album being "just as interested in our uncertain futures."

=== Commercial performance and accolades ===
Copacetic sold 8,482 copies in the first week, charting in the U.S. at number 61 on the Billboard 200. The album also charted at number 3 on the Hard Rock Albums chart, number 4 on both the Alternative Albums and Top Internet Albums charts, number 5 on the Independent Albums chart, and number 6 on the Top Rock Albums and Vinyl Albums charts. The album charted in the UK at number 12 on the Independent Album Breakers chart, number 28 on the Rock & Metal Albums chart, and number 47 on the Independent Albums chart.

Copacetic was included at number 9 on Rock Sound's top 50 releases of 2015 list. It was also nominated for Album Of The Year at the 2016 Alternative Press Music Awards. Cleveland.com ranked "Disdain" at number 87 on their list of the top 100 pop-punk songs.

== Track listing ==
All tracks written by Knuckle Puck.

No.	Title	Length
1.	"Wall to Wall (Depreciation)"	2:18
2.	"Disdain"	2:44
3.	"Poison Pen Letter"	3:39
4.	"Swing"	3:43
5.	"Ponder"	2:10
6.	"Evergreen"	3:28
7.	"True Contrite"	4:55
8.	"Stationary"	2:05
9.	"In Your Crosshairs"	4:42
10.	"Pretense"	3:05
11.	"Untitled"	7:51
Total length:		40:47

== Personnel ==
Personnel per booklet.

Knuckle Puck

- Nick Casasanto – rhythm guitar, co-lead vocals
- Kevin Maida – lead guitar
- Ryan Rumchaks – bass, backing vocals
- John Siorek – drums
- Joe Taylor – lead vocals
- Dan Lambton - (Guest vocals on Evergreen)

Production

- Seth Henderson – producer, mixing
- Ben Sears – art, design
- Kris Crummett – mastering

== Chart performance ==
Chart (2015)	Peak position
UK Independent Albums	47
UK Independent Album Breakers	12
UK Rock & Metal Albums	28
U.S. Billboard 200	61
U.S. Billboard Alternative Albums	4
U.S. Billboard Hard Rock Albums	3
U.S. Billboard Independent Albums	5
U.S. Billboard Top Internet Albums	4
U.S. Billboard Top Rock Albums	6
U.S. Billboard Vinyl Albums	13
