= 20/20 (Knuckle Puck album) =

Studio album by Knuckle Puck
- Released: September 18, 2020
- Length: 34:33
- Label: Rise

Knuckle Puck chronology
| Shapeshifter (2017) | 20/20 (2020) | Losing What We Love (2023) |

20/20 is the third studio album by American pop-punk band Knuckle Puck. It was released on September 18, 2020 through Rise Records.

== Background ==
Knuckle Puck released their second studio album Shapeshifter in October 2017. It was promoted with a headlining tour of the United States and the United Kingdom, appearances at the Slam Dunk Festival in the UK and the Warped Tour in the US, and a supporting slot for Good Charlotte in the US through to late 2018. In 2019, the band made sporadic performances, including a co-headlining tour of the US with Citizen in May and June, and a performance at the Four Chord Music Festival later in the year.

== Release ==
Knuckle Puck embarked on a US tour in early 2020, marking their first tour since mid-2019, but was halted after a few weeks because of the COVID-19 pandemic. On February 21, 2020, "Tune You Out" was made available for streaming, alongside a lyric video. This was followed by "RSVP" on April 21, 2020; 20/20 was announced for release later in the year. They were announced to appear at Slam Dunk Festival in mid-2020, but did not feature on the line-up when it was rescheduled as a result of COVID-19. A music video was released for "Breathe" on June 18, 2020. Coinciding with this, 20/20 was given a release date in three months' time. Following this, a lyric video was posted online for "What Took You So Long?" at the end of July 2020. They were announce to support New Found Glory and Simple Plan on their co-headlining tour in mid-2020, until it was also postponed till late 2021 due to COVID-19, though they eventually dropped off before it was underway.

== Personnel ==
- Joe Taylor – lead vocals
- Nick Casasanto – rhythm guitar, co-lead vocals
- Kevin Maida – lead guitar
- Ryan Rumchaks – bass, backing vocals
- John Siorek – drums

== Reception ==
Professional ratings
Review scores
| Source | Rating |
|---|---|
| AllMusic | 4.5/5 stars |
| Exclaim! | 8/10 |
| Kerrang! | 3/5 |
| Upset | 4/5 stars |

20/20 peaked at number 38 on Billboard Top Album Sales and number 19 on Vinyl Albums charts. Alternative Press included the album on their list of the year's best rock releases.

== Track listing ==
1. "20/20" – 3:13
2. "Tune You Out" – 2:58
3. "Sidechain" – 3:05
4. "Earthquake" – 3:26
5. "RSVP" – 2:53
6. "Breathe" (featuring Derek Sanders) – 2:58
7. "What Took You So Long?" – 2:38
8. "Into the Blue" – 3:16
9. "Green Eyes (Polarized)" – 3:05
10. "True North" – 3:37
11. "Miles Away" – 3:23

== Charts ==
Chart performance for 20/20
| Chart (2020) | Peak position |
|---|---|
| US Top Album Sales (Billboard) | 38 |
| US Vinyl Albums (Billboard) | 19 |
