= With Confidence =

Australian pop punk band

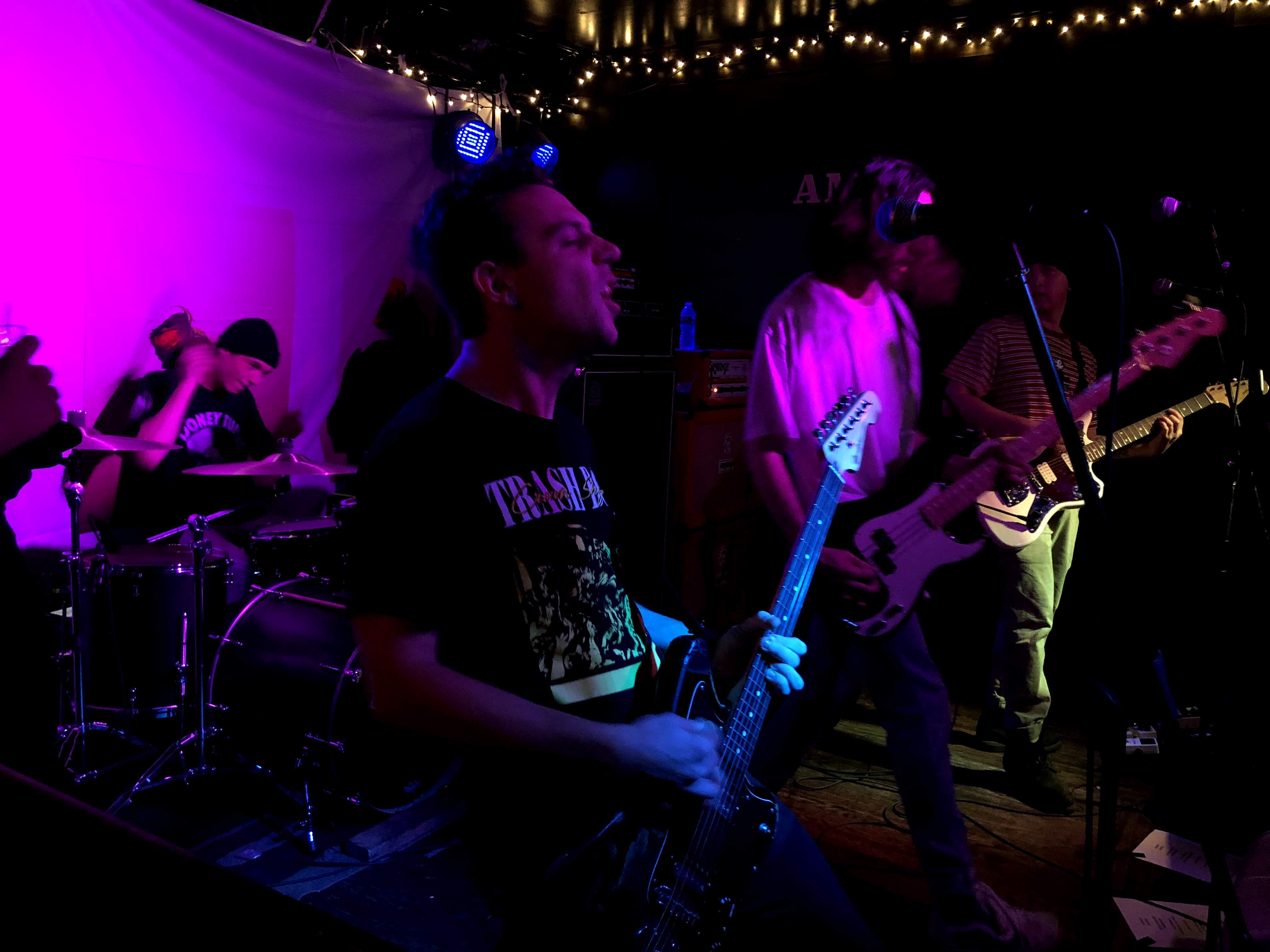
- With Confidence performing a concert at Amityville Music Hall in Amityville, NY.

Background information
- Origin: Sydney, New South Wales, Australia
- Genres: Pop punk
- Years active: 2012–2022
- Label: Hopeless Records
- Members: Jayden Seeley; Joshua Brozzesi; Inigo Del Carmen; Scotty Mclaughlin
- Past members: Samuel Haynes; Luke Rockets
- Website: withconfidencemusic.com

With Confidence was an Australian pop punk band from Sydney, active from 2012 until their disbandment in 2022. The band’s last line up consisted of lead vocalist/bassist Jayden Seeley, guitarist/backing vocalist Inigo Del Carmen, drummer Joshua Brozzesi and guitarist Scotty Mac.

== History ==
=== 2012–15: Formation and early EPs ===
With Confidence formed in mid-2012 with Jayden Seeley, Josh Brozzesi, and Samuel Haynes, who had all attended high school together. Shortly thereafter, member Inigo Del Carmen joined, and the four began posting videos on YouTube where they released their debut single "Stand Again" for free download on 27 April 2013. The band then released their debut EP Youth independently on 1 July 2013, and saw reasonable success, receiving national radio-play on Australian stations 2Day FM and Triple J. Alongside the Youth EP release, With Confidence played their first Australian tour supporting The Never Ever. The band went on to play local supports for 5 Seconds of Summer, The Getaway Plan, and The Red Jumpsuit Apparatus, continuing to build a following.

On 8 January 2014, guitarist Samuel Haynes was announced as no longer being a part of With Confidence. The band continued writing as a three-piece and on 31 March released the new single and debut music video "I Will Never Wait". They supported this release with their first national headline tour in April, selling out multiple shows including Sydney's "The Lair" (The Metro Theatre). On 3 September, the band returned to four-piece status when previously touring guitarist Luke Rockets was announced as an official member. They continued keeping the year busy touring and supporting the likes of You Me at Six, Tonight Alive, Marianas Trench, The Maine, and Kids in Glass Houses. The band released their second EP Distance on 13 January 2015. This was shortly followed by their second headlining tour, again selling out multiple venues throughout Australia.

=== 2016–17: Hopeless Records and Better Weather ===
On 4 January 2016 the band announced they had signed to American independent record label Hopeless Records. They coincided this news with new single and music video "We'll Be Okay". Following this the band announced an Australian headline tour set to take place in April, with support from Harbours. On 5 April they released their new single "Keeper" along with the announcement that their debut album Better Weather was going to be released on 17 June worldwide. Following their Australian headline tour, the band travelled to Japan to tour with The Wonder Years, ROAM & Cautioners. Directly after the Japanese tour, With Confidence travelled to the UK to support As It Is alongside American band Jule Vera. After the UK tour the band voyaged across to the US to appear on the entirety of the Vans Warped Tour.

On 21 July, the band released a music video for their Harry Potter-referencing song "Voldemort". Bassist Jayden Seeley said at the time that "“’Fear of a name only increases fear of the thing itself.’ Voldemort is my personification of mental illness and this song is a big, happy and carefree fuck you to Voldemort.“" On 17 October, the band announced they were releasing two new versions of the songs. One would be an acoustic version and the other features John Floreani of Trophy Eyes. The songs were released on 18 October.

Upon returning to Australia the band were on the road almost immediately again, supporting Motion City Soundtrack & 5 Seconds of Summer before heading out on their own album tour in October to celebrate the album that charted at #22 on the ARIA Charts. In December, it was announced they would be a part of Kerrang!'s American Superhits Green Day Tribute CD, covering "Wake Me Up When September Ends".

In February 2017, the band headlined a tour in the UK and Europe, with support from Milestones, Broadside, and Safe To Say. In April, they embarked on tour in the US to support State Champs, along with Don Broco and Against the Current. In May, they returned to the UK for a co-headlining tour with Set It Off.

In November 2017, the band put out a statement that they had parted ways with lead guitarist, Luke Rockets, after alleged sexual misconduct. The band subsequently dropped the remaining dates of their US tour.

=== 2018-2021: Love and Loathing and line-up change ===
Following their break from touring With Confidence announced a late February return show at the Chain Reaction in Anaheim, shortly followed by the announcement of their spot on Warped Tour 2018. They announced their second studio album Love and Loathing on 11 June shortly before their run on Warped Tour, along with its lead single "That Something". On 17 July, the band released their second single, "Jaded" along with a music video. The album was released on 10 August 2018.

In 2019, With Confidence released a cover of Train's "Drops of Jupiter" as part of the Hopeless Records Songs That Saved My Life, Vol 2 compilation. Drummer Josh Brozessi says the band made a playlist of songs from the 90s and 2000s before choosing Train's hit as their cover after "a few rehearsals." They chose "Drops of Jupiter" over songs like Third Eye Blind's "Jumper" and New Radicals' "Get What You Give."

On 26 March 2021, the band announced via Instagram the addition of guitarist Scotty Mac.

=== 2022: Tours and Breakup ===
From May to June 2022, With Confidence supported Stand Atlantic on their F.E.A.R. World Tour. Later that fall, the band joined Real Friends on their North American tour. Ahead of the tour's start, the band announced on social media that they were to break up after the tour and a small run of shows in Australia.

== Style and influences ==
AllMusic biographer Neil Z. Yeung wrote that the band "carries the blink-182 torch of pop-punk."

With Confidence have cited influences from bands the Dangerous Summer, Kings of Leon, Blink-182, the Wonder Years, the Strokes, and La Dispute on their Facebook. Along with Blink-182, All Time Low, Red Hot Chili Peppers, and the Dangerous Summer mentioned in their interview with Beers with the Band on YouTube.

The band uses mental health as theme throughout their debut album, as shown in songs such as "Voldemort".

== Members ==
Final lineup

- Jayden Seeley – lead vocals, bass, keyboards, additional guitar (2012–2022)
- Joshua Brozzesi – drums, percussion (2012–2022)
- Inigo Del Carmen – rhythm guitar, backing vocals (2012–2022), lead guitar (2014, 2017–2022)
- Scotty Mac – lead guitar, backing vocals (2021–2022; touring 2018–2021)

Former

- Samuel Haynes – lead guitar (2012–2014)
- Luke Rockets – lead guitar (2014–2017; touring 2014)

Timeline

== Discography ==
Studio albums

Title	Album details	Peak chart positions	
Title	Album details	AUS	US
Better Weather	Released: 17 June 2016; Label: Hopeless (HR2259); Producer: Stevie Knight; Mix Engineer: Kyle Black; Format: CD, DL, LP	22	—
Love and Loathing	Released: 10 August 2018; Label: Hopeless; Producer: Mike Green; Format: CD, DL, LP	—	97
With Confidence	Released: 27 August 2021; Label: Hopeless; Producer: Stevie Knight; Mix Engineer: James Paul Wisner; Format: CD, DL, LP	—	—
"—" denotes releases that did not chart or were not released in that territory.

Extended plays

Title	Album details
Youth	Released: 1 July 2013; Label: Self-released; Producer: Stevie Knight; Format: DL
Distance	Released: 13 January 2015; Label: Self-released; Producer: Stevie Knight; Format: DL

Singles

Title	Year	Album
"We'll Be Okay"	2016	Better Weather
"Keeper"	2016	Better Weather
"Voldemort"	2016	Better Weather
"That Something"	2018	Love and Loathing
"Jaded"	2018	Love and Loathing
"Moving Boxes"	2018	Love and Loathing
"Icarus"	2019	Love and Loathing
"Pâquerette (Without Me)"	2019	Love and Loathing
"Drops Of Jupiter"	2019	Songs That Saved My Life Vol 2.

Music videos

Title	Year	Director(s)
"I Will Never Wait"	2014	
"London Lights"	2015	
"Take Me Away"	2015	
"We'll Be Okay"	2016	
"Keeper"	2016	
"Voldemort"	2016	Justin Giritlian and Nathan Sam
"Long Night"	2017	Megan Thompson
"Archers"	2017	Brandon Lung
"Waterfall"	2017	Lewis Cater
"That Something"	2018	Megan Thompson
"Jaded"	2018	Amber Paredes
"Moving Boxes"	2018	Tyler Zelinsky
"Icarus"	2019	Lauren Meyering
"Pâquerette (Without Me)"	2019	Tim Toda
"Drops Of Jupiter"	2019	BRAVERIJAH
"Big Cat Judgement Day"	2021	
"Cult"	2021	Jose Iñigo Del Carmen
"Anything"	2021	Kiril Palaveev
"Paper"	2021	Stephanie O'Byrne
"What You Make It"	2021	
