= Hot Mulligan =

American emo band

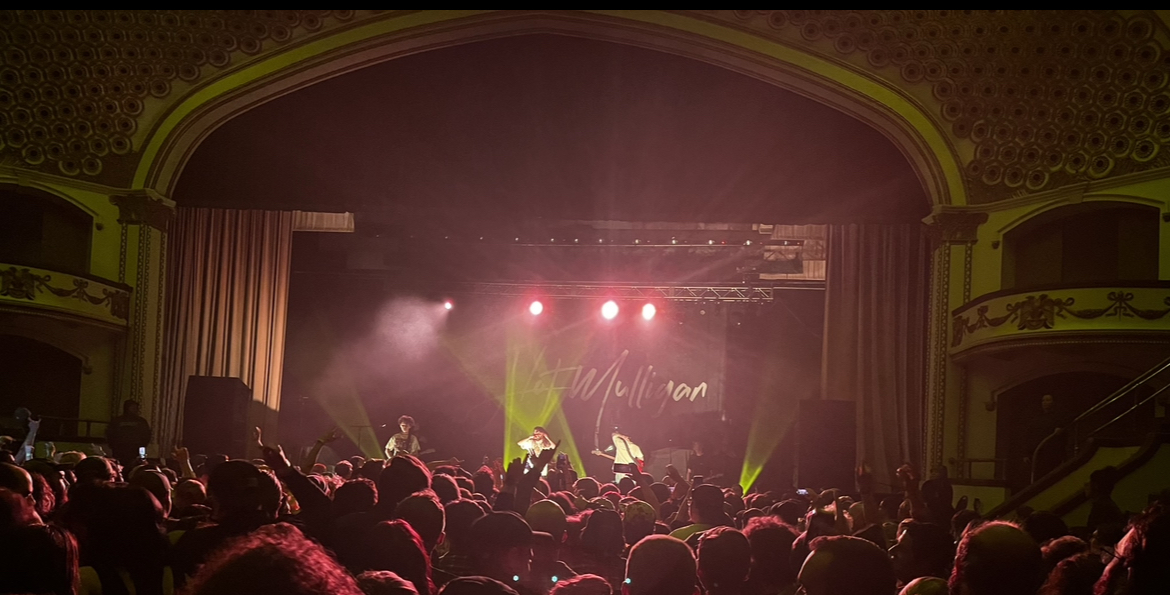
- Hot Mulligan performing in Columbus, Ohio at the Athenaeum Theatre on March 17, 2023

Background information
- Origin: Lansing, Michigan, U.S.
- Genres: Emo; pop punk; post hardcore; midwest emo
- Years active: 2014–present
- Labels: Save Your Generation Records; No Sleep Records; Wax Bodega
- Members: Nathan "Tades" Sanville; Chris Freeman; Ryan "Spicy" Malicsi; Brandon Blakeley; Jonah Kramer
- Past members: Brett Annelin; Montana Svoboda; Dylan Bowie; Brendan Lambert; Garrett "Sniff" Willig
- Website: hotmulligan.band

Hot Mulligan is an American emo band from Lansing, Michigan. The band currently consists of lead vocalist Nathan "Tades" Sanville, rhythm guitarist and vocalist Chris Freeman, lead guitarist Ryan Malicsi, bassist Jonah Kramer, and drummer Brandon Blakeley.

== History ==
In 2015, Hot Mulligan released two EPs titled Fenton and Honest & Cunning via Michigan-based label Save Your Generation Records. After signing to No Sleep Records in 2017, Hot Mulligan re-released an EP titled Opportunities (original release on Save Your Generation). In 2018, Hot Mulligan released their debut full-length album titled Pilot on No Sleep Records. In 2020, they released their second album, You’ll Be Fine, also on No Sleep. In 2023, Hot Mulligan signed to Wax Bodega and released their third album, Why Would I Watch. In 2024, touring bassist Jonah Kramer officially joined Hot Mulligan as a full-time member. The band also released the EP Warmer Weather, which had the singles Stickers of Brian and End Eric Sparrow and The Life of Him.

In June 2025, the band announced their fourth album, titled The Sound a Body Makes When It's Still, which released on August 22. The band also made a song for AEW professional wrestler Kyle Fletcher titled Prototheme.

== Band members ==
Current

- Nathan "Tades" Sanville – lead vocals (2014–present)
- Chris Freeman – rhythm guitar, co-lead vocals (2015–present), keyboards (2025–present), drums (2014–2015)
- Ryan "Spicy" Malicsi – lead guitar (2016–present)keyboards (2018–2020)
- Brandon Blakeley – drums (2016–present)
- Jonah “Fantasy Camp” Kramer – bass (2024–present, touring 2022–2024)

Former

- Brett Annelin – lead guitar (2014–2015)
- Montana Svoboda – bass (2014–2015)
- Dylan Bowie – rhythm guitar, backing vocals (2014–2016)
- Brendan Lambert – drums (2015–2016)
- Garrett "Sniff" Willig – bass (2016–2021)

Former Touring Members

- David Daignault – bass (2021–2022)

== Discography ==
=== Studio albums ===
- Pilot (2018), No Sleep Records
- You'll Be Fine (2020), No Sleep Records
- Why Would I Watch (2023), Wax Bodega
- The Sound a Body Makes When It's Still (2025), Wax Bodega

=== Compilation albums ===
- SYG Years (2018), Save Your Generation Records

=== EPs ===
- Fenton (2014), self-released, 2015 re-released on Save Your Generation Records
- Honest & Cunning (2015), Save Your Generation Records
- Split 7" w/ Everyone Leaves (2016), Save Your Generation Records
- Opportunities (2016), Save Your Generation Records, re-released/remastered in 2017 on No Sleep Records
- I Won't Reach Out to You (2021), Wax Bodega
- Acoustic Vol. 1 (2021), Wax Bodega
- Acoustic Vol. 2 (2022), Wax Bodega
- Hot Mulligan Lofi (2023), Wax Bodega
- Warmer Weather (2024), Wax Bodega

=== Singles ===
List of singles, showing year released and album name
Title	Year	Album
"I Fell in Love with Princess Peach"	2017	Non-album single
"All You Wanted by Michelle Branch"	2018	Pilot
"How Do You Know It's Not Armadillo Shells?"	2018	Pilot
"The Soundtrack to Missing a Slam Dunk"	2018	Pilot
"Feal Like Crab"	2020	You'll Be Fine
"Bleed American"	2021	Non-album single
"Drink Milk and Run"	2022	Non-album single
"Shhhh! Golf Is On"	2023	Why Would I Watch
"Gans Media Retro Games"	2023	Why Would I Watch
"Shhhh! Golf Is On (Lofi)"	2023	Hot Mulligan Lofi
"No Shoes in the Coffee Shop (Or Socks) [Lofi]"	2023	Hot Mulligan Lofi
"Stickers of Brian"	2024	Warmer Weather
"End Eric Sparrow and the Life of Him"	2024	Warmer Weather
"Fly Move (The Whole Time)"	2024	Warmer Weather
"And a Big Load"	2025	The Sound a Body Makes When It's Still
"Prototheme"	2025	Non-album single
"Island in the Sun"	2025	The Sound a Body Makes When It's Still
"I Don’t Think It’s the Right Time for Emojis"	2026	Non-album single
