= This Wild Life =

American acoustic rock duo

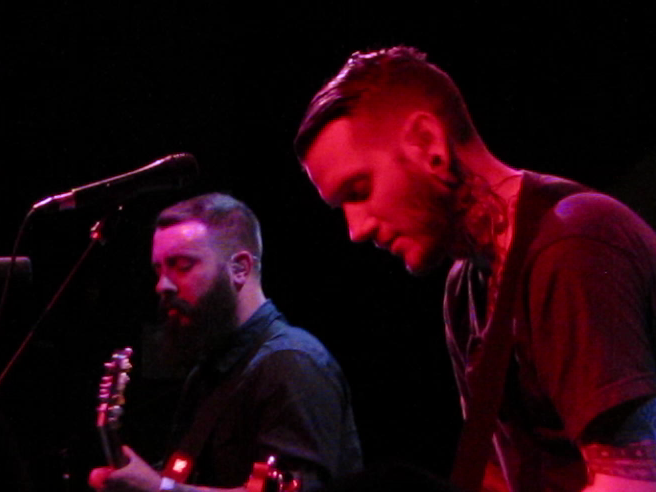
- This Wild Life's Kevin Jordan and Anthony Del Grosso performing at Assembly Music Hall in Sacramento, California on January 26, 2014

Background information
- Origin: Long Beach, California, U.S.
- Genres: Emo; acoustic rock; pop rock; pop punk
- Years active: 2010–present
- Labels: Epitaph Records
- Spinoff of: The Messenger
- Members: Kevin Jordan; Anthony Del Grosso
- Past members: Mikey Hoefnagel; Alex Bemis; Ramsey Badawi
- Website: thiswildlifeband.com

This Wild Life is an acoustic rock duo from Long Beach, California consisting of Kevin Jordan on vocals and guitar and Anthony Del Grosso on guitar. Jordan and Del Grosso were originally pianist and drummers, respectively.

== History ==
Formed in December 2010, This Wild Life began as a pop punk band with former members of the band The Messenger, which disbanded in July 2010. On May 7, 2013, it was announced that they would be recording with Copeland's Aaron Marsh. The change from a full band to an acoustic duo was because there was more attention to their acoustic songs, and Kevin Jordan found acoustic songs easier on his vocals. Although it was a difficult decision, the change opened them up to new opportunities.

On August 23, 2013, This Wild Life became part of The Artery Foundation. They were also added to Dave Shapiro's roster at The Agency Group, alongside other musicians such as A Day to Remember, Falling in Reverse, Pierce the Veil, Sleeping with Sirens, and The Wonder Years. Dave Shapiro is the vice president of The Agency Group and co-founder of the Scream It Like You Mean It Tour.

On April 4, 2014, it was announced that This Wild Life was signed to Epitaph Records and will release their first full-length album, "Clouded" on May 27, 2014, with the song "History" being the first single. "Clouded" was recorded with Aaron Marsh of Copeland.

This Wild Life performed "Roots and Branches" live on Episode 2 of Season 10 of The Bachelorette in a private concert at Santa Anita Park for Andi Dorfman and Chris Soules.

=== Tours ===
This Wild Life performed at Vans Warped Tour 2011 on August 10, 2011, and at Warped Tour 2012 on June 21, 2012, respectively. They appeared at Vans Warped Tour 2014. In 2013 and 2014, This Wild Life toured with Emery. In 2014, they headlined their first tour in UK. In May 2014 they toured Australia for the first time in support of Jonny Craig and his band Slaves. In February–March 2015, they played at Soundwave in Australia. On March 7, 2015, they performed at the Self Help Music Festival in San Bernardino, California. In 2015, they appeared on the Vans Warped Tour 2015, once again. In fall 2015, This Wild Life toured alongside Mayday Parade, Real Friends, and As It Is on the AP Tour.

== Albums ==
=== Clouded ===
Alt Press rated their album Clouded 4.5 out of 5 stars. Substream Magazine's review stated, "The intricacies of the melodies on Clouded will grab people's attentions, but the highly relatable aspect of the songs on this album will endear This Wild Life to anyone who listens. Clouded is one of the more unique albums to be released in awhile and is a strong release from one of the best up-and-coming bands." The first single is "Over It". The music video for "Over It" was directed by Benjamin Designer and released on May 21, 2014, starring actors Allison Paige and Zach Silverman.

=== Low Tides ===
Low Tides is This Wild Life's follow-up to their Epitaph debut album Clouded. Anthony Del Grosso and Kevin Jordan recorded Low Tides with producer/engineer Aaron Marsh of Copeland and it was released on September 9, 2016. On July 12, 2016, it was announced on This Wild Life's/Kevin's & Anthony's social media accounts that a new album which is the band's second studio full-length will be released on September 9 of that year. On the same day This Wild Life also release a new song called "Pull Me Out" on their YouTube channel.

=== Petaluma ===
On May 2, 2018, This Wild Life and both band members Kevin Jordan and Anthony Del Grosso announced on their social media accounts that they will be releasing a new album titled Petaluma. Kevin Jordan has said that "this album is the first record we made with a clear vision before the first song was ever written. Something with the dynamics and emotion we've always strived for, but within the bounds of a bright, warm, and organic sonic energy flowing through it." Along with the announcement of the release of the new album, This Wild Life also released a single called "Westside". Kevin Jordan stated that "'Westside' is a song I've wanted to write for many years but never knew how, since its inspiration isn't my story to tell. Sexual assault isn't something many people are comfortable talking about, and my perspective in the song is from a person supporting a loved one who's experienced it." Petaluma was released on June 22, 2018, in both the United States and Europe.

=== Ever Blossom ===
On October 15, 2021, This Wild Life released the album titled 'Ever Blossom.' This album featured 5 singles; 'Nothing Hurts Like Love For The First Time,' 'You Swore Your Love Would Burn,' 'If It's Cool With You I'm Cool With Being Through,' 'I Don't Love You Like I Want To,' and 'Still Wondering Why You Left Me Behind' all of which had their own music videos.

=== Never Fade ===
On June 23, 2023, This Wild Life released their most recent album titled 'Never Fade.'

== Reception ==
On July 27, 2013, This Wild Life uploaded a cover of Bring Me the Horizon's "Sleepwalking" onto their YouTube channel. On November 13, 2013, UCLA Radio interviewed Kevin Jordan, and it was revealed that Oliver Sykes liked the cover, and Bring Me the Horizon planned to add the cover to a bonus remix CD for their Sempiternal album that would only be available at Hot Topic. Epitaph Records announced the remix CD on December 15, 2013. On September 24, 2013, Vans Warped Tour founder, Kevin Lyman, also described how he enjoyed the band. Warped Tour sponsor, Alternative Press, featured This Wild Life in the "AP&R" section of its October 2013 (#304) issue, in the "100 Bands You Need to Know in 2014" section of its April 2014 (#309) issue, and in the "AP Recommends" section of its June 2014 issue (#312). Discovered Magazine also featured the band in their January 2014 (#18) issue.

== Members ==
Current members

- Kevin Jordan – lead vocals, rhythm guitar (2010–present)
- Anthony Del Grosso – lead guitar, backing vocals (2013–present); drums, percussion (2010–present)

Former members

- Alex Bemis – bass guitar, backing vocals (2012–2013)
- Mikey Hoefnagel – lead guitar (2010–2013)
- Ramsey Badawi – bass guitar, backing vocals (2010–2012)

- Herber Aviles - Compositor (2013–2015)

== Discography ==
- Pop Shove It (EP, 2011)
- Heart Flip (EP, 2012)
- Clouded (2014)
- Low Tides (2016)
- Petaluma (2018)
- Ever Blossom (2021)
- Never Fade (2023)
