= Real Friends (band) =

American rock band

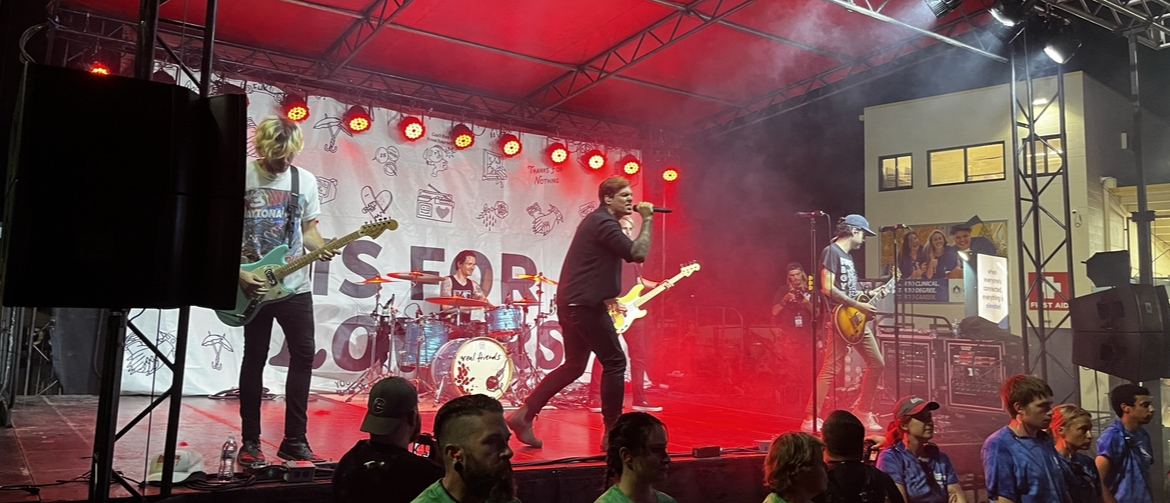
- Real Friends performing at Ohio is for Lovers in September 2022

Background information
- Origin: Tinley Park, Illinois, U.S.
- Genres: Pop punk; emo pop; alternative rock; pop rock
- Years active: 2010–present
- Labels: Fearless; Pure Noise; Midwest Trash
- Spinoff of: The Fastest Kid Alive
- Members: Kyle Fasel; Dave Knox; Eric Haines; Brian Blake
- Past members: Aaron Schuck; Dan Lambton; Cody Muraro
- Website: realfriends.band

Real Friends is an American rock band from Tinley Park, Illinois. To date, the band has released seven EPs and four studio albums. Previously signed to Fearless Records and Pure Noise Records, the band independently released their most recent full-length album, Blue Hour, on October 11, 2024.

== History ==
=== Formation and EPs (2010–13) ===
In the fall of 2010 bassist Kyle Fasel "wasn't happy" with the music he was working on and wished to start over. Fasel called lead guitarist Dave Knox and the pair soon started talking about the goals they wished to achieve. Fasel didn't expect it to lead anywhere. Vocalist Dan Lambton, who was friends with Knox, received a call from Fasel, asking if he would like to join him and Knox. They were soon joined by drummer Aaron Schuck. The band recorded its debut EP, This Is Honesty, in the spring of 2011. Following the release of the EP, the band began playing shows around the Midwest. The group soon realized that it "didn't feel right [playing the songs they currently had]. [...] almost forc[ing] ourselves into [a] sound." They had a meeting and came to the conclusion to start over. During this period, Fasel and Knox were playing in the Fastest Kid Alive. Shortly afterwards, Schuck was replaced by Brian Blake. Blake had emailed the band after he found out they needed a drummer.

Real Friends didn't have a permanent second guitarist, often having their friends to substitute. Eric Haines soon joined as rhythm guitarist. Until Haines joined, Fasel and Knox would typically write the songs, and, according to Fasel, they didn't have "another guitar[ist's] opinion". Shortly after the release of the Everyone That Dragged You Here EP, the band's popularity and the audience at their shows increased. The band later released the Put Yourself Back Together EP. Reviewing the EP for Rock Sound, Andy Biddulph noted that he would not be "surprised" if the band was "mixing it with the big boys in a year's time". In November, the group supported the Wonder Years on their UK shows, including UK Warped Tour.

=== Maybe This Place Is the Same and We're Just Changing (2013–15) ===
Fearless signed the band in December 2013. The band were initially hesitant to sign to a label, but called Fearless "different. They made it feel more like a family." The group "still wanted full control of our band" while Fearless would help with marketing and distribution, according to Fasel. The band recorded their debut studio album in February with producer Seth Henderson. The band released their debut album, Maybe This Place Is the Same and We're Just Changing, on July 22, 2014. The album sold over 10,300 copies, charting at number 24 on the Billboard 200. The band played on the 2014 Vans Warped Tour supporting the album's release, appearing on the Journey's Stage. They released an EP, More Acoustic Songs, for Record Store Day in April 2015, including an acoustic version of "Late Nights in My Car" featuring Kevin Jordan from This Wild Life.

=== The Home Inside My Head (2015–2017) ===
Throughout 2015, the band made several references to recording a new album on their Facebook and Twitter pages. Fearless Records announced that a new Real Friends record would be released in 2016, through a tweet on December 22, 2015. Real Friends finished recording the album on the road in February 2016. During their tour, the band played a new song entitled "Colder Quicker". On April 1, 2016, the band announced that the title of the new album was The Home Inside My Head, along with the album's release date, cover art, and track listing, as well as a music video for "Colder Quicker". The album was released on May 27, 2016.

=== Composure and departure of Dan Lambton (2017–2020) ===
On November 16, 2017, the band released a single entitled "Get By". On June 18, 2018, during an RSVP Acoustic session, the band announced their next album, Composure, was set for release on July 13, 2018. It was preceded two weeks prior by a single and accompanying music video entitled "From the Outside".

The band released an EP called Even More Acoustic Songs on digital platforms and on a limited 7" vinyl pressing.

In early 2020, the band deleted their previous posts on social media, causing many to believe they had broken up. Lambton denied these rumors. On February 14, 2020, the band released a statement saying they have parted ways with Lambton. In the statement, they noted "This is not the end of Real Friends. We have simply turned the page to the next chapter."

=== Introduction of Cody Muraro and Torn In Two EP (2021–2023) ===
One year and four months after Lambton's departure, the band announced Cody Muraro, formerly of Youth Fountain & Parting Ways, as their new vocalist. Pure Noise Records stated that the split with Lambton was amicable and a result of their "paths diverging." They also announced their deal with Pure Noise Records and released two new singles, "Nervous Wreck" and "Storyteller", on June 21, 2021. They released the EP Torn in Two in September 2021.

The band released their next EP, There's Nothing Worse Than Too Late, on February 24, 2023.

=== Blue Hour and departure of Cody Muraro (2024–present) ===
Following two co-headlining tours with Knuckle Puck in 2023, Real Friends entered the studio in January 2024. The band confirmed that they would be working on a fourth studio album, which will be their first with Muraro as vocalist.

On June 28, 2024, Real Friends released the single "Waiting Room." Shortly after its release, they toured as a part of Sad Summer Festival, which started the following month.

On August 7, 2024, the band released "Our Love Was Like A Sad Song" as a single. The single's release was accompanied by the announcement of their fourth studio album, Blue Hour, which was released on October 11, 2024 on their own label, Midwest Trash.

On September 10, 2026, Cody Muraro left the band to pursue his own creative ideas.

== Style and influences ==
Real Friends has been described as pop punk, emo and emo pop. Punknews reviewer said "If American Football went totally pop-punk, Real Friends would be the result." The band's early releases are known for their "explosive, emo-driven sound". The band's songs are described as "introspective" and "cathartic", with lyrical themes addressing topics such as mental health, physical health, loneliness and nostalgia.

Vocalist Dan Lambton has been compared to the Starting Line's Kenny Vasoli, the Wonder Years' Dan Campbell, and the Dangerous Summer's AJ Perdomo. Bassist Kyle Fasel has cited American Football, Dashboard Confessional, the Early November, Jimmy Eat World, the Promise Ring, Saves the Day, the Starting Line, Spitalfield, Taking Back Sunday and Thursday as influences.

== Side projects ==
Lambton joined with Knuckle Puck members Joe Taylor and Ryan Rumchaks to form Rationale. Taylor and Lambton both serve as guitarists and vocalists, alongside Rumchaks as drummer and Tyler Albertson (clockwise) & Nick Casasanto (counter-clockwise) as rotating bass guitarists. Rationale's single "Hangnail" was released on December 5, 2015, and their debut EP Confines followed four days later.

== Band members ==
Current

- Dave Knox – lead guitar, backing vocals (2010–present)
- Kyle Fasel – bass guitar (2010–present)
- Eric Haines – rhythm guitar (2011–present)
- Brian Blake – drums, percussion (2011–present)

Former

- Aaron Schuck – drums (2010–2011)
- Dan Lambton – lead vocals (2010–2020)
- Cody Muraro – lead vocals (2020–2026)

Timeline

== Discography ==
Studio albums

- Maybe This Place Is the Same and We're Just Changing (2014)
- The Home Inside My Head (2016)
- Composure (2018)
- Blue Hour (2024)
