= Knuckle Puck =

American rock band

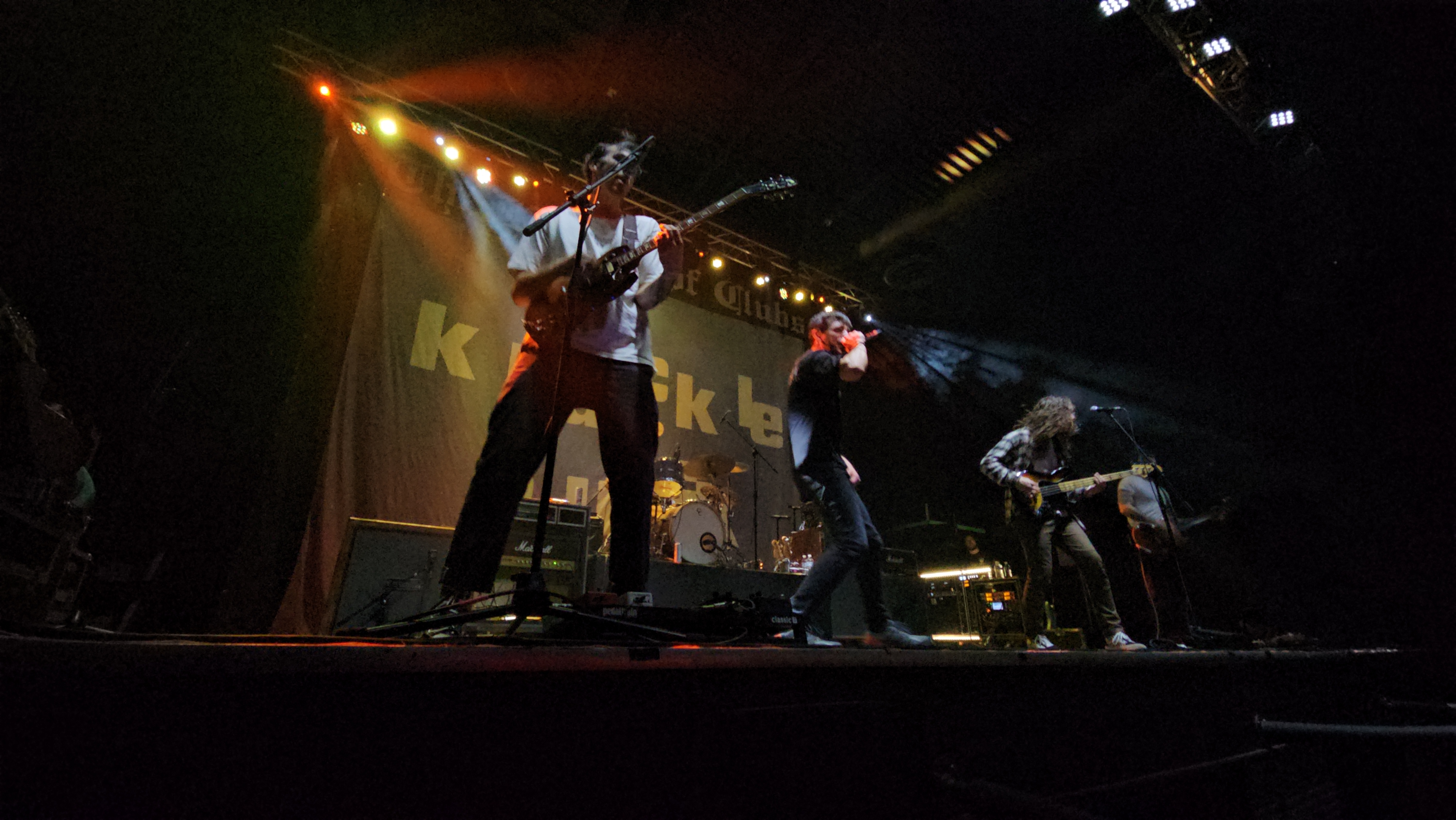
- Knuckle Puck performing live in Columbus, Ohio in March 2023.

Background information
- Origin: Chicago, Illinois, U.S.
- Genres: Pop punk; emo
- Years active: 2010–present
- Labels: Pure Noise; Wax Bodega; Bad Timing; Rise
- Members: Joe Taylor; Kevin Maida; John Siorek; Nick Casasanto; Ryan Rumchaks
- Website: knucklepuckil.com

Knuckle Puck is an American rock band, formed in 2010 in the suburbs of Chicago, Illinois. The band's name comes from the "knucklepuck" shot in ice hockey, which was popularized by the 1994 film D2: The Mighty Ducks.

The group has released several EPs, one of which, While I Stay Secluded (2014), peaked at number 5 on the Heatseekers Albums chart. The same year, they also released a split EP with UK band, Neck Deep. Knuckle Puck signed to Rise in 2014 and released their debut album, Copacetic, through the label in 2015. From there, they'd release their second studio album, Shapeshifter (2017), and their third, 20/20 (2020).

In 2022 they signed to Pure Noise Records and dropped their lead single "Groundhog Day." This would be the first song released off their fourth studio album, Losing What We Love (2023).

== History ==
=== Formation and early releases (2010–2014) ===
Knuckle Puck started out covering songs in fall 2010 in the outskirts of Chicago. The band got its name from a Stick to Your Guns t-shirt that said "Knuckle Puck Crew". The band consisted of lead vocalist Joe Taylor, lead guitarist Kevin Maida, and drummer John Siorek. The group started writing original songs in April 2011 with the addition of rhythm guitarist Nick Casasanto. The group had friends fill in on bass. In July, the band played its first ever show. In October, the band released a self-titled EP, this was followed up by the Acoustics EP in March 2012. In October, the band released the Don't Come Home EP. The band co-headlined a tour with Seaway from late May to early June 2013. In August, the band self-released The Weight That You Buried EP. In February 2014 Bad Timing and Hopeless released a split EP that featured two songs each from Knuckle Puck and Neck Deep. Both bands toured together (alongside Light Years) from late February to early April. On March 16, the band performed at South by So What?! festival. In spring, the band gained bassist Ryan Rumchaks. Between May and June, the band supported Man Overboard on the group's The Heart Attack Tour alongside Transit, and Forever Came Calling.

A music video was released for the song "No Good" in June. It was directed by Eric Teti. In late July, it was announced the band were recording, and in early August the band finished recording its next release. Knuckle Puck supported Senses Fail on the band's Let It Enfold You 10th anniversary tour from late August till early October 2014. In early September, the band released a 7" flexi containing the songs "Oak Street" and "Home Alone", the former of which was intended for release on the group's next EP. The flexi was released by Bad Timing. On October 16, 2014, "Bedford Falls" was available for streaming. On October 23, the While I Stay Secluded EP was made available for streaming and on October 28, it was released by Bad Timing. The EP had peaked at number 5 on the Heatseekers Albums in the U.S. Guitarist Kevin Maida revealed that the band "firmly and confidently" considered the EP the group's best work so far. On October 31, the band released a music video for "Oak Street". In November and December, the band supported Modern Baseball on the group's winter tour.

=== Copacetic and Shapeshifter (2014–2020) ===
In November 2014, the various artists compilation album Punk Goes Pop 6 was released, it featured Knuckle Puck covering The 1975 song "Chocolate". On December 22, 2014, Knuckle Puck signed to Rise Records. Maida said that Rise would be "a bountiful new home" for the group and would help the band evolve. Throughout January and February 2015 the band supported Neck Deep on the band's The Intercontinental Championships Tour. In late February, the band announced it had started recording its debut album and by early April, the group had finished. The group joined The Maine's The American Candy Spring 2015 Tour, as a support act, throughout April and May. On June 11, the band's debut album, Copacetic, was announced. The artwork and track list was revealed. On June 19, a music video was released for "Disdain". On June 30, "True Contrite" was made available for streaming. The band played on the 2015 edition of Warped Tour. On July 14, "Pretense" was made available for streaming. On July 23, the album was made available for streaming. Copacetic released on July 31. The band supported State Champs on the group's European tour in September and October. The band toured the U.S. in October and November, with support from Seaway, Head North and Sorority Noise. In February and March 2016, the band supported Neck Deep and State Champs on the groups' co-headlining tour of the U.S.

In March 2017, a 7-inch vinyl single was released, featuring the tracks "Calendar Days" and "Indecisive". On July 27, the band released the first single from their at the time upcoming album onto YouTube and iTunes titled "Gone". A few months later in September the second single "Double Helix" was released on YouTube with its music video. The group released their second album, Shapeshifter, on October 13.

In May and June 2019, Knuckle Puck went on a co-headlining tour of the US with Citizen; both bands were supported by Hunny and Oso Oso. In October 2019, they appeared at the Four Chord Music Festival. That same month, Knuckle Puck released a 7" vinyl containing Gold Rush and Fences, previously released with Neck Deep and containing two more tracks. This vinyl sold out in a few hours.

=== 20/20 (2020–2022) ===
On February 21, 2020, the band released a single called "Tune You Out", and commenced a tour across North America with Heart Attack Man throughout February and March 2020, which was cut short by the onset of the COVID-19 pandemic. On April 21, 2020, a second single and 7" record "RSVP" was released. A music video for the song "Breathe" was released on June 18, 2020, the song features Derek Sanders from the band Mayday Parade. The band released their third album 20/20 on September 18, 2020. The band played multiple drive in shows in October 2020 with Hot Mulligan. In December 2021, the band headlined a tour celebrating their tenth anniversary with Arm's Length, Carly Cosgrove, and Snow Ellet.

On December 1, 2021, the band released a single "Levitate" and announced a US and European tour from March 2022 to June 2022 with co-headliner Hot Mulligan with support by Meet Me at the Altar and Anxious during the US shows. The band released an extended play Disposable Life on February 4, 2022, with Joe Taylor calling the recording of the EP "the most fun we've had in a long time" The band supported New Found Glory on the group's US tour through September 2022 to November 2022.

On October 20, 2022, the band announced that they had signed with Pure Noise Records and released a new single titled "Groundhog Day". The band announced that their upcoming 4th LP would release in 2024. The band later announced a compilation vinyl release Retrospective consisting of their first two EP's and their split with Neck Deep.

=== Losing What We Love (2023–present) ===
On August 8, 2023, Knuckle Puck released a cover of Third Eye Blind's song "Losing a Whole Year" as part of Pure Noise Records's compilation album Dead Formats Vol.2. On August 29 they released their single called "The Tower" as well as announce their 4th album Losing What We Love scheduled for an October 20 release date. On September 28 they released another single called "Losing What We Love".

Knuckle Puck played two consecutive co-headlining tours with Real Friends in the spring and fall of 2023. In 2024 they announced they'd be playing a string of headline shows in the United Kingdom ahead of their opening show for Neck Deep at Alexandra Palace, affectionately known as Ally Pally. This is the largest indoor show the band has ever played at 10,000 standing room capacity.

On July 10, 2024, Knuckle Puck released a cover of Noah Kahan's song "Stick Season" as part of Pure Noise Records's compilation album Dead Formats Vol.3. On July 22, 2024, Knuckle Puck announced a 10-year anniversary show commemorating the release of Copacetic. The band stated that it will be their first time playing the album in its entire length.

On October 24, 2024, the band released a new song entitled "On All Cylinders", a couple weeks before their tour with State Champs, Meet Me at the Altar, and Daisy Grenade started on November 8, 2024.

The band was confirmed to be performing at the 2026 Sonic Temple music festival in Columbus, Ohio.

== Musical style ==
Knuckle Puck sound has been described by AllMusic biographer James Christopher Monger as a "melodic blend of old-school punk rock and emo", compared to the likes of The Wonder Years, The Story So Far, and Rise Against. According to Punknews.org, the band "leans to more pop side of the punk spectrum." The band's debut album, Copacetic, has been categorized as emo and pop punk. AllMusic reviewer Timothy Monger noted the album's sound "ranging from blazing, epic emo and pop-punk to slower, more contemplative fare." Cleveland.com reviewer Troy L. Smith noted that people who liked early 2000s pop punk albums such as Simple Plan's No Pads, No Helmets...Just Balls (2002) and New Found Glory's Sticks and Stones (2002) would enjoy Copacetic.

The band's lyrical themes include personal development and freedom. AbsolutePunk observed: "In a genre that went from maligned to mall playlist and back, it’s not surprising that bands are a little bit flummoxed as to what works and what should be left in a 9th grade trapper keeper. Knuckle Puck, perhaps more than any of their peers, toe this line delicately. [...] We know that this is a band who has taken the gimmick out of being sad and made it hauntingly realistic."

== Side projects ==
Rumchaks released a solo EP, Decades, in July 2013. Rumchaks plays guitar and sings vocals in Oak Lawn, Illinois-based band Homesafe, alongside vocalist/bassist Tyler Albertson and drummer Emmanuel Duran. The group has released three EPs and one full-length studio album, Homesafe (2014), Inside Your Head (2015), Evermore (2016), And ONE (2018). Homesafe was signed to Pure Noise Records. They are currently unsigned.

Joe Taylor and Rumchaks joined with former Real Friends' vocalist Dan Lambton to form Rationale. With Rationale., Taylor plays guitar and vocals, Rumchaks plays drums, and Lambton on guitar and vocals. "Hangnail" was made available for streaming in December 2015, and the group's debut EP Confines followed shortly after.

Kevin Maida plays guitar in Chicago hardcore-punk band, Lurk. John Siorek has played drums for bands William Bonney, Droughts, and Matter of Fact. Nick Casasanto has a solo project called Bad New World. In January 2024 he released an EP by the same name.

== Legacy ==
Knuckle Puck was included on Alternative Press's "12 Bands You Need To Know: AP Editors pick their favorite 100 Bands" list in 2014. The band were included on Idobi's "Artists To Watch In 2014" list.

Knuckle Puck was nominated for the Best Underground Band in the 2015 Alternative Press Music Awards.

Knuckle Puck was nominated for Album of the Year and Best Breakthrough Band in the 2016 Alternative Press Music Awards.

== Band members ==
Current

- Joe Taylor – lead vocals (2010–present)
- Kevin Maida – lead guitar (2010–present)
- John Siorek – drums, percussion (2010–present)
- Nick Casasanto – rhythm guitar, co-lead vocals (2011–present)
- Ryan Rumchaks – bass guitar, backing vocals (2014–present)

== Discography ==
Studio albums

- Copacetic (2015)
- Shapeshifter (2017)
- 20/20 (2020)
- Losing What We Love (2023)
