= Set Your Goals discography =

Band discography

- Studio albums: 3
- EPs: 2
- Singles: 3
- Music videos: 8

The discography of Set Your Goals, an American rock band, consists of three studio albums, two extended plays and three singles.

== Studio albums ==
List of studio albums, with selected chart positions
| Year | Details | Peak chart positions | | |
| Year | Details | US | US Indie | US Heat. |
|---|---|---|---|---|
| Mutiny! | Released: July 11, 2006; Label: Eulogy; Format: CD, DL, LP | – | 46 | 47 |
| This Will Be the Death of Us | Released: July 21, 2009; Label: Epitaph; Format: CD, DL, LP | 65 | 10 | — |
| Burning at Both Ends | Released: June 28, 2011; Label: Epitaph; Format: CD, DL, LP | 165 | 27 | — |
"—" denotes a release that did not chart.

== Extended plays ==
List of extended plays
| Title | Details |
|---|---|
| Set Your Goals (reissued as Reset by Eulogy) | Released: 2004; Label: Straight On; Format: CD, DL, 7" vinyl, 10" vinyl |
| Steal Your Goals (split with the Steal) | Released: May 2006; Label: Gravity DIP; Format: 10" vinyl |

== Singles ==
List of singles, showing associated albums
| Title | Year | Album |
|---|---|---|
| "Certain" | 2011 | Burning at Both Ends |
| "Product of the 80's" | 2011 | Burning at Both Ends |
| "Only Right Now"/"I'll Walk It Off" | 2012 | Non-album single |
| "Accelerate" | 2026 | TBA |
| "Big Couch" | 2026 | TBA |

== Other appearances ==
List of other song appearances, showing associated albums
| Title | Year | Album |
|---|---|---|
| "Echoes" (acoustic) | 2007 | Punk Goes Acoustic 2 |
| "Message in a Bottle" (The Police cover) | 2008 | Myspace stream |
| "Put Yo Hood Up" (Lil Jon & the Eastside Boyz cover) | 2008 | Punk Goes Crunk |
| "The Lost Boys" | 2010 | Take Action Volume 9 |
| "Forgotten" (Gorilla Biscuits cover) | 2010 | PastPresent: Breaking Out the Classics |
| "Start the Reactor" (demo) | 2011 | Epitaph Winter/Spring 2011 Sampler |

== Videography ==
=== Video albums ===
List of video albums
| Title | Details |
|---|---|
| Mutiny! In the U.K. (with No Trigger) | Released: 2009; Label: Eulogy; Format: DVD-V |

=== Music videos ===
List of music videos, showing directors
| Title | Year | Director(s) |
|---|---|---|
| "Goonies Never Say Die!" | 2005 | |
| "Mutiny!" | 2006 | Kevin Wildt |
| "Echoes" | 2008 | Adam Patch |
| "This Will Be the Death of Us" | 2009 | |
| "Summer Jam" | 2009 | |
| "Gaia Bleeds (Make Way for Man)" | 2010 | |
| "Certain" | 2011 | |
| "The Last American Virgin" | 2011 | |
| "Big Couch" | 2026 | |
