= Set Your Goals =

Set Your Goals may refer to:

- Set Your Goals (band), an American rock band
  - Set Your Goals (EP), an extended play by the eponymous American rock band
- Set Your Goals (album), an album by CIV
