= Burning at Both Ends =

Studio album by Set Your Goals
- Released: June 28, 2011
- Recorded: October 2010 – January 2011
- Studio: Salad Days, Baltimore, Maryland; Tree Fort, Los Angeles, California
- Genre: Melodic hardcore, pop punk
- Length: 53:33
- Label: Epitaph
- Producer: Brian McTernan, Mike Green

Set Your Goals chronology
This Will Be the Death of Us (2009)	Burning at Both Ends (2011)

Singles from Burning at Both Ends
- 1. "Certain" Released: May 20, 2011; 2. "Product of the 80's" Released: June 4, 2012

Burning at Both Ends is the third studio album by American pop punk band Set Your Goals. Recording for the album began in October and November 2010 with producer Brian McTernan in Baltimore, Maryland. The group took a break to support You Me at Six on their UK tour in December; they were unable to fly back until the end of the month due to bad weather to finish the album. The sessions resumed and ran in to mid-January when the band ran out of studio time. They briefly tracked with second producer Mike Green in Los Angeles, California. Following recording, the band embarked on two US tours, one supporting Parkway Drive and the other alongside August Burns Red.

Leading up to the album's release announcement, "Start the Reactor" and "Exit Summer" were made available for streaming, and "Certain" served as the first single. Burning at Both Ends was released through independent label Epitaph Records in June 2011. A stint on the Warped Tour and performances at the Australian Soundwave Counter-Revolution festival followed. The band continued touring the US until the end of the year with two supporting slots for New Found Glory and Four Year Strong, and a separate headlining tour soon after. Shows in South America and festival appearances preceded a 2012 co-headlining US tour with Cartel and a UK tour. Following this, "Product of the 80's" was released as a single in June.

Described as a melodic hardcore and pop punk record, Burning at Both Ends has a slower tempo than the group's previous albums. It peaked at number 165 on the Billboard 200 and charted on the Billboard component charts—Independent Albums and Top Rock Albums. Burning at Both Ends received a favourable response from critics, although some noted the lack of energy and tempo. Dead Press! included the album on a pop punk best-of list.

== Background and recording ==
In March 2009, the band announced they had signed to independent label Epitaph Records, which had helped to free them from their contract with their previous label Eulogy Recordings. The group's second album, This Will Be the Death of Us, was released through Epitaph in July. It had some minor success, peaking at number 65 on the Billboard 200. On October 1, 2010, the group began recording with producer Brian McTernan at Salad Days Studios in Baltimore, Maryland. McTernan, who also acted as the engineer, was assisted in the production by Paul Leavitt. Going into the studio, the band had four to five versions of each track already worked out. During the sessions, McTernan wanted the group to write a hit; they subsequently jammed out "Certain" and "London Heathrow" in 30 minutes.

Recording continued in to November, before the group took a break to support You Me at Six on their headlining UK tour in December. While trying to fly home, the band were stuck at Heathrow Airport as all flights had been cancelled due to bad weather. They returned to Baltimore on December 29 and resumed recording the following day. Rhythm guitar and bass parts were finished, and half the vocals were done by January 5, 2011; lead guitar parts followed on January 8. The band left Baltimore on January 15 having run out of studio time. They began working with Mike Green in Los Angeles, California, on January 20 to finish up the vocals. These sessions were held at Tree Fort Studio; Green, who also served as the engineer, was assisted in production by Kyle Black.

On January 31, the group announced that they had finished recording. Three of the tracks featured additional vocal contributions: Black, Jenn Brown, Ryan Holden and Julio on "The Last American Virgin"; Matt Arcangeli on "Unconditional"; and Andrew Neufeld of Comeback Kid on "Illuminated Youth". In addition, throughout the album are crew vocals by: Brown, Holden, Julio, Arcangeli, Michael Bumblis, 1090 Club keyboardist Mike Galt, Emilio Martinez, Kevin O'Connell, Seahaven drummer James Phillips, Epitaph staff member Felicia Risolo, Brian Warner, and Set Your Goals. All the tracks except "Raphael" were mixed by JR McNeely at ELM Studio South in Nashville, Tennessee. "Raphael" was mixed by Black at Tree Fort. Dave Collins then mastered the tracks at DC Mastering in Los Angeles.

== Composition ==
Musically, the album has been described as melodic hardcore and pop punk, with hardcore punk-inspired guitar work. It drew comparisons to early Saves the Day and Blink-182. Overall, the album has a slower tempo than the band's past releases, except for "Exit Summer" and "Illuminated Youth", both of which retain faster tempos. All the songs are credited to Set Your Goals and Brian McTernan, with the exception of "Calaveras", which was written by drummer Mikey Ambrose. Vocalists Matt Wilson and Jordan Brown wrote all of the lyrics. "Cure for Apathy" is about being able to discern the differences between fame and success. "Start the Reactor" tackles the aspect of home life and the issues that arise from being part of a full-time touring act. Lyrically, "Happy New Year" is the darkest track on the album; Wilson said 2010 was the "worst year of [his] life", and had pondered over what the future held for him. "London Heathrow" had the working title "Smashing Pumpkins" as the group felt it was reminiscent of the work of the band of the same name. Brown said that he had premonitions in the form of daydreams, one of which came to him while he was stuck at Heathrow Airport and inspired the song.

"Trenches" is about the over-glamorised touring lifestyle that someone can only comprehend when they have lived through it. "The Last American Virgin" takes its title from the film of the same name; the lyrics are also styled after the film as Wilson felt it was relevant to his personal life. The music for "Exit Summer" dates back to 2004–2005 Mutiny!-era demos and lyrically tackles internal conflict between the band members. Wilson found it hard to write the lyrics for "Unconditional", as he had received news about a person he grew up with having done something wrong and was unable to process it. "Product of the 80's" had the working title "Cars" because it had a similar feel to the Cars' sound. Because it had a 1980s sound, Wilson decided to write about his childhood growing up the same era. The track includes references to various songs, shows, and movies from the decade: "Like a Virgin" (1984) by Madonna, Saved by the Bell (1989) and The Goonies (1985), among others.

While in the studio, band members were naming the tracks after Teenage Mutant Ninja Turtle references; Brown likening "Raphael" to the personality of the character of the same name. He said the lyrics served as "one long train of inner thought. First from confusion and fear, to want / need, to carelessness, and finally to remorse and forgiveness." A majority of "Illuminated Youth" was written while on the 2007 Paramore/the Starting Line tour. Brown called it an "invitation" for someone to leave their worries behind and become consumed in the "moments made possible by live music". "Not as Bad" talks about taking the plunge, breaking the rules and finding what works for the listener. The track lasts for nearly 19 minutes in total, however, 15 minutes of it is silent; a hidden track starts at the 18-minute mark featuring the sounds of cats and burping. "Calaveras" sounds out of place compared to the rest of the album. Wilson said the lyrics were about his former residence at 4100 Calaveras Drive, which he described as being "like the den of iniquity."

== Release ==
In February and March 2011, the band supported Parkway Drive on their headlining tour of the US. On March 14, "Start the Reactor" was made available for streaming, and it was revealed that the group's new album, Burning at Both Ends, would be released later in the year. Following this, the group toured North American with August Burns Red in March and April. On May 4, Burning at Both Ends was announced for released in June, the track listing was revealed, and "Exit Summer" was made available for streaming. On May 20, "Certain" was released as a single, and was made available for streaming two days later. In May, the band went on a tour of the UK supporting Alkaline Trio, leading to a performance at Slam Dunk Festival. On June 8, a music video was premiered for "Certain" through Alternative Press; it was filmed the previous month in Santa Monica, California. It shows the band performing at a prom party, until halfway through when the crowd melts and merges into a monster that they fight off with music. Burning at Both Ends was made available for streaming on June 21, 2011, before being released on June 28, 2011 through Epitaph Records. "Calaveras" was included as a digital download bonus track and on the Japanese edition. The band donated a dollar for every copy sold in the first week of its release to breast cancer charity Keep A Breast Foundation.

Between June and August 2011, the group embarked for a stint on the Warped Tour. In late September and early October, the band toured Australia as part of the Soundwave Counter-Revolution festival. On October 5, a music video was premiered for "The Last American Virgin" through Alternative Press. In October and November, the band supported New Found Glory on their Pop Punk's Not Dead tour in the US. In December, the band went on a brief holiday tour with support from the Story So Far, This Time Next Year and the Sheds. They closed the year supporting Four Year Strong on their holiday tour dubbed It's a Wonderful Gig Life. In February 2012, the band played a few shows in Mexico and South America. Following appearances at the SXSW and South by So What?! festivals, the group embarked on a co-headlining US tour with Cartel. Mixtapes served as the main support act, while Hit the Lights and Fireworks appeared on select shows. In May, the group went on a UK tour alongside Make Do and Mend, Spycatcher, Hildamay and Evarose, leading to another appearance at Slam Dunk Festival. The group performed five shows in June as part of the Zumiez Couch Tour. "Product of the 80's" was released as a single before the tour on June 4.

== Reception ==
Professional ratings
Aggregate scores
Source	Rating
Metacritic	67/100
Review scores
Source	Rating
AbsolutePunk	56%
AllMusic	3/5 stars
Dead Press!	8/10 stars
PopMatters	6/10 stars
Punknews.org	3/5 stars
Rock Sound	8/10

Burning at Both Ends peaked at number 165 on the Billboard 200. In addition, it charted on two Billboard component charts: number 27 on Independent Albums, and number 43 on Top Rock Albums. Dead Press! ranked the release at number seven on their top ten pop punk albums of the year list.

Burning at Both Ends received generally favorable reviews, according to review aggregator Metacritic. The Aquarian Weekly writer Giorgio Mustica highlighted "Start the Reactor" and "Trenches", praising Wilson and Brown's vocals on both tracks. He admitted that while he is normally not a fan of pop punk, he found the album "really ... exciting." Exclaim! reviewer Farah Barakat noted the slower tempo and focus on melodies; she spotlighted "Exit Summer" and "Certain" as faster tracks, finding the former "quickly fall[ing] short after the first verse" and the latter being "the strongest track" on the album.

Tim Newbound of Rock Sound wrote that the band was "back in irresistibly anthemic form", containing the "right blend of punk attitude and pop genius. With 'Burning At Both Ends', the Bay Area sextet have further underlined their second-to-none pop-punk pedigree." Chris Loomes of Dead Press! said it was "definitely a grower", with the band "storm[ing]" through the record "bursting with catchy hooks and thriving melodies." He singled out a number of pleasing vocal moments across the album, namely in "Certain" and "Exit Summer".

AllMusic reviewer Gregory Heaney complimented the band's "liberal use of infectious singalong choruses and half-time breakdowns", which are handled in a manner that is "precise without feeling restrained." Brian Shultz, in a review for Punknews.org, said overall that the group simply took the mid-tempo speed of "Summer Jam" (an earlier track of theirs), and then added "plenty of gloss across the board." He said the record's highlights "only manage to stand out marginally" over the standouts on their second album.

PopMatters' Will Rausch wrote that while there were a few "solid" songs "and almost no terrible ones", a significant chunk of the album is simply "plain mediocre or leaves you with a feeling of musical blue balls." AbsolutePunk staff member Thomas Nassiff considered it a "downright embarrassment", adding that the sole major flaw it had was being "super boring." Critiquing it as a "blander, more watered-down version" of their previous album This Will Be the Death of Us, he felt the group's vocals were weak.

== Track listing ==
All songs written by Set Your Goals and Brian McTernan, except "Calaveras" by Mikey Ambrose. All lyrics by Matt Wilson and Jordan Brown.

No.	Title	Length
1.	"Cure for Apathy"	2:22
2.	"Start the Reactor"	2:42
3.	"Certain"	3:02
4.	"Happy New Year"	3:16
5.	"London Heathrow"	2:59
6.	"Trenches"	3:03
7.	"The Last American Virgin"	3:07
8.	"Exit Summer"	2:25
9.	"Unconditional"	3:26
10.	"Product of the 80's"	2:42
11.	"Raphael"	3:12
12.	"Illuminated Youth"	2:48
13.	"Not as Bad" (at 18:05 a hidden track begins)	18:53
Total length:		53:33

Digital download/Japanese bonus track
No.	Title	Length
14.	"Calaveras"	2:16
Total length:		55:49

== Personnel ==
Personnel per booklet.

Set Your Goals

- Matt Wilson – lead vocals
- Jordan Brown – lead vocals, guitars
- Audelio Flores, Jr. – guitars
- Daniel Coddaire – guitars
- Joe Saucedo – bass guitar
- Mike Ambrose – drums

Additional musicians

- Kyle Black – additional vocals (track 7)
- Jenn Brown – additional vocals (track 7), crew vocals
- Ryan Holden – additional vocals (track 7), crew vocals
- Julio – additional vocals (track 7), crew vocals
- Matt Arcangeli – additional vocals (track 9), crew vocals
- Andrew Neufeld – additional vocals (track 12)
- Michael Bumblis – crew vocals
- Mike Galt – crew vocals
- Emilio Martinez – crew vocals
- Kevin O'Connell – crew vocals
- James Phillips – crew vocals
- Felicia Risolo – crew vocals
- Brian Warner – crew vocals
- Set Your Goals – crew vocals

Production

- Brian McTernan – producer, engineer
- Paul Leavitt – assistance
- Mike Green – secondary producer, engineer
- Kyle Black – assistance, mixing (track 11)
- JR McNeely – mixing (except track 11)
- Dave Collins – mastering
- Evan Leake – art, layout
- Juan Ramirez – cover photographs

== Charts ==
Chart performance for Burning at Both Ends
Chart (2011)	Peak position
US Billboard 200	165
US Independent Albums (Billboard)	27
US Top Rock Albums (Billboard)	43
