= All I Have to Offer Is My Own Confusion =

Studio album by Fireworks
- Released: March 24, 2009
- Recorded: October 2008
- Studios: Buzzbomb Sound Labs, Orange, California
- Genres: Pop punk, power pop
- Length: 32:39
- Label: Triple Crown
- Producer: Chad Gilbert

Fireworks chronology
Adventure, Nostalgia and Robbery (2008)	All I Have to Offer Is My Own Confusion (2009)	Gospel (2011)

Professional ratings
Review scores
Source	Rating
Allmusic	3.5/5 stars
AbsolutePunk	8.3/10
Punknews.org	3/5 stars
Sputnikmusic	3.5/5
Rock Sound	7/10

All I Have to Offer Is My Own Confusion is the debut full-length studio album by American rock band Fireworks.

== Background ==
Fireworks formed in Metro Detroit, Michigan in 2005. The band consisted of vocalist David Mackinder, guitarists Brett Jones and Chris Mojan, bassist Kyle O'Neil, and drummer Tymm Rengers. The group released a demo, Can't Hardly Wait, before releasing the We Are Everywhere (2006) EP the following year. The group supported the EP by touring with bands such as Set Your Goals, Valencia, and Strung Out. In 2008 the band released another EP, Adventure, Nostalgia, and Robbery through Run for Cover. The EP featured one new song, a cover and two re-recordings of previously released songs. On July 31, it was announced that the band had signed to Triple Crown. A friend of the band gave Fred from Triple Crown their EP, from there the band "just kept bothering Fred until he signed us." In the announcement, the band realized they had not released much new material and reassured that they were working towards an album. The group was "extremely excited" to have signed with Triple Crown. In August, the band toured with Hit the Lights.

== Composition and recording ==
Compared to their past work, Mojan thought the band "made a nice but smooth progression." Some of the material "is more angry, some stuff is more rocking." O'Neil claimed the material sounded "more mature and developed" than their previous work. In terms of lyrics, he thought they "have definitely grown as people".All I Have to Offer Is My Own Confusion was recorded over the course of two and a half weeks in October 2008 at Buzz Bomb Sound Lab. 14 songs had been recorded in total, 12 of them appeared on the finished version of the album. It was produced by Chad Gilbert of New Found Glory and mixed by Paul Miner. The group knew of gilbert through mutual friends, but the idea of working with him came from Fred of Triple Crown.

== Release ==
In November 2008, the band went on tour with This Time Next Year. Following this, the band went on a brief tour with Polar Bear Club, Forfeit and the Swellers in December. On January 29, 2009, All I Have to Offer Is My Own Confusion was announced for release in two months' time. On February 13, 2009, "Detroit" was made available for streaming via the band's Myspace profile. In March, the band went on a tour of the US with This Time Next Year. A Loss for Words, Title Fight and Transit appeared on select dates. On March 17, "Come Around" was made available for streaming. After a planned winter release, and then a spring release, All I Have to Offer Is My Own Confusion was eventually released on 24 March through Triple Crown. A European edition was released by Hassle. The album's title is taken from a quote by American author Jack Kerouac. Throughout April, the band went on a co-headlining tour with We Are the Union. Though the tour was intended to run into May, Fireworks replaced Shai Hulud on their tour with New Found Glory from mid-April. Alongside Crime in Stereo and Title Fight, the band toured the US in June. In July, the band filmed a music video for "Detroit".

From mid-July until late August, the band supported Set Your Goals. In late August and early September, the band supported Four Year Strong. The band supported Hit the Lights on their Manatour tour between early October and early November. The band went on a co-headlining tour with The Wonder Years in mid-November. From late-November to mid-December, the band toured Europe, alongside Set Your Goals and Broadway Calls. On January 11, 2010, the music video for "Detroit" was posted online. The band were initially planned to support Anti-Flag but were replaced by Star Fucking Hipsters, The Menzingers, Trash Talk and Broadway Calls. From late January to mid-March, the band supported New Found Glory on their US tour. In early June, the band supported Four Year Strong on their Enemy of Europe Tour. In July, the band went on a tour of the US with Four Year Strong, Set Your Goals, the Swellers and Grave Maker. From mid-August until early October, the band supported the Swellers on their tour of the US.

== Track listing ==
All tracks are written by Fireworks.

No.	Title	Length
1.	"Geography, Vonnegut and Me"	3:43
2.	"Come Around"	2:53
3.	"Closet Weather"	2:35
4.	"2923 Monroe St."	3:12
5.	"Holiday"	2:32
6.	"I Support Same Sex Marriage"	3:25
7.	"Show Me Your Vanishing Act One More Time"	0:57
8.	"You've Lost Your Charm"	2:37
9.	"Again and Again"	3:14
10.	"Detroit"	3:56
11.	"When We Stand on Each Other We Block Out the Sun"	3:35
Total length:		32:39

== Personnel ==
Fireworks

- David Mackinder – lead vocals, keyboard, piano, guitars
- Chris Mojan – guitars
- Brett Jones – guitars
- Kyle O'Neil – bass
- Tymm Rengers – drums, percussion

Additional musicians

- Chad Gilbert – additional guitar, backing vocals
- Paul Miner – backing vocals

Production

- Chad Gilbert – producer
- Paul Miner – mixing
