= Misser =

Misser was an American emo band formed in Walnut Creek, California. The band's lineup consisted of Tim Landers (ex-Transit) on guitar and vocals and Brad Wiseman (ex-This Time Next Year) performing vocals. Since their formation in 2010, the band has released three EPs and one full-length album. The band has toured with bands such as Transit, Diamond Youth, the Wonder Years, Hostage Calm, and Fireworks.

== History ==
Misser started as the solo project of Landers while he was still playing in Transit. Landers wrote six songs and tracked them with Dan Rose (of Daybreaker). Jay Maas was set to mix and master the tracks, but the project files were instead deleted from his computer. A few months later Landers released those songs online in their original state. Landers was later approached by Justin Collier of Lost Tape Collective and he agreed to release three of the original six songs on cassette along with a cover of Archers of Loaf's "Web in Front."

While at a mutual friend's house, Landers and Wiseman discussed the possibility of playing in a band together. Landers would go on to tell Wiseman about the songs that he had previously written. The next time Landers visited California the two re-recorded two of the original six tracks and wrote an additional one, creating the Problems. Problems. Problems. EP. The EP was officially released on Bandcamp in December 2011.

On January 10, 2012, the band announced via Facebook that they had signed to Rise Records and were planning release a full-length album. It was also announced via Alternative Press that Gary Cioffi had signed on to produce the band's debut full length. The album, Every Day I Tell Myself I'm Going To Be A Better Person, was released on May 15, 2012.

In December 2012 it was announced that Misser would tour supporting The Wonder Years, along with Fireworks and Hostage Calm in the Spring of 2013. On March 6, 2013 the song “Goddamn, Salad Days” premiered on Revolvermag.com. On May 23, 2013 the bands streamed new EP, Distancing, via PropertyOfZack. The EP was officially released on May 28 through Rise Records. In December 2013 the band played a series of holiday shows with Long Lost and Transit.

Misser went through a period of inactivity, with Landers working on a different musical endeavor called Cold Collective. On August 5, 2016 Misser were announced as direct support for Set Your Goals on a series of shows celebrating the 10 year anniversary of the band's debut album, Mutiny!.

Landers died on February 2, 2019.

== Band members ==
=== Current members ===
- Brad Wiseman (2011–Present)

=== Previous members ===
- Tim Landers (2010–2019, deceased)

=== Touring musicians ===
- Torre Cioffi – guitar (from Transit and bloom.)
- Chris Browne – bass (from Polar Bear Club)
- Joe Longobardi – drums (from Defeater)

== Discography ==
EPs

- Misser tape (2011)
- Problems. Problems. Problems. EP (2011)
- Distancing EP (2013)

Studio albums

- Every Day I Tell Myself I'm Going To Be A Better Person (2012)
