= Solid Bond: The Complete Discography =

Compilation album by CIV
- Released: May 19, 2009
- Recorded: 1994 – 1998
- Genre: Punk rock
- Length: 92:45
- Label: Equal Vision
- Producer: Walter Schreifels, Don Fury

CIV chronology
| Thirteen Day Getaway (1998) | Solid Bond: The Complete Discography (2009) |

Professional ratings
Review scores
| Source | Rating |
|---|---|
| Punk News | 4/5 stars |
| Allmusic | 3/5 stars |

Solid Bond: The Complete Discography also known as CIV: The Complete Discography is a compilation album that features all music released by defunct punk rock band CIV, in addition to some never before released tracks. The album was released on May 19, 2009 through Equal Vision Records. This two disc album was the first time CIV has digitally released their music.

== Track listing ==
All music is composed by CIV, except track 15 by Davey Gunner and Doug Holland.

Disc 1
| No. | Title | Original album | Length |
|---|---|---|---|
| 1. | "Set Your Goals" | Set Your Goals (1995) | 1:50 |
| 2. | "Do Something" | Set Your Goals (1995) | 1:13 |
| 3. | "So Far, So Good... So What" | Set Your Goals (1995) | 2:11 |
| 4. | "State of Grace" | Set Your Goals (1995) | 0:59 |
| 5. | "Can't Wait One Minute More" | Set Your Goals (1995) | 2:32 |
| 6. | "Trust Slips Through Your Hands" | Set Your Goals (1995) | 1:12 |
| 7. | "Gang Opinion" | Set Your Goals (1995) | 1:28 |
| 8. | "Choices Made" | Set Your Goals (1995) | 2:28 |
| 9. | "Solid Bond" | Set Your Goals (1995) | 1:34 |
| 10. | "Marching Goals" | Set Your Goals (1995) | 0:32 |
| 11. | "United Kids" | Set Your Goals (1995) | 2:19 |
| 12. | "Soundtrack For Violence" | Set Your Goals (1995) | 0:32 |
| 13. | "Boring Summer" | Set Your Goals (1995) | 2:47 |
| 14. | "Et Tu Brute?" | Set Your Goals (1995) | 2:17 |
| 15. | "All Twisted" (Kraut cover) | Set Your Goals (1995) | 2:31 |
| 16. | "Don't Got To Prove It" | Set Your Goals (1995) | 1:57 |
| 17. | "Blessed" | Set Your Goals (Hidden Track) (1995) | 2:30 |
| 18. | "Glue" (SSD cover) | | 1:19 |
| 19. | "Social Climber" | Social Climber EP (1996) | 1:41 |
| 20. | "Sausages?" | Social Climber EP (1996) | 2:07 |
| 21. | "Don't Got To Prove It" (Live) | Anti-Matter Compilation (1996) | 3:21 |
| 22. | "Can't Wait One Minute More" (Live) | | 3:14 |
| 23. | "United Kids" (Live) | | 2:24 |
| 24. | "Soundtrack For Violence" (Live) | | 0:57 |
| 25. | "Can't Wait One Minute More" (Rehearsal Session) | | 2:39 |
| Total length: | | | 48:34 |

All music is composed by CIV, except track 13 by CIV and Walter Schreifels.

Disc 2
| No. | Title | Original album | Length |
|---|---|---|---|
| 1. | "Secondhand Superstar" | Thirteen Day Getaway (1998) | 2:44 |
| 2. | "Big Girl" | Thirteen Day Getaway (1998) | 2:50 |
| 3. | "Itchycoo Park" | Thirteen Day Getaway (1998) | 2:21 |
| 4. | "Haven't Been Myself In A While" | Thirteen Day Getaway (1998) | 2:37 |
| 5. | "Everyday" | Thirteen Day Getaway (1998) | 3:08 |
| 6. | "Shout It" | Thirteen Day Getaway (1998) | 2:30 |
| 7. | "Owner's Manual" | Thirteen Day Getaway (1998) | 0:34 |
| 8. | "Something Special" | Thirteen Day Getaway (1998) | 2:38 |
| 9. | "Using Someone Else" | Thirteen Day Getaway (1998) | 2:17 |
| 10. | "It's Not Your Fault" | Thirteen Day Getaway (1998) | 2:21 |
| 11. | "Living Life" | Thirteen Day Getaway (1998) | 1:59 |
| 12. | "Ordinary" | Thirteen Day Getaway (1998) | 2:41 |
| 13. | "Little Men" | Thirteen Day Getaway (1998) | 3:30 |
| 14. | "Worm's Eye View" | Secondhand Superstar EP (1998) | 0:41 |
| 15. | "Secondhand Superstar" (Demo) | | 2:36 |
| 16. | "Haven't Been Myself In A While" (Demo) | | 2:42 |
| 17. | "Everyday" (Demo) | | 3:16 |
| 18. | "Hard Times Are The Best Times" | | 2:46 |
| Total length: | | | 44:11 |

== Personnel ==
- Anthony Civarelli – Vocals
- Charlie Garriga – Guitar/Backing Vocals
- Arthur Smilios – Bass/Backing Vocals
- Sammy Siegler – Drums
