= Gospel (Fireworks album) =

Album by the American band Fireworks

Studio album by Fireworks
- Released: May 24, 2011
- Recorded: November–December 2010
- Studio: Salad Days, Baltimore, Maryland
- Genre: Pop punk
- Length: 36:10
- Label: Triple Crown
- Producer: Brian McTernan

Fireworks chronology
All I Have to Offer Is My Own Confusion (2009)	Gospel (2011)	Oh, Common Life (2014)

Gospel (stylized as gospel.) is the second studio album by American rock band Fireworks, released May 24, 2011 on Triple Crown Records. The album charted at number 40 on the Billboard Heatseekers Albums chart. The album includes the hit single "Arrows"

== Background and composition ==
According to guitarist Chris Mojan, "Arrows" is representative of the album as a whole. "Arrows" and "Teeth" show the band's maturing sound. When asked about what influenced "Oh, Why Can't We Start Old & Get Younger", Mojan replied the group "LOVE pop music." The creation of the song came from vocalist David Mackinder, who had a riff and a partial melody.

== Recording ==
Before the band went to the studio, they had tracked rough demos in May 2010 and sent them to producer Brian McTernan. The group had "immediate chemistry" with McTernan, they "knew we were in for quite the experience." Gospel was recorded at Salad Days Studio, located in Baltimore, Maryland, over the course of five weeks, in November and December. The first week was pre-production; McTernan brought up the songs the band had sent him. The band worked on the songs in the order they had been sent, beginning with "Oh, Why Can't We Start Old & Get Younger". The band made improvements where they felt were needed. After these changes, McTernan tracked the band playing the songs live. These versions became the basic draft for what the tracks would sound like at the end of the recording process. After the week of pre-production, the group had 14 songs in total they "felt confident in", according to drummer Tymm Rengers.

Rengers felt nervous working with McTernan, as Rengers considered him a "serious engineer", in the regards that "he wouldn't accept anything aside from the best". Rengers would soon unwind and felt "extremely comfortable." Drums were recorded first, then the bass was tracked. The group primarily focused on "building a strong rhythm section". Recording the rhythm guitar was easy for guitarist Chris Mojan, recording all the guitar tracks in a few days. Vocalist David Mackinder worked "really long days towards the end" of the recording process. Rengers "cringe[d] on the days when [...] Brian would just say "Dave, go warm up" and he'd have to start singing 15 minutes later." McTernan would also engineer and mix the album. Justin Caster provided organ and piano. Ryan Smith mastered the album at Sterling Sound.

== Release ==
In December 2010 the band released an EP, Bonfires, while they were recording Gospel and announced the tentative release date of spring 2011 for Gospel. On March 17, 2011 Gospel was announced for release, and the artwork and track listing was revealed. On April 7, "Summer" was made available for streaming and as a free download. A day later, the band went on a co-headlining with The Wonder Years, before they dropped off on the April 11 date due to the death of Mackinder's father. The band rejoined the tour on April 22. On April 27, "Arrows" was made available for streaming. Gospel was released on May 24 through Triple Crown. (Note: U.S. Triple Crown 3145) A UK edition was released by Banquet. (Note: UK Banquet KT 1024CD) The iTunes deluxe edition includes two bonus tracks: "Gloom" and "The Weekend Before Halloween".

The group went on a headlining tour with support from Hostage Calm and Mixtapes. Shortly afterwards the band went on a temporary hiatus. According to Mojan, "Everything was getting to be a little much. [...] There was a lot of pressure in our lives, in our relationships with people at home." In September and November, the band supported Polar Bear Club on their Clash Battle Guilt Pride tour. On September 22, a music video was released for "Arrows". It was directed by Thom Glunt. In March and April 2012 the band supported Set Your Goals. The band played on the 2012 edition of Warped Tour. In January 2013, the band supported All Time Low and Yellowcard on their co-headlining tour of Canada.

== Reception ==
Professional ratings
Review scores
Source	Rating
AbsolutePunk	9.2/10
Alternative Press	3.5/5 stars
Big Cheese	3/5
Rock Sound	7/10

Gospel received acclaim from both the critics and the band's fan base. The album was included at number 5 on PopMatters' best pop punk releases of 2011 list and at number 35 on Rock Sound's "The 51 Most Essential Pop Punk Albums of All Time" list.

== Track listing ==
1. "Arrows" – 3:38
2. "I Was Born in the Dark" – 2:23
3. "X's on Trees" – 3:24
4. "We're Still Pioneers" – 2:19
5. "Teeth" – 3:03
6. "Oh, Why Can't We Start Old & Get Younger" – 2:55
7. "Summer" – 2:56
8. "Life Is Killing Me" – 2:48
9. "I Am the Challenger" – 3:02
10. "Paintings of Paul Revere" – 2:43
11. "I Locked My Time Capsule" – 3:26
12. "The Wild Bunch" – 3:33

iTunes deluxe edition bonus tracks

13. "Gloom" – 2:54
14. "The Weekend Before Halloween" – 2:36

Japanese edition bonus tracks

13. "I Grew Up in a Legion Hall" – 3:06
14. "Five Years" – 1:19
15. "Like Ships in the Night" – 3:23

== Personnel ==
Personnel per booklet.

Fireworks

- David Mackinder – vocals
- Chris Mojan – guitar
- Brett Jones – guitar
- Kyle O'Neil – bass
- Tymm Rengers – drums

Additional musician

- Justin Caster – organ, piano

Production

- Brian McTernan – engineer, producer, mixing
- Ryan Smith – mastering
- Michael Burdick – illustrations
- John Regan – design, layout

== Charts ==
Chart (2011)	Peak position
U.S. Heatseekers Albums (Billboard)	40
