= This Will Be the Death of Us =

Studio album by Set Your Goals
- Released: July 21, 2009
- Recorded: February–March 2009
- Studios: Tree Fort (Los Angeles, California); Bricktop (Chicago, Illinois); Excello Recordings (Brooklyn, New York City); Skyview Church of Tone and Soul (East Nashville, Tennessee); New Found Glory's tour bus
- Genre: Pop punk
- Length: 38:06
- Label: Epitaph
- Producer: Mike Green

Set Your Goals chronology
Mutiny! (2006)	This Will Be the Death of Us (2009)	Burning at Both Ends (2011)

This Will Be the Death of Us is the second studio album by American rock band Set Your Goals, released on July 21, 2009, on Epitaph Records. Following the release of their debut album Mutiny! in 2006, the group discovered they were not being paid royalties. After a prolonged battle to terminate their contract, the band began working on their second album in late 2008. They spent March 2008 recording with producer Mike Green in Los Angeles, California. Friends from other bands contributed additional vocal performances on several songs. Preceded by supporting tours with New Found Glory and All Time Low, This Will Be the Death of Us was released through independent label Epitaph Records in July 2009.

Following the release, the group embarked on tours of Australia and the US, and appeared at the Reading and Leeds Festivals. Music videos were released for the title-track and "Summer Jam". This was followed by a support slot for Mayday Parade in the US; a European tour closed out the year. Further tours of the US, Australia and the UK (including an appearance at the Slam Dunk Festival) followed, leading up to a stint on the Warped Tour and the release of a music video for "Gaia Bleeds (Make Way for Man)".

Viewed as a pop punk release, This Will Be the Death of Us tackled the themes of questioning authority and straight edge culture. It peaked at number 65 on the Billboard 200, and charted within the top thirty on three Billboard component charts—Independent Albums, Alternative Albums and Top Rock Albums. The album received a positive reception from some critics, with a number of them praising the improvement in production and highlighting the guest vocal performance by Hayley Williams of Paramore.

== Background ==
Set Your Goals released their debut album Mutiny! through the independent record label Eulogy Recordings in July 2006. In December 2007, guitarist Dave Yoha left the band as he no longer wanted to tour full time; he was replaced temporarily by former member Dan Coddaire, who initially played in the band in 2006. In February 2008, vocalist Jordan Brown said the group had been "busy working on new songs over the last few months". In May 2008, the band posted "The Fallen..." online. Sometime afterward, guitarist Audelio Flores Jr. said the group had been writing and were working on new songs. Drummer Mike Ambrose said they had done a bit of demoing and had skeletons of songs.

The band attracted interest from Pete Wentz of Fall Out Boy, who wanted to sign the band to his label Decaydance. However, after Brown broke a stage monitor during a Fall Out Boy show and could not pay for it, Wentz signed another band instead. The group were not being paid any royalties for Mutiny! or merchandise sales by Eulogy Recordings founder John Wylie. They could not afford to audit Wylie; their manager Dave Crisafi, who was an employee of the label, would always take Eulogy's side when the issue of payment arose. Matt Wilson, the band's vocalist, claimed the band's members were naïve at the time, and upon learning that this was not the typical way things were done, they fired Crisafi.

When the band sought to terminate their recording contract with Eulogy, Wylie wanted what Wilson called "an astronomical amount" of money. One of the group's new managers, Chris Allen, personally planned to buy the band out of the contract for $125,000. However, their second manager Keith Lazorchak contacted independent label Epitaph Records, who had an interest in buying out the contract. On August 18, 2008, it was announced that the band was free from their contract with Eulogy. A portion of it was paid up-front with the remainder being recouped later through sales of their second album.

== Production ==
The same day the group were freed from their contract, it was revealed that they were in the process of writing their next album. Though Flores said the group were going to be recording in October and November, they were still in the writing process. On October 30, Coddaire had officially re-joined the group. Epitaph founder Brett Gurewitz wanted the band to enlist the services of a 1990s-style punk producer, however, the group wanted to work with someone who had experience with pop acts. Vocalist Matt Wilson explained: "We know how to do the fast punk thing; we wanted a more polished sound to it." They began working with Mike Green for pre-production and demoing, before eventually enlisting him as the album's producer. Sessions took place at the Tree Fort in Los Angeles, California, with Green at the helm in February 2009.

Numerous friends sang crowd vocals throughout the album, while some contributed additional vocals to specific tracks: Anthony Benedict on "Summer Jam", recorded by Andy Nelson at Bricktop Studios in Chicago, Illinois; I Am the Avalanche frontman Vinnie Caruana on the title-track, recorded by Hugh Pool at Excello Recordings in Brooklyn, New York City; New Found Glory guitarist Chad Gilbert on "Our Ethos: A Legacy to Pass On", recorded by Green at the Tree Fort; Turmoil frontman Jon Gula on "Gaia Bleeds (Make Way for Man)", recorded by John Gardner in his basement; and Paramore frontwoman Hayley Williams on "The Few That Remain", recorded by Roger Nichols at the Skyview Church of Tone and Soul in East Nashville, Tennessee. Green recorded extra guitars on "Summer Jam"; Brown recorded vocals for "With Hoffmain Lenses We Will See the Truth" with Cyrus Bolooki on New Found Glory's tour bus while they were on their Not Without a Fight (2009) tour. The recording process was concluded in late March 2009; the tracks were mixed by David Bendeth, before being mastered by Ted Jensen at Sterling Sound.

== Composition and lyrics ==
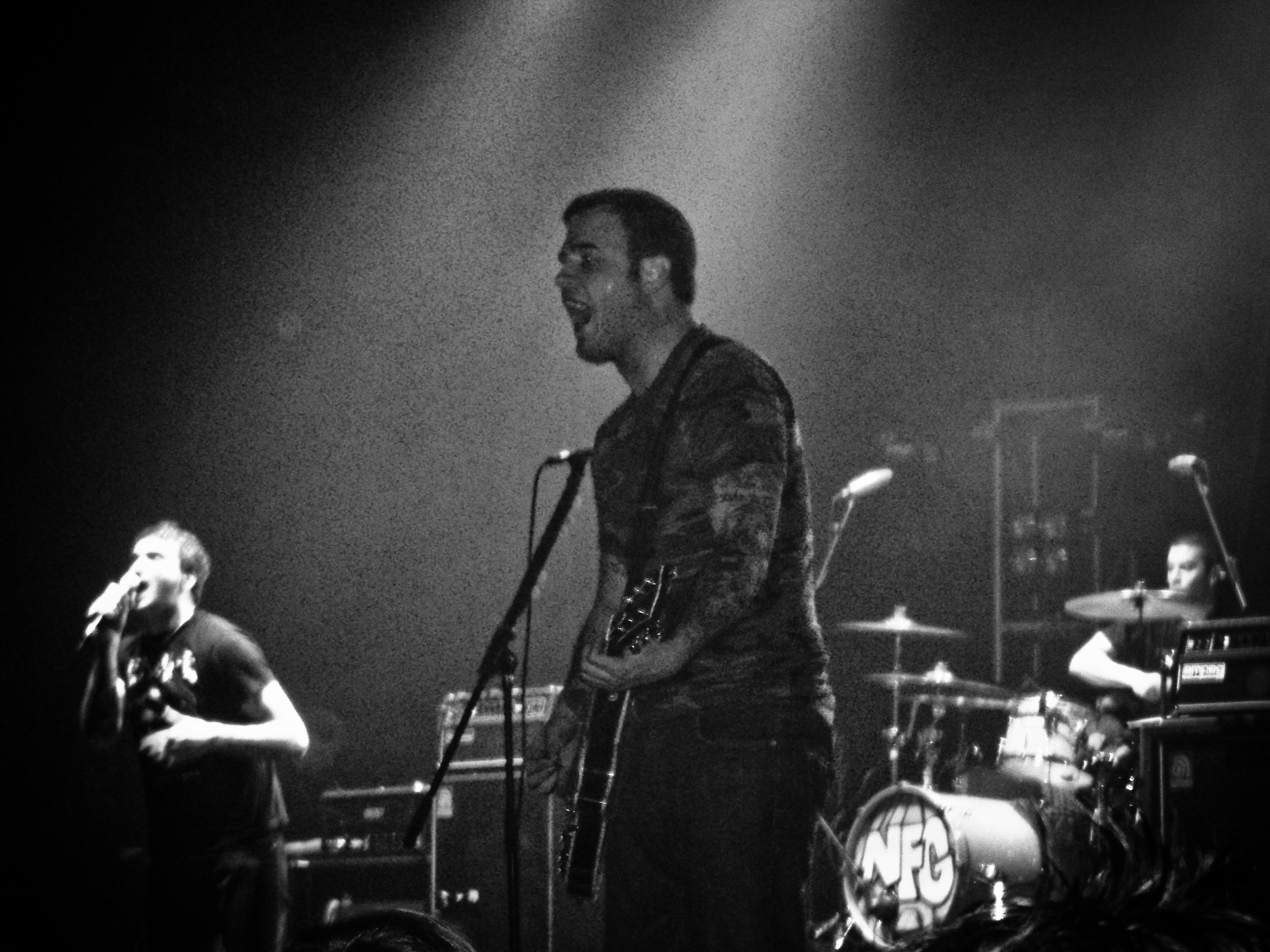
Various members of New Found Glory contributed to the making of the album by aiding in the recording or contributing vocals.

Musically described as pop punk, This Will Be the Death of Us drew comparisons to older punk rock bands such as Bad Religion and All. Lyrically, the album sees the group questioning authority, taking on life issues and straight edge culture. The album features various friends from other bands doing guest vocal performances; none of the features were planned, with Set Your Goals finding parts for them when they wanted to appear on the record. The title-track, "This Will Be the Death of Us", begins with fast tempo punk drums alongside catchy guitar parts. It has Wilson and Brown harmonizing throughout; the track is closed with a verse sung by Caruana. The song's second verse, sung by Brown, deals with his self-doubt: "I began to think of things in a very dark and untrue manner", which he said isolated him from himself and the band. He used his bandmates and adoration from fans as support. "With Hoffman Lenses We Will See the Truth" sees Brown doing media presenter vocals; Wilson said it was inspiured by Nineteen Eighty-Four (1949) by George Orwell, "8 O'Clock in the Morning" by Ray Nelson, and the films Soylent Green (1973) and They Live (1988). "Look Closer" covers the theme of complacency, with Wilson explaining that the track dealt with government overreach.

"Summer Jam" talks about Set Your Goals' early years of touring, and incorporates the intermittent use of a synthesizer. At one point, they make reference to various bands that they have performed alongside, including hardcore acts Crime in Stereo, Ignite and No Trigger, in addition to the pop-punk outfits Fireworks and New Found Glory. In another part of the song, its lyrics describe an incident that saw Set Your Goals, Fireworks and members of their touring crew arrested while at a mall. Tony Bologna, who did merchandise for Fireworks, had managed to escape; he subsequently sung the line "I'm just trying to get my smoothie on, dog" in the song. "Like You to Me" is filled with honest introspection, which Brown said talks about how "someone who cares about us views us, and how we in turn are able to see them in ourselves." Throughout the song, metaphors for film scripts are used for a person that us enthusiastic about a friend of theirs and for getting into music. The track ends with dialogue from a poem by Browm, which talks about taking chances and forming kinship with someone. "The Fallen…" retains the sound of its earlier demo with sharper production, and talks about the group's problems with both Eulogy Records and other labels in general. The track acts as a textbook example of a Set Your Goals song: high-energy power chords, singled-out lead guitar work driven by punk drum beats. It also displays the duelling vocals between Brown and Wilson, alongside gang vocals. Wilson said it was about putting one's faith in a person, and the "harsh learning experience you can endure as a result of that trust." He explained that he and the rest of the band had had respect for people they looked up to, only to later learn that respect was one-sided.

Wilson said "The Few That Remain" was a partial sequel to "The Fallen…", detailing a shared mentality and passion between a group of people. He goes on to say that they should be the change they want to see. During the song, the music halts, letting Hayley Williams interject and ask "Whoa, whoa, guys, is it cool if I get in on this here?", before the music restarts with her part. Wilson said the track took inspiration from hip hop music, which influenced the vocals. "Equals" has the band reassuring fans that they are people like them, and sees Brown talking about his personal failures, such as a behavioral disorder he suffers from. "Gaia Bleeds (Make Way for Man)", is the heaviest track the band has written, and features Gula. Talking about the song, Wilson said: "Humanity has assumed the role of God. With that role comes a great responsibility and we are failing. We abuse our powers as we kill ourselves, kill other, and kill the Earth." With "Flawed Methods of Persecution & Punishment", Brown wanted to compose a track that was influenced by a documentary he saw, At the Death House Door (2008), which details the mistreatment against prisoners on deathrow in a Texas prison. Brown felt hopeless while watching it and decided to capture his thoughts in writing. AbsolutePunk staff member Drew Beringer said the socially aware lyricism was disguised by the use of gang vocals. "Arrival Notes" serves as an acoustic instrumental interlude; it came about from Ambrose and Wilson playing around with an acoustic chord progression until they found music that conveyed their thoughts better without needing vocals or percussion to enhance it. "Our Ethos: A Legacy to Pass On" is indebted classic hardcore and 1990s skate punk, and features vocals from Gilbert. The band initially planned for Toby Morse of H_{2}O to do it, however, when he became unavailable they drafted Gilbert. Wilson said the track "encompass[es] our way of life and the future that it holds for us." Jordan Pundik, also of New Found Glory, provides vocals on "The Lost Boys".

== Release ==
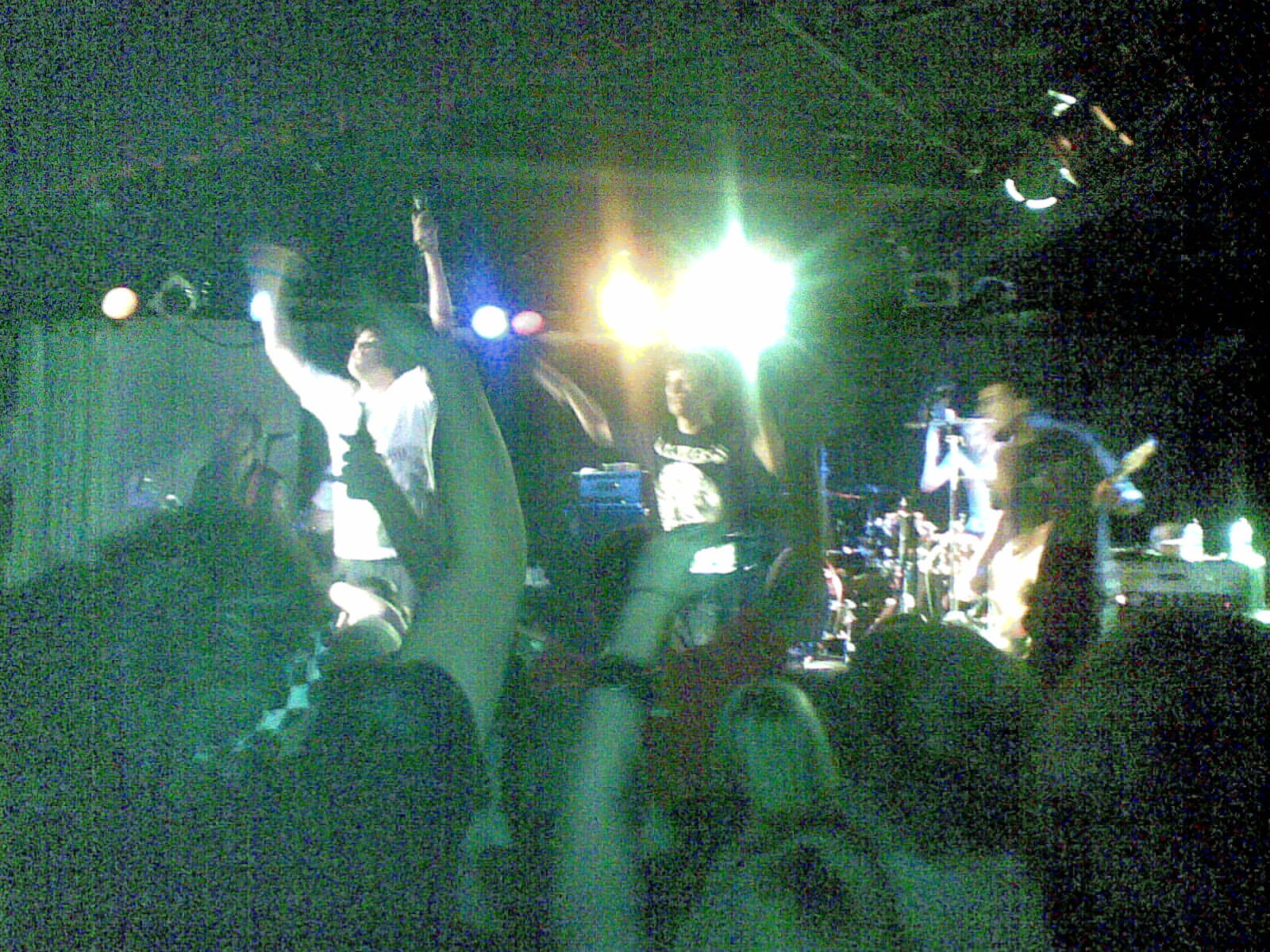
Set Your Goals toured throughout 2009 and 2010 in support of This Will Be the Death of Us.

In March 2009, Punknews.org reported that Set Your Goal's second album would be released in four months' time. On March 24, 2009, it was announced that the band had signed to Epitaph Records, and that their next album would be titled This Will Be the Death of Us. Between late March and early May, the band supported New Found Glory on their headlining tour of the US, leading up to an appearance at The Bamboozle festival. On May 25, 2009, the album's track listing and artwork were posted online. After this, the band went on a brief tour of Japan with All Time Low. On June 2, the band said that if 5,000 people retweeted one of their tweets, they would release a track, and the following day, "This Will Be the Death of Us" was posted on their Myspace profile. Shortly afterwards, the band toured Australia as part of the Take Action Tour. On June 18, 2009, "Gaia Bleeds (Make Way for Man)" was posted on Myspace.

On June 30, 2009, a music video was released for "This Will Be the Death of Us", which was filmed in a warehouse in Los Angeles, California. The band perform in said building, cut with shots of Brown and Wilson separately singing on a stairwell and inside of an elevator. In July and August 2009, the band went on a co-headlining US tour with Four Year Strong; main support came from Fireworks, while the Swellers, Grave Maker, Drive A and A Loss for Words appeared on select shows. While on this tour, This Will Be the Death of Us was made available for streaming on July 17, 2009 through Myspace, before being release three days later. The Japanese edition featured "The Lost Boys" as a bonus track. Further dates were added to the group's tour, extending it into late August; later that month, the group performed at the Reading and Leeds Festivals.

On September 23, a music video was released for "Summer Jam". It consists of live performances, photo shoots and driving across the country. Between late September and mid-November, the band supported Mayday Parade on the AP Fall Ball Tour. The band dropped off a few shows citing health issues. Shortly after this, "The Lost Boys" was made available for streaming in October 2009. In November and December 2009, the group embarked on a European tour with Broadway Calls and Fireworks. In January and February 2010, Set Your Goals supported Motion City Soundtrack on their headlining tour of the US, which was followed by performances at Soundwave music festival in Australia in February and March. After this, the band went on a cross-country US tour with support from Comeback Kid, the Wonder Years and This Time Next Year. Between late June and early August, the band performed on Warped Tour. On July 10, a music video was released for "Gaia Bleeds (Make Way for Man)"; the clip sees the group challenge "American greed and destructive wastefulness", interspersed with facts about the earth's devastation.

== Reception ==
Professional ratings
Review scores
Source	Rating
The 405	7/10
AbsolutePunk	87%
AllMusic	4/5 stars
Alternative Press	4.5/5 stars
Chart Attack	Favorable
Ox-Fanzine	8/10 stars
Punknews.org	2.5/5 stars
Rock Sound	8/10
Ultimate Guitar	9/10

This Will Be the Death of Us received positive reviews from some music critics. Scott Heisel of Alternative Press complimented Wilson's "drastically improved vocals", with him being able to step out of Brown's shadow and praised William's guest spot as being the most memorable. Beringer viewed it as being akin to the Power Rangers—"the tracks are awesome individually, but become unstoppable when listened to together." He saw it as an improvement "in every way" compared to Mutiny!, with the band coming across as "spectacular" in crafting a "catchy hook without it sounding glossy and overproduced." Ultimate Guitar applauded the improved production style and inventive guitar riffs. While noting Brown and Wilson's distinct vocal stylings, they manage to "sync up perfectly with each other." Rock Sound writer Andrew Kelham simply labelled it as "another solid record" that is "easy and digestible yet rambunctious and chaotic." AllMusic reviewer Pemberton Roach noted the "step up" in the production with a "crisp, clean, snap-tight sound." He found the group's "mature, positive attitude" mixing effectively with the "music's youthful exuberance", showcasing a record that is " both musically captivating and refreshingly non-preachy."

The 405's Rob Evans said the record did not "really come close" to besting Mutiny!, with the band "los[ing] their spark." He added that the release "lacks the quickfire urgency" that Mutiny! had; despite these negatives Evans called it "a great album" overall. Ox-Fanzine writer Christin Pausch said it contained a "few catchy tunes" and called it a "worthy successor", however, it "doesn't hit [you in] the face like Mutiny [does]." Punknews.org staff member Joe Pelone considered the record a sophomore slump, criticizing the "roughly 1,300 guest vocalists on this g.d. album", though singling Williams' performance as a highlight. The overall emotion he got from the album was disappointment with a number of the earlier tracks blending together. NME's was highly critical of the group's "attempt to inculcate and lead a Generation Next-style movement ... is a pathetically polished war cry", lambasting it as "unlikely to stir a teen from their slumber with its vacuous and laminated scuzzy guff, let alone inspire the rebellion it desires."

This Will Be the Death of Us peaked at number 65 on the US Billboard 200. In addition, it charted on three Billboard component charts: number 10 on Independent Albums, number 22 on Alternative Albums, and number 27 on Top Rock Albums.

== Track listing ==
Track listing per booklet.

No.	Title	Length
1.	"This Will Be the Death of Us"	3:09
2.	"With Hoffman Lenses We Will See the Truth"	0:43
3.	"Look Closer"	3:50
4.	"Summer Jam"	3:05
5.	"Like You to Me"	4:26
6.	"The Fallen..."	3:24
7.	"The Few That Remain"	3:21
8.	"Equals"	3:23
9.	"Gaia Bleeds (Make Way for Man)"	2:52
10.	"Flawed Methods of Persecution & Punishment"	4:09
11.	"Arrival Notes"	1:08
12.	"Our Ethos: A Legacy to Pass On"	4:36
Total length:		38:06

Japanese bonus track
No.	Title	Length
13.	"The Lost Boys"	2:10

== Personnel ==
Personnel per sleeve, except where noted.

Set Your Goals

- Matt Wilson – lead vocals
- Jordan Brown – lead vocals, guitars, media vocals (track 2)
- Daniel Coddaire – guitars
- Audelio Flores Jr. – guitars
- Joe Saucedo – bass guitar
- Mike Ambrose – drums

Additional musicians

- Anthony Benedict – vocals (track 4), crowd vocals
- Vinnie Caruana – vocals (track 1)
- Chad Gilbert – vocals (track 12), crowd vocals
- Jon Gula – vocals (track 9)
- Hayley Williams – vocals (track 7), crowd vocals
- Jordan Pundik – vocals (track 13)
- Mike Green – guitars (track 4)
- Tom Ambellan – crowd vocals

Additional musicians (cont'd)

- Ryan Blank – crowd vocals
- Brian Bumblis – crowd vocals
- Michael Bumblis – crowd vocals
- Chris Clark – crowd vocals
- Hannah Donovan – crowd vocals
- Efren Gonzalez – crowd vocals
- Pete Grossman – crowd vocals
- Brett Jones – crowd vocals
- Dave Mackinder – crowd vocals
- Garth McKee – crowd vocals
- Chris Mojan – crowd vocals
- Todd Neif – crowd vocals
- Kyle O'Neil – crowd vocals
- Seth Morikawa – crowd vocals
- Donny Phillips – crowd vocals
- James Phillips – crowd vocals

Additional musicians (cont'd)

- John Regan – crowd vocals
- Tymm Rengers – crowd vocals
- Set Your Goals – crowd vocals

Production

- Mike Green – producer, engineer
- David Bendeth – mixing
- Ted Jensen – mastering
- Andy Nelson – recording
- Hugh Pool – recording
- John Gardner – recording
- Roger Nichols – recording
- Cyrus Bolooki – recording
- Drew Millward – concept, layout
- Rob Dobi – portrait illustration
- Matt Grayson – photos

== Charts ==
Chart performance for This Will Be the Death of Us
Chart (2009)	Peak position
US Billboard 200	65
US Top Alternative Albums (Billboard)	22
US Independent Albums (Billboard)	10
US Top Rock Albums (Billboard)	27

== See also ==
- Mass Nerder – the 1998 album by All, the sound of whom This Will Be the Death of Us was compared to
- Suffer – the 1988 album by Bad Religion, the sound of whom This Will Be the Death of Us was compared to
