= Living Hell =

Living Hell may refer to:

- Living Hell (film), a 2008 American TV horror film
- "Living Hell" (The Outer Limits), a 1995 television episode
- Living Hell, a 2007 young adult novel by Catherine Jinks
- "Living Hell", a song by New Found Glory from Resurrection
- "Living Hell", a song by This Time Next Year from Drop Out of Life

== See also ==
- Arkham Asylum: Living Hell, a DC Comics limited series
- Pain
- Punishment
- Suffering
