= CIV (band) =

American punk rock band

- CIV in a 1995 promotional photoshoot

Background information
- Origin: New York City, U.S.
- Genres: Punk rock; melodic hardcore; hardcore punk; pop-punk
- Years active: 1994–2000 (Partial reunions: 2008, 2011, 2012, 2024)
- Labels: Revelation; Atlantic; Lava
- Members: Anthony Civorelli; Charlie Garriga; Arthur Smilios; Sammy Siegler; Walter Schreifels; Cache Tolman

CIV was an American punk rock band from New York City. The band is named after its vocalist, Anthony Civorelli. Three of the band's members (Civorelli, Siegler and Smilios) were members of Gorilla Biscuits. Siegler also played in other hardcore bands, including Youth of Today and Judge.

After the break-up of Gorilla Biscuits, Civorelli opened a tattoo studio on Long Island. After the band Quicksand had signed to a major label, Schreifels re-united a late version of his former band, wrote a record and produced it, resulting in Set Your Goals. Smilios was replaced by Cache Tolman prior to the recording of their second full-length album, Thirteen Day Getaway. Shortly after releasing Thirteen Day Getaway, CIV disbanded in 2000. They have since reunited for a series of one-off shows, including New York's Black N Blue Bowl in 2008 and Belgium's Groezrock Festival in 2011. CIV had yet another reunion on September 7, 2012 at the Webster Hall in New York City. Announced in 2024, CIV reunited once more to support Shelter on a four night tour of the Northeast. The band played a one off show in The Netherlands in November 2024.

== Legacy ==
CIV is known for the single "Can't Wait One Minute More", which was released as a music video which was featured on Beavis and Butt-head and used in a Nissan automobile commercial during the middle of 2005. Lou Koller from hardcore band Sick of It All provided additional vocal tracks for the song. The video was directed by Marcos Siega - his first music video project, and edited by Steve Covello. The microphone used by CIV in the video was borrowed from the A/V room at Ketchum Advertising/NY where Marcos was working at the time.

Songs "All Twisted", "Haven't Been Myself in a While", and "Something Special" were also featured on the TV Show What's New, Scooby-Doo?. Their early track "Et Tu Brute?" is featured on the soundtrack to the film Escape from L.A.. Their track "So Far, So Good...So What", was featured on the soundtrack album to the cartoon series Mega Man which is based on the video game series of the same name by Capcom, and it was also played during the end credits of the episode "Brain Bots". "It's Not Your Fault" and "Living Life" can be found in Road Rash 3D.

The San Francisco Bay-area pop punk/hardcore band Set Your Goals is named after CIV's first album of the same name.

== Members ==
- Anthony "CIV" Civorelli - Vocals
- Charlie Garriga - Guitar/Backing Vocals
- Arthur Smilios - Bass/Backing Vocals
- Sammy Siegler - Drums

== Discography ==
Year	Title	Format	Label
1995	Set Your Goals	LP/CD	Revelation
1995	"All Twisted" b/w "Do Something"	7"	Revelation
1995	"Can't Wait One Minute More" b/w "Et Tu Brute?"	7"	Revelation
1995	"Choices Made" b/w "United Kids" / "Soundtrack for Violence"	7"	Lava Records
1995	"So Far, So Good, So What?" b/w "Choices Made" (Live)	7"	Atlantic
1996	"Social Climber" b/w "Sausages?"	7"	Revelation
1998	Thirteen Day Getaway	LP/CD	Atlantic
1998	"Secondhand Superstar" b/w "Worms Eye View" / "Owner's Manual"	7"	Some Records
2009	Solid Bond: The Complete Discography	CD	Equal Vision

== See also ==
- List of alternative music artists
- Quicksand (band)
