= Bright Grey =

Studio album by The Steal
- Released: September 29, 2008
- Recorded: July 2008
- Genre: Hardcore punk
- Label: Banquet

The Steal chronology
The Steal (2006)	Bright Grey (2008)

Bright Grey the second studio album by hardcore punk band The Steal, was released on CD and vinyl by Banquet Records. Its cover appears to be a homage to that of Spiderland by the post-rock band Slint.

The album was rated four out of five stars by Punknews.org.

== Track listing ==
1. The Possibilities Are Endless
2. Disconnected
3. Dave Gets Mad
4. No Control
5. Fashionless
6. The Angles
7. Repeat
8. Keep Moving Forward
9. Got Ideas
10. Horror Vacui
11. Breathe In
12. Statues
13. Kids With Kids
14. Keep It Simple
