= The Steal (album) =

Studio album by The Steal
- Released: January 2006
- Recorded: 28th - 30th Dec 2005
- Genre: Hardcore punk
- Length: 21:00
- Label: Gravity DIP
- Producer: Peter Miles

The Steal chronology
The Steal (2006)	Bright Grey (2008)

The Steal is the debut studio album by hardcore punk band The Steal. It was released on CD by Gravity DIP.

The album was rated four out of five stars by Punknews.org.

== Releases ==
January 2006 - On Gravity DIP, CD

== Track listing ==
1. Breakout
2. Little Dip
3. World Wide World
4. Libidon't
5. Waiting For The Simple Life
6. The Steal
7. Clothing Rack
8. Strength In Community
9. Living For The Weekend
10. Up In Smoke
11. Door To Door
12. New Friend
13. Loudest Voices
14. Wonderstuff
