= The Steal =

- The Steal

Background information
- Origin: Kingston upon Thames/Brighton, England
- Genres: Hardcore punk, melodic hardcore
- Years active: 2005–2009
- Label: Banquet
- Past members: Richard Phoenix; Mark Pavey; Lindsay Corstorphine; Dave House

The Steal were an English hardcore punk band, from Kingston upon Thames and Brighton.

== History ==
They formed in late 2005, and were influenced by Minor Threat, 7 Seconds and Kid Dynamite. In 2006 they completed a UK tour with American punk bands Set Your Goals and Lifetime. They were signed to Banquet Records, who organise shows in and around the Kingston upon Thames area in Greater London.

In July 2006 the band recorded a live session for BBC Radio 1's The Lock Up show.

In August 2007, the band released their debut album in the U.S. on Get Outta Town Records, and toured the US East Coast. Shortly after this went on an unofficial hiatus for seven months at the end of which, in April 2008, they toured with Against Me! and released some new material in the way of a split 7-inch single with another Brighton band, Beat Express.

In 2008, the band began writing their second album, Bright Grey in Devon, England. The album was recorded in two days. It was released on 29 September 2008. In this year the band recorded a second live session for The Lock Up show.

They played their final concert at The Peel on 18 September 2009, in their hometown of Kingston upon Thames, supporting Paint It Black.

The band split into two, forming Sauna Youth and Pacer. Bassist Dave House has also released four albums and two splits of solo material that dates back to 2004 before The Steal began.

== Band members ==
- Richard Phoenix: drums
- Mark Pavey: vocals
- Lindsay Corstorphine: guitar
- Dave House: bass guitar

== Discography ==
=== EPs ===
Year	Title	Label
2006	Steal Your Goals - split 10-inch with Set Your Goals	Gravity DIP
2008	Split 7-inch with Beat Express	Self-Released

=== Albums ===
Year	Title	Label
2006	The Steal	Gravity DIP
2008	Bright Grey	Banquet
