= Oh, Common Life =

Studio album by Fireworks
- Released: March 25, 2014
- Recorded: Summer and October 2013, Salad Days, Baltimore
- Genres: Alternative rock, indie rock, pop punk
- Length: 35:28
- Label: Triple Crown
- Producer: Brian McTernan

Fireworks chronology
Gospel (2011)	Oh, Common Life (2014)	Higher Lonely Power (2023)

Oh, Common Life (stylized as (oh), common life.) is the third studio album by American rock band Fireworks. After the release of their previous album, Gospel (2011), the band went on hiatus. During this hiatus the band wrote and demoed new material. In the summer of 2013 the band returned to the studio, with Brian McTernan producing. The band's next album was announced in January 2014 and was released a couple of months later through Triple Crown. Prior to the album's release, "Glowing Crosses" and "Flies on Tape" were made available for streaming. Music videos were released for "Glowing Crosses", "Bed Sores", and "...Run, Brother, Run...", in March, August and October, respectively.

== Background, composition and recording ==
Following the release of their second album, Gospel (2011), Fireworks went on a temporary hiatus. According to guitarist Chris Mojan, "Everything was getting to be a little much. [...] There was a lot of pressure in our lives, in our relationships with people at home." While on the hiatus, the band were writing new material as early as January 2012. The group was unsure if their next release would be an EP or an album. In June, it was announced that the band were recording demos. The band went on the 2012 edition of Warped Tour. In August, it was revealed the band were writing specifically for a new album. Mojan revealed the band had taken "a very selfish approach" to the new material. The group "just wrote the record we wanted to write" and as a result, "ended up being our most personal" collection of songs. The album was dedicated to Mackinder's father, David Mackinder Sr. "...Run, Brother, Run..." is about Mackinder looking back on his father's death, which happened in April 2011. Mackinder revealed that "Reflecting on death and the past can be equally as haunting as it is inspiring. I think from tragic situations comes unexplainable wisdom sometimes."

In the summer and October 2013 the band recorded Oh, Common Life at Salad Days, located in Baltimore. The album was produced by Brian McTernan, who had produced Gospel. McTernan also engineered and mixed the album. Mastering was done by Ryan Smith at Sterling Sound. It was later revealed that the band tried to get Bill Clinton to play saxophone on the album.

== Release ==
On December 13, 2013, Fireworks posted a teaser video with the title "Oh, Common Life", the video featured a clip of a new song. This new song was later revealed to be "Oh, Common Life". On January 29, 2014, Fireworks announced their third album, Oh, Common Life for release and revealed the artwork. The artwork was created by Michael Egave Burdick who provided illustrations, while John Regan did the design and the layout. "Glowing Crosses" was made available for streaming on February 13. On February 20, the album's track list was revealed. On March 4, "Flies on Tape" was made available for streaming. Starting from March 5 until mid April, the band supported The Wonder Years on their Greatest Generation World Tour, after Defeater dropped off the tour. On March 18, the album was made available for streaming via the Red Bull website. Oh, Common Life was released on March 25 through Triple Crown. (Note: U.S. Triple Crown 3175) On the same day, a music video was released for "Glowing Crosses". On April 3, the band made the song "Oh, Common Life" available for streaming. On June 6, the band released an acoustic EP called Oh, Common Life – Sessions.

The band went on a headlining tour in July with support from Young Statues and Better Off. On August 5, a music video was released for "Bed Sores", the video was directed by Max Moores. The band wanted the video to be a representation of the whole album. The band supported New Found Glory on the Glamour Kills tour in October and November. On October 22, a music video was released for "...Run, Brother, Run...". The video is a companion to the song's concept – "like playing in a legion hall where our collective bands' first shows took place to a snapshot of home videos showing a personal side to the band", according to Mackinder. The video filmed in the band's hometown, Detroit, and was directed by John Komar and Mitchell Wojcik. In February and March 2015, the band performed at Soundwave festival in Australia. In May the band went on a tour of the UK. In June and July, the band toured across the U.S. with support from Turnover and Sorority Noise. The band went on another U.S. tour in August, with support from Weatherbox and Dry Jacket, before going on indefinite hiatus.

== Reception ==
Professional ratings
Aggregate scores
Source	Rating
Metacritic	83/100
Review scores
Source	Rating
AbsolutePunk	8.5/10
AllMusic	3.5/5 stars
Alternative Press	4.5/5 stars
Pitchfork	7.8/10
Rock Sound	8/10

The album charted at number 148 on the Billboard 200 chart. "Flies on Tape" was included on Alternative Press's "11 New Songs You Need To Hear Before March 2014 Ends" list.

== Track listing ==
1. "Glowing Crosses" – 3:03
2. "Bed Sores" – 2:42
3. "The Back Window's Down" – 3:29
4. "Flies on Tape" – 2:56
5. "Woods" – 3:21
6. "Play "God Only Knows" at My Funeral" – 2:59
7. "One More Creature Dizzy with Love" – 3:45
8. "The Only Thing That Haunts This House Is Me" – 3:07
9. "The Sound of Young America" – 3:07
10. "...Run, Brother, Run..." – 3:34
11. "The Hotbed of Life" – 3:21

== Personnel ==
Personnel per booklet.

Fireworks

- David Mackinder – vocals
- Adam Mercer – keyboard
- Christopher Mojanorski – guitar
- Brett Jones – guitar
- Kyle O'Neil – bass
- Tymm Rengers – drums

Production

- Brian McTernan – engineer, producer, mixing
- Ryan Smith – mastering
- Michael Egave Burdick – illustrations
- John Regan – design, layout

== Chart performance ==
Chart (2014)	Peak position
U.S. Billboard 200	148
U.S. Billboard Heatseekers Albums	1
U.S. Billboard Independent Albums	33
U.S. Billboard Top Rock Albums	40
U.S. Billboard Vinyl Albums	5
