= Road Maps and Heart Attacks =

Studio album by This Time Next Year
- Released: October 20, 2009
- Genre: Pop punk
- Length: 31:17
- Label: Equal Vision
- Producer: Brian McTernan

This Time Next Year chronology
The Longest Way Home (2008)	Road Maps and Heart Attacks (2009)	Drop Out of Life (2011)

Professional ratings
Review scores
Source	Rating
AbsolutePunk	70%
Punknews.org	3/5 stars

Road Maps And Heart Attacks is the debut studio album from rock band This Time Next Year. It was released on October 20, 2009 through Equal Vision Records. The album was produced by Brian McTernan, who worked with The Movielife. On April 7, 2010, it was announced the band made Road Maps and Heart Attacks available for pay-what-you-want download.

== Track listing ==
1. "Rise and Fall, Curtain Call" - 2:19
2. "New Sensation" - 2:28
3. "Alex in Wonderland" - 3:43
4. "New Florence" - 2:08
5. "Rhyme and Reason" - 2:34
6. "No Bed of Broken Glass" - 2:42
7. "Calling in Dead" - 2:56
8. "Liquid Diet" - 3:04
9. "Mischief with No Direction" - 3:12
10. "Out on Eastern" - 2:38
11. "Cheers to a Late Night" - 3:33
