= Thirteen Day Getaway =

Studio album by CIV
- Released: April 7, 1998
- Recorded: 1997–1998
- Genre: Punk rock; pop-punk
- Length: 32:10
- Label: Lava; Atlantic
- Producer: Michael Barbiero; John Goodmanson; Steve Thompson

CIV chronology
| Set Your Goals (1995) | Thirteen Day Getaway (1998) | Solid Bond: The Complete Discography (2009) |

Singles from Thirteen Day Getaway
- 1. "Secondhand Superstar" Released: May 11, 1998

Professional ratings
Review scores
| Source | Rating |
|---|---|
| AllMusic | 3/5 stars |
| Melody Maker | 3.5/5 stars |
| Hit Parader | B |
| MusicHound Rock | 1/5 stars |
| Pitchfork | 1.0/10 |
| Rock Hard | 7.5/10 |

Thirteen Day Getaway is the second and final studio album by the punk rock band CIV. It was released on April 7, 1998, on major labels Lava and Atlantic Records. The album is dedicated to Raybeez.

== Critical reception ==
The Plain Dealer wrote that "Civ's clean, moderately paced, somewhat melodic pop punk, topped by Anthony Civorelli's monotonous, nasal vocals, makes the group sound like hundreds of other post-Green Day pop punk bands." The San Diego Union-Tribune called the album "top-loaded with songs that suggest CIV knows how to spike pop hooks with a punk charge, to use melody rather than refuse it."

== Track listing ==
1. "Secondhand Superstar" – 2:44
2. "Big Girl" – 2:49
3. "Itchycoo Park" – 2:21
4. "Haven't Been Myself in a While" – 2:36
5. "Everyday" – 3:08
6. "Shout It" – 2:30
7. "Owner's Manual" – :34
8. "Something Special" – 2:38
9. "Using Someone Else" – 2:17
10. "It's Not Your Fault" – 2:22
11. "Living Life" – 2:00
12. "Ordinary" – 2:40
13. "Little Men" – 3:31

"What Happened to the Grunge?" (Hidden track) – 3:14

== Personnel ==
CIV

- CIV (Anthony Civarelli) - Vocals
- Charlie Garriga - Guitar/Backing Vocals
- Arthur Smilios - Bass/Backing Vocals
- Sammy Siegler - Drums

Production

- Michael Barbiero - Producer, Mixing
- Greg Calbi - Mastering
- John Goodmanson - Producer, Engineer, Mixing
- Steve Thompson - Producer, Mixing
- Mark Mitchell - Mixing Assistant
- Scott Gormley - Assistant Engineer
- Brian Sperber - Mixing Assistant
- Eva Mueller - Photography
- Chip Verspyck - Assistant Engineer
- Ian Love - Engineer
