= Drop Out of Life =

Studio album by This Time Next Year
- Released: September 27, 2011
- Genre: Pop punk
- Length: 42:19
- Label: Equal Vision
- Producer: Chad Gilbert

This Time Next Year chronology
Road Maps and Heart Attacks (2009)	Drop Out of Life (2011)

Singles from Drop Out of Life
- 1. "Drop Out of Life" Released: Q4 2011; 2. "Note" Released: October 23, 2012

Drop Out of Life is the second and final studio album by American pop punk band This Time Next Year. In October and November, the band supported New Found Glory on their Pop Punk's Not Dead tour of the U.S.

== Reception ==
Professional ratings
Review scores
Source	Rating
AbsolutePunk	80%
Alternative Press	4.5/5 stars

Drop Out of Life was met with mostly positive review from critics. Thomas Nassiff from AbsolutePunk notes how it is a significant departure in sound from the band's previous album, Road Maps and Heart Attacks.

== Track listing ==
No.	Title	Length
1.	"Drop Out of Life"	3:49
2.	"Better Half"	3:00
3.	"Living Hell"	3:09
4.	"Last Call"	3:13
5.	"Modern Day Love Story"	2:55
6.	"Spoontonic"	3:29
7.	"Matchbook"	3:04
8.	"My Side of Town"	3:25
9.	"Get It, Got It, Good"	2:46
10.	"Note"	3:31
11.	"This Is an Airport Train"	3:34
12.	"The Afterlife" (hidden)	3:01
13.	"Whiskey and Coke" (hidden)	3:30
