= Mutiny! (Set Your Goals album) =

2006 album by Set Your Goals

Studio album by Set Your Goals
- Released: July 11, 2006
- Recorded: February – March 2006
- Studios: The Laundry Room, Seattle, Washington
- Genres: Easycore; pop-punk
- Length: 29:36
- Label: Eulogy
- Producers: Barrett Jones, Set Your Goals

Set Your Goals chronology
Steal Your Goals (2006)	Mutiny! (2006)	This Will Be the Death of Us (2009)

Mutiny! is the debut studio album by American rock band Set Your Goals. Within the first three months of 2006, the band signed to independent label Eulogy Recordings and recorded the album with Barrett Jones in Seattle, Washington. Immediately following recording, the band embarked on two tours across the United States. Before releasing Mutiny in July, the album was preceded by the single release of the title track. The band subsequently toured the US, either as a supporting act or headlining, into mid-2007. After appearing on that year's Warped Tour, the group toured across Europe before closing out the year with another US tour.

At the end of 2007, guitarist Dave Yoha left the band and was replaced by Dan Coddaire. Another round of touring followed, throughout Australia and the UK, before the release of the music video for "Echoes". A deluxe edition of Mutiny! was released before the second stint on the Warped Tour. While firmly a pop-punk album, Mutiny! showcases influences from Lifetime and CIV. The release charted on the lower reaches of the Billboard Independent and Heatseekers component charts. Mutiny! received a positive reaction from music critics, with a few commending the band's constant energy. It has since appeared on a few best-of album lists by Big Cheese, Kerrang! and Rock Sound.

== Background and production ==
Set Your Goals released a self-titled EP through local label Straight On Records in July 2004. The group supported the release with a full US tour, then two separate east and west coast tours later in the year. The band then demoed five songs and shopped them round to record labels; when the demos leaked, the band was persuaded to play the songs live after receiving a positive reaction from fans. Set Your Goals posted a demo of "This Very Moment" on their Myspace profile in May 2005; shortly afterwards, they toured the US with Life Long Tragedy. In August 2005, they went on a cross-country US tour with the Warriors and Summer's End, and then toured with Animosity, Turmoil, and Wait in Vain.

On January 3, 2006, it was announced that the band had signed to independent label Eulogy Recordings. The label announced they would re-issue the band's self-titled EP and release their debut album later in the year. The Warriors A&R person worked for Eulogy; around this time, Set Your Goals were talking to other labels, such as Abacus Recordings. Eulogy first contacted them in June 2005, and sent them their contracts in September 2005. After a few months of re-working the contracts, they formally signed in December 2005. Set Your Goals went on a brief West Coast tour in February 2006 leading up to recording sessions of their debut.

Mutiny! was made at the Laundry Room in Seattle, Washington, between February 20 and March 11, 2006. The sessions were co-produced by Barrett Jones, who also acted as engineer. Brown was previously aware of him through his work on I Am the Avalanche's self-titled (2005); the band lived in an apartment in Washington. Jones played keyboards on "An Old Book Misread" and "Echoes". In addition to their regular instruments, the band members provided additional roles: additional bass guitar by Brown on "Mutiny!", "To Be Continued..." and "Don't Let This Win Over You"; backing vocals by Yoha on "Mutiny!" and Ambrose on "To Be Continued..."; and additional gang vocals by the band. Jones mixed the recordings, before they were mastered by Alan Douches at West West Side studio.

== Composition ==
Set Your Goals is influenced by older melodic hardcore bands such as Lifetime and CIV, with elements of newer acts like the Movielife, New Found Glory, Rufio and Bodyjar. While their self-titled EP displayed a fair mix of hardcore punk and pop-punk, Mutiny! leans more towards the latter genre with elements of the former. They borrowed the catchy melodies from pop punk and combined them with the gang vocals, slow breakdowns and faster tempo of hardcore punk. Additionally, the vocals are akin to those sung by New Found Glory, and the chord progressions sound very similar to those performed by Lifetime on their album Jersey's Best Dancers (1997). For the writing process, Brown would write guitar riffs, which he would then show to Ambrose, who would arrange them and add drum parts. Wilson and Brown would then propose a relatable theme, before showing it to the rest of the band. The pair would write free-form essays and select lines to use as lyrics. Avoiding typical themes of heartbreak, Mutiny! tackles the themes of taking risks, forced influence and credibility.

Discussing the album's title, Brown explained how they were a "young, impressionable band", being told to alter their songs, and its "like a coming of age [story] and being like, 'Hey, we’re old enough to make an impression now, let’s takeover.'" Alongside this, Brown said "we chose Mutiny! because we like to have fun and pirates are fun". "Work in Progress" begins with an acoustic intro, before it builds "into an abrupt explosion of electric power and force". Brown said the song was written while they were under pressure while recording the album. "We Do It for the Money, Obviously!" is about detractors from the hardcore scene who thought the group didn't have punk credibility. "Mutiny!" is about the music industry and an unnamed individual from an independent record label who told the band they needed to write more choruses. The song's spoken word section is taken from one of Brown's essays; it was initially longer, before being trimmed. "This Song Is Definitely Not About a Girl" is about the misinterpretation of "Latch Key", an older track on the band's self-titled EP, which people mistakenly thought was about a relationship. The next track, "An Old Book Misread", talks about how no single religion is more important than any other. Brown said he had been raised in a Christian household, "but it was time we cleared things up, as my beliefs have obviously shifted immensely from what I had been taught". "Flight of the Navigator" deals with being on tour, living in a van together; "To Be Continued..." is about relationships and friendships affected by touring. The album concludes with "Echoes", a song about dealing with the death of someone a person is close to.

== Release and promotion ==
An e-card was posted online with two songs from the forthcoming album. On June 11, 2006, the music video for "Mutiny!", directed by Kevin Wildt, was posted on Alternative Press's website. Brown said it stars them as an act that was "supposed to be the next big thing. It actually chronicles what we were going through with the whole label process". During a UK tour, Set Your Goals and the Steal released a split 10". Mutiny! was released on July 11, 2006, through Eulogy Recordings; the Japanese edition, released on August 5, included "Goonies Never Say Die!" (from the self-titled EP) and a cover of the Gorilla Biscuits track "Forgotten" as bonus tracks, along with a DVD containing two music videos. The vinyl edition was first released through Double or Nothing Records. On December 24, 2007, the band announced that Yoha had left Set Your Goals as he no longer wanted to tour full time. He was temporarily replaced by Dan Coddaire, who he had replaced.

On March 26, 2008, a music video was released for "Echoes" on the band's Myspace account. Set Your Goals were contacted by Etypical Films in December 2006, who was interested in making a music video for one of the album's tracks. The band put up a poll in Myspace for which one to make a video for, and while they tried to raise funds to shoot both "To Be Continued..." and "Echoes", the latter was ultimately done. It was subsequently filmed in December 2007 and directed by Adam Patch of Etypical Films. Eulogy Recordings re-pressed the album on vinyl on April 29, 2008. A deluxe edition of the album with five demos and a video was released on May 27, 2008. Guitarist Audelio Flores, Jr. said this was done because the original pressing had sold out. Since the group lacked new material, they opted to give their label their demos and a music video. In 2009, the band released the video album Mutiny! In the U.K.; it consists of footage from their 2007 European tour, shot by videographer Ben Thornley of production company Sitcom Soldiers. It was originally released digitally in October 2007 in two parts, one on AbsolutePunk and the other on Punknews.org.

== Touring ==
After recording finished, Set Your Goals played a handful of shows across the country in March and April 2006. The band's trailer had been stolen, prompting the cancellation of the first three shows. Following this, they went a three-week tour with Crime in Stereo and With or Without You in April 2006, and supported Ignite across the US, until June 2006. In May 2006, the group embarked on a European tour with the Steal. It was promoted with a West Coast US tour with the Distance, and three shows with Gorilla Biscuits in August 2006. The group then embarked on a headlining US tour in September and October, where they were supported by No Trigger and the Distance. In between some of these shows, they played acoustic sets. For the remainder of October, they supported Less Than Jake for a handful of shows. In November, the band went on a Midwest and West coast tour with Terror. Some of the shows were cancelled when the band was involved in a van accident where they hit a deer, damaging their vehicle in the process.

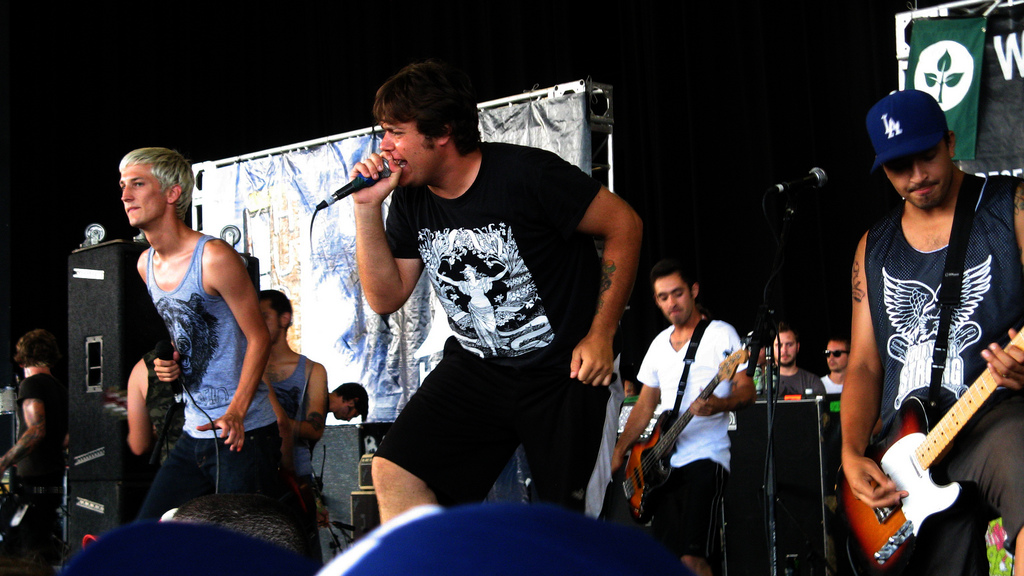
Set Your Goals performing on the 2008 Warped Tour

In January and February 2007, the band performed a few shows with Senses Fail and Saosin. In February and March, the band went on a tour of North America with support from Every Second Counts, Save Yourself and Fireworks. However, in early March the band were involved in a van accident which resulted in them dropping the remainder of their March headlining dates. They recovered in time to support Anti-Flag on their War Sucks... tour in late March and April, and played a series of shows with CDC. Following this, they went on a Canadian tour with Daggermouth, No Trigger, and Hostage Life, and then toured alongside Drop Dead, Gorgeous on their US West Coast tour. In May and June, the band went on a headlining tour of the US with support from Just Surrender, Driving East and Fireworks. From late June to late July, the band performed on the Warped Tour. Between July and September, the group embarked on a headlining European tour, with support from No Trigger.

In October and November 2007, the band supported New Found Glory and Senses Fail on their co-headlining tours of the US. In between shows, they also supported Paramore and the Starting Line. In January 2008, the group went on a tour of Australia with Silverstein. In February and March, the band toured the UK with Gallows, Fucked Up and Short Sharp Shock. Between late March and early May, the group toured as part of the Bamboozle Roadshow. The band then appeared at the Bamboozle Left festival in April, and at the Give it a Name festival in the UK and the Groezrock festival in Belgium in May. They played a handful of Midwest and West Coast shows with I Am the Avalanche, Hit the Lights, 2*Sweet, and the Years Gone By. Between June and August 2008, the band performed on the Warped Tour again. Jon Strader and Erik Perkins, both of No Trigger, took up guitar and drums for Set Your Goals during this trek. They performed at the LiskFest festival in California, prior to supporting New Found Glory on their tour of the UK in November 2008. The band went on a brief holiday tour, titled Setting the Records Straight Tour alongside Four Year Strong, Every Avenue and Energy in December.

== Reception ==
Professional ratings
Review scores
Source	Rating
AllMusic	4/5 stars
Ox-Fanzine	7/10
Punknews.org	4.5/5 stars
Sputnikmusic	3/5

=== Critical response ===
Mutiny! was praised by most music critics. Meg Reinecker of Punknews.org also noted the high-energy throughout the release. She praised the album's momentum, referring to it as "impeccable from start to finish, fitting together like a puzzle". She noted, "Set Your Goals aren't singing about how cute girls are or how much school sucks. They're tackling selling out, being force-fed religion, maintaining relationships with family and friends, and taking risks in life." AllMusic reviewer Corey Apar said that while the album begins with "a somewhat misleading start" during the intro of "Work in Progress", the group "never lets up" throughout the remainder of the record. He noted that the band performs with enough urgency and passionate energy that they "remind tired ears what can be so great and engaging about simple punk music in the first place".

Vincent Chung for Punk Planet said that it continued the melodic hardcore lineage started by Gorilla Biscuits, with a "slight flavor of hardcore's aggressive edge, clearly marketed towards the Fuse and Alternative Press crowd". Ox-Fanzine writer Lauri Wessel complimented the "pleasant way" in which the group combines "melodic punk rock ... with old school hardcore". He singled out "Work in Progress" and "An Old Book Misread" as examples of "rousing" energy, joined by "good melodies" in the verse sections, typically "dissolv[ing] into beautiful singalongs in the choruses". Sputnikmusic staff member Nick Greer applauded the mix of hardcore and pop punk, calling it "deadly catchy" and coming across as "incredibly fresh and enjoyable". Though his "immediate reaction" to the majority of the material was "overwhelmingly positive", he lost interest after a few playbacks, highlighting the centre of the album where it "drags after repeated listens".

=== Accolades and aftermath ===
Mutiny! charted on two Billboard component charts: number 46 on Independent Albums, and number 47 on the Heatseekers Albums.

Big Cheese ranked Mutiny! at number 24 on their list of top 50 albums of 2006, while Punknews.org included it at number 11 on their list of the year's 20 best releases. It later featured on three best-of pop punk album lists: number 31 on BuzzFeed's 36 Pop Punk Albums You Need To Hear Before You F——ing Die; number 46 on Rock Sound's The 51 Most Essential Pop Punk Albums of All Time; and number 49 on Kerrang!'s The 51 Greatest Pop-Punk Albums of All Time. Similarly, NME listed the title track as part of their Essential Pop Punk Playlist.

In 2015, Wilson revealed that Eulogy Recordings had not paid the band any royalties for the album or merchandise sales. Independent label Epitaph Records bought the band out of the remainder of their contract, however, a portion of it was paid up-front with the remainder being recouped via sales of This Will Be the Death of Us (2009). In November and December 2016, the band went on a 10th anniversary tour for the album, performing it in its entirety. Coinciding with this, Smartpunk Records re-pressed the album on vinyl.

== Track listing ==
Track listing per booklet. All recordings produced by Barrett Jones and Set Your Goals.

No.	Title	Length
1.	"Work in Progress"	2:13
2.	"We Do It for the Money, Obviously!"	0:53
3.	"Dead Men Tell No Tales"	0:58
4.	"Mutiny!"	4:03
5.	"This Song Is Definitely Not About a Girl"	2:58
6.	"An Old Book Misread"	3:53
7.	"This Very Moment"	2:35
8.	"Flight of the Navigator"	2:48
9.	"To Be Continued..."	3:54
10.	"Don't Let This Win Over You"	1:00
11.	"Echoes"	4:25
Total length:		29:36

== Personnel ==
Personnel per booklet.

Set Your Goals

- Jordan Brown – lead vocals, guitar, additional bass guitar (tracks 4, 9 and 10)
- Matt Wilson – lead vocals
- Dave Yoha – guitar, additional backing vocals (track 4)
- Joe Saucedo – bass guitar
- Mike Ambrose – drums, percussion, additional backing vocals (track 9)

Additional musicians

- Barrett Jones – keyboards (tracks 6 and 11)
- Set Your Goals – additional gang vocals

Production

- Barrett Jones – recording, engineer, mixing, producer
- Set Your Goals – producer
- Alan Douches – mastering

== Charts ==
Chart performance for Mutiny!
Chart (2006)	Peak position
US Heatseekers Albums (Billboard)	47
US Independent Albums (Billboard)	46
