= The Sheds =

American ska punk band

The Sheds were an American ska punk band from Agoura Hills, California, active from 2005 to 2015.

== History ==
The Sheds released their first EP in 2011 titled ...And Now for Something Completely Different. The Sheds released their second EP titled Self/Doubt in 2012 via Mediaskare Records. The sheds released their first and only full-length album titled I'll Be Fine in 2013 via Mediaskare Records. The album was produced by Nicky Zinner.

The song "Bad Things Are Bad" was featured on the Tony Hawk's Pro Skater 5 soundtrack in 2015.

== Members ==
- Mac Miller : lead vocals, guitar
- Trey Hales : guitar, backing vocals
- Jonathan McMaster : bass, screamo vocals
- Morgan Miller : second guitar
- Mark Blaker : drums
