= Set Your Goals (album) =

Studio album by CIV
- Released: October 1995
- Recorded: 1994–1995
- Genres: Punk rock; melodic hardcore; hardcore punk
- Length: 31:13
- Label: Lava
- Producers: Don Fury; Walter Schreifels

CIV chronology
| Set Your Goals (1995) | Thirteen Day Getaway (1998) |

Professional ratings
Review scores
| Source | Rating |
|---|---|
| AllMusic | 3/5 stars |
| MusicHound Rock | 2.5/5 stars |

Set Your Goals is the debut studio album by the punk rock band CIV. It was released in October 1995 on Lava Records. The album is best known for the hit single "Can't Wait One Minute More."

Although listed as co-producer in the inlay, Walter Schreifels has indicated that he was the main songwriter for the album (despite not being a member of the band).

"Can't Wait One Minute More" and "Choices Made" were released as music videos.

"Can't Wait One Minute More" features vocals from Lou Koller of Sick Of It All.

The San Francisco Bay-area pop punk/hardcore act Set Your Goals named themselves after this album.

== Critical reception ==
Ira Robbins, in Trouser Press, wrote: "Making the most of clear sound, tight, unfussy playing and a full complement of rhythmic shifts (these guys remember when moshing was a dance tempo, not a slamming catch-all), CIV recycles with detailed dignity."

== Track listing ==
1. "Set Your Goals" - 1:51
2. "Do Something" - 1:14
3. "So Far, So Good... So What" - 2:12
4. "State of Grace" - 1:00
5. "Can't Wait One Minute More" - 2:32
6. "Trust Slips Through Your Hands - 1:13
7. "Gang Opinion" - 1:29
8. "Choices Made" - 2:29
9. "Solid Bond" - 1:34
10. "Marching Goals" - :33
11. "United Kids" - 2:19
12. "Soundtrack for Violence" - :32
13. "Boring Summer" - 2:47
14. "Et Tu Brute?" - 2:17
15. "All Twisted" (Kraut cover) - 2:31
16. "Don't Got to Prove It" - 1:57
17. "Blessed" - 2:30 (A track hidden in "Don't Got to Prove It")

== Personnel ==
CIV

- CIV (Anthony Civarelli) - Vocals
- Charlie Garriga - Guitar, backing vocals
- Arthur Smilios - Bass, backing vocals
- Sammy Siegler - Drums

Guests

- Lou Koller - vocals on "Can't Wait One Minute More"

Production

- Michael Barbiero - Mixing
- Don Fury - Producer, engineer
- Walter Schreifels - Producer, songwriter
- George Marino - Mastering
- Chris Gibson - Engineer

Artwork

- Marcelo Krasilcic - Photography
- John Mockus - Photography
- Chris Capuozzo - Design

== Charts ==
Album - Billboard (United States)

| Year | Chart | Position |
|---|---|---|
| 1995 | Heatseekers | 11 |

Billboard 200 (United States) Position 184

Singles - Billboard (United States)

| Year | Single | Chart | Position |
|---|---|---|---|
| 1995 | "Can't Wait One Minute More" | Modern Rock Tracks | 21 |
