= Set Your Goals (EP) =

EP by Set Your Goals
- Released: 2004
- Recorded: April–May 2004
- Genre: Melodic hardcore, pop punk
- Length: 12:41
- Label: Straight On

Set Your Goals chronology
Set Your Goals (2004)	Steal Your Goals (2006)

Professional ratings
Review scores
Source	Rating
AllMusic	1.5/5 stars
Punknews.org	3/5 stars

Set Your Goals is an EP by American rock band, Set Your Goals, released in 2004 by Straight On. It was reissued by Eulogy under the name Reset in April 2006. The reissue includes a bonus track.

The rights to the pressing of the EP were won back from Eulogy in 2014, and a 10th anniversary edition was issued the same year on 10" vinyl by Calaveras Records, owned by the band's vocalist, Matt Wilson.

Set Your Goals was recorded on April 14, and May 20 and 26, 2004, by Zack Ohren at Castle Ultimate Studios in Oakland, California.

== Track listing ==
All of the songs were written by Set Your Goals, with the exception of "Do You Still Hate Me?" which was written by Jawbreaker in 1994.

1. "Reset" - 1:21
2. "How 'Bout No, Scott?" (Feat. Israel Branson & Mikey Ambrose) - 1:18
3. "Goonies Never Say Die!" (Feat. Donny Shot) - 2:59
4. "Sharptooth" - 1:12
5. "Latch Key" (Feat. Chris Clark & Andrew DiMaggio) - 3:03

Reissue bonus track

6. "Do You Still Hate Me?" - 2:51

== Personnel ==
Personnel per booklet.

Set Your Goals

- Jordan Brown – lead vocals, guitar
- Matt Wilson – lead vocals
- Israel Branson – bass, additional vocals (track 2)
- Michael Ambrose – drums, additional vocals (track 2)

Additional musicians

- Donny Shot – guest vocals (track 3)
- Chris Clark – guest vocals (track 5)
- Andrew Dimaggio – guest vocals (track 5)

Production and design

- Zack Ohren – recording
- Gaelyn Mangrum – graphic design
