= This Time Next Year (band) =

American pop punk band

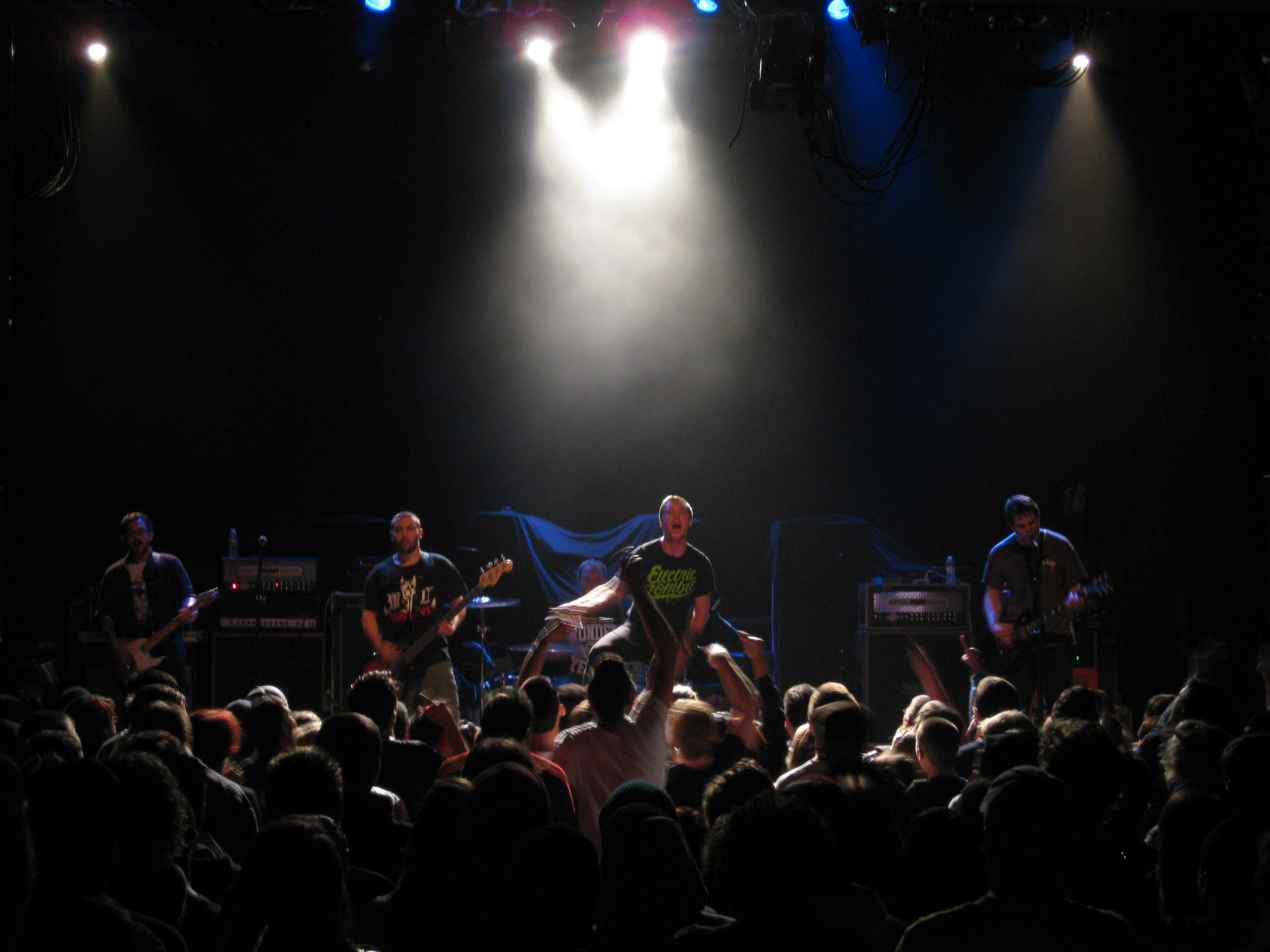
- Left to right: Cohen, Pacheco, Jalili, Dowdalls, and Wiseman in 2011

Background information
- Origin: Walnut Creek, California
- Genre: Pop punk
- Years active: 2006–2012
- Labels: Escapist; Run for Cover; Equal Vision
- Past members: Pete Dowdalls; Brad Wiseman; Denis Cohen; Travis Pacheco; James Jalili
- Website: thistimenextyearca.com

This Time Next Year was an American pop punk band formed in Walnut Creek, California They released three EPs and two full-length albums.

== History ==
=== Early releases and debut album (2006–10) ===
This Time Next Year was a pop-punk band from Walnut Creek, California. They lasted for about six years from December 30, 2006 until December 7, 2012, where they played their final show at Chain Reaction in Anaheim, CA. This Time Next Year take their name from the album of the same name released by The Movielife. The band recorded a five-song demo with Zach Ohren and self-released it in 2006. In January 2007, they went on a short Californian tour with Robot Eyes. In May 2007 the band entered Nu-Tone Studios with producer William Samuels to record their EP A Place for You for Escapist Records. In June 2007, they appeared at Sincerity Fest. The EP was released in early Summer of 2007. In July and August, the band went on a tour of the U.S. alongside 2*Sweet and Anchorless. In March 2008, the band went ona West Coast tour with Thieves and Villains. In June and July 2008, the band went on tour with 2*Sweet and Fireworks. On June 16, the band made A Place for You and The Longest Way Home EPs available for streaming on their PureVolume profile. On June 30, a music video for "Alex in Wonderland" premiered through Alternative Press. The Longest Way Home was released through Run for Cover Records on July 22.

In October and November, the band went on tour with 2*Sweet, Anarbor and Fireworks. On November 18, it was announced that the band had signed to independent label Equal Vision Records. In the same announcement, it was mentioned that the band wasin the process of recording their debut album with producer Brian McTernan, which was planned for release in 2009. Alternative Press named This Time Next Year one of their "100 Bands You Need To Know in 2009". In early March 2009, the band finished recording their debut album. Later that month, the band went on a tour of the US with Fireworks. A Loss for Words, Title Fight and Transit appeared on select dates. In April, the band went on tour with Racing Kites, Sparks the Rescue and the Dangerous Summer. Following this, the band performed a handful of shows with the Swellers. In June, the band went on tour with A Loss for Words. While on the tour, the band was selling a 7" vinyl which consisted of "New Sensation" and a re-recorded version of "Alex in Wonderland". In July and August, the band supported Fear Before on their Pave the Forest Tour in the US, ad then supported Poison the Well for a handful of shows. In October, This Time Next Year released their debut album Road Maps and Heart Attacks. Alternative Press has also featured the single "New Sensation" in their "Right Brain/Left Brain" feature. In January and February 2010, the band supported Four Year Strong on their headlining US tour. In April 2010, the band supported Set Your Goals on a short West Coast tour, and then went on a short tour with Crime in Stereo and the Swellers. They then played some West coast shows with Transit and A Loss for Words in June 2010.

=== Drop Out of Life and break-up (2011–12) ===
They recorded their second full-length album, "Drop Out of Life", in early 2011 with Chad Gilbert and Paul Miner, at Buzzbomb studios in Los Angeles, California. In October and November, the band supported New Found Glory on their Pop Punk's Not Dead tour in the US. In December, the band supported Set Your Goals on their brief holiday tour. The band were scheduled to appear on the January and February 2012 supporting slot for Four Year Strong's headlining UK tour, however, they had to pull out due to financial issues. This Time Next Year was set to tour Australia in April 2012 along with New Found Glory, The Maine and Taking Back Sunday. In October 2012, This Time Next Year broke up. Brad Wiseman then went on to perform as one half of the band Misser, along with Tim Landers of Transit.

== Band members ==
- Pete Dowdalls – lead vocals
- Brad Wiseman – lead guitar, backing vocals
- Denis Cohen – rhythm guitar
- Travis Pacheco – bass guitar
- James Jalili – drums, percussion

On the album Road Maps and Heart Attacks, Aaron Seminoff is featured as a guest on drums and Anthony Allio on bass guitar. On the EP Demonstration, Jay Scott is featured as a guest on drums and Ryan Creamer on bass guitar.

== Discography ==
List of studio albums
Title	Album details
Road Maps and Heart Attacks	Released: October 20, 2009; Label: Equal Vision (EVR 169); Format: CD, DL, LP
Drop Out of Life	Released: September 27, 2011; Label: Equal Vision (EVR207); Format: CD, DL, LP

List of extended plays
Title	Album details
Demonstration	Released: 2006; Label: Self-released; Format: DL
A Place for You	Released: July 3, 2007; Label: Escapist (ER-004); Format: CD, DL
The Longest Way Home	Released: July 22, 2008; Label: Run for Cover; Format: CD, DL

List of singles
Title	Year	Album
"New Sensation"	2009	Road Maps and Heart Attacks

== Videography ==
Title	Year	Director
"Sweetest Air"	2007	
"Alex in Wonderland"	2009	
"New Sensation"	2010	
"Note"	2012	
