= Fireworks (punk band) =

American pop-punk band

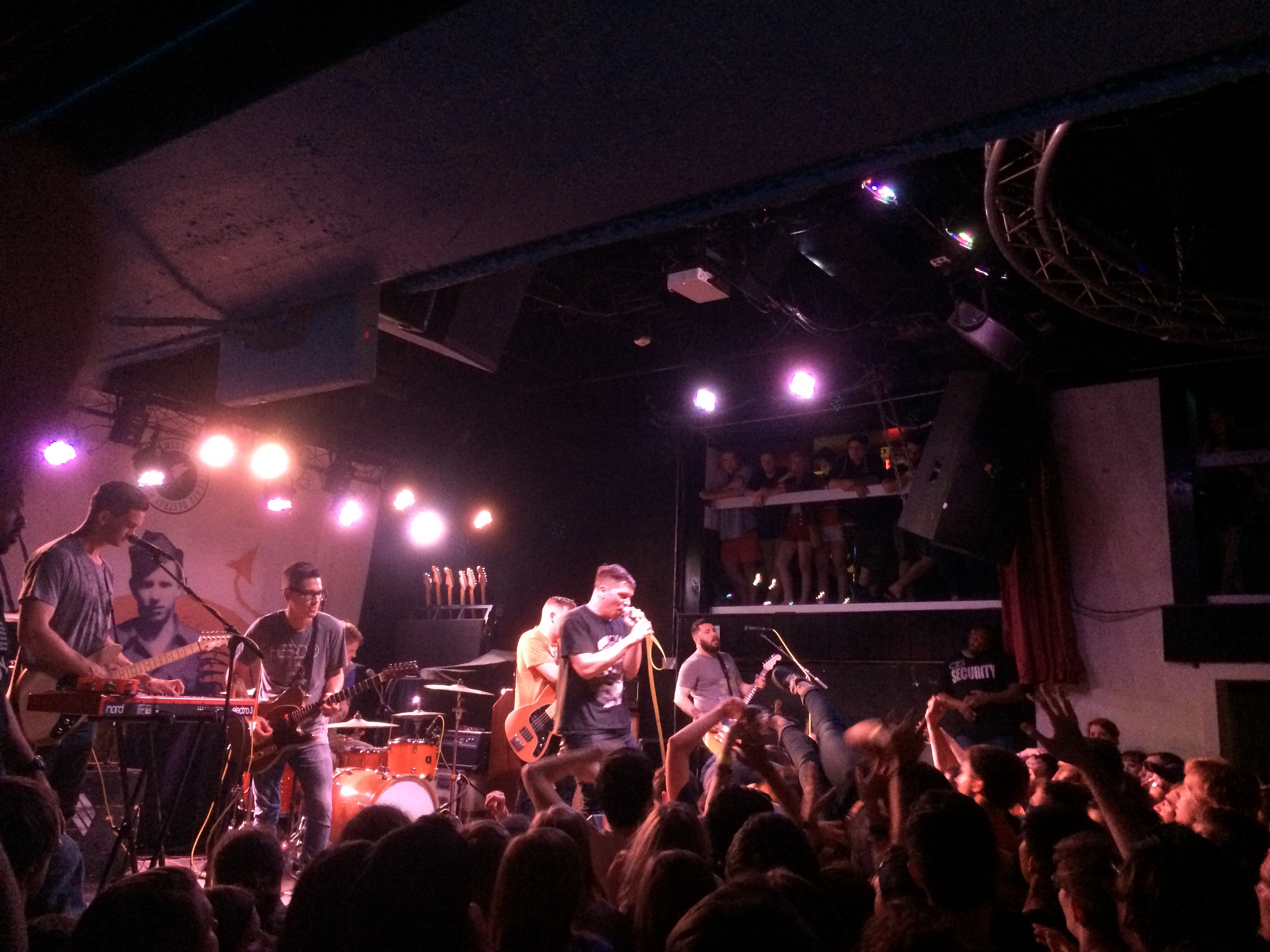
- Fireworks performing at Greene Street Club in Greensboro NC in 2014

Background information
- Also known as: Bears (2004)
- Origin: Metro Detroit, Michigan, U.S.
- Genres: Pop-punk, emo pop, alternative rock
- Years active: 2004–2015, 2019–present
- Labels: Run for Cover, Triple Crown
- Members: Brett Jones; Chris Mojan; David Mackinder; Kyle O'Neil; Adam Mercer; Ted Roberts
- Past members: Tymm Rengers
- Website: higherlonelypower.com

Fireworks is an American pop-punk band from Metro Detroit, Michigan. They are signed to Triple Crown Records and have released four albums and three EPs.

== History ==
=== Early years and debut album (2004–2010) ===
Fireworks was formed in early 2005 around the Metro Detroit area of Michigan. The band recorded a demo entitled 'Can't Hardly Wait' to gain attention from record companies. They signed to the independent label, Run For Cover Records, who released the debut EPs, We Are Everywhere, and Adventure, Nostalgia and Robbery.

In October 2006, they appeared at the Bamboozle Left festival. In January 2007, they went on a West Coast tour with First to Leave, and later appeared at Sincerity Fest. In May and June 2007, they went on tour with Set Your Goals, Just Surrender, and Driving East. They then embarked on the Act Like You Know Tour alongside the White Tie Affair. They went on a second tour with First to Leave in September and October 2007. In December 2007, the band went on the All I Want For X-Mas Is Dudes Tour alongside 2*Sweet and the High Court. In January 2008, they supported the Swellers on their headlining US tour. In June and July 2008, the band went on tour with 2*Sweet and This Time Next Year. Fireworks signed to independent label Triple Crown Records in August 2008. We Are Everywhere was reissued through Triple Crown on October 21.

In March 2009, they released their debut full-length, All I Have to Offer Is My Own Confusion produced by Chad Gilbert of New Found Glory. During the Summer season of 2009, Fireworks supported Four Year Strong and Set Your Goals through America on the Giglife tour. In December 2009 Fireworks set out on their first European tour, supporting Set Your Goals. In January 2010 Fireworks supported New Found Glory and Saves the Day on a full U.S. tour. They then toured Australia with New Found Glory in April as support alongside Hit The Lights before their own headlining tour of the country.

=== Gospel, Oh, Common Life and breakup (2010–2015) ===
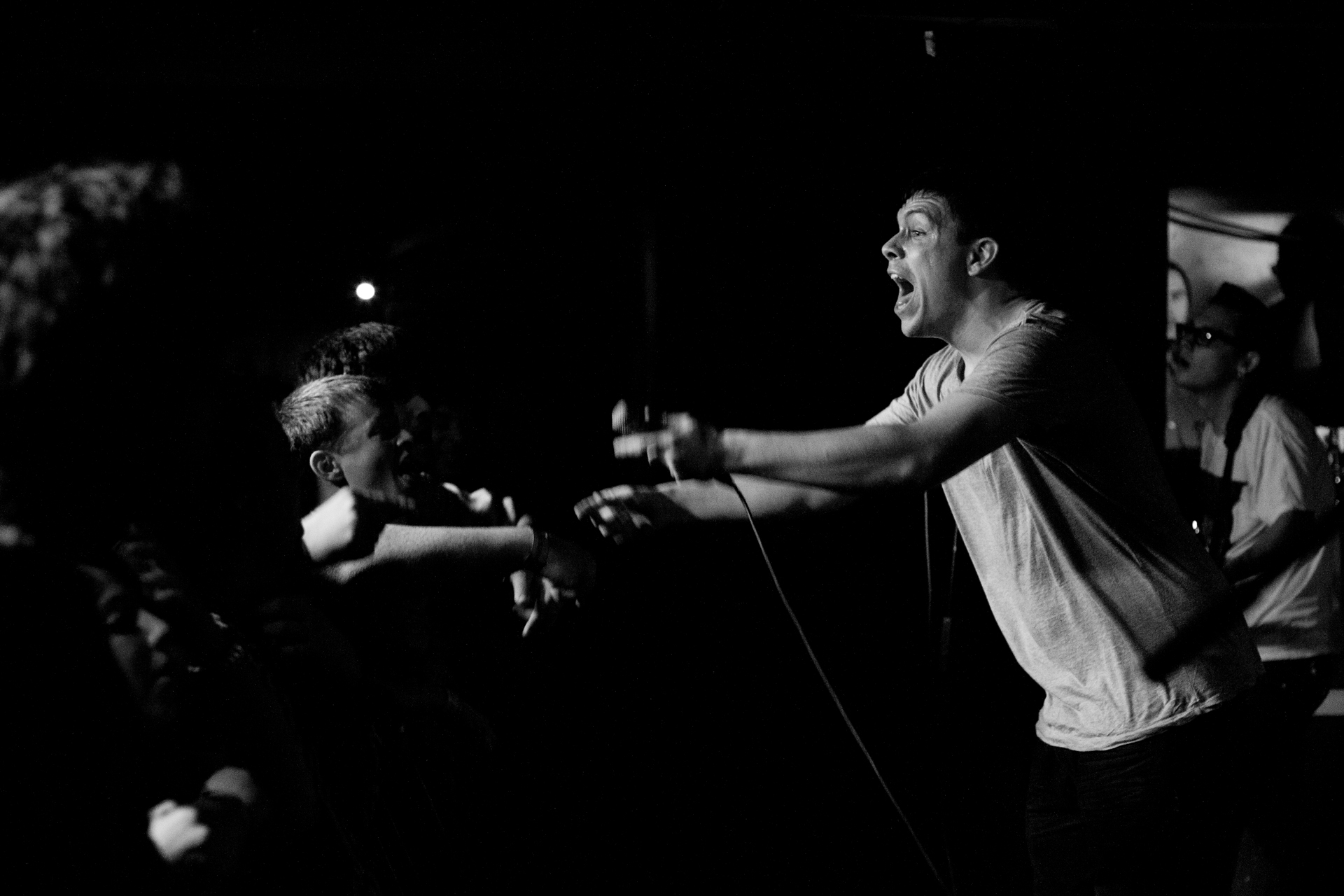
Fireworks performing in 2011

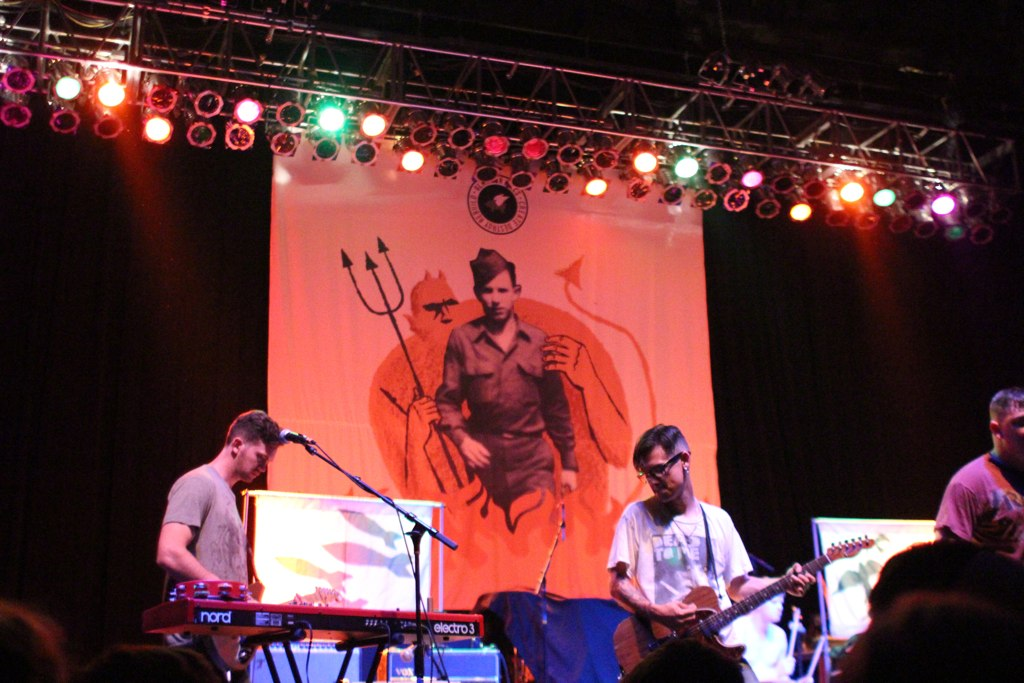
Fireworks performing in 2014

They have released two music videos, one for "Detroit" and another for "Arrows".

Their EP entitled "Bonfires" was released for digital download on December 7, 2010, and their sophomore full length, "Gospel" was released on May 24, 2011.

They toured with Polar Bear Club in the fall of 2011, and shot a video for the song "Arrows," directed by Thom Glunt.

On December 18, 2011, Under the Gun Review voted "Arrows" by Fireworks as the best music video of the year

The band toured for most of 2012, sharing the stage with acts such as Set Your Goals and Cartel. They also played every date of Warped Tour 2012.

In spring 2013, Fireworks supported The Wonder Years on their tour, along with Hostage Calm and Misser.

On January 29, 2014, Fireworks announced their third full-length, Oh, Common Life. The album was released on March 25, 2014. The band also replaced Defeater on The Greatest Generation Tour in the Spring. They band joined The Wonder Years, Real Friends, Citizen, and Modern Baseball.

On May 14, 2015, the band announced on social media that they would be taking an indefinite hiatus following their North American tour.

=== Hiatus (2015–2019) ===
Before the band went on hiatus, Mercer and MacKinder formed the band Empty Houses with vocalist Ali Shea. They signed to Sargent House with the album Daydream, which was released June 2016.

Starting in 2014, drummer Theodore "Teddy" Roberts began playing for Tigers Jaw, becoming a full time member in 2019. Roberts also went on to front his own alt-country band, Teddy Roberts and The Mouths. The group released their debut, "Never Wanna Die", in April 2019.

=== Reunion and Higher Lonely Power (2019–present) ===
On November 8, 2019, Fireworks posted on Twitter for the first time in over two years with a link to https://www.higherlonelypower.com/", which led to a survey of philosophical questions and a new song titled "Demitasse". Later tweets announced a new record, Higher Lonely Power, to be released in 2020. The album was delayed, however, due to the ongoing COVID-19 pandemic. On June 27, 2022, the band tweeted out that their new record would be coming out later in 2022, with it eventually being released January 1, 2023.

== Band members ==
Current members

- David Mackinder – lead vocals (2004–2015, 2019–present)
- Brett Jones – lead guitar, backing vocals (2004–2015, 2019–present)
- Chris Mojan – rhythm guitar, backing vocals (2004–2015, 2019–present)
- Kyle O'Neil – bass (2004–2015, 2019–present)
- Adam Mercer – keyboards, backing vocals, additional guitars (2014–2015, 2019–present; touring musician 2011–2014)
- Teddy Roberts – drums, backing vocals (2014–2015, 2019–present)

Former members

- Tymm Rengers – drums, backing vocals (2004–2014)

== Discography ==
=== Studio albums ===
- All I Have to Offer Is My Own Confusion (2009)
- Gospel (2011)
- Oh, Common Life (2014)
- Higher Lonely Power (2023)

=== Extended plays ===
- We Are Everywhere (2006)
- Adventure, Nostalgia and Robbery (2008)
- Bonfires (2010)

=== Split releases ===
- Save Your Breath vs. Fireworks (2008)

=== Demo ===
- Can't Hardly Wait (2005)
