= The Story So Far discography =

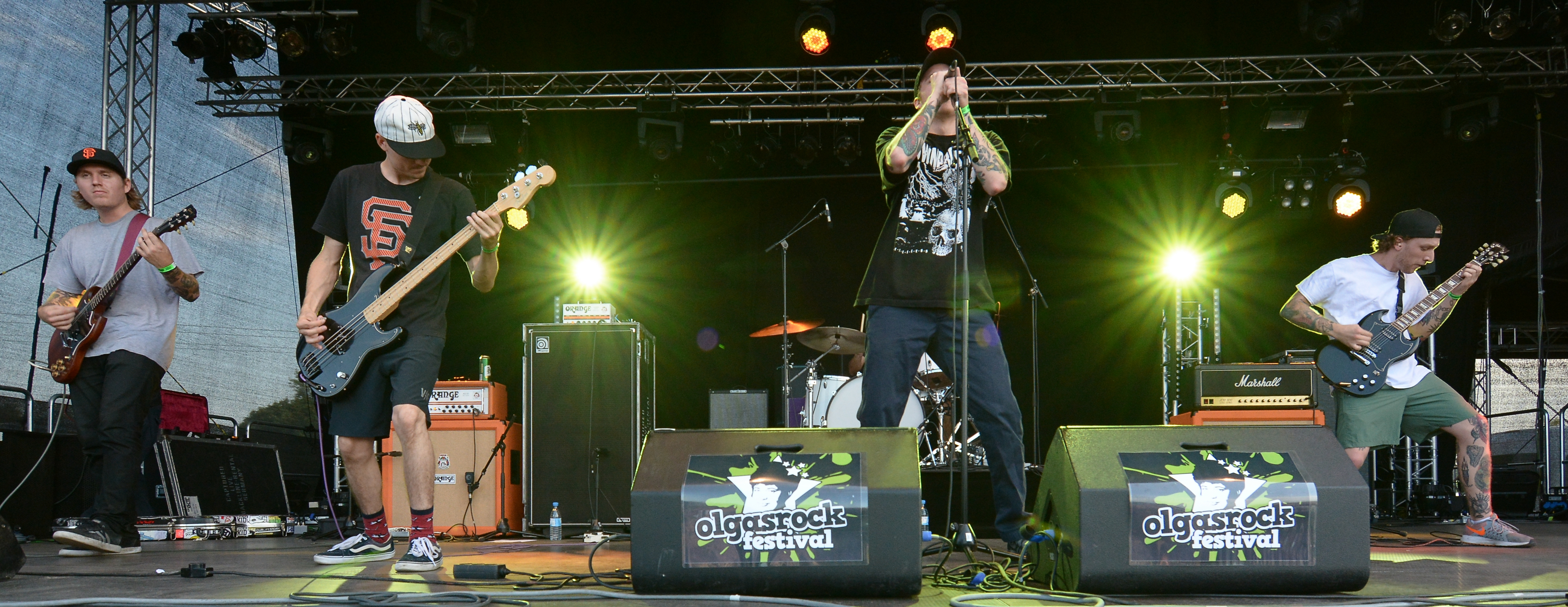
- Studio albums: 5
- EPs: 6
- Singles: 5
- Music videos: 12

The discography of The Story So Far, an American rock band, consists of five studio albums, six extended plays, one live album, and five singles.

== Studio albums ==
List of studio albums
Title	Album details	Peak chart positions		
Title	Album details	US	AUS	UK
Under Soil and Dirt	Released: June 21, 2011; Label: Pure Noise (PNE112); Format: CD, CS, DL, LP	—	—	—
What You Don't See	Released: March 26, 2013; Label: Pure Noise (PNE127); Format: CD, CS, DL, LP	46	—	—
The Story So Far	Released: May 19, 2015; Label: Pure Noise (PNE168); Format: CD, CS, DL, LP	23	35	70
Proper Dose	Released: September 21, 2018; Label: Pure Noise (PNE221); Format: CD, DL, LP	19	55	66
I Want to Disappear	Released: June 21, 2024; Label: Pure Noise (PNE420); Format: CD, DL, LP	78	48	—
"—" denotes a release that did not chart or was not released in that territory.

== Extended plays ==
List of extended plays
Title	Album details	Peak chart positions
Title	Album details	US
5 Songs	Released: December 22, 2007; Label: Self-released; Format: DL	—
While You Were Sleeping	Released: May 11, 2010; Label: Pure Noise (PNE106); Format: CD, CS, DL, 12" vinyl	—
The Story So Far / Maker	Released: November 23, 2010; Label: Pure Noise (PNE108); Format: CS, DL, 7" vinyl	—
The Story So Far / Morgan Foster	Released: May 5, 2011; Label: Barrett (BR-009); Format: DL, 7" vinyl	—
The Story So Far / Stick to Your Guns	Released: June 18, 2013; Label: Pure Noise (PN130); Format: CS, DL, 7" vinyl	—
Songs Of	Released: June 17, 2014; Label: Pure Noise (PN130); Format: CD, CS, DL, 10" vinyl	66
"—" denotes a release that did not chart or was not released in that territory.

== Singles ==
List of singles, showing year released and album name
Title	Year	Album
"Right Here"	2013	What You Don't See
"Heavy Gloom"	2015	The Story So Far
"Out Of It"	2017	Proper Dose
"Big Blind"	2023	I Want to Disappear
"Letterman"	2024	I Want to Disappear
"All This Time"	2024	I Want to Disappear

== Other appearances ==
Title	Year	Album
"Island in the Sun" (Weezer cover)	2010	Just a Quiet Evening Compilation 2011
"Wrightsville Beach" (A Loss for Words cover)	2012	The Glamour Kills Tour Compilation

== Videography ==
List of music videos, showing year released and director
Title	Year	Director
"Quicksand"	2011	James Liberato
"Roam"	2012	
"Empty Space"	2013	Kyle Camarillo
"Clairvoyant"	2014	
"Heavy Gloom"	2016	Kyle Camarillo & Joey Izzo
"Nerve"	2016	Kyle Camarillo
"Upside Down"	2018	
"Take Me as You Please"	2018	Eric Soucy
"Proper Dose"	2019	Elliott Ingham
"Light Year"	2019	Miguel Barbosa
"If I Fall"	2019	Eric Soucy
"Letterman"	2024	Eric Soucy

== See also ==
- List of songs recorded by The Story So Far
