= List of songs recorded by the Story So Far =

The following is a sortable table of all songs by The Story So Far:

== Studio recordings ==
Song	Writer(s)	Album	Producer	Year	Length
"680 South"	—	The Story So Far/Maker (split)	—	2010	2:47
"680 South" (acoustic)^{[A]}	—	The Story So Far/Morgan Foster (split)	—	2011	2:55
"Ali"	—	While You Were Sleeping (EP)	—	2010	3:43
"All Wrong"	Parker Cannon, Kelen Capener, Kevin Geyer, William Levy, Ryan Torf	What You Don't See	Sam Pura, Steve Klein	2013	3:02
"All Wrong" (acoustic)	Parker Cannon, Kelen Capener, Kevin Geyer, William Levy, Ryan Torf	Songs Of (EP)	—	2014	0:37
"Bad Luck"	Parker Cannon, Kelen Capener, Kevin Geyer, William Levy, Ryan Torf	What You Don't See	Sam Pura, Steve Klein	2013	2:21
"Bad Luck" (acoustic)	Parker Cannon, Kelen Capener, Kevin Geyer, William Levy, Ryan Torf	Songs Of (EP)	—	2014	2:38
"Bedhead (Just Like You Said)"	—	While You Were Sleeping (EP)	—	2010	4:09
"Brevity"	—	The Story So Far/Maker (split)	—	2010	0:48
"Clairvoyant"	—	The Story So Far vs Stick to Your Guns (split)	Sam Pura	2013	3:01
"Closure"	The Story So Far	Under Soil and Dirt	Sam Pura	2011	3:21
"Compare and Conform"	—	While You Were Sleeping (EP)	—	2010	4:30
"Daughters"	The Story So Far	Under Soil and Dirt	Sam Pura	2011	3:06
"Distaste"	The Story So Far	The Story So Far	Sam Pura	2015	3:15
"Don't Get Me Wrong"	—	5 Songs (EP)	—	2007	4:12
"Empty Space"	Parker Cannon, Kelen Capener, Kevin Geyer, William Levy, Ryan Torf	What You Don't See	Sam Pura, Steve Klein	2013	2:29
"Face Value"	Parker Cannon, Kelen Capener, Kevin Geyer, William Levy, Ryan Torf	What You Don't See	Sam Pura, Steve Klein	2013	2:52
"Four Years"	The Story So Far	Under Soil and Dirt	Sam Pura	2011	2:44
"Framework"	Parker Cannon, Kelen Capener, Kevin Geyer, William Levy, Ryan Torf	What You Don't See	Sam Pura, Steve Klein	2013	3:08
"Fucked Up"	—	5pm	—	2011	1:45
"Heavy Gloom"	The Story So Far	The Story So Far	Sam Pura	2015	2:50
"High Regard"	The Story So Far	Under Soil and Dirt	Sam Pura	2011	3:51
"How You Are"	The Story So Far	The Story So Far	Sam Pura	2015	3:45
"Intro"	—	5 Songs (EP)	—	2007	2:04
"Island in the Sun" (Weezer cover)	—	Just a Quiet Evening Compilation	—	2010	2:36
"It's 20 More Feet and I Can't Walk It Alone"	—	5 Songs (EP)	—	2007	2:54
"Jud Jud"	—	5 Songs (EP)	—	2007	2:46
"Let it Go"	The Story so Far	Proper Dose	Sam Pura	2018	2:48
"Loro" (Pinback cover)	—	The Story So Far vs Stick to Your Guns (split)	Sam Pura	2013	3:31
"May"^{[A]}	The Story So Far	Under Soil and Dirt	Sam Pura	2011	1:22
"Mock"	The Story So Far	The Story So Far	Sam Pura	2015	3:30
"Mt. Diablo"	—	The Story So Far/Maker (split)	—	2010	3:55
"Mt. Diablo"	The Story So Far	Under Soil and Dirt	Sam Pura	2011	4:09
"Navy Blue"	—	Songs Of (EP)	—	2014	2:52
"Nerve"	The Story So Far	The Story So Far	Sam Pura	2015	3:08
"Out Of It"	The Story So Far	7-inch vinyl single	Sam Pura	2017	2:41
"Phantom"	The Story So Far	The Story So Far	Sam Pura	2015	2:32
"Placeholder"	The Story So Far	Under Soil and Dirt	Sam Pura	2011	3:05
"Playing the Victim"	Parker Cannon, Kelen Capener, Kevin Geyer, William Levy, Ryan Torf	What You Don't See	Sam Pura, Steve Klein	2013	2:50
"Quicksand"	The Story So Far	Under Soil and Dirt	Sam Pura	2011	2:38
"Rally Cap"	—	The Story So Far/Morgan Foster (split)	—	2011	2:02
"Rally Cap"	The Story So Far	Under Soil and Dirt	Sam Pura	2011	2:18
"Right Here"	Parker Cannon, Kelen Capener, Kevin Geyer, William Levy, Ryan Torf	What You Don't See	Sam Pura, Steve Klein	2013	2:35
"Roam"	The Story So Far	Under Soil and Dirt	Sam Pura	2011	2:54
"Scowl"	The Story So Far	The Story So Far	Sam Pura	2015	2:31
"Small Talk"	Parker Cannon, Kelen Capener, Kevin Geyer, William Levy, Ryan Torf	What You Don't See	Sam Pura, Steve Klein	2013	2:43
"Smile"	The Story So Far	The Story So Far	Sam Pura	2015	3:07
"Snyder Street"	—	While You Were Sleeping (EP)	—	2010	4:31
"Solo"	The Story So Far	The Story So Far	Sam Pura	2015	2:37
"Spark Fires"	—	While You Were Sleeping (EP)	—	2010	3:38
"Stalemate"	The Story So Far	The Story So Far	Sam Pura	2015	3:14
"Standing Taller"	—	5 Songs (EP)	—	2007	3:07
"States and Minds"	The Story So Far	Under Soil and Dirt	Sam Pura	2011	0:51
"Stifled"	Parker Cannon, Kelen Capener, Kevin Geyer, William Levy, Ryan Torf	What You Don't See	Sam Pura, Steve Klein	2013	2:12
"Swords and Pens"	The Story So Far	Under Soil and Dirt	Sam Pura	2011	3:09
"Take Me As You Please"	The Story So Far	Proper Dose	Sam Pura	2018	3:43
"The Glass"	Parker Cannon, Kelen Capener, Kevin Geyer, William Levy, Ryan Torf	What You Don't See	Sam Pura, Steve Klein	2013	2:47
"The Glass" (acoustic)	Parker Cannon, Kelen Capener, Kevin Geyer, William Levy, Ryan Torf	Songs Of (EP)	—	2014	3:20
"Things I Can't Change"	Parker Cannon, Kelen Capener, Kevin Geyer, William Levy, Ryan Torf	What You Don't See	Sam Pura, Steve Klein	2013	2:52
"Unlisted Track" (Jawbreaker cover)^{[A]}	—	"Unlisted Track"	—	2011	2:21
"Upside Down"	The Story So Far	Proper Dose	Sam Pura	2018	3:51
"Waiting in Vain" (Bob Marley cover)	Bob Marley	Songs Of (EP)	—	2014	4:16
"Wrightsville Beach" (A Loss for Words cover)	A Loss for Words	The Glamour Kills Tour Compilation	—	2012	2:26

== See also ==
- The Story So Far discography
