= Into It. Over It. / Such Gold =

Into It. Over It. / Such Gold Split

EP by Into It. Over It./Such Gold
- Released: (United States) 20 May 2011
- Genre: Emo revival, indie rock, pop punk
- Length: 10:42
- Label: No Sleep Records, Mightier Than Sword Records

Into It. Over It. chronology
Into It. Over It./CSTVT (2010)	Into It. Over It. / Such Gold Split (2011)	Proper (2011)

Such Gold chronology
Pedestals (2010)	Into It. Over It./Such Gold (2011)	Misadventures (2012)

Professional ratings
Review scores
Source	Rating
Absolute Punk	76%
Alternative Press	3.5/5 stars
Punknews.org	3.5/5 stars

Into It. Over It./Such Gold is a split EP between American Emo revival bands Into It. Over It. and Such Gold. The EP was released on May 20, 2011 through No Sleep Records and Mightier Than Sword Records.

== Track listing ==
No.	Title	Length
1.	"Washington, DC" (Into It. Over It.)	3:21
2.	"Portland, OR" (Into It. Over It.)	2:02
3.	"Minstrels" (Such Gold)	3:04
4.	"The World That You Live In" (Such Gold)	2:13
Total length:		10:42

== Personnel ==
Into It. Over It.

- Evan Thomas Weiss – vocals, guitar, bass

Other Musicians

- Nick Wakim – drums
- Nathan Ellis – backing vocals
- Kate Grube – keyboard/vocals

Such Gold

- Devan Bentley - drums
- Skylar Sarkis - guitar/vocals
- Ben Kotin - vocals
- Nate Derby - guitar
- Devon Hubbard - bass/vocals
