= Misadventure =

A misadventure or accident is an unforeseen and unplanned event or circumstance with negative consequences.

Misadventure may also refer to:

- Misadventure, the formal term for medical error in surgery or other fields of medicine
- Death by misadventure, an inquest verdict
- Misadventures (Pierce the Veil album), 2016
- Misadventures (Such Gold album), 2012
- Misadventure, a 2010 noir novel by Millard Kaufman
- "Misadventure", an episode of the television series The Crown
- Ed, Edd n Eddy: The Mis-Edventures, a 2005 video game
