= Clairvoyant (disambiguation) =

A clairvoyant is someone who allegedly has the power of clairvoyance. Other meanings include:

== Film and television ==
- The Clairvoyant (1924 film), a lost film which featured Sarah Bernhardt in her last performance
- The Clairvoyant (1935 film), starring Claude Rains and Fay Wray
- The Clairvoyant (1982 film), a thriller film starring Perry King
- The Clairvoyant (TV series), British sitcom
- John Garrett (comics), the main antagonist of the television series Agents of S.H.I.E.L.D., where he is known as "The Clairvoyant"

== Music ==
- Clairvoyant, 1986 debut album by guitarist Leni Stern
- "The Clairvoyant" (song), by Iron Maiden, 1988
- "Clairvoyant", 2008 song by Two Steps From Hell from Classics Volume One
- "Clairvoyant", 2013 song by The Story So Far from The Story So Far / Stick to Your Guns
- Clairvoyant (EP), 2014 EP by Jenn Grant
- Clairvoyant (album), 2017 album by The Contortionist
  - "Clairvoyant", 2017 song by The Contortionist from Clairvoyant

== Other uses ==
- Clairvoyant (horse), French Thoroughbred racehorse and sire
