= While You Were Sleeping =

While You Were Sleeping may refer to:

== Film and television ==
- While You Were Sleeping (film), a 1995 American romantic comedy
- While You Were Sleeping (2011 TV series), a South Korean television series
- While You Were Sleeping (2017 TV series), a South Korean television series
- "While You Were Sleeping" (Elementary), a 2012 episode
- "While You Were Sleeping" (The Vampire Diaries), a 2014 episode

== Music ==
- While You Were Sleeping (album), by Classified, 2007
- While You Were Sleeping, a 2010 EP by The Story So Far
- "While You Were Sleeping", a 2005 song by Casting Crowns from Lifesong
- "While You Were Sleeping", a 2010 single by Io Echo
- "While You Were Sleeping", a 2007 song by Sonic Boom Six from Arcade Perfect
