= Be Honest (disambiguation) =

Be Honest may also refer to:

- "Be Honest", a song by Thrasher Shiver from the album Thrasher Shiver
- Be Honest (EP), a 2010 EP by melodic hardcore band No Trigger
