= No Pressure (band) =

American pop-punk band

- Genres: Pop-punk, melodic hardcore
- Years active: 2020–present
- Labels: Triple B; Streets of Hate
- Spinoff of: The Story So Far; Light Years; Regulate
- Members: Parker Cannon; Pat Kennedy; Harry Corrigan
- Website: www.nopressurepunx.com

No Pressure is an American pop-punk supergroup, formed in 2020 by vocalist Parker Cannon, guitarist Pat Kennedy, and drummer Harry Corrigan. Following the release of a self-titled EP in 2020, No Pressure issued its debut studio album, No Pressure, in 2022 and its second album, NP Style, in 2026. The band has toured extensively throughout North America, Europe, Asia, and Australia, and has become a regular presence at hardcore festivals despite primarily performing pop-punk.

== History ==
No Pressure was formed during the COVID-19 pandemic by vocalist Parker Cannon of the Story So Far, guitarist Pat Kennedy of Light Years and drummer Harry Corrigan of Regulate. Cannon started the band while the Story So Far was experiencing a period of inactivity, during which he found himself missing the intimacy, camaraderie, and intensity of the punk and hardcore shows he had attended while growing up. He described No Pressure as a deliberately straightforward project intended not to reinvent pop-punk, but to recapture the rawness and spontaneity of small, community-oriented shows. Kennedy said he enjoyed being able to focus solely on playing guitar, rather than balancing the responsibilities of serving as frontman for his primary band. The band released its self-titled debut EP in 2020, followed by the standalone singles "Bed of Nails" and "Can't Forget" in 2021.

No Pressure made its live debut in October 2021 before undertaking a short U.S. tour in early 2022 and appearing at hardcore festivals including LDB Fest and Repent Fest. Later that year, the band completed its first European headlining tour, performing across the United Kingdom and mainland Europe. Much of No Pressure's self-titled debut album was written collaboratively by Cannon, Kennedy, and Corrigan through informal jam sessions, with Cannon playing bass during the writing process. The album, produced by Ben Hirschfield, was released through Triple B Records on June 1, 2022. In support of the record, the band toured Australia and Asia in early 2023 before returning to Europe and the United States for additional headlining dates. Throughout 2023, No Pressure expanded its festival appearances, performing at Sound and Fury, This Is Hardcore, and When We Were Young. The band returned to Australia in early 2024, toured Japan later that year, and embarked on another European tour in late 2025. In November 2025, No Pressure released the promotional double A-side single "Good Enough" / "Wearing Thin", previewing its next studio album. They supported Drain on U.S. dates in April 2026.

The band's second studio album, NP Style, was released in July 2026 through Triple B and Streets of Hate in North America and via Last Ride Records in Australia. Produced by Jon Markson, the album marked the band's first full-length release in four years.

== Musical style ==
Although its members have strong ties to the hardcore scene and the band is a regular fixture at its festivals, No Pressure primarily plays a raw, aggressive form of pop-punk. The band's music incorporates elements of hardcore and skate punk, emphasizing fast tempos, concise song structures, melodic hooks, and stripped-down production. Its music favors the melodic traditions of bands such as Lifetime, Kid Dynamite, and New Found Glory as opposed to hardcore's heavier breakdowns.

Blink-182 have been cited a major influence on No Pressure. Before writing their's self-titled debut album, the band rehearsed more than 30 of the band's songs from memory, an exercise Cannon said was intended to reconnect the group with the music they loved growing up. No Pressure has since performed live covers of "Josie" and "Carousel". Both Mark Hoppus and Tom DeLonge of the band have publicly expressed admiration for the band.

== Discography ==
Studio albums

- No Pressure (2022)
- NP Style (2026)

EPs

- No Pressure (2020)

Singles

- "Bed of Nails" (2021)
- "Can't Forget" (2021)
- "Say What You Mean" (2023)
- "Good Enough" / "Wearing Thin" (2025)
