= I Want to Disappear =

Studio album by The Story So Far
- Released: June 21, 2024
- Recorded: 2023
- Genre: Pop-punk
- Length: 28:13
- Label: Pure Noise
- Producers: Ben Hirschfield, Jon Markson

The Story So Far chronology
Proper Dose (2018)	I Want to Disappear (2024)

Singles from I Want to Disappear
- 1. "Big Blind" Released: August 4, 2023; 2. "Letterman" Released: March 21, 2024; 3. "All This Time" Released: May 8, 2024

I Want to Disappear is the fifth studio album by American pop punk band The Story So Far. It was released on June 21, 2024, via Pure Noise Records. It is the band's first album without bassist Kelen Capener, who announced his departure in 2022.

== Background ==
Ben Hirschfield served as producer, and recording engineer, with assistance from Eric Chesek, Scott Goodrich, and Jeff Citron. The band's drummer, Ryan Torf, did additional engineering on the tracks. Jon Markson mixed the recordings, with assistance from Rich Costey, before the album was mastered by Ted Jensen, and Brian Gardner. The album artwork was created by Nick Dahlen, and Rob Chiarappa assisted with video production.

== Release ==
The album's first single, "Big Blind", was released on August 4, 2023. It was the band's first song in nearly five years. It was re-recorded and remixed for the album. The second single, "Letterman", was released on March 21, 2024, along with a music video, a newer version of Big Blind with an updated mix, and the official announcement of the album. The album's third single, "All This Time", was released on May 8, 2024. The album, and a music video for "Watch You Go", were both released simultaneously on June 21, 2024.

== Track listing ==
All songs written by the Story So Far.

I Want to Disappear track listing
No.	Title	Length
1.	"All This Time"	2:48
2.	"Watch You Go"	2:10
3.	"Letterman"	3:01
4.	"Jump the Gun"	2:35
5.	"Big Blind (Album version)"	2:27
6.	"Nothing to Say"	2:56
7.	"Keep You Around"	3:50
8.	"You're Still in My Way"	2:33
9.	"White Shores"	3:11
10.	"I Want to Disappear"	2:36
Total length:		28:13

== Personnel ==
The Story So Far

- Parker Cannon – lead vocals
- Kevin Geyer – lead guitar, keyboards, backing vocals
- Will Levy – rhythm guitar
- Ryan Torf – drums, bass, rhythm guitar, engineering

Production

- Ben Hirschfield – production, engineering
- Jon Markson – production, mixing, engineering, mix engineering, bass
- Eric Chesek – additional engineering
- Scott Goodrich – additional engineering
- Jeff Citron – engineering assistance
- Ted Jensen – mastering
- Brian Gardner – mastering
- Rich Costey – mixing

Artwork

- Nick Dahlen – artwork
- Rob Chiarappa – video production assistant

== Charts ==
Chart performance for I Want to Disappear
Chart (2024)	Peak position
Australian Albums (ARIA)	48
Belgian Albums (Ultratop Flanders)	162
Scottish Albums (Official Charts)	13
UK Album Downloads (Official Charts)	51
UK Independent Albums (Official Charts)	3
UK Rock & Metal Albums (Official Charts)	1
US Billboard 200	78
US Independent Albums (Billboard)	15
US Top Rock & Alternative Albums (Billboard)	20
