= Bayonet (band) =

American hardcore punk band

- Origin: New Jersey, U.S.
- Genres: Hardcore punk, melodic hardcore
- Years active: 2009–2013, 2020-present
- Label: Mightier Than Sword
- Members: Buddy Nielsen; Jeremy Comitas; Will Putney; Paul Klein

Bayonet is an American hardcore punk band that formed in 2009. The group features Jeremy Comitas formerly of The Banner, Paul Klein of Suburban Scum, Buddy Nielsen of Senses Fail, and Will Putney of Fit for an Autopsy. Putney is also an established record producer who has engineered albums for Bloodsimple, Suicide Silence and The Human Abstract among others.

On July 26, 2011, Bayonet released their self-titled debut EP through Mightier Than Sword Records. The EP was met with generally favorable reviews. Tim Newbound of Rock Sound gave the release an eight out of ten and commented that the EP features, "full-on, frenetic, galloping songs that deliver massive tunes through the sheer, infectious force of timeless, glorious hardcore," and that it's "more fun than should feasibly be crammed into 10 minutes." Writing for Alternative Press, Jason Schreurs scored the album three out of five stars praising the record's aggression, however he also noted that the EP "gets a little awkward" when vocalist Buddy Nielsen sings with his Senses Fail-style melody, and says that he should "bury his head, let the rage consume him and try to forget about melody altogether." Lyrically, the self-titled EP touches on themes of angst and religion.

On March 28, 2013, Vocalist Buddy Nielsen hinted the break-up of Bayonet, as stated in a KillYourStereo interview, during the release of Senses Fail's latest album Renacer, that "...Bayonet is basically done because there is no need to have that outlet as a side project when it’s now pretty much in Senses Fail."

On September 1, 2020, Buddy confirmed that the band had a new album in the works via the Senses Fail Twitter account, confirming a similar statement made earlier in the year on his personal account.

== Members ==
- Buddy Nielsen – vocals
- Jeremy Comitas – guitar
- Will Putney – bass
- Paul Klein – drums
