= A Loss for Words =

American pop punk band

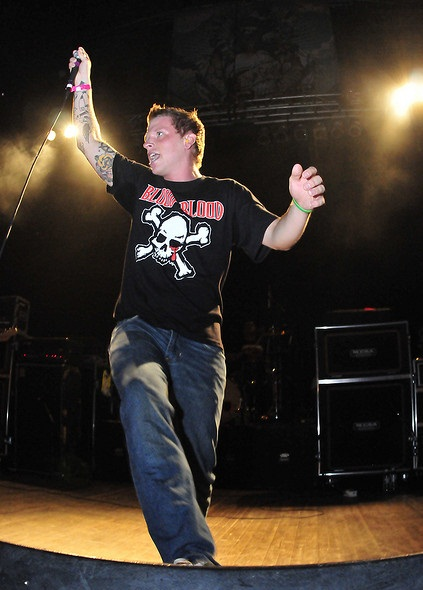
- Matty Arsenault (A Loss for Words singer) live in 2009

Background information
- Also known as: Last Ride (1999–2003)
- Origin: Abington, Massachusetts, U.S.
- Genres: Pop punk, easycore
- Years active: 1999–2015, 2018, 2019, 2021, 2025
- Labels: Rock Vegas; In-n-Out; Ice Grills; Rise; Velocity; No Sleep; Mightier Than Sword
- Past members: Matty Arsenault; Mike Adams; Marc Dangora; Christian Mullen; Kreg Dudley; Chris Murphy; Evan Cordeiro; Adam Souza; Steve Delaney; Danny Poulin; Jack McHugh; Lee Preston; Nevada Smith
- Website: A Loss for Words on Facebook; A Loss for Words on Instagram

A Loss for Words (formerly Last Ride) is an American pop punk band from Abington, Massachusetts.

In 2025, Terry Bezer of Screen Rant included the band in his list of "10 Forgotten Pop-Punk Bands Who Deserve To Be Better Remembered".

== History ==
=== Early years (1999–2004) ===
Matty Arsenault and Danny Poulin from Lions Lions started a new band, Last Ride Pony Rides and, in 1999, it would soon feature Kreg Dudley, Chris Murphy, and Evan Cordeiro. The band had five names listed in a notebook before they changed it, and one of the names was A Loss for Words. The band would change its name to A Loss for Words after attending a minister's service. Mike Adams was soon drafted to play bass after the original bass player had no desire to play in front of people. Marc Dangora, from MAFFUMPH, joined in 2004.

=== Early releases (2004–2007) ===
By April 2004, several tracks were posted on the band's PureVolume account: "Bullets Leave Holes", "Death or Glory", "Rose Colored Lens", "Shoot for Seven", "Faze 3", and "Warren's Eyes". The band recorded 3 songs with Matt Squire in College Park, Maryland, in January 2005. A track listing for a release called Coming Soon to a Theater Near You, released in 2004, was put up in February. In March, it was announced the band were in a studio recording six songs that would be released on an EP, to be released by Rock Vegas, with a planned release month of May. The tracks were finished being mixed by April, and a new release month set, June. Unmastered versions of two tracks, "A Theme for Your Ego" and "Bullets Leave Holes", from the EP were posted online in May. "A Theme for Your Ego" featured guest vocals by Brendan Brown from The Receiving End of Sirens. The band released their first EP on Rock Vegas on 1 July, called These Past 5 Years (2005). The EP sold over 1,000 copies in under two months. They appeared at the Smashachusetts festival in July 2005. On September 23, Rock Vegas revealed the EP sold out in 4 weeks, and that they were repressing it with new disc art.

In February 2006, the band posted "Half Step Down" on their MySpace profile. In April, the band mentioned they were writing some new songs for a new release later in the year. In December, Rock Vegas said the band had finished recording four songs a split release with They Sleep the Dream. By 2007, the band would become an active touring band. The split was released in March 2007; the band later appeared at the End of Summer Jam festival. The band released a cover of Boyz II Men's "Water Runs Dry" on December 5.

Jack McHugh and Nevada Smith would join in 2007.

=== Webster Lake (EP) (2007–2008) ===
From December 14, 2007, to February 2008, the band would be recording their first full-length album. On December 27, 2007, it was announced that the band would record their first album with Nik Tyler and Matt Robnett, at Play/Work Productions. The decision to record at the studio was, as Arsenault comments, "we wanted to record [...] in a studio that would give us a good sound." Recording cost the band $16,000 and as a result, they had to take out a loan. Several guest were announced to be featured on the album: Dan O'Connor and Alan Day from Four Year Strong, Vinnie Caruana from I Am the Avalanche, Sweet Pete from In My Eyes, and Kenny Vasoli from The Starting Line.

Members of both A Loss for Words and Junction 18 created a new band, Snakes in Suits, in late January 2008. A cover of The Movielife's "Face or Kneecaps" was posted on the band's Myspace account, in June.

Two songs that would feature on the band's Webster Lake (2008) acoustic EP were posted on their Myspace, while at the same time it was announced that the EP would be released on June 21. The EP came about while the band was working on The Kids Can't Lose (2009), the band didn't want their fans to get "too bored" as Arsenault recalls, so the band decided to do an acoustic release; Dangora and Adams had some songs they had written so the band went to record them. "Wrightsville Beach", from the EP, was posted on Myspace in late July. The song was named after a location on one of the band's early tours. The band toured throughout October as a support act, with Four Year Strong headlining and two other support acts: I Am the Avalanche, This Is Hell.

=== The Kids Can't Lose and Motown Classics (2008–2010) ===
A teaser for a forthcoming album by the band was posted in early December 2008. Later that month, the band went on tour with Ligeia. The song "40 Thieves" was posted on Myspace in March 2009, as was another song, "Stamp of Approval" in May. The band went on a short tour in mid-March with Fireworks, This Time Next Year, and Title Fight. On March 16, the band were announced to have signed with Japanese label, In-n-Out. On May 9, 2009, the band released The Kids Can't Lose album by themselves; to support the album, the band went on The Kids Can't Lose Tour with We Are the Union, This Time Next Year, Transit and The Status. In August, the band released a music video for "Hold Your Breath", directed by Rob Soucy. The band toured Japan in September with The Vandals and Voodoo Glow Skulls. From late September to late October, the band toured across the U.S. with The Wonder Years and Energy, on The Ghostbustour. Closing the year, the band went on the This Is New England Tour with Vanna, Therefore I Am from late November to mid December. They won Phoenix Magazine's All Ages Band of the year over Boys Like Girls.

In February 2010, it was announced that the band would release a cover album of Motown songs, on May 11 by Paper + Plastick. Around this time, the band had played "My Girl" at recent shows. The band toured the UK with All or Nothing and LYU in March; during these shows the band played several songs off of The Kids Can't Lose and full-band versions of Webster Lake songs. The band went on an acoustic tour, with Man Overboard, Balance & Composure, in April, Motown Classics was released by Paper + Plastick on May 11, with the track listing revealed a few days prior. The album had been produced by Chris Curran with recording taking place at Webster Lake Studios in Boston, Massachusetts. The album came about from the band's interest in Motown songs; Arsenault revealed the band just "picked the hits" and, as Smith mentions, "songs we were familiar with". At the release show for the album, on May 14, at the Palladium in Worcester, Massachusetts, a 5-track sampler was given out to attendees.

The band went on tour from May till July with Transit, Kid Liberty, and Such Gold from May to July. The band toured in the UK in September, with Not Advised and LYU, however, Our Time Down replaced Not Advised before the tour began. The band toured the U.S. with The Ghost Inside, First Blood, Evergreen Terrace, Deez Nuts, and Hundredth on the Returners Tour between October and November. The band toured Europe with Four Year Strong, in November. They closed out the year touring with Such Gold, and Lions Lions.

=== No Sanctuary and Returning to Webster Lake (EP) (2011–2012) ===
In early January, it was announced that the band do a split with Such Gold for release the following month on No Sleep, however, it failed to materialise. On February 10, 2011, they announced signing with Rise/Velocity. The band had previously met a Velocity representative, Dave, who suggested the idea of signing the band with a Rise representative, Craig. The band went on tour with Streetlight Manifesto through the U.S. in February and March. The band went on a tour of the UK with This Time Next Year, supporting Set Your Goals in May. Recording for their Rise/Velocity debut was done in May and June with producer Andrew Wade. As Dangora mentions, the choice of Wade came down to the albums that he worked on previously as they were "really good sonically [...] and we think he can get the best out of us." The album was going to sound similar to their previous album "but improve on it [...] [with] big sounding, loud guitars and catchy vocals." Arsenault, on the other hand, said that Wade was recommended by Dave Shapiro from Velocity. The band went on the 2011 Summer Partery Tour with In Fear and Faith, Vanna, Close to Home, Chunk! No, Captain Chunk!, Ten After Two and Adestria throughout July and August. The band supported Cruel Hand, with The Greenery and Maker, for the Back to School Jam tour in September and October.

The split with Such Gold was planned to be released, before their next album, in September. In mid-September, the artwork and track listing for their next album, under the new name No Sanctuary, was revealed. Originally planned for a September release, the band's third album was planned for release mid-October, before finally being released on October 25. Three bonus tracks were available to those who pre-ordered the album: "Pirouette" (acoustic), "The Recluse" (acoustic), and "You" (bonus vinyl track). The album charted at number 14 on Billboard's Heatseekers Albums chart in the U.S. and received many positive reviews. A couple of songs were available to stream, before the whole album was. The split EP with Such Gold was finally released by on Mightier Than Sword/No Sleep on November 22 on 7" vinyl. Several clips of it were available to stream before its release. The band were planned to support Dance Gavin Dance on the Go Big or Go Home tour, that was to last through November and December, however, it was cancelled, and the band supported Hit the Lights for a few dates in November and December. The band played festivals in December with The Wonder Years and Veara, to close out the year.

The band played a short UK tour in January and February 2012 with Four Year Strong and This Time Next Year. They appeared on Vans Warped Tour 2012 on 2 stages (Acoustic Basement & Tilly's Stage). The band went on the Glamour Kills tour with The Wonder Years, Polar Bear Club, Transit, The Story So Far, and Into It. Over It. from early March to late April 2012. (Note: On one date, Arsenault sang with The Wonder Years for their song "All My Friends Are in Bar Bands".) The band released a video for "Pirouette" on April 12. To promote the tour, a compilation album was released that featured the bands covering one of the other bands' songs. A Loss for Words' contribution was a cover of The Story So Far track "Quicksand". The band went on the Ice Grills Tour 2012 in Japan in April and May with Cleave and After Tonight. An acoustic version of "America Needs a New Sweetheart" was released exclusively on No Sleep's Summer 2012 sampler, release on June 16. On June 19, the acoustic EP, Returning to Webster Lake, was released, and the songs were made available for streaming the same day. The EP consists of acoustic renditions of three No Sanctuary songs, one The Kids Can't Lose song and three covers. A video for "Raining Excuses" was released on June 28.

They did a trio of dates with Chiodos at the end of August. They followed this by playing several more dates in the U.S. and then heading overseas to tour Russia, UK, and Germany, before finishing off with played Warped Tour UK; this lasted from September until November. The band ended the year playing two festival appearances, A Very GK! Holiday Festival at House of Blues in Boston, Massachusetts on December 14, and at The Chance in Poughkeepsie, New York on December 16. (Note: The Boston show was originally going to be at The Royale.)

=== Before It Caves and Crises (2013–present) ===
The band went on Warped Tour's The Acoustic Basement Tour in February 2013. "Distance", a song that appeared on their next album, was available for streaming on August 28, as was "Conquest of Mistakes", which featured Dan "Soupy" Campbell from The Wonder Years, on September 17. Their fourth album, Before It Caves, was released on October 8 by Rise, had charted at number 43 on the Heatseekers Albums chart. The album shows the band moving to "crossover, modern rock radio territory." A video for "Distance" was released on October 27, as was one for "The Kids Cant Lose" on December 11. The band toured the U.S. in January 2014 with Our Last Night, My Ticket Home and One Year Later. A 5th anniversary reissue of The Kids Can't Lose is set for release on March 18, 2014, on vinyl. Shortly after this, the band went go on an anniversary tour with Veara, City Lights, PVRIS and Moms, in March and April.

The band supported The Wonder Years for a tour around the UK in May on The Greatest Generation World Tour. In the same month, the band played the Slam Dunk festival on May 28 in Leeds. At a hometown show in 2014, A Loss For Words announced that they were breaking up next year. On August 24, 2014, Arsenault revealed on his tumblr that the band would be releasing one more album. This album, Crises, was eventually released on December 27, 2016. The group released a collection titled Odds & Ends, in late 2017, featuring thirteen previously released songs, including demos, b-sides, bonus tracks and songs from past splits. All the songs in this album were released between 1999 and 2016, and none of them was ever part of a band's full-length record. All tracks were fully remastered and are available as a digital release only.

In 2018, A Loss For Words reunited for a one-off performance at the Palladium in Worcester, MA. The performance was in support for another Massachusetts pop punk band Four Year Strong's 11th annual holiday show. At the end of their set it was announced that there would not be a full reunion of the band and that there are no future plans.

In February 2019, A Loss For Words were confirmed to be playing at Slam Dunk Festival in the UK in May 2019.

In December 2021, A Loss for Words headlined two back-to-back nights in Brockton, Massachusetts. Night one, the band played These Past 5 Years in its entirety, with support from In Good Nature, Grimy Kidz, Risk, Hard Target, and Robinwood. Notable hardcore band Death Before Dishonor was slated to perform night one, but had to drop due to members of the band's party getting COVID-19. Night two, the band performed No Sanctuary in its entirety for the album's 10th anniversary with support from Lions Lions, Keep Flying, Shallow Pools, Cherie Amour, Dog Hotel, Mile High Sunrise.

On February 5, 2025, it was announced that they will be performing at Vans Warped Tour 2025.

== Musical style ==
A Loss for Words' music has been described by critics as pop punk.

== Band members ==
Final line-up members

- Matty Arsenault – lead vocals (1999–2015)
- Mike Adams – bass, backing vocals (2003–2015)
- Marc Dangora – guitar (2004–2015)
- Christian Mullen – drums (2012–2015)

Former members

- Kreg Dudley – lead guitar, vocals (1999–2003)
- Chris Murphy – bass (1999–2003)
- Evan Cordeiro – drums (1999–2004)
- Adam Souza – guitar (???–2004)
- Steve Delaney – drums (2004–2005)
- Danny Poulin – guitar, vocals (1999–2006)
- Jack McHugh – drums (2007–2011)
- Lee Preston – drums (2011)
- Nevada Smith – guitar, vocals (2007–2012)

Timeline

== Discography ==
Studio albums

- The Kids Can't Lose (2009) (Note: Self-released. Track listing (all songs written by A Loss for Words): "Stamp of Approval", "40 Thieves", "Where I'm From, You Die with Your Secrets", "Hold Your Breath", "Mt. St. Joseph", "The Promises You Keep (Burn This Bridge)", "Heavy Lies the Crown", "Wasted Youth", "Half-Step Down", "Behind Our Backs", and "Hot Hand in a Dice Game".)
- Motown Classics (2010/Reissued 2020 // Pure Noise Records) (Note: Paper + Plastick. Track listing: "All Night Long" (Lionel Richie), "Do You Love Me" (Berry Gordy, Jr.), "I Just Called to Say I Love You" (Stevie Wonder), "I Want You Back" (The Corporation) (feat. Dan O'Connor and Alan Day of Four Year Strong), "My Girl" (Smokey Robinson, Ronald White), "Reach Out (I'll Be There)" (Holland–Dozier–Holland), "Tears of a Clown" (Wonder, Hank Cosby, Robinson), "This Old Heart of Mine" (Holland–Dozier–Holland), "What's Goin On" (Al Cleveland, Renaldo Benson, Marvin Gaye), and "You Can't Hurry Love" (Holland–Dozier–Holland).)
- No Sanctuary (2011 // Rise Records) (Note: Rise/Velocity. Track listing (all songs written by A Loss for Words): "Honeymoon Eyes", "Pray for Rain", "Pirouette", "Raining Excuses", "The Hammers Fall", "The Lost Cause I Used to Be", "No Sanctuary", "JMR", "Jetsetter", "Finite", and "Wrightsville Beach". Vinyl edition contains the bonus track "You"; an acoustic version of "Pirouette" and a new song, "The Recluse", were available as digital download bonus tracks.)
- Before It Caves (2013 // Rise Records) (Note: Rise. Track listing (all songs written by A Loss for Words): "Distance" (feat. Lyndsey Gunnulfsen of PVRIS), "Conquest of Mistakes" (feat. Soupy Campbell), "Falling", "All This Time", "No Pioneer" (feat. Jimmy Stadt of Polar Bear Club), "20 Block", "No Merit to Envy", "Eclipsed", "The Kids Can't Lose", "The Torch & the Name", "Brace Yourself", "Siesta Key", and "All Roads Lead Home" (new recording).)
- Crises (2016 // Rise Records)

EPs

- Coming Soon to a Theater Near You (2004)
- These Past 5 Years (2005 // Rock Vegas Records)
- Webster Lake (2008)
- Returning to Webster Lake (2012 // Rise Records)

Splits

- RVR Series Volume II (Split EP with They Sleep They Dream) [2007]
- Such Gold/A Loss for Words (Split EP with Such Gold) [2011]

Compilation albums

- Odds & Ends (2017)
- Odds & Ends Vol. II (2018)

Other

- 2007: "Water Runs Dry" (Boyz II Men cover released online)
- 2008: "Face or Kneecaps" (The Movielife cover featured on compilation by Little Heart Records)

== Videography ==
- "Death or Glory" (2005)
- "Half Step Down" (2006)
- "Stamp of Approval" (2009)
- "Hold Your Breath" (2009)
- "Pirouette" (2012)
- "Raining Excuses" (2012)
- "Distance" (ft. Lynn Gunn) (2013)
- "The Kids Can't Lose" (2013)
- "All This Time" (2014)
