= The New Sidewalk =

Studio album by Such Gold
- Released: November 11, 2014
- Genre: Punk rock
- Length: 37:55
- Label: Razor & Tie

Such Gold chronology
Misadventures (2012)	The New Sidewalk (2014)

Professional ratings
Aggregate scores
Source	Rating
Metacritic	73/100
Review scores
Source	Rating
AllMusic	3.5/5 stars

The New Sidewalk is the second studio album by American punk rock band Such Gold. It was released in November 2014 under Razor & Tie.

== Track listing ==
No.	Title	Length
1.	"Engulfed in Flames"	3:05
2.	"Faced"	2:20
3.	"Axed Away"	3:04
4.	"Food Court Blues"	3:05
5.	"No Cab Fare"	4:40
6.	"I Know What I Saw"	3:18
7.	"Nauseating"	3:31
8.	"Don't Park Next to Me"	1:53
9.	"Morrison"	3:11
10.	"When It Gives"	1:56
11.	"Frying in the Mix"	2:57
12.	"The New Sidewalk"	4:55
