= No Trigger =

American melodic hardcore band

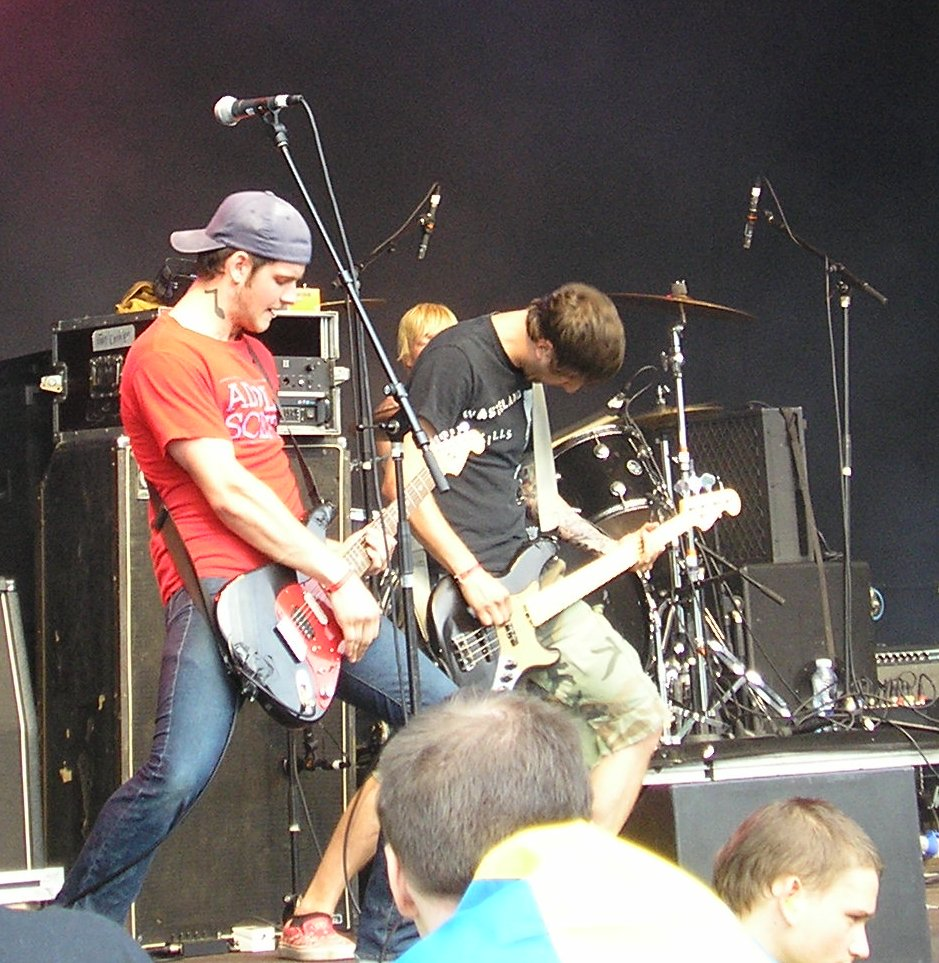
- No Trigger - playing at Augustibuller 2007

Background information
- Origin: Massachusetts, U.S.
- Genres: Punk rock; pop punk; melodic hardcore; hardcore punk
- Years active: 2001–present
- Labels: Red Scare, No Sleep, Nitro, Mightier Than Sword, I Scream Records, Bird Attack, New School
- Website: facebook.com/notrigger

No Trigger is an American melodic hardcore band from Massachusetts.

== History ==
The band formed in 2001, with a sound which takes cues from like-minded outfits such as Strike Anywhere and None More Black. The band self-released two demos, one of them a split with Wasteland. By this point the band had started to gain accolades from the webzine likes of Pastepunk and Punknews, the latter of which referred to No Trigger as close to being "the best unsigned band in America".

In late 2004, the band compiled these recordings and remastered the sound for their seven track debut release, Extinction in Stereo, released on independent record label Bigmouth Japan. The players were Tom Ciesluk on bass, Mike Ciprari on drums, Mike Przygoda and Jon Strader on guitar, Tom Rheault on vocals. The engineers were Will Killingsworth and Nick Rotundo.

In 2005, No Trigger signed to independent record label Nitro Records, and their debut full-length, entitled Canyoneer, was released on March 21, 2006.

A long period of inactivity following Canyoneer lead to speculation that No Trigger had broken up. The band released an update in September 2010 which announced that the original lineup had reformed and was going to release Be Honest, a 7-inch EP on December 14, 2010. The band announced that they had signed to No Sleep Records shortly after the release of the EP, and anticipate a full-length release in mid-2011.

Their second album, Tycoon, was recorded with producer Jay Maas beginning in July, 2011, and was released on 21 February 2012. At that time the release of the band members included vocalist Tom Rheault and drummer Mike Ciprari.

Following another period of inactivity, No Trigger released the 4-track EP "Adult Braces on Bird Attack Records in 2017, and, on 26 August 2022 their third album, "Dr. Album". This album marks a turn, with more humour and quips interspersed throughout the 13 tracks. Musically, the album showcases more diversity, finding the band give themselves more creative freedom to explore genres adjacent to their fast melodic punk roots, including pop-punk, ska, folk music, adding synthesisers, samples and electronic beats and vocal effescts. Lyrically, the album also shows an evolution: while Tom Rheault's lyrics have always shown commitment to and care for social justice and progressive causes and issues, Dr. Album is openly anti-fascist, anarchist, pro-drugs and anti-religion, while also treating all these subjects with a snarky light-heartedness not found in previous releases.

== Discography ==
=== Studio albums ===
- Canyoneer (Nitro Records/I Scream Records, March 2006)
- Tycoon (No Sleep Records, 21 February 2012)
- Dr. Album (Red Scare, 26 August 2022)

=== Singles and EPs ===
- The World Is Not a Stage (CD-R) (self-released, 2003)
- No Trigger / Wasteland (CD-R) (self-released, 2004)
- Extinction in Stereo [compilation] (Bigmouth JPN, 2005, New School Records, 2007)
- Be Honest (Mightier Than Sword Records, 2010)
- Adult Braces (Bird Attack Records, 2017)
- Acid Lord (Red Scare, 2022)

=== Music videos ===
- "Earthtones" (2005)
- "Fish Eye Lens" (2006)
- "More to Offer" (2007)
- "Dried Piss" (2012)
- "Dogs On Acid" (2017)
- "Antifantasy" (2022)
- "Brainwashed" (2022)
- "Acid Lord" (2022)
- "No Tattoos" (2022)

== Members ==
=== Current ===
- Tom Rheault – lead vocals
- Brad Rheault – bass guitar
- Jon Strader – rhythm guitar
- Mike Przygoda – lead guitar
- Jono Diener – drums
- Tom Ciesluk – guitar / keys

=== Former ===
- Billy Bean – guitar
- Erik Perkins – drums
- Solomos – Roadie Extraordinaire
- Mike Ciprari – drums
