= Canyoneer (album) =

Studio album by No Trigger
- Released: March 21, 2006
- Genre: Melodic hardcore; hardcore punk
- Length: 31:47
- Label: Nitro
- Producer: Bill Stevenson; Jason Livermore

No Trigger chronology
| Extinction in Stereo (2005) | Canyoneer (2006) | Be Honest (2010) |

Professional ratings
Review scores
| Source | Rating |
|---|---|
| AbsolutePunk | 88% |
| Punknews.org | 4/5 stars |

Canyoneer is the first full-length studio album by the melodic hardcore band No Trigger. It was released on Nitro Records.

== Track listing ==
All tracks are written by No Trigger.

Canyoneer
| No. | Title | Length |
|---|---|---|
| 1. | "The (Not So) Noble Purveyors of the Third or Fourth Coming" | 1:59 |
| 2. | "Neon National Park" | 2:50 |
| 3. | "My Woods" | 2:06 |
| 4. | "Fish Eye Lens" | 2:37 |
| 5. | "Owner Operator" | 2:10 |
| 6. | "The Honshu Underground" | 3:53 |
| 7. | "Bust Tropical" | 2:29 |
| 8. | "You Said It" | 0:45 |
| 9. | "Hail Mary Leakey" | 3:13 |
| 10. | "Attack of Orion and the Left Arm Sunburn" | 3:36 |
| 11. | "More to Offer" | 3:20 |
| 12. | "Tundra Kids" | 2:42 |
| Total length: | | 31:47 |
