= What You Don't See =

Studio album by The Story So Far
- Released: March 26, 2013
- Recorded: October–November 2012
- Studios: The Panda Studios, Fremont California
- Genres: Pop punk, punk rock, emo
- Length: 29:57
- Label: Pure Noise
- Producer: Sam Pura

The Story So Far chronology
Under Soil and Dirt (2011)	What You Don't See (2013)	The Story So Far (2015)

Singles from What You Don't See
- 1. "Right Here" Released: February 5, 2013

What You Don't See is the second studio album by American pop punk band The Story So Far.

== Background ==
The Story So Far signed to Pure Noise in March 2010. The band released their debut album in June 2011. The band supported We Are the Union and I Call Fives in July. The band toured alongside Heartsounds and Handguns in August. The band supported Senses Fail in November. From late February to early March 2012 the band went on the Pure Noise Records Tour alongside Handguns, I Call Fives, Daybreaker, The American Scene and Forever Came Calling. In early November, the band supported New Found Glory on the Road to Warped Tour in the UK. From late November to mid-December, the band supported New Found Glory on the 10th anniversary tour for their Sticks and Stones album. The band listened to New Found Glory when they were younger and did not expect to tour with them in their lifetime.

== Composition and recording ==
On December 31, 2011, it was announced that The Story So Far was recording new material. In March 2012 it was announced the band would be writing new songs in the summer. In August it was posted that the band were recording "something" at Panda Studios. The band recorded at Panda Studios in San Francisco, in the fall. In an October 2012 interview with Alternative Press bassist Kelen Capener revealed the band were "just starting [to record] drum [tracks]". The band went to the studio with 13 songs but were writing new material during the record process in case they want to drop any of the previously written material. The band were figuring out what made their previous record excellent and attempted to expand on it. The album was produced by Steve Klein of New Found Glory and Sam Pura. Klein originally visited the band to see what material they had and gave them tips.

Guitarist William Levy said the new album was "heavier and more melodic" compared to Under Soil and Dirt. Levy reassured that the album is "still us, it's just more focused." The song structures were "thought out a little better" and "parts that we came up with are more interesting." Capener mentioned the group were not "trying to write something stylistically different" to their previous material. The new material "shows maturation" but retains the "same youthful energy and angst we've always loved." On November 22, the band announced they had finished recording.

== Release ==
On January 16, 2013 What You Don't See was announced and the track listing and cover art was revealed. The band toured Australia in January with support from Anchors. "Right Here" was released as a single on February 5. On February 26, "The Glass" was made available for streaming. The band co-headlined The Suppy Nation Tour with Man Overboard through March and April. On March 11, "Empty Space" was made available for streaming exclusively via Rock Sound. When the band had finished recorded, they showed the album to their relatives and friends. "Empty Space" attracted their attention "and made a few heads bob", according to Capener. As a result, the band made a music video for it based on their friends and families' reaction. The video was released two days later, it was directed by Kyle Camarillo.

In early March 2013 the album leaked and as a result the band were selling vinyl copies of it on tour. On March 25, the album was made available for streaming, and a day later it was released through Pure Noise. (Note: U.S. Pure Noise PNE 127CD) The band toured the UK and Europe from late April to mid May with support from The American Scene and Gnarwolves. The band played on the 2013 edition of Warped Tour. The band toured the UK in October with Seahaven and Save Your Breath supporting. The band toured in November and December with support from Stick to Your Guns, Such Gold and Rotting Out. The band supported A Day to Remember in January and February 2014 on their tour of Europe. On March 16, the band performed at South by So What?! festival. The band played on the 2014 edition of Warped Tour. The band supported The Wonder Years in October. The band supported New Found Glory in November on their Pop Punk's Not Dead tour of the UK.

== Reception ==
Professional ratings
Aggregate scores
Source	Rating
Metacritic	84/100
Review scores
Source	Rating
AbsolutePunk	85%
AllMusic	Favorable
Alternative Press	4.0/5 stars
Punknews.org	4.0/5 stars
Rock Sound	8/10

Reviews have been generally highly positive, with a Metacritic score of 84, indicating universal acclaim. Alternative Press described the album as "thoughtful and passionate", one that "will help young listeners navigate the murky waters of growing up." AllMusic reviewer Fred Thomas wrote that the album's 11 songs were "new blasts of melodic pop-punk." Thomas compared it to "many great punk records", in that it "breezes by in just under 30 minutes".

The album was placed at number 9 on Rock Sound's "The 50 Best Albums Of 2013" list.

The album debuted at number 46 on the Billboard 200. It sold over 13,500 copies in the first week. As of April 2015, the album has sold 63,000 copies domestically.

== Track listing ==
All tracks are written by The Story So Far.

What You Don't See track listing
No.	Title	Length
1.	"Things I Can't Change"	2:52
2.	"Stifled"	2:12
3.	"Small Talk"	2:43
4.	"Playing the Victim"	2:50
5.	"Right Here"	2:35
6.	"Empty Space"	2:29
7.	"The Glass"	2:47
8.	"All Wrong"	3:02
9.	"Bad Luck"	2:22
10.	"Face Value"	2:52
11.	"Framework"	3:08
Total length:		29:57

== Personnel ==
Personnel per booklet.

The Story So Far

- Parker Cannon – vocals
- Kevin Geyer – lead guitar, vocals
- William Levy – rhythm guitar
- Kelen Capener – bass
- Ryan Torf – drums, percussion

Production

- Sam Pura – engineer, producer, mixing
- Steve Klein – producer
- Donald Scully, Jonathan Rego – assistant engineer, mixing assistant
- Brian "Big Bass" Gardner – mastering engineer
- Jordan Pundik – album illustrations
- Cyrus Balooki – layout

== Charts ==
Chart (2013)	Peak position
UK Independent Albums Chart Top 50	33
UK Independent Album Breakers Chart Top 20	6
UK Record Store Chart Top 40	11
UK Rock & Metal Albums Chart Top 40	8
U.S. Billboard 200	46
U.S. Billboard Alternative Albums	8
U.S. Billboard Independent Albums	8
U.S. Billboard Rock Albums	11
U.S. Billboard Vinyl Albums	1
