= Proper Dose =

Studio album by The Story So Far
- Released: September 21, 2018
- Recorded: 2017–2018
- Studio: The Panda Studios, Fremont, California; The Farm, Gibsons, British Columbia
- Genre: Pop punk; alternative rock
- Length: 33:03
- Label: Pure Noise
- Producer: Sam Pura

The Story So Far chronology
The Story So Far (2015)	Proper Dose (2018)	I Want to Disappear (2024)

Singles from The Story So Far
- 1. "Out of It" Released: September 12, 2017

Proper Dose is the fourth studio album by American pop punk band The Story So Far. It was released on September 21, 2018, via Pure Noise Records. It is the band's last album with bassist Kelen Capener, who announced his departure in 2022.

== Background ==
Proper Dose was recorded at The Panda Studios in Fremont, California, and The Farm Studios in Gibsons, British Columbia. Sam Pura served as producer and engineer with assistance from Tyler Shane Rodriquez, Karl Dicaire, and Ryan Ellery. The band's drummer Ryan Torf did additional engineering on the tracks. Eric Valentine mixed the recordings with assistance from Michael Carrey at Studio Topangadise in Topanga, California, before the album was mastered by Brian Gardner in Lake Arrowhead, California.

== Release ==
Prior to the album's release, two singles were released on August 20, 2018: "Upside Down" and "Take Me as You Please". A music video for "Upside Down" was released on September 21. Proper Dose sold 18,248 pure copies in its first week of release and debuted at number 19 on the Billboard 200 chart. In April 2019, the band went on an Australian tour with Basement.

== Track listing ==
All songs written by the Story So Far.

No.	Title	Length
1.	"Proper Dose"	2:20
2.	"Keep This Up"	2:27
3.	"Out of It"	2:38
4.	"Take Me as You Please"	3:43
5.	"Let It Go"	2:48
6.	"Upside Down"	3:51
7.	"If I Fall"	3:27
8.	"Need to Know"	2:52
9.	"Line"	2:37
10.	"Growing on You"	3:17
11.	"Light Year"	3:33
Total length:		33:03

== Personnel ==
Personnel per booklet.

The Story So Far

- Parker Cannon – vocals
- Kevin Geyer – lead guitar, vocals
- Kelen Capener – bass
- Will Levy – rhythm guitar
- Ryan Torf – drums

Production and design

- Sam Pura – producer, engineer
- Tyler Shane Rodriquez – assistant
- Karl Dicaire – assistant
- Ryan Ellery – assistant
- Ryan Torf – additional engineering
- Eric Valentine – mixing
- Michael Carrey – assistant
- Brian Gardner – mastering
- Rob Carmichael – art direction
- The Story So Far – photography

== Charts ==
Chart (2018)	Peak position
Australian albums (ARIA)	55
Scottish Albums (OCC)	50
UK Albums (OCC)	66
US Billboard 200	19
