= Be Honest (EP) =

EP by No Trigger
- Released: December 14, 2010
- Genre: Melodic hardcore; pop punk
- Label: Mightier Than Sword

No Trigger chronology
Canyoneer (2006)	Be Honest (2010)	Tycoon (2012)

Professional ratings
Review scores
Source	Rating
Alternative Press	4/5 stars

Be Honest is an EP from melodic hardcore band No Trigger. This marks the band's first recording in four years following the release of their last full length, Canyoneer. This EP is also a reunion of the original band line-up.

== Track listing ==
1. "Commonwealth"
2. "Tooth"

== Personnel ==
- Tom Rheault – vocals
- Tom Ciesluk – bass
- Mike Ciprari – drums
- Mike Przygoda – guitar
- Jon Strader – guitar
