= Under Soil and Dirt =

Studio album by The Story So Far
- Released: June 21, 2011
- Recorded: Spring 2011
- Studio: The Panda Studios
- Genre: Pop punk
- Length: 32:12
- Label: Pure Noise
- Producer: Sam Pura

The Story So Far chronology
The Story So Far / Morgan Foster Split (2011)	Under Soil and Dirt (2011)	What You Don't See (2013)

Under Soil and Dirt is the debut studio album by American pop punk band the Story So Far.

== Background ==
The Story So Far formed in Walnut Creek, California in 2007. The band consisted of Parker Cannon on vocals, Kevin Geyer and Kevin Ambrose on guitar, Ryan Torf on drums, and Kelen Capener on bass. Ambrose parted ways with the band when he went to college and was replaced by William Levy. On April 1, 2010, it was announced that the band had signed to Pure Noise Records. The band supported This Time Next Year in November. The band went on tour with The American Scene in January 2011.

== Composition and recording ==
Throughout the writing and recording process, the band listened to Transit's Keep This to Yourself (2010). All of the band members "loved [Keep This to Yourself] and thought it was next level", according to Capener. The band thought that the "14 awesome, solid" songs were "fucking badass" that they "want[ed] to do", according to Levy. Levy and Geyer would listen to Elliott Smith, The Weakerthans, Wilco, Mother of Mercy, and Black Breath while driving. Levy described Under Soil and Dirt as "Pop-Punk, with lyrics about Girls and growing up; grooviness, lot of energy." Capener said the album isn't "really in your face, but at the same time, it is. It's an honest record, it packs a punch". Levy found it difficult to write material since Capener lived an hour away and Cannon living six hours away. At the time, Capener had a job and was in college.

The members shared what they had written with each other online. One weekend the band did pre-production where they "basically had the framework of each song ready to go" when they were set to go into the studio. The album was recorded at The Panda Studios, in spring 2011, with Sam Pura producing. The band considers Pura a sixth member of the band. If Pura disliked a section of a song the band would listen to Pura. "Mt. Diablo" was re-recorded, the original version can be found a split with Maker. Cannon revealed that the album was recorded while the members were high. Cannon reasoned that this method "makes us look at ourselves from an outside perspective and not be assholes." Cannon did not "record one vocal sober".

== Release ==
In April 2011, The Story So Far revealed the album's title, Under Soil and Dirt. A month later, the track listing and cover art was revealed. The artwork was illustrated by Cody Sullivan, who also provided the layout. On May 24, "Quicksand" was made available for streaming. On June 6, "High Regard" was made available for streaming. On June 14, "Placeholder" was made available for streaming. On June 17, the album was made available for streaming. Under Soil and Dirt was released on June 21 through Pure Noise. (Note: U.S. Pure Noise PNE112) The band supported We Are the Union and I Call Fives in July. On July 14, the band released a music video for "Quicksand". The video was directed by James Liberato. The band played a record release show on July 18 at The Red House in Walnut Creek. The band toured alongside Heartsounds and Handguns in August. The band supported Senses Fail in November.

The Story So Far went on a short tour in early December with support from This Time Next Year and Daybreaker. The band supported Set Your Goals on a short holiday tour in mid-December. In January and February 2012, the band toured the UK alongside Man Overboard and Save Your Breath. From late February to early March, the band went on the Pure Noise Records Tour alongside Handguns, I Call Fives, Daybreaker, The American Scene and Forever Came Calling. On March 18, a music video was released for "Roam". The video was filmed around the South Bank in London. In March and April, the band supported The Wonder Years on the Glamour Kills Spring 2012 tour. To promote the tour, a compilation album was released that featured the bands covering one of the other bands' songs. The Story So Far's contribution was a cover of the A Loss for Words track "Wrightsville Beach". The band played some headlining shows in July with Seahaven, Stickup Kid, Troubled Coast and Stateside as support acts. On October 8, the album was released in the UK. In early November, the band supported New Found Glory on the Road to Warped Tour in the UK. From late November to mid-December, the band supported New Found Glory on the 10th anniversary tour for their Sticks and Stones album.

== Reception ==
Professional ratings
Review scores
Source	Rating
AbsolutePunk	8.1/10
Alternative Press	3.5/5 stars
Alter the Press!	5/5

Capener said the album was "received really well". The album was included at number 26 on Rock Sound's "The 51 Most Essential Pop Punk Albums of All Time" list.

== Track listing ==
All tracks are written by The Story So Far.

Under Soil and Dirt track listing
No.	Title	Length
1.	"States and Minds"	0:51
2.	"Roam"	2:54
3.	"Quicksand"	2:38
4.	"Swords and Pens"	3:09
5.	"High Regard"	3:51
6.	"Daughters"	3:06
7.	"Mt. Diablo"	4:09
8.	"Four Years"	2:44
9.	"Rally Cap"	2:18
10.	"Placeholder"	3:05
11.	"Closure"	3:19
Total length:		32:12

Japanese bonus tracks (Ice Grill$ Records)
No.	Title	Length
12.	"680 South"
13.	"May"
14.	"Unlisted track" (Jawbreaker cover)

== Personnel ==
Personnel per back panel.

The Story So Far

- Parker Cannon – vocals
- William Levy – rhythm guitar
- Kevin Geyer – lead guitar, vocals
- Kelen Capener – bass
- Ryan Torf – drums

Production

- Sam Pura – engineer, producer, mixing, mastering
- Cody Sullivan – illustrations, layout

== Charts ==
Chart (2021)	Peak position
UK Rock & Metal Albums (Official Charts)	35
