= Shallow Pools =

American indie pop band

shallow pools
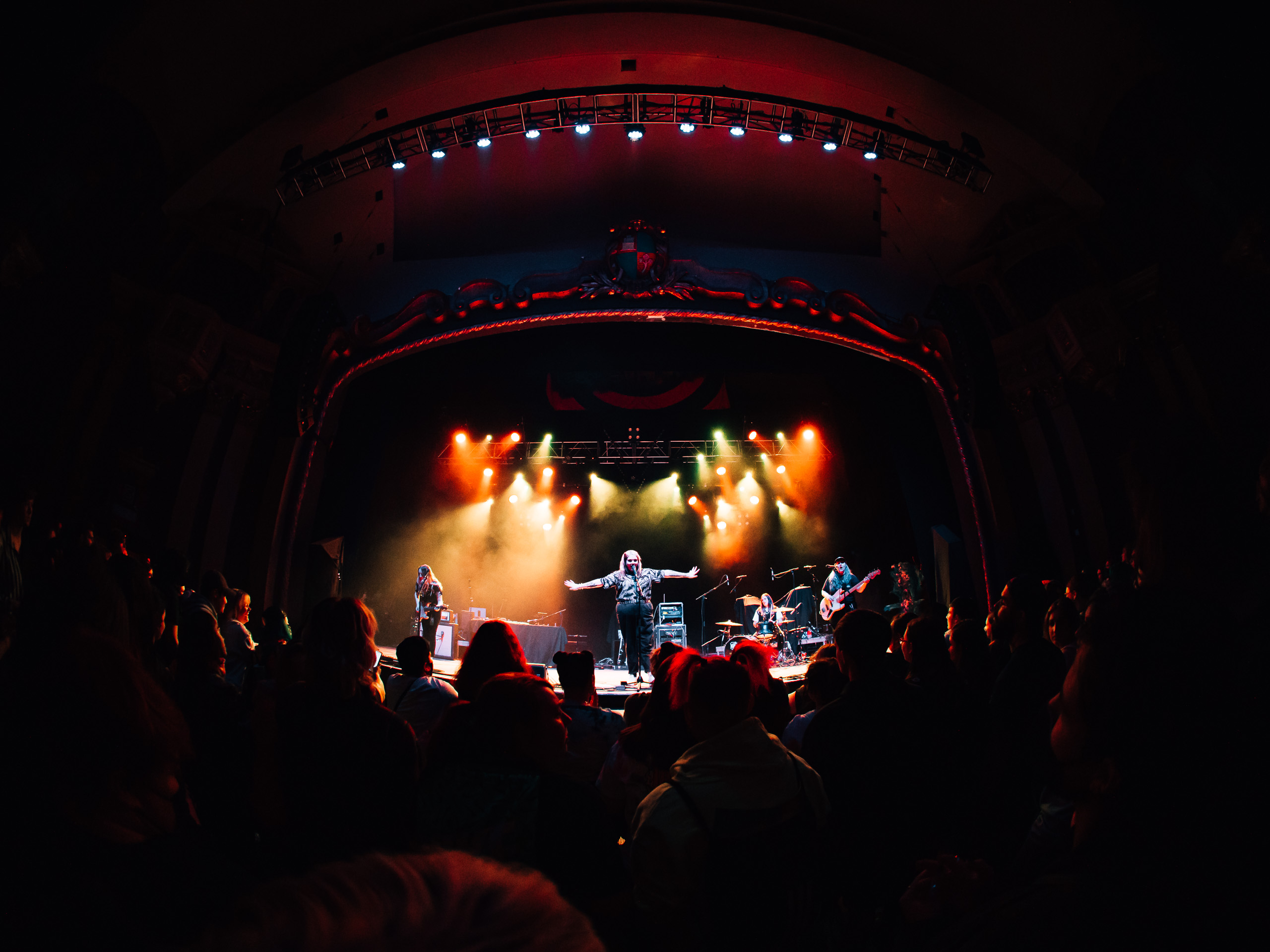
- Shallow pools performing at State Theater in Portland, Maine, 2022, by Mac Praed

Background information
- Origin: Boston, Massachusetts, U.S.
- Genres: Indie pop; synth-pop; shimmer pop
- Years active: 2018–present
- Labels: ESI, Equal Vision
- Members: Ali Ajemian; Glynnis Brennan; Jess Gromada; Haley Senft
- Website: shallowpools.com

Shallow Pools (stylized as shallow pools) is an American indie pop band based in Boston, Massachusetts. The band has four members, drummer Ali Ajemian, lead vocalist Glynnis Brennan, guitarist Jess Gromada and bassist Haley Senft.

== Career ==
=== Origin ===
Friends since middle school, Jess Gromada and Glynnis Brennan befriended Ali Ajemian once they entered high school. They all loved playing music together and started by playing acoustic cover songs in 2012, originally under the name Patella Talk; before deciding in 2016 to begin writing their own music under the name Self Titled, before ultimately choosing to begin releasing under the name shallow pools in 2018.

Shortly after deciding on the name, they met songwriter and producer Chris Curran, who helped to shape the sound and direction of the new project. In July 2019, Haley Senft joined the band as a live bassist exclusively before becoming an official member later that year.

=== Spring - EP & Singles (2018–2020) ===
The band expressed their desire to "promote inclusivity" and to "create a safe space for listeners to express themselves through their music." With their message, they released their debut single as shallow pools, "It's A You Thing.", in July 2018, followed by "Sinking" in August of that same year.

On March 8, 2019, the band's debut EP Spring, was released. The EP was met with praise, with Alt Corner commenting on Glynnis' "emotive vocals" and the songs "deliciously melodic choruses".

The quartet went on to release four singles throughout 2020: "Haunted", "Bloom", "Afterlight" and "Turnaround".

=== headspace EP (2021) ===
The band began 2021 by releasing new music through ESI Records, marking a new era for the band, and put out a single on January 15, 2021, titled "ice water" with a music video released the same day. This release is a notable contrast from their earlier work; the band noting that the coming releases are "a departure from the music we’ve made in the past, but it’s the perfect bridge between our old and new sound."

On February 19, 2021, the second single was released, titled "glow", with another official music video.

On March 26, 2021, the third single was released, titled "nothing new", with another official music video.

On April 30, 2021, the fourth single was released, titled "it's alright", with another official music video.

On June 4, 2021, headspace EP was released along with the fifth and final single, titled "gardens", with another official music video.

=== Signing to Equal Vision (2022) ===
In November 2022 the band signed to Equal Vision Records and released a new single, "Say What You Want".

Shallow Pools played the 2025 Rat City Arts Festival alongside groups like Tiberius, Beeef, and Daphne Blue Underworld.

== Personal lives ==
All four members are active politically and socially engaged. They are all advocates for LGBTQ equality, as well as members of the community themselves.

In 2020, the band created a t-shirt inspired by their single "Turnaround", and donated all proceeds to the Marsha P. Johnson Institute, which defends and protects the rights of black transgender people.

== Band members ==
=== Current members ===
- Ali Ajemian – drums
- Glynnis Brennan – lead vocals
- Jess Gromada – guitar
- Haley Senft – bass

== Musical style ==
Shallow Pools' musical style has been described as indie pop and glimmer pop, and has cited as musical and career influences Lights, Fickle Friends and Dua Lipa.

== Discography ==
=== Extended plays ===
- Spring, (2019)

- headspace, (2021)

- daydreaming, (2022)

=== Singles ===
Title	Year	Album
"It's A You Thing."	2018	Spring
"Sinking"	2018	Spring
"Haunted"	2020	
"Bloom"	2020	
"Afterlight"	2020	
"Turnaround"	2020	
"ice water"	2021	headspace
"glow"	2021	headspace
"nothing new"	2021	headspace
"it's alright"	2021	headspace
"gardens"	2021	headspace
"everything is fine"	2022	
"circles (feat. Trey Miller of Cherie Amour)"	2022	
"bitter"	2022	daydreaming
"wildflower"		daydreaming
"everything is fine"		daydreaming
"circles (feat. Trey Miller of Cherie Amour)"		daydreaming
"heavy on my heart"		daydreaming

=== Music videos ===
Title	Year	Director	Ref.
"It's A You Thing."	2018	Ali Ajemian and Andrew Young	
"haunted"	2020	Burke Cullinane	
"turnaround"	2020	Burke Cullinane	
"ice water"	2021	Mercedes Arn-Horn	
"glow"	2021	Mercedes Arn-Horn	
"nothing new"	2021	Dana Verdecchio	
"it's alright"	2021	Dana Verdecchio	
"gardens"	2021	Dana Verdecchio	
"Everything is Fine"	2022	Dana Verdecchio and Ali Ajemian	

== Awards and nominations ==
Boston Music Awards

Year	Recipient/work	Award	Result	Ref.
2019	shallow pools	New Artist of the Year	Nominated	
2021	shallow pools	Pop Artist of the Year	Nominated	
2021	shallow pools	Album/EP of the Year (headspace)	Nominated	
2021	shallow pools	Song of the Year (ice water)	Nominated	
