= The Story So Far (The Story So Far album) =

2015 studio album by The Story So Far

Studio album by The Story So Far
- Released: May 19, 2015
- Recorded: The Panda Studios, Fremont, California
- Genre: Pop punk
- Length: 30:33
- Label: Pure Noise
- Producer: Sam Pura

The Story So Far chronology
What You Don't See (2013)	The Story So Far (2015)	Proper Dose (2018)

Singles from The Story So Far
- 1. "Heavy Gloom" Released: May 18, 2015

The Story So Far is the third studio album by American pop punk band The Story So Far. The album was released through Pure Noise in May 2015. The album charted at number 23 in the U.S. and at number 70 in the UK.

== Background ==
While on the 2014 edition of Warped Tour, The Story So Far was interviewed by AbsolutePunk. Bassist Kelen Capener was queried when the band was going to begin working on a new album. Capener explained that after touring obligations for the year, and partway into the next year, they are going to take some time off to write new material. Capener revealed that the band have "started working on [a new record]" by demoing new songs. He hoped that the band could start recording by the beginning of next year. He also hoped that the album would come out within the same year.

== Composition and recording ==
Material for The Story So Far was written on and off while touring over the course of 2014. This was first time the band wrote material together. Vocalist Parker Cannon went to practice one day and asked the rest of the band if they wanted to do a self-titled release. Guitarist William Levy said he did not know if the album being self-titled "mean[t] anything, really. It's just the record that we felt like doing". Levy revealed the band liked the album "more than any other record" they've done previously. The band demoed a portion of material in Chico, California with Chris Conley of Saves the Day at Conley's practice space. The band met Conley when they were previously playing on Warped Tour. Capener said Conley was "inspiring and a creative catalyst" that provided creative decisions. Capener called Conley's oversight was "a huge confidence boost". The band left Conley's practice space with several songs that were going to be recorded as they were.

The album was recorded with producer Sam Pura at Panda Studios. The band previously worked with Pura on their past releases. Levy said recording "didn't actually feel any different" compared to the first time they recorded with Pura. Unlike previous releases, drummer Ryan Torf performed, in addition to his main instrument, percussion and organ.

== Release ==
On December 30, 2014, Pure Noise posted a summary of their 2014 releases and listed a number of bands that would release an album in 2015 – one band being The Story So Far. On March 15, 2015 it was announced The Story So Far would release a self-titled album. On the same day, "Nerve" was made available for streaming. On April 6, "Solo" was made available for streaming. On April 27, "Heavy Gloom" was made available for streaming. On May 11, the album was made available for streaming. "Heavy Gloom" was released to radio as the lead single on May 18. A day later, The Story So Far was released through Pure Noise. (Note: U.S. Pure Noise PNE 1682) James Fisher of Basement, who made the artwork and designed the layout, said the artwork was "an observational drawing", created after "just one days work at the recording studio." The artwork consists of "Guitar summoning, giant snake riding, erupting sky volcanos and waterfall drumming".

From early May to mid June 2015 the band toured across the US with Four Year Strong, Terror and Souvenirs as support acts. The band toured Japan in August and in Australia & New Zealand in September, with support from Man Overboard. In October and November, the band went on a US tour with support from Basement and Turnover. The band toured the UK in December with support from Turnstile and Drug Church. On March 1, 2016, a music video was released for "Heavy Gloom", directed by Kyle Camarillo and Joey Izzo. In April, the band went a tour of the US and Canada with support from Comeback Kid and Culture Abuse.

The band went on the 2016 edition of Warped Tour. In October and November, the group supported Good Charlotte on their headlining US tour.

== Reception ==
Professional ratings
Aggregate scores
Source	Rating
Metacritic	80/100
Review scores
Source	Rating
AbsolutePunk	5/10
Alternative Press	4/5 stars
DIY	4/5 stars
Exclaim!	8/10
Idobi Radio	9/10
Kerrang!	4/5 Ks
Punknews.org	3.5/5 stars
TeamRock	Favorable
Ultimate Guitar	6.7/10
Upset	4/5 stars

The album charted at number 23 on the U.S. Billboard 200 with first week sales of 23,000 copies. The album reached number 40 on Billboard's Hard Rock Albums year-end chart.

== Track listing ==
All tracks are written by The Story So Far.

The Story So Far track listing
No.	Title	Length
1.	"Smile"	3:07
2.	"Heavy Gloom"	2:50
3.	"Distaste"	3:15
4.	"Solo"	2:38
5.	"Mock"	3:30
6.	"How You Are"	3:46
7.	"Nerve"	3:08
8.	"Phantom"	2:32
9.	"Scowl"	2:32
10.	"Stalemate"	3:15
Total length:		30:33

== Personnel ==
Personnel per booklet.

The Story So Far

- Parker Cannon – vocals
- Kevin Geyer – lead guitar, vocals
- Will Levy – rhythm guitar
- Kelen Capener – bass
- Ryan Torf – drums, percussion, organ

Production

- Sam Pura – producer, engineer, mixing
- Ryan "Rings" Ellery – engineer, assistant mix engineer
- James Trevascus – assistant engineer, assistant mix engineer
- Kris Crummett – mastering
- James Fisher – artwork, layout

== Charts ==
=== Weekly charts ===
Chart (2015)	Peak position
Australian Albums (ARIA)	35
Scottish Albums Chart	43
UK Albums Chart (OCC)	70
UK Album Downloads Chart	58
UK Album Sales Chart	55
UK Independent Albums Chart Top 50	7
UK Independent Album Breakers Chart Top 20	1
UK Rock & Metal Albums Chart	5
UK Vinyl Album Chart	15
U.S. Billboard 200	23
U.S. Billboard Alternative Albums	5
U.S. Billboard Independent Albums	2
U.S. Billboard Top Rock Albums	5
U.S. Billboard Top Album Sales	14
U.S. Billboard Vinyl Albums	1

=== Year-end charts ===
Chart (2015)	Position
U.S. Billboard Hard Rock Albums	40
