= Misadventures (Such Gold album) =

Studio album by Such Gold
- Released: August 20, 2012
- Genres: Punk rock, melodic hardcore, emo, pop punk
- Length: 28:15
- Label: Razor & Tie
- Producer: Steve Evetts

Such Gold chronology
Pedestals (2010)	Misadventures (2012)	The New Sidewalk (2014)

Professional ratings
Review scores
Source	Rating
Absolute Punk	76%
AllMusic	3.5/5 stars
Alter the Press	3/5 stars
Bring The Noise	8/10 stars
Punknews.org	4/5 stars

Misadventures is the full-length debut album by pop punk/hardcore band Such Gold. The album was released on August 14, 2012 through Razor and Tie Records. The album was praised by critics and fans a like and is a major stepping stone for the upcoming band, and it was a more mature album compared to the band's previous releases; Pedestals, Stand Tall, and the split with Into It Over It. The album was released on 12" records, compact discs, as well as digital download, and the first single "Storyteller" was also released on a 7" inch record, with the B-side being "Locked Out of the Magic Theater." To promote the album the band went on a headlining tour with Mixtapes and Citizen.

== Track listing ==
All music is composed by Such Gold.

No.	Title	Length
1.	"Two Year Plan"	2:18
2.	"Committee Circus"	3:15
3.	"Storyteller"	1:35
4.	"Keyhole M.O."	2:34
5.	"Another Day"	2:59
6.	"Survival Of The Fondest"	2:17
7.	"Tell Yourself"	2:29
8.	"Higher Places"	2:25
9.	"Understand And Forget"	2:35
10.	"Locked Out Of The Magic Theater"	2:44
11.	"You Are Your Greatest Threat (The Doctor Will Serve You Now)"	3:10
Total length:		28:15

== Personnel ==
Such Gold

- Devan Bentley - drums
- Skylar Sarkis - guitar/vocals
- Ben Kotin - vocals
- Nate Derby - guitar
- Devon Hubbard - bass/vocals
