= Mightier Than Sword Records =

American record label

- Founded: 2006
- Defunct: 2012
- Genre: Punk
- Country of origin: U.S.
- Location: Brooklyn, New York

Mightier Than Sword Records was an independent record label based in Brooklyn, New York, owned and operated by RJ Crowder-Schaefer. Its releases are not confined to any particular genre, though most fall within the punk/hardcore genre and also socially/politically conscious bands. A majority of releases are on vinyl. Most notably, Mightier Than Sword has released two Blink 182 records on vinyl, along with The Ataris. The Juliana Theory,

In July 2011 the label announced it would be releasing a limited edition vinyl repressing of Take Off Your Pants and Jacket by Blink 182 on September 6, 2011. After the September release was not met, label owner RJ Crowder-Schaefer released a statement a month later on October 3 apologizing for no communication with customers, he then revealed that the release was still in the design stage and hadn't actually entered production but denied rumors that the release had been cancelled.

In February 2012 the label released another update claiming that delays had been caused by difficulty designing the package and custom sleeve to house the 3 separate 7" vinyl that would accompany the release. Crowder-Schaefer claimed as an apology to fans that Mark Hoppus had written an exclusive foreword for the release, however there was still no official date for the release. It was then reported on that online store ShopCastRadio.com had partnered with MTS for the release and that it would be shipping on April 10, 2012. After the new ship date passed it was claimed that the release had been cancelled leading Blink 182 to release a statement claiming that they were looking into the situation. In December 2012 Hoppus stated in an interview with Alternative Press that the record label, Mightier Than The Sword had gone bankrupt leading to fans never receiving their product or a straight up refund.

== Discography ==
| Artist | Title | Date | Format |
|---|---|---|---|
| Prevail Within | The Architects Of Broken Souls | June 20, 2006 | CD |
| Prevail Within/Smartbomb | Split | February 13, 2007 | 7" |
| Ris Paul Ric | Purple Blaze | May 15, 2007 | 180 gram LP |
| Smartbomb | Chaos And Lawlessness | February 19, 2008 | 70 gram 7” |
| Last Lights | Self-Titled | August 12, 2008 | 7" / digital EP |
| Within Walls | Set Me Free | December 16, 2008 | LP |
| Smartbomb | Diamond Heist | March 2, 2009 | LP |
| No Harm Done | Escape | March 26, 2009 | LP |
| O Pioneers!!! | Neon Creeps | April 7, 2009 | Cassette Tape |
| Last Lights | No Past. No Present. No Future. | May 26, 2009 | LP |
| In The Hollows | Self-Titled | November 17, 2009 | 7" / digital EP. |
| Mountain Man | Demo | July 26, 2009 | CD |
| Such Gold | Stand Tall | Digital Released: September 8, 2009/CD/7" Released: September 22, 2009 | CD / 7" / digital EP. |
| Blink 182 | Enema of the State | 1st Pressing Released: December 1, 2009/ 2nd Pressing Released: January 12, 2010 | LP |
| Take Notice | The Get-Go EP | December 15, 2009 | 7" |
| After The Fall | Collar City | January 5, 2010 | 7"/Digital EP |
| Blink 182 | Dude Ranch | January 12, 2010 | LP |
| Mountain Man | One | March 9, 2010 | 10"/Digital LP |
| The Juliana Theory | Understand This Is a Dream | March 23, 2010 | LP |
| The Ataris | Blue Skies, Broken Hearts...Next 12 Exits | April 13, 2010 | LP |
| No Trigger | Be Honest | December 14, 2010 | 7"/Digital EP |
| Bayonet | Bayonet | July 26, 2011 | 12"/Digital EP |
