= The Story So Far (band) =

American pop-punk band

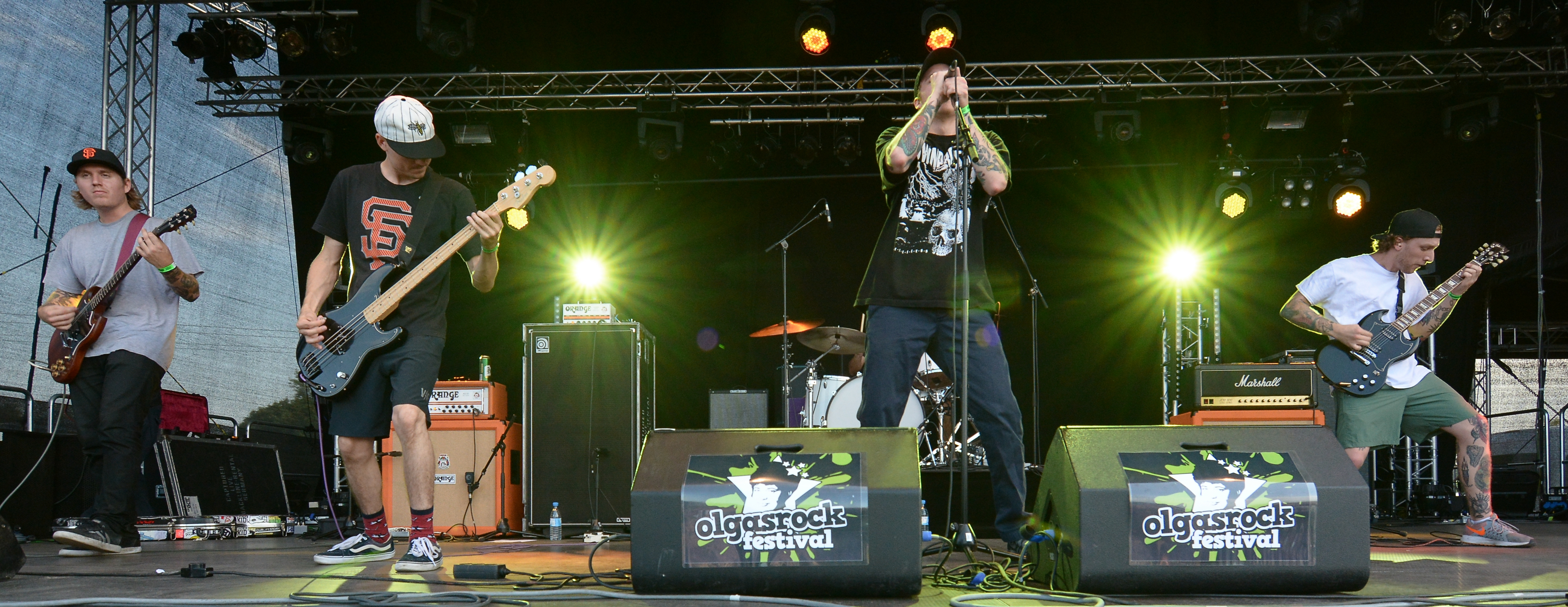
- The Story So Far at Olgas Rock 2015

Background information
- Origin: Walnut Creek, California, U.S.
- Genre: Pop-punk
- Years active: 2007–present
- Label: Pure Noise
- Spinoffs: No Pressure
- Members: Parker Cannon; Kevin Geyer; Will Levy; Ryan Torf
- Past members: Kevin Ambrose; Kelen Capener
- Website: thestorysofarca.com

The Story So Far is an American pop-punk band from Walnut Creek, California, formed in 2007. They are signed to Pure Noise Records and have released five studio albums.

== History ==
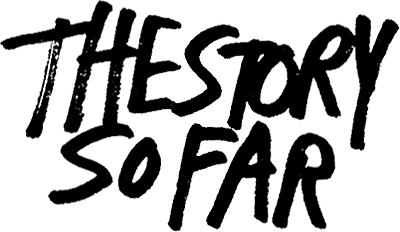
The Story So Far's logo from Under Soil and Dirt (2011).

=== Formation and early releases (2007–2010) ===
The Story So Far formed in Walnut Creek, California in 2007. Their name is taken from the New Found Glory song "The Story So Far". The band consisted of Parker Cannon on vocals, Kevin Geyer on lead guitar, Kevin Ambrose on rhythm guitar, Ryan Torf on drums, and Kelen Capener on bass. On December 22, the band released the 5 Songs EP. Ambrose parted ways with the band when he went to college in 2010 and was replaced by William Levy. In March 2010 it was announced the band had signed to Pure Noise. Two months later the band released an EP, While You Were Sleeping (2010). In November, the band released a split with Maker.

=== Under Soil and Dirt, What You Don't See and Songs Of EP (2011–2014) ===
Barrett Records released a split of The Story So Far and Morgan Foster in May 2011. Pure Noise released the band's debut album Under Soil and Dirt in June. On March 26, 2013, they released their second studio album, What You Don't See, which debuted at number 46 on the Billboard 200 chart in the U.S. They have also released a split with Stick to Your Guns on June 18. This split contains one new original song, Clairvoyant, and a cover of Pinback's song "Loro". The band was featured on the cover of Alternative Press' March 2013 issue "100 Bands You Need to Know." The band played the entire Warped Tour 2014 on the main stage.

On April 24, 2014, The Story So Far announced they would be releasing Songs Of, an acoustic EP on June 17 through Pure Noise. The record contains some acoustic versions of previous songs, as well as one new original song, "Navy Blue", and "Waiting in Vain", a Bob Marley and the Wailers cover.

=== The Story So Far (2015–2016) ===
On January 5, 2015, a video titled "The Story So Far Album Teaser #1" was uploaded on the band's official YouTube channel. The video shows multiple clips of the band members with friends goofing around and having fun. At the end of the video a text roll appears, saying "We are writing a new record stay tuned..." On February 23, 2015 a video titled "The Story So Far Album teaser #2" was uploaded on the same channel, showing behind the scenes-footage of the making of the album. On March 15, the band announced their self-titled album would be released on May 18, 2015. "Solo" and "Heavy Gloom" were uploaded to YouTube soon after. On May 11, the band released their full album to stream on their website ahead of the release date of May 19.

=== Proper Dose (2017–2021) ===
The band reportedly entered the studio to record their fourth studio album in April 2017. On September 13, 2017, the band released the song "Out of It". The track is included on a charity 7" vinyl, which was released on November 3.

The album, titled Proper Dose, was officially announced on July 12, 2018, and was released on September 21, 2018. Proper Dose debuted at number 19 on the Billboard 200 chart, but quickly declined, falling off the chart the following week. In efforts to promote the album, the band embarked on a European tour with supporting acts from Citizen and All Get Out. At the conclusion of their European tour, the band immediately started a U.S. tour with Movements, Citizen, and Turnover. On September 21, 2018 the band released their first music video from Proper Dose for their song "Upside Down", followed by music videos for "Take Me As You Please" and "Proper Dose" on November 8, 2018 and January 22, 2019, respectively. In September 2021, drummer Ryan Torf noted in an Instagram post that he would no longer be playing drums live for the band due to "injuries and surgeries to [his] hip and shoulder over the last few years". He did note, however, that he would continue playing drums on the band's recorded output.

=== Line-up change and I Want to Disappear (2022–present) ===
On May 31, 2022, bassist Kelen Capener announced on his Twitter page that he was no longer a member of the band. No official reason was given for his departure by the band. Capener was not officially replaced, with drummer Ryan Torf overtaking bass duties in studio and former Man Overboard bassist Nik Bruzzese joining the band in a touring capacity. In 2022, The Story So Far expanded to a live sextet for the first time in their history, with Torf moving to rhythm guitar. Set Your Goals drummer Mike Ambrose also joined the band as a touring musician.

In early 2023, guitarist Kevin Geyer alleged on the Two Week Notice podcast that the band were "contractually obligated" to release new music ahead of their tour in support of Blink-182. A new single, "Big Blind", was released on August 4, 2023. A new single, "Letterman", was released on March 21, 2024, along with a music video. On the same date, their new upcoming album was announced, titled I Want to Disappear. The album's third single, "All This Time", was released on May 8, 2024. The album, and a music video for "Watch You Go", were both released simultaneously on June 21, 2024.

The band is slated to make an appearance on the 2026 Vans Warped Tour.

== Style ==
Under Soil and Dirt (2011), What You Don't See (2013), and The Story So Far (2015) have all been described as pop-punk. With their fourth album, Proper Dose (2018), marking a departure from pop punk and saw the band incorporating indie rock into their sound. The Story So Far has also been described as having an "edgier" take on pop punk, due to their frequent incorporation of hardcore punk and punk rock elements in their music.

They cite influences including Title Fight, Set Your Goals, the Matches, Blink-182, Boxcar Racer, New Found Glory, First To Leave, the Fullblast, Living with Lions, Such Gold, Dillinger Four, Into It Over It, Lifetime, Comeback Kid, Guns Up, Thursday, Taking Back Sunday, Dr. Dre, Mac Dre and the Crestside rappers, Bob Marley, Mike Kinsella, Rush and Rocky Vatoloto.

== Members ==
The Story So Far at Olgas Rock 2015

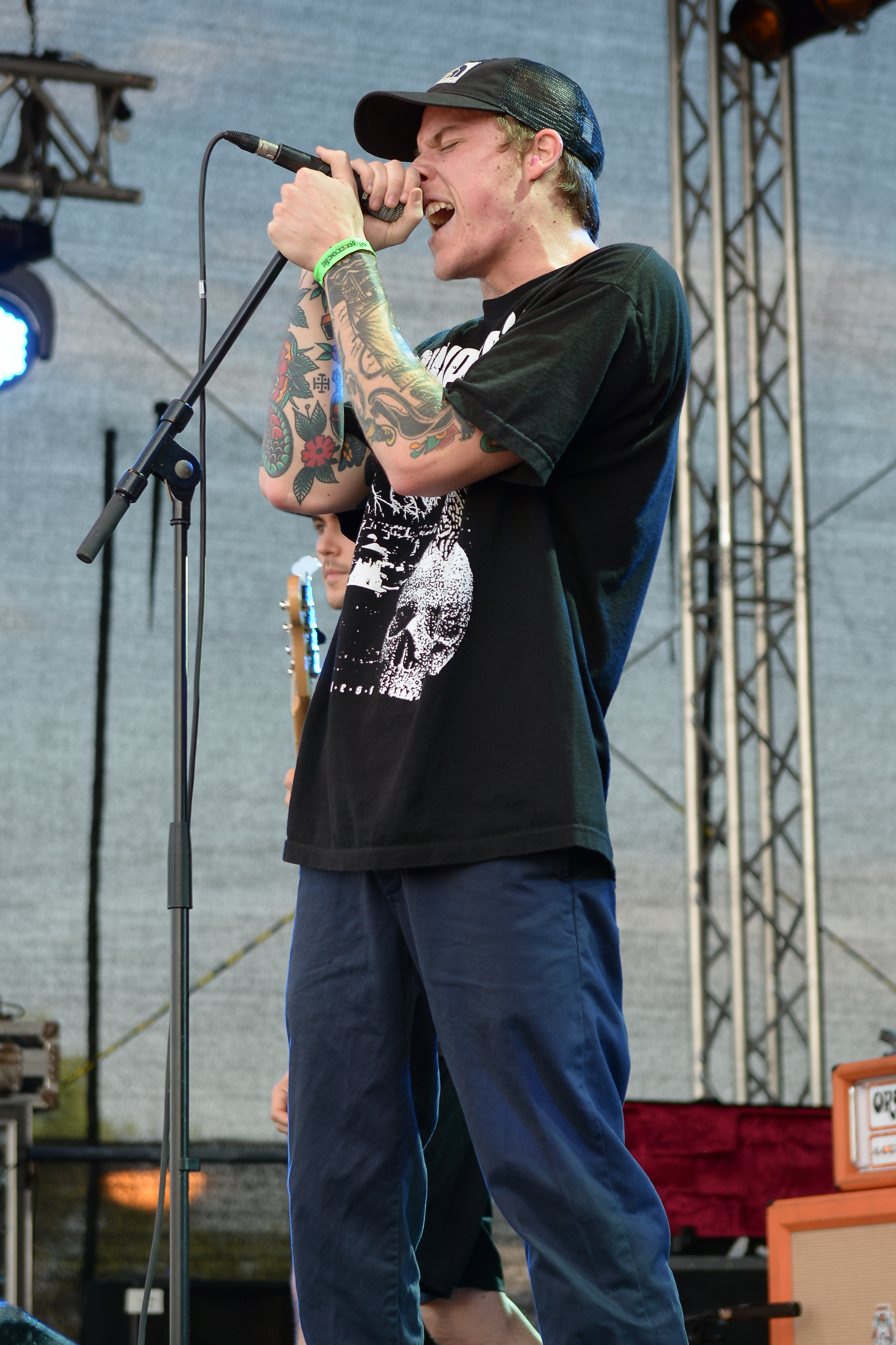
Parker Cannon

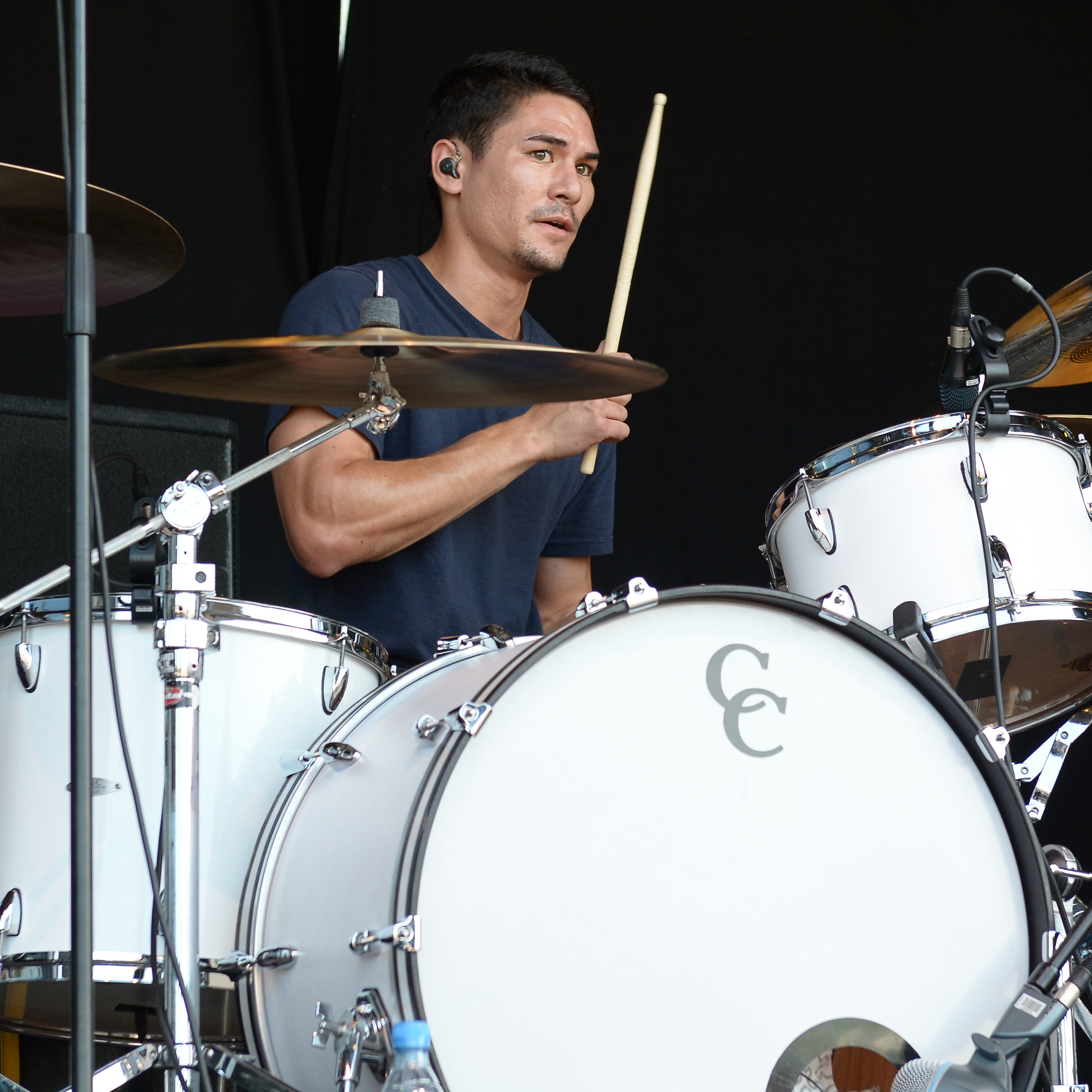
Ryan Torf

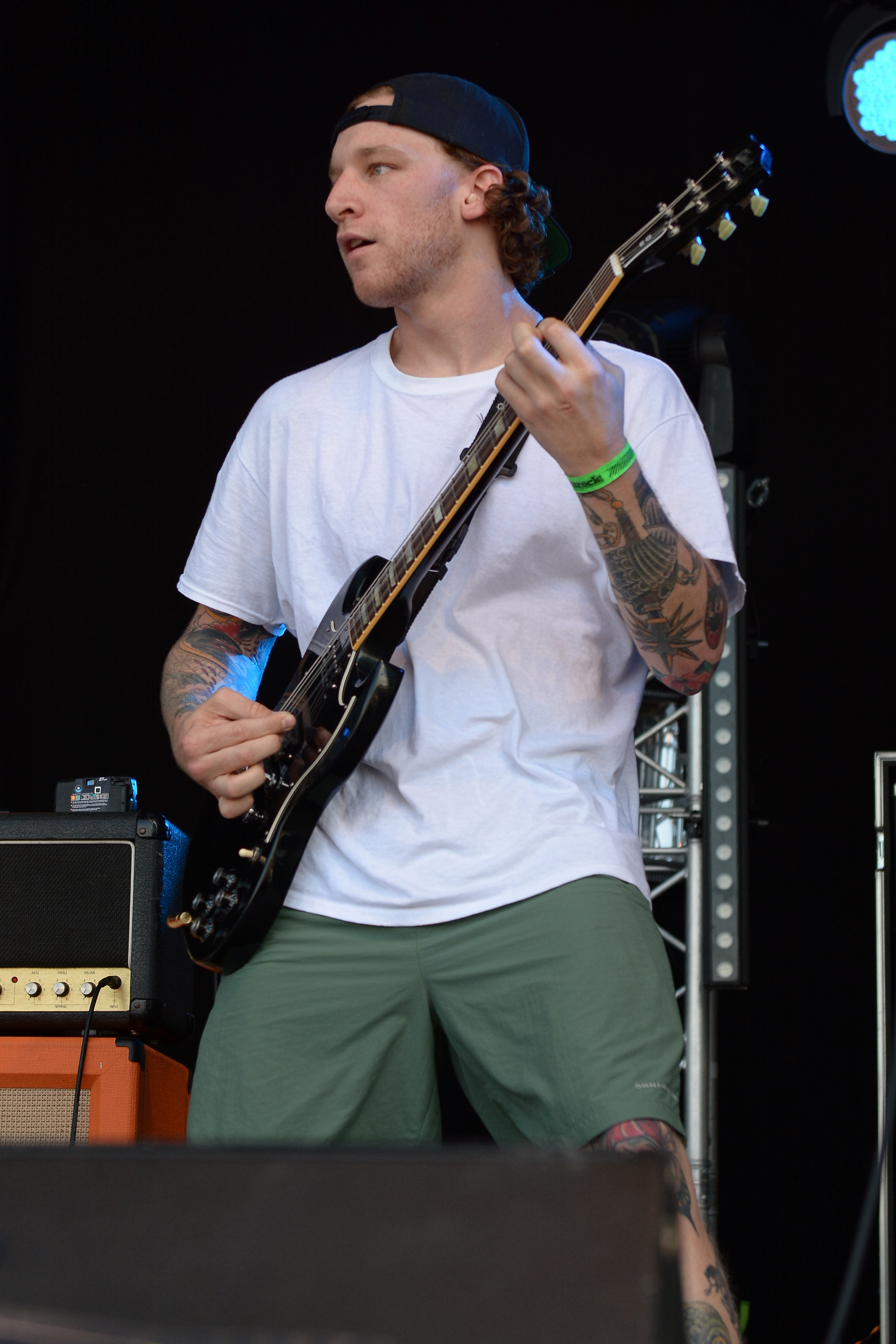
Will Levy

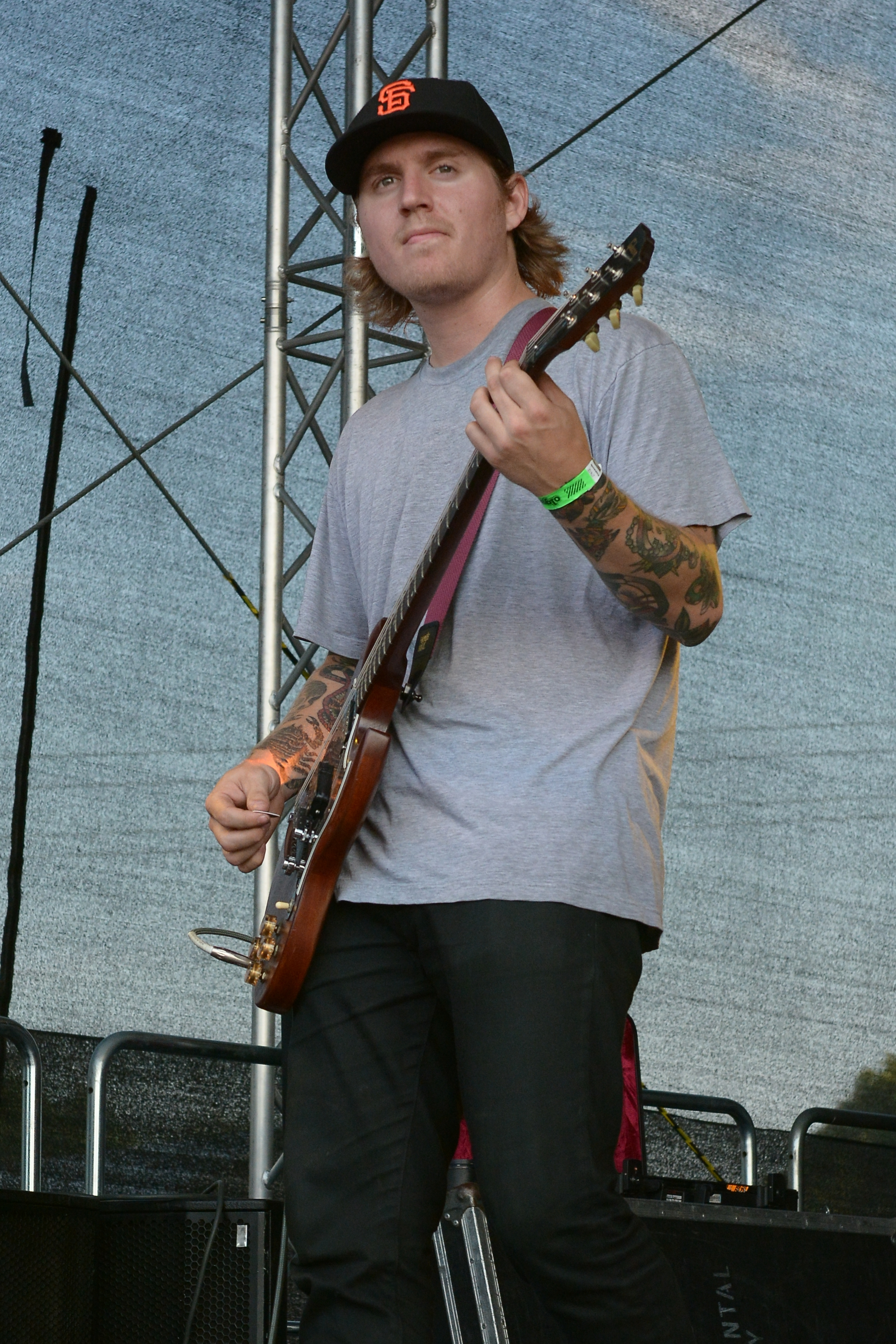
Kevin Geyer

Current members

- Parker Cannon – lead vocals (2007–present)
- Kevin Geyer – lead guitar, backing and occasional lead vocals (2007–present), keyboards (2018–present)
- Ryan Torf – drums, percussion (2007–present; 2022-present studio only), keyboards (2015–2022), bass (2022–present; in studio only), rhythm guitar (2022–present)
- Will Levy – rhythm guitar (2010–present), backing vocals (2010-2015)

Current touring musicians

- Nik Bruzzese – bass, backing vocals (2022–present)
- Ross Traver – drums (2024–present)

Former members

- Kevin Ambrose – rhythm guitar (2007–2010)
- Kelen Capener – bass (2007–2022)

Former touring musicians

- Morgan Foster – bass (2011–2012; substitute for Kelen Capener)
- Ryan Justice – drums (2011; substitute for Ryan Torf)
- Cameron Macbain – drums (2011–2012; substitute for Ryan Torf)
- Bo McDowell – rhythm guitar (2010; substitute for Will Levy)
- Mike Ambrose – drums (2015, 2022–2024)

== Discography ==
Studio albums

- Under Soil and Dirt (2011)
- What You Don't See (2013)
- The Story So Far (2015)
- Proper Dose (2018)
- I Want to Disappear (2024)
