= Such Gold =

American punk rock band

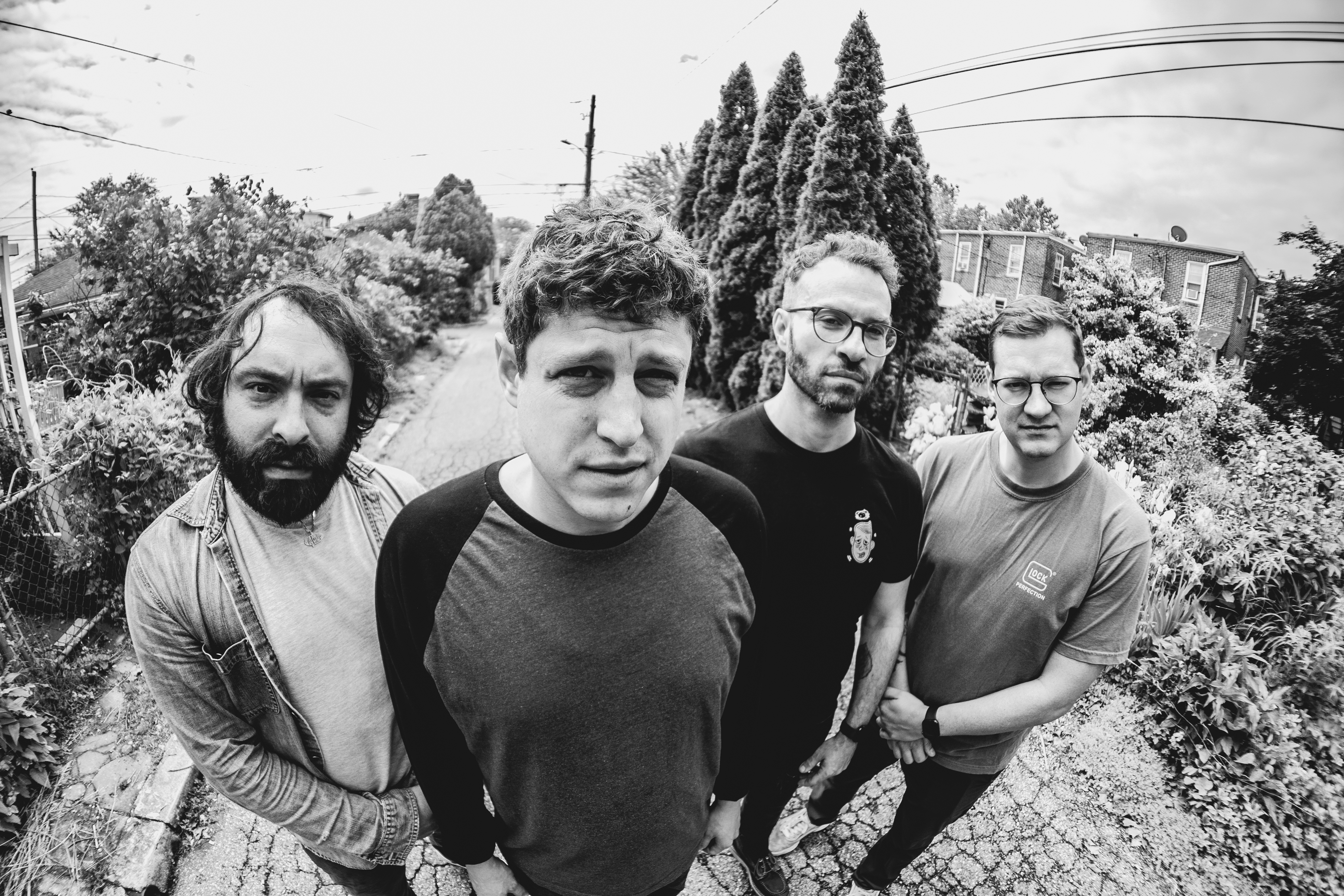

Background information
- Origin: Rochester, New York, U.S.
- Years active: 2009–present
- Members: Ben Kotin; Nate Derby; Jon Markson; Matt Covey
- Past members: Devan Bentley; Tim Heald; Devon Hubbard; Skylar Sarkis
- Website: such-gold.com

Such Gold is an American punk rock band from Rochester, New York, United States, currently consisting of Ben Kotin on guitar and vocals, Nate Derby on guitar, Jon Markson on bass and vocals and Matt Covey on drums.

== History ==
Such Gold formed officially in 2009, and self-released Demo 2009 in the Spring of that year.

The band signed to Mightier Than Sword Records in June 2009 and released a CD EP/7” titled “Stand Tall” in August 2009.

In Spring 2010 Such Gold announced signing to 6131 Records and recorded their new CD EP/12”, titled “Pedestals”; “Pedestals” was released digitally in September 2010, and physically in November 2010.

A series of split 7”s were announced in early 2011, including a split with Into It. Over It., released in May 2011 and a split with A Loss for Words, released November 2011. The splits were released as a collaboration between Mightier Than Sword Records and No Sleep Records, with the A Loss For Words split also being released on CD in Japan via Ice Grill$ Records.

Such Gold has toured the US extensively, have toured in Australia, Japan, UK/EU, Canada and Costa Rica, and have played a number of festivals including The Fest, Sound and Fury, Bled Fest, SXSW, Fragile Joe's House of Metal Fest, Blood Sweat and Beers and Groezrock.

The band signed to Razor & Tie records in July 2011, and announced an album to be released some time in 2012. In January 2012, Such Gold traveled to Los Angeles, California to record with highly acclaimed producer Steve Evetts. The album was Misadventures and was released on August 14, 2012.

In June 2013, it was announced that Skylar Sarkis left the band. Singer Ben Kotin has taken over on guitar.

Misadventures reached No. 6 on the Billboard Heatseekers chart.

In May 2014, the band announced the departure of drummer and founding member Devan Bentley, to be replaced by former Shai Hulud drummer, and current The Hempsteadys drummer, Matt Covey. Such Gold also announced they had entered The Blasting Room with producer Bill Stevenson to record their follow-up LP to 2012's Misadventures.

On September 9, 2016 the band released a compilation album on Bird Attack Records featuring their EP Pedestals and their splits with Into It. Over It. and A Loss For Words. The tracks from Pedestals have been remixed and remastered.

Their third EP, Deep in a Hole, produced and engineered by the band's bassist Jon Markson and mixed/mastered by The Blasting Room's Jason Livermore, marked a continuation in their exploration of math rock sensibility, over a pop-punk and melodic hardcore backbone. The EP was released on September 8, 2017 on Bird Attack Records.

== Members ==
Current

- Ben Kotin - vocals (2009–present), guitar (2013–present)
- Nate Derby - guitar (2009–present)
- Jon Markson - bass, vocals (2014–present)
- Matt Covey - drums (2014–present)

Past

- Tim Heald - guitar (2009-2011)
- Devan Bentley - drums (2009-2014)
- Skylar Sarkis - guitar, vocals (2011-2013)
- Devon Hubbard - bass, vocals (2009-2014)

== Discography ==
=== Studio albums ===
- Misadventures (2012)
- The New Sidewalk (2014)
- Pedestals (Deluxe Edition) (2016)

=== Extended plays ===
- Stand Tall (2009)
- Pedestals (2010)
- Deep In a Hole (2017)

=== Splits ===
- Into It. Over It. / Such Gold (with Into It. Over It.) (2011)
- Such Gold / A Loss for Words (with A Loss for Words) (2011)
- Placeholder / Such Gold (with Placeholder) (2014)

=== Music videos ===
- "Four Superbowls, No Rings" (2010)
- "Sycamore" (2011)
- "So Close" (2011)
- "Two Year Plan" (2012)
- "Survival of the Fondest" (2013)
- "You Are Your Greatest Threat (The Doctor Will Serve You Now)" (2013)
- "Faced" (2014)
- "Ceiling Stare" (2018)
- "Talk Loud" (2024)
