= Rough Landing, Holly =

Single by Yellowcard

from the album Lights and Sounds
- Released: May 6, 2006
- Recorded: 2005
- Genre: Pop-punk
- Length: 3:33
- Label: Capitol
- Songwriters: Ryan Key, Sean Mackin, Peter Mosely, Longineu W. Parsons III
- Producer: Neal Avron

Yellowcard singles chronology
"Lights and Sounds" (2005)	"Rough Landing, Holly" (2006)	"Light Up the Sky" (2007)

"Rough Landing, Holly" is a song by the American pop-punk band Yellowcard. The song was written collaboratively by all the band members for their fifth album, Lights and Sounds (2006). The track is built around an introductory guitar sound, followed by a soaring chorus, and heavy beating drums. "Rough Landing, Holly" is one of the songs from the album that is based on a character, Holly Wood, that Yellowcard had developed while working on Lights and Sounds. Despite its name, the song has nothing to do with the plane crash of Buddy Holly.

The song was released on May 6, 2006, as the second single from Lights and Sounds and reached number 27 on Billboard's Hot Modern Rock Tracks chart. Internationally, the track appeared for one week in the Australian and New Zealand charts at number 49. "Rough Landing, Holly" was well received by music critics, who noted the track's general sound. After its release, it was featured in the soundtrack of the 2006 video game, FlatOut 2.

The music video was directed by Marc Webb, who had previously collaborated with the band on their previous music videos. In an interview, Webb revealed the video was the sequel to the band's 2004 video "Ocean Avenue". Webb also revealed that unlike "Ocean Avenue", in which Key is running away from bad guys, this video shows Key running away from his "own personal demons".

== Background ==
While Yellowcard was working on their upcoming album, Lights and Sounds, they developed a character, Holly Wood, who served as a narrator and protagonist for the album's storyline. The character also came about when the band began writing about their hatred for life in Los Angeles. Vocalist Ryan Key, in discussion of the character, said, "Holly became this person on the record who appears in a lot of the songs, and at times you love her and at times you hate her. At times she's good to you and sometimes she's bad." Violinist Sean Mackin, also in discussion of the character, said: "...Ryan didn’t have a romantic interest in his life and he didn’t want to write 'Only One' again, and he wanted to create something new. A lot of songwriters narrate and create fictional characters ... and Holly was a character where sometimes you love her and sometimes you hate her, and she was someone he could get all his emotions out through." Key revealed that the song "Rough Landing, Holly", which features the Holly character, was his "favorite song" from Lights and Sounds.

Written in the key of E major, the beat is set in common time and moves at a moderate 175 beats per minute. The song's musical structure features an introductory guitar sound, followed by a soaring chorus, and heavy beating drums. Sean Mackin plays the violin in "Rough Landing, Holly". During discussion of the track listing in Lights and Sounds, Yellowcard revealed that "Rough Landing, Holly" spoke about the "difficulty of giving up its allure". The band explained the lyrics, "And I still can't get out / She's all I think about / Can't let her go/ ...She moves fast, takes control / And like a heart attack I know I can't turn back", were written because of that particular reason.

== Release and promotion ==
"Rough Landing, Holly" was released to radio on April 11, 2006. "Rough Landing, Holly" was released in the United States on May 6, as the second single from Lights and Sounds. The song peaked at number 27 on Billboard's Hot Modern Rock Tracks chart. Internationally, the track appeared on both the Australian Recording Industry Association (ARIA) and New Zealand charts at the number 49 position, and individually spent one week on the charts. "Rough Landing, Holly" was featured in the soundtrack of the 2006 video game, FlatOut 2.

The song received positive reception from critics. Jenny Eliscu of Rolling Stone wrote that "Rough Landing, Holly" and "Lights and Sounds", the latter being the title track, "boast seismic alt-rock riffs and mosh-worthy refrains." Tom Beaujor of Entertainment Weekly reported that the song was a "blustery tale of puppy love gone to the dogs that will surely make for a great ringtone." Sputnikmusic wrote: "So how typical to have the next song, 'Rough Landing, Holly', slap you right on the mouth with a face-melting violin solo. Yeah, a violin solo. And its pretty damn good. The beat follows right along with impossible-sounding drum rolls while the guitar distortion is the backbone of the song." In the Allmusic review, critic Heather Phares wrote, "...Yellowcard expands on its expected sound. Songs like the title track, 'Rough Landing, Holly,' and 'Down on My Head' are tightly crafted, state-of-the-art examples of shiny, earnest punk-pop that sounds sunny even when it's sad". Tony Pascarella of AbsolutePunk.net noted that "we see flashes of the 'old' band on 'Rough Landing, Holly', but it’s not nearly widespread enough for my liking (although the song is possibly the best one on the new album)." Bart Gottula of The Clarion commented that the song "is probably one of the best songs" off Lights and Sounds and concluded that it was because of its "effective use of every instrument, a soulful blend of guitar, and excellent lyrics."

== Music video ==
"It's about Ryan [Key] being chased by his problems and going through his past and his future to try and get away from them. The whole thing tells a story in a really unconventional way, with lots of really radical transitions."

— Director Marc Webb revealing the concept for the "Rough Landing, Holly" music video

The video for "Rough Landing, Holly" was shot in Los Angeles in February 2006. The music video was directed by Marc Webb, who had previously worked with Yellowcard on their earlier videos, "Ocean Avenue" (2004) and "Lights and Sounds" (2005). The video took three days to film in and around Los Angeles County.

In an interview with MTV News, Webb revealed that the video was a sequel of the music video "Ocean Avenue"; "The 'Holly' video expands on some of the elements of the 'Ocean Avenue' clip. There are references to it, particularly some scenes involving a suitcase. It refers to that world, and I liked the idea of paralleling the band's experiences over the past two years with some of the things [frontman] Ryan [Key] is going through in this video." Webb went on to add that the reason Key is sprinting through Los Angeles, once again, is not bad guys that are after him, it is his "own personal demons". Webb concluded that before filming began for the video, he had wanted to learn the experience that Key and bassist Peter Mosely were going through in New York, as they moved there to begin working on Lights and Sounds, and about the things they saw while they were there.

The video begins with Ryan Key lying on his bed in an apartment. Suddenly, he gets swallowed by the bedsheets (this is where the track starts to play). The scene then shifts to Key in another dimension, ending up next to the wife of another man. The man notices Key, and he runs away from the man. Hiding in the bathroom, Key escapes through a window, where he ends up on a neighborhood street. Someone dressed in dark clothing gestures to offer him a drink, when Key notices he is in a bar filled with Asian people. During part of the video, it features the band performing in front of a crowd wearing suits. The chase continues through a hallway, underwater, to a hospital bed, and back. The video is based in a scene of the 1999 film Being John Malkovich, where Cameron Diaz chases Catherine Keener within the subconscious of Malkovich.

== Track listing ==
AU Single:

1. "Rough Landing, Holly" – 3:33
2. "Holly Wood Died" (live) – 3:55
3. "Cigarette" (live) – 4:56

== Charts ==
Chart performance for "Rough Landing, Holly"
Chart (2006)	Peak position
Australia (ARIA)	49
US Alternative Airplay (Billboard)	27
