= Lights and Sounds (song) =

2005 single by Yellowcard

Single by Yellowcard

from the album Lights and Sounds
- Released: November 15, 2005
- Genre: Alternative rock
- Length: 3:28
- Label: Capitol
- Songwriters: Ben Harper; Ryan Key; Sean Mackin; Peter Mosely; Longineu W. Parsons III
- Producer: Neal Avron

Yellowcard singles chronology
"Only One" (2004)	"Lights and Sounds" (2005)	"Rough Landing, Holly" (2006)

"Lights and Sounds" is a song by American pop-punk band Yellowcard. The song was written collaboratively by all the band members for their fifth album, Lights and Sounds (2006). The track is built around a guitar riff, which is then followed with a repetitive drumming beat, then it is followed by a roaring guitar sound. The song's lyrics are based on the band coping with the success they were enduring when writing songs for their second album. It is also based on how they have aged in the process. "Lights and Sounds" also goes with what vocalist Ryan Key described as when he was preoccupied with making the album.

The song was released on November 15, 2005, and peaked at number four on the US Billboard Modern Rock Tracks chart, becoming the band's highest-charting song until "Better Days" topped the same chart in 2025. The song also peaked at number 50 on the Billboard Hot 100. Internationally, the track charted for one week in the UK Singles Chart, at number 56. It additionally appeared on the Australian and New Zealand charts. "Lights and Sounds" was well received by music critics, who noted the track's general sound.

The song won the 2006 Spike Video Game Award in the category for Best Song, after it was featured in the video game Burnout Revenge. During promotion for the band's album, the music video for "Lights and Sounds" was featured in a Verizon Wireless V-cast commercial. The music video was shot in October 2005 and the video is a performance-only video, in which the band play in a dark room with thin lights, a homage to the song's title.

== Background ==
In an interview with Rolling Stone magazine in June 2005, Yellowcard vocalist Ryan Key revealed that the song was written "really late in the process" when development of the album began. Key also talked about the sound featured in the song, saying: "...it's got such an amazing, driving, rock-&-roll vibe to it, with none of that frickin' pop-punk and alternative rock stigma. Secondly, I hate Yellowcard being tagged as an alternative rock band. It's just a great rock song. That's something we've been striving to write for a long time, so when we were done, it was a relief."

In another Rolling Stone interview, the band explained the meaning of the title track, saying that is based on a "whirlwind rocker about the pressures on the band members" and how they have changed as they have aged. Bassist Peter Mosely, in discussion of this, said: "We're older than people think we are. [...] We go through months of serenity, and then there'll be this one night where there will be evil." In another interview discussion about "Lights and Sounds", Key noted that it is "about a band like us coming into a career that we didn't think we'd have. You find yourself surrounded by a lot of false people, a lot of people who are not doing it for the same reasons you are. That song is about the struggle of not giving in to that." The band explained that the lyrics, "Make it new but stay in the lines / Just let go but keep it inside / Smile big for everyone / Even when you know what they've done / They gave you the end but not where to start / Not how to build, how to tear it apart", were written because of that particular reason. Key also revealed that the lyrics, "They gave you the end / But not where to start / Not how to build / But how to tear it apart", were references to bands Nofx and Bad Religion. Key also explained that when he was preoccupied by distractions, in which he referred to them as "lights and sounds", which ultimately resulted in the band naming the album and track title just that. Key also revealed that it was because that is how it surrounded the band, when working on the album.

== Release and reception ==
Yellowcard released "Lights and Sounds" in the United States on November 15, 2005, as the lead single of their fifth album. The song peaked at number four on Billboard's Hot Modern Rock Tracks chart. It also charted on Billboard's Hot 100 and Pop 100, reaching numbers 50 and 43, respectively. Internationally, the song was released in the United Kingdom on March 6, 2006, and appeared on the UK Singles Chart at number 56 for one week. "Lights and Sounds" was released in Australia on January 16, 2006, reaching number 24 on the ARIA Singles Chart. The track peaked on the New Zealand RIANZ Singles Chart at number 23. Afterward, the song spent 11 weeks on the chart, before leaving on April 19.

The song received positive reception from critics. In the Blender magazine review of the album, critic Andy Greenwald, wrote: "The title track [Lights and Sounds], bursting with buzzing distortion, builds into a satisfying anti-glitz rant." Tom Beajour of Entertainment Weekly reported that the song "crams all of the genre's essential tropes — distorted power chords, abrupt dynamic shifts, and singsong melodies — into three and a half minutes of radio-friendly fire." Chris Saunders of MusicOMH noted that the song is laden with "memorable hooks, quiet/loud dynamics and emotive lyrics which will no doubt cut through to many a disenchanted youth: 'They gave you the end but not the where to start / not how to build, how to tear it apart.'" Saunders concluded that the song "is as lively and rousing as most of their best tracks." Sputnikmusic wrote: "The adventure is only on the second track [Lights and Sounds] and the guys of Yellowcard are just getting started. This is by far the best tune on the album." Bart Gottula of The Clarion wrote: "The album's single and title cut, 'Light's and Sounds', follows with an amazing performance by every band member. The song provides a quick, hard-hitting beat that brings back Yellowcard's hybrid punk and emo music that the band explored in its previous single, 'Way Away'."

"Lights and Sounds" was featured on a Verizon Wireless Vcast commercial around the time of the album's release. The song was also featured in the video game Burnout Revenge and won the 2006 Spike Video Game Award for Best Song. The song is also featured in the 2010 video game Tony Hawk: Shred, and an episode of the teen drama One Tree Hill.

== Music video ==
The video for "Lights and Sounds" was shot on a Van Nuys, California sound stage in October 2005. Originally, the video was supposed to be directed by Ryan Key, when the time came to start production, it was instead directed by Marc Webb, who had previously worked with Yellowcard on their 2004 video for "Ocean Avenue". The video premiered on November 7, 2005, on MTV2.

In an interview with MTV News, Webb revealed that the band wanted a "performance video" and that they wanted to go back to their "rock roots". When asked the concept behind the video, Webb said: "They provided the sound and I provided the lights. A whole lot of lights. We used the same guy who did the lighting setup for Lenny Kravitz's 'Are You Gonna Go My Way?' and Coldplay's 'Speed of Sound.' But it's also rough around the edges — we used a bunch of different processes when developing the film." He also concluded with, "...it's a big performance video. But it's them performing inside of this wind-tunnel of light. It's a lot of smoke and mirrors, and a lot of camera tricks. There's a big light wall, streaks of light, xenon lighting effects and strobe lights. [...] But it's all wrapped around this very simple performance environment".

The video opens with a scene of the band in a stage room with a tunnel light, which is accompanied by the song playing in the background. The scene moves to the band grabbing their instruments, respectively. The band proceeds in performing the song. The scene then shifts to Key when he begins to sing. The camera shifts all around the room with different color lights, including a bullet hole scenery, as it then shifts to the band, as they continue performing. When Key sings "'Cause nobody's there" the light wall changes into a bright purple background. As the video shows the band continuing the song still at a fast pace, the effect is followed by a slow motion sequence. In the middle of the song, the lights are turned off, leaving the room pitch black. This is followed with the camera switching to the band members as they begin to play, once more, only with a bright yellow light on the tip of their instruments; the tips of the drum sticks that Parsons is holding also have yellow lights. As Key sings "I've got a way to work this out" blue lights emerge in the wall behind the group. The video ends with a focus on Key's microphone.

== Track listings ==
Australian CD single

1. "Lights and Sounds" – 3:28
2. "Three Flights Down" – 4:44
3. "When We're Old Men" – 3:32
4. "Lights and Sounds" (live) – 3:38

UK CD single

1. "Lights and Sounds" – 3:30
2. "When We're Old Men" – 3:32
3. "Lights and Sounds" (live) – 6:08
4. "Lights and Sounds" (video)

UK 7-inch single

A. "Lights and Sounds"
B. "Three Flights Down"

== Charts ==
=== Weekly charts ===
Weekly chart performance for "Lights and Sounds"
Chart (2005–2006)	Peak position
Australia (ARIA)	24
New Zealand (Recorded Music NZ)	23
Scottish Singles Sales (Official Charts)	41
UK Singles (Official Charts)	56
US Billboard Hot 100	50
US Alternative Airplay (Billboard)	4
US Pop 100 (Billboard)	43

=== Year-end charts ===
Year-end chart performance for "Lights and Sounds"
Chart (2006)	Position
US Modern Rock Tracks (Billboard)	24
