= Lift a Sail =

Studio album by Yellowcard
- Released: October 7, 2014
- Recorded: May 2014
- Studios: The Casita, EastWest
- Genres: Rock; alternative rock; pop rock; stadium rock
- Length: 47:24
- Label: Razor & Tie
- Producer: Neal Avron

Yellowcard chronology
| Ocean Avenue Acoustic (2013) | Lift a Sail (2014) | Yellowcard (2016) |

Singles from Lift a Sail
- 1. "One Bedroom" Released: August 17, 2014

Lift a Sail is the ninth studio album by American rock band Yellowcard. This was the band's first album without drummer Longineu W. Parsons III, who left the band in March 2014.

== Background ==
On March 13, 2014, it was announced that drummer Longineu W. Parsons III left Yellowcard to pursue "other musical interests". A week later, the group signed a multi-album deal with independent label Razor & Tie, scheduling a new album in the fall. Razor & Tie owners Cliff Chenfeld and Craig Balsam said that the band "rock the way we like it—with energy, hooks and attitude. They are total pros and we couldn't be more proud to work with them". On March 25, it was announced that Nate Young of Anberlin would play drums for Yellowcard's next album.

Sessions for Lift a Sail were held at The Casita, and EastWest Studios, with producer Neal Avron. Erich Talaba acted as the main engineer, with assistance from Scott Skrzynski and Wil Anspach. Avron mixed the recordings, before Ted Jensen mastered the album at Sterling Sound in New York City. On May 16, guitarist Ryan Mendez announced that the band had finished recording.

== Release ==
Between June and August, the group performed on Warped Tour. On August 1, the group posted a teaser for their upcoming album. Three days later, the album's title, Lift a Sail was revealed, and that it would be released in September. Another teaser for the album was posted on August 14. On September 9, "Make Me So" was made available for streaming. On the same day, "One Bedroom" was released to radio. On September 22, "Crash the Gates" was made available for streaming via Alternative Press. Lift a Sail was made available for streaming via Pandora Radio on September 29. On October 1, a music video was released for "One Bedroom". Alternative Press writer Matt Crane said the video "aligns the band with Invisible Children, who work to end the violent reign of Joseph Kony and his Lord’s Resistance Army in Africa".

Lift a Sail was then released on October 7 through record label Razor & Tie. In October and November, the band went on a co-headlining US tour with Memphis May Fire. They were supported by Emarosa. For the tour, the group enlisted the help of drummer Tucker Rule, formerly of Thursday. On October 30, a music video was released for "The Deepest Well". It was filmed during the group's tour with Memphis May Fire. On May 26, 2015, a music video was released for "California". In October and November, the group went on a co-headlining US tour with New Found Glory. They were supported by Tigers Jaw.

== Critical reception ==
Professional ratings
Aggregate scores
| Source | Rating |
|---|---|
| Metacritic | 72/100 |
Review scores
| Source | Rating |
| AbsolutePunk | 8.5/10 |
| AllMusic | 3.5/5 stars |
| Alternative Press | Favorable |
| The AU Review | 10/10 |
| Idobi | 7/10 |
| Rolling Stone Australia | 2/5 stars |
| Sputnikmusic | 4/5 |
| Ultimate Guitar Archive | 5.7/10 |

At Metacritic, which assigns a "weighted average" rating out of 100 to selected independent ratings and reviews from mainstream critics, the album has received a Metascore of 72, based on five reviews, indicating "generally favorable reviews". Three and a half star reviewer for AllMusic, James Christopher Monger, states: "The 13-track set adds some relatively subtle flourishes of electronics to the mix while dialing back a little on Sean Mackin's signature violin playing, but fans looking to conjure up some nostalgia for the band's Ocean Avenue heyday will find what they're looking for on standout cuts like the catchy and propulsive 'Make Me So,' the big-hearted 'Transmission Home,' and rousing 'Deepest Well'."

== Track listing ==
All music written by Ryan Key, Sean Mackin, and Ryan Mendez. All lyrics written by Key.

| No. | Title | Length |
|---|---|---|
| 1. | "Convocation" | 1:55 |
| 2. | "Transmission Home" | 4:18 |
| 3. | "Crash the Gates" | 3:20 |
| 4. | "Make Me So" | 3:11 |
| 5. | "One Bedroom" | 4:35 |
| 6. | "Fragile and Dear" | 4:04 |
| 7. | "Illuminate" | 4:06 |
| 8. | "Madrid" | 2:07 |
| 9. | "The Deepest Well (featuring Matty Mullins)" | 3:57 |
| 10. | "Lift a Sail" | 3:55 |
| 11. | "MSK" | 3:46 |
| 12. | "My Mountain" | 3:59 |
| 13. | "California" | 4:11 |

Japanese bonus track
| No. | Title | Length |
|---|---|---|
| 14. | "In Time" | 3:31 |

== Personnel ==
Personnel per booklet.

Yellowcard

- Ryan Key – lead vocals, guitar, programming, piano, percussion
- Sean Mackin – violin, backing vocals, strings arrangement, piano
- Ryan Mendez – guitar, bass, percussion
- Josh Portman – bass

Additional musicians

- Nate Young – drums
- Neal Avron – programming
- Diana Wade – viola
- Joann Whang – cello
- Matty Mullins – vocals on "The Deepest Well"

Production and design

- Neal Avron – producer, mixing
- Ted Jensen – mastering
- Erich Talaba – engineer
- Scott Skrzynski – assistant engineer
- Wil Anspach – assistant engineer
- William McMillin – cover art

== Chart performance ==
| Chart (2014) | Peak position |
|---|---|
| Australian Albums (ARIA) | 21 |
| Japanese Top Album Sales (Billboard Japan) | 52 |
| Scottish Albums (Official Charts) | 79 |
| UK Albums (Official Charts) | 75 |
| UK Album Downloads (Official Charts) | 84 |
| UK Independent Albums (Official Charts) | 19 |
| UK Rock & Metal Albums (OCC) | 8 |
| US Billboard 200 | 26 |
| US Top Rock Albums (Billboard) | 7 |
| US Top Alternative Albums (Billboard) | 4 |
