= Only One (Yellowcard song) =

Single by Yellowcard

from the album Ocean Avenue
- Released: January 10, 2004
- Recorded: 2003
- Studio: Sunset Sound, Hollywood, California
- Genre: Emo; pop-punk
- Length: 4:17
- Label: Capitol
- Songwriters: Ryan Key; Ben Harper; Peter Mosely; Longineu W. Parsons III; Sean Mackin
- Producer: Neal Avron

Yellowcard singles chronology
"Ocean Avenue" (2004)	"Only One" (2004)	"Lights and Sounds" (2006)

"Only One" is a song by American band Yellowcard, released as the third and last single from their 2003 album Ocean Avenue. The song was written partway through the recording sessions by lead singer Ryan Key about a "weird breakup" with an ex-girlfriend. Key has explained that it explores the difficult choice to end a relationship even when the other person hasn't done anything wrong, simply because one person needs space to "figure life out".

"Only One" was shortened, from 4:17 to 3:55, for radio airplay purposes. The violin solo in the bridge was cut. In this song, Key plays the bass.

== Background ==
In an interview with MTV News in May 2004, Key revealed that a riff for "Only One" was discovered by accident. "We were testing something else out and just tracked it right away. We then added a drum loop to it and just kept adding tracks. We built it track by track in the studio, and we've never really done that before." Key also noted that the song was based on one of his previous relationships; "It was a weird breakup. It was one of those where I felt like I had to do it, even though she didn't do anything wrong. I just needed some space to figure life out for a while on my own. And I think that's what the song says."

The following month, in a follow-up with MTV News, the band revealed that the song was one of their "chick song[s]" off Ocean Avenue. Ryan Key in discussion of the song, said that rather than rage or mend, the song simply sets out to apologize; The lyric, "Made my mistakes, let you down / And I can't, I can't hold on for too long / Ran my whole life in the ground / And I can't, I can't get up when you're gone", were written in the theme of apologizing. In the same interview, Key said: "We usually have everything written, ready to go before we go in there [studio], but it was really fun because we built it from the ground up. It's a cool, different song for us. It's been real challenging for us to play live because we never really practice it, which keeps it fresh."

"Only One" is a ballad and the music featured is heavily coated with string arrangements.

== Release and promotion ==
Yellowcard released "Only One" in the United States in June 2004 as the third single from Ocean Avenue. "Only One" peaked at number 15 on the US' Billboard's Hot Modern Rock Tracks chart and number 28 on the Mainstream Top 40 (Pop Songs).

The song received positive reviews from critics. Nick Madsen of IGN, in review of the album, wrote: "...'Only One', Ryan Key weaves a sad tale of love lost by choice. One of the few depressing songs on the album this track sees Key stealing the show with heart-wrenching melodies and desperate vocals. Honesty is a trend throughout this album and this song is a prime example of how sincerity can up the ante in the emotional department." Tekindra Jones of The Daily Vidette, wrote: "The song that stuck out the most to me on this CD was 'Only One'. The song is about another romantic relationship coming to an end. The lyrics explore the ensuing frustration which occurs when two people are in love but cannot make their relationship work. The music provided an excellent illustration of the need to let go as it was described in the lyrics."

On May 1, 2012, "Only One" was added as a downloadable song for Rock Band 3.

== Music video ==
The music video for "Only One" was directed by Phil Harder and was filmed at the Paramount Pictures studio lot prior to the band's European tour. According to Key, the video was "a love story that is surrounded by a lot of chaos and confusion". It was the first Yellowcard music video to feature bassist Pete Mosely, who had just rejoined the band. It is also the last video to feature Ben Harper on lead guitar, who split from the group before the release of their follow-up album Lights and Sounds. The video also stars actress Rachel Miner.

== Track listing ==
1. "Only One"
2. "View from Heaven" (Acoustic - from AOL session)
3. "Miles Apart" (Live - from Electric Factory)

== Personnel ==
Adapted credits from the liner notes of Ocean Avenue.

Yellowcard

- Ryan Key – lead vocals, guitar, bass
- Sean Mackin – violin, backing vocals
- Ben Harper – lead guitar
- Longineu W. Parsons III – drums

Additional musicians

- Peter Mosely – piano, vocals
- Christine Choi – cello
- Rodney Wirtz – viola
- Sean Mackin – string arrangement
- Neal Avron – string arrangement

== Charts and sales ==
=== Peak positions ===
Chart (2005)	Peak position
Bubbling Under Hot 100 Singles	22
U.S. Billboard Modern Rock Tracks	15
U.S. Billboard Mainstream Top 40 (Pop Songs)	28

=== Certifications ===
Country	Certification	Date	Sales certified
U.S.	Gold	June 30, 2005	500,000 +
