= HeyMike! =

- Origin: Ventura County, California, United States
- Genres: Punk rock; pop-punk
- Years active: 1998–2001; 2003–present
- Label: Takeover
- Spinoff of: Craig’s Brother; Stole Your Woman
- Members: Steven Neufeld; Ben Harper; Josh McDonald; Justin "Juice" Cabrera
- Past members: Tim Wright; Warren Cooke; T.J Arriaga; Brandon Henderson; Ben Secret; Jason Turner; Derek Vaughn

HeyMike! is an American punk rock band based in Ventura County, California, United States. The band's name was originally used by singer/guitarist Steven Neufeld as the title of his early demo tapes from 1998-2001. HeyMike! resurfaced when Neufeld, bassist Josh McDonald, and drummer Justin "Juice" Cabrera signed to Takeover Records and published two records titled "Embrace Your Hooks," (EP) released in 2004, and HeyMike, released in 2006. Their third issue, Pop and Circumstance was released April 19, 2011.

== History ==
=== Early years (1998-2001) ===
Neufeld began to record and release demo tapes under the name "HeyMike!" in 1998. He was joined by drummer Ben Secret, guitarist Jason Turner and bassist Derek Vaughn, and their music appeared on internet sites such as GarageBand.com and MP3.com. The music charted on the indie sites in 2000 which gave HeyMike! some early success.

Juice and Neufeld both joined the Tooth & Nail band Craig's Brother after the departure of their guitarists (Ryan Key and Dan McLintock) and drummer (Heath Konkel). Being a Christian label with close connections with The Family, the band was dropped after a picture of Juice flipping the bird at the camera was uploaded to their website. He was later fired by singer and frontman Ted Bond via an announcement on a live radio show at KMBY 104.3, after failing to show up. Steven stayed with the band, which eventually disbanded in 2001.

=== Takeover Records (2003-2006) ===
In 2003, Juice contacted Steven in an attempt to start a new band. Stole Your Woman's lead singer Travis Dixon suggested to Juice that McDonald from Ventura's own All in Good Time play bass. The trio signed to Takeover Records and decided to perform under the name, HeyMike!. After a mere five months, they recorded the EP, "Embrace Your Hooks" which was released in June 2004. They toured extensively, headlining club tours, playing Warped Tour dates and touring with bands like AutoPilot off, The Starting Line and Yellowcard

Steven remained a close collaborator with Craig's Brother after they reformed. He helped them to record their Takeover release E.P.idemic and played with them as much as his schedule with HeyMike! allowed. Disputes between the band and Juice have also been settled.

2005 saw the band record their freshmen full-length album self-titled HeyMike!. The trio also became a quartet when Brandon Henderson was added to the band early in 2005. The single "Carry Love" was released in mid-2005 as things were looking up for the band; however they took a hiatus before the release of the actual album. The band reformed with new bassist T.J. Arriaga; but the release of their debut full length would not come out on Takeover Records until August 2006. After touring the album late in 2006 the band took another hiatus.

=== Recent history (2007-present) ===
In late 2007, after trying out new lineups and new music, HeyMike! added former Yellowcard guitarist and owner of Takeover Records, Ben Harper as the new lead guitarist. They also briefly enlisted Warren Cooke in 2008, also of Yellowcard, before he decided to move back to Jacksonville, Florida, to be with his family. The band reconstructed the original trio in 2009 when Josh McDonald came back to the band to continue his bass playing duties. Ben Harper remained with the band and the quartet toured in the United States and Japan throughout 2009. In 2010, HeyMike! finished recording their third record and second album, Pop and Circumstance. They also toured in Europe and played a limited number of shows in the United States. HeyMike! released Pop and Circumstance on April 19, 2011.

== Current members ==
- Steven Neufeld - Vocals, guitar
- Ben Harper - Lead guitar
- Josh McDonald - Bass guitar, vocals
- Juice - Drums, percussion

== Former members ==
- Tim Wright
- Warren Cooke
- T.J Arriaga
- Brandon Henderson
- Ben Secret
- Jason Turner
- Derek Vaughn
- Ben Aigboboh

== Discography ==
- "Embrace Your Hooks" (2004)
- HeyMike! (2006)
- Pop and Circumstance (2011)
