= Where We Stand =

Studio album by Yellowcard
- Released: July 20, 1999
- Genres: Hardcore punk; punk rock
- Length: 32:36
- Label: Takeover
- Producer: Sean Dewey

Yellowcard chronology
Midget Tossing (1997)	Where We Stand (1999)	One for the Kids (2001)

Professional ratings
Review scores
Source	Rating
AllMusic	2.5/5 stars
IGN	4.6/10
Punknews.org	3.5/5 stars

Where We Stand is the second studio album by American rock band Yellowcard. It was released in 1999 (and re-released in 2004 and 2005). It was released by Takeover Records, a label created by one of the band's guitarists, Ben Harper. This is the last release to feature vocalist Ben Dobson, whose position would later be taken over by guitarist/vocalist Ryan Key. The songs "Sue" and "Uphill Both Ways" were re-recorded, originally appearing on Yellowcard's first album, Midget Tossing. The reissue was reissued by kung Fu Records in 2004-2005 (as previously said). It included rare, never before seen footage of the band playing and came as a enhanced CD. It was produced to capitalize off the fame of Ocean avenue. It is a common CD, often found on sites like Discogs, Ebay, and other platforms.

== Track listing ==
All tracks are written by Yellowcard.

No.	Title	Length
1.	"Lesson Learned"	3:22
2.	"Time Will Tell"	3:58
3.	"Sue"	2:24
4.	"April 20th" (Sometimes stylized as April 20Th)	2:55
5.	"Uphill Both Ways"	3:58
6.	"Kids"	2:42
7.	"Doesn't Matter"	2:54
8.	"Sorry Try Again"	1:44
9.	"Anywhere but Here"	3:13
10.	"On the Brink"	7:27
Total length:		34:38

== Personnel ==
- Ben Dobson — lead vocals
- Benjamin Harper — lead guitar
- Sean Mackin — violin, backing vocals
- Todd Clary — rhythm guitar
- Warren Cooke — bass guitar
- Longineu W. Parsons III — drums
