= How I Go =

How I Go may refer to:

== Albums ==
- How I Go (Kenny Wayne Shepherd album), 2011

== Songs ==
- "How I Go", a song by Yellowcard from Lights and Sounds
