= Ocean Avenue Acoustic =

Studio album by Yellowcard
- Released: August 13, 2013
- Recorded: December 2012 – May 2013
- Studios: Robert Berson, Eli's Place, Room 219
- Genre: Acoustic rock
- Length: 49:24
- Label: Hopeless
- Producers: Ryan Key; Erich Talaba

Yellowcard chronology
Southern Air (2012)	Ocean Avenue Acoustic (2013)	Lift a Sail (2014)

Ocean Avenue Acoustic is an acoustic reinterpretation by Yellowcard of their fourth studio album, Ocean Avenue (2003). It is the band's last recorded material with founding drummer Longineu Parsons III.

== Production ==
Sessions for Ocean Avenue Acoustic were held at Robert Berson Studios, Eli's Place, and Room 219 at The Inn at Renown Regional Medical Center. It was produced by Ryan Key and Erich Talaba, who also handled recording and mixing. The album was mastered by Paul Leavitt.

== Release and reception ==
Professional ratings
Aggregate scores
Source	Rating
Metacritic	60/100
Review scores
Source	Rating
AllMusic	3.5/5 stars
Rock Sound	6/10
Sputnikmusic	4/5

On May 3, 2013, the group responded to rumours in regards to an acoustic version of Ocean Avenue, stating "[W]e had a better plan to tell you, but its true". They also said that further information would follow. On June 3, the band formally announced the release of Ocean Avenue Acoustic, a record that contained acoustic versions of songs that appeared on Ocean Avenue. A trailer for the album was posted online later in the day. On July 23, the title-track was released as a single. Ocean Avenue Acoustic was made available for streaming via YouTube on August 6, before being released on August 13 through Hopeless Records.

Following a series of festival shows, the band embarked on headlining US and Australian tours in September and October. These tours, which were supported by Geoff Rickly of Thursday, featured Ocean Avenue performed in its entirety acoustically, followed by an electric set of songs from their other records. Proceeding this, the group went on Warped Tour in Europe in November. In January and February 2014, the band went on a second leg of the Ocean Avenue Acoustic tour in the US, with support from What's Eating Gilbert.

The album received a Metacritic score of 60 based on 5 reviews, indicating mixed or average reviews. The album debuted at #53 on the Billboard 200, with 7,000 copies sold, 4,000 of which were downloads. It also debuted at No. 11 on both the Rock Albums and Independent Albums charts.

== Track listing ==
All lyrics by Ryan Key, all music by Yellowcard.

No.	Title	Length
1.	"Way Away Acoustic"	3:26
2.	"Breathing Acoustic"	3:44
3.	"Ocean Avenue Acoustic"	3:39
4.	"Empty Apartment Acoustic"	3:37
5.	"Life of a Salesman Acoustic"	3:30
6.	"Only One Acoustic"	4:18
7.	"Miles Apart Acoustic"	3:41
8.	"Twentythree Acoustic"	4:01
9.	"View from Heaven Acoustic"	3:33
10.	"Inside Out Acoustic"	3:41
11.	"Believe Acoustic"	4:31
12.	"One Year, Six Months Acoustic"	3:29
13.	"Back Home Acoustic"	4:14
Total length:		49:24

== Personnel ==
Personnel per booklet.

Yellowcard

- Ryan Key – lead vocals, guitar
- Sean Mackin – violin, backing vocals, string arrangements
- Ryan Mendez – guitar
- Longineu W. Parsons III – drums

Additional musicians

- Neal Avron – string arrangements
- C.J. Vanston – piano (track 12)
- Rodney Wirtz – viola
- Christina Lightner – cello
- Tiffany Villarreal – additional vocals (track 9)

Production and design

- Ryan Key – producer
- Erich Talaba – producer, recording, mixing
- Paul Leavitt – mastering
- Joshua Stern – photography
- Brian Manley – artwork, design

== Charts ==
Chart (2013)	Peak position
UK Independent Albums (Official Charts)	25
US Billboard 200	53
US Top Alternative Albums (Billboard)	7
US Independent Albums (Billboard)	11
US Top Rock Albums (Billboard)	11
