= The Underdog EP =

EP by Yellowcard
- Released: July 2, 2002
- Recorded: April 22, 2002
- Genre: Pop punk emo-pop
- Length: 19:26
- Labels: Fueled by Ramen, Below Par
- Producer: Nick Rucker

Yellowcard chronology
One for the Kids (2001)	The Underdog EP (2002)	Ocean Avenue (2003)

The Underdog EP is an extended play (EP) released in 2002 by American pop punk band Yellowcard. The EP was heard by a representative from Capitol Records, leading to them being signed to their first major label later that year. The release was the final to feature bassist Warren Cooke, who left the band a few months after its release.

== Reception ==
Professional ratings
Review scores
Source	Rating
AbsolutePunk	(84%)

Absolute Punk gave a positive review, praising Mackin's violin performance and Key's vocals.

In a retrospective ranking of the top 100 Yellowcard songs, Sputnik Music stated "The Underdog EP possesses crossover appeal among fans because it has the punk feel of their earliest records but the melodies also start to shine through. It's about equidistant from One for the Kids and Ocean Avenue. They ranked the songs as follows: "Underdog (81st, " the title track features all of those traits but lacks a defining hook"), "Avondale" (70th,"Everything about this track echoes with the glory of Yellowcard's peak early punk days, and the transition from long and drawn out (but memorable!) chorus of "mighty king of Avondale" to the dueling, layered choruses make this song way too much fun to sing along to."), "Rocket" (64th, "The verses early in this song almost remind me of Clarity-era Jimmy Eat World, which is obviously a huge plus. I love how the acoustic guitars shimmer and shine as the song gradually picks up in intensity until Key is borderline shouting the chorus. This is Yellowcard's lo-fi emo moment, and it's spectacular."), "Finish Line" (61st, ""Finish Line" has it all: beautiful violins, heavy waves of electric guitar, and super catchy verses/choruses."), and "Powder" (57th, "This is another highlight from the band's earlier discography. "Powder" features an addicting beat driven not by drums but rather by repetitive guitar crunches, and there's a gorgeous swell of violins late in the song. To boot, the chorus is an earworm. This is one of the catchiest and most unique songs in the band's repertoire.")

HM Magazine listed "Avondale" and "Powder" amongst essential Yellowcard tracks in 2016.

== Track listing ==
All lyrics are written by Ryan Key; all music is composed by Yellowcard.

No.	Title	Length
1.	"Underdog"	3:10
2.	"Avondale"	3:50
3.	"Finish Line"	3:46
4.	"Powder"	3:51
5.	"Rocket"	4:49
Total length:		19:26

== Personnel ==
Yellowcard

- Ryan Key – lead vocals, rhythm guitar
- Ben Harper – lead guitar
- Warren Cooke – bass guitar
- Sean Mackin – violin, backing vocals
- Longineu W. Parsons III – drums, percussion

Additional personnel

- Nick Rucker – producer, engineer, mixing, keyboards, additional percussion
- Mark Chalecki – mastering
