= Way Away =

Single by Yellowcard

from the album Ocean Avenue
- B-side: "Hey Mike"
- Released: October 27, 2003
- Recorded: 2003
- Genre: Pop-punk
- Length: 3:22
- Label: Capitol; Parlophone (UK)
- Songwriters: Ryan Key; Ben Harper; Peter Mosely; Longineu W. Parsons III; Sean Mackin
- Producer: Neal Avron

Yellowcard singles chronology
"Way Away" (2003)	"Ocean Avenue" (2004)

"Way Away" is the debut single by American band Yellowcard. It is the opening track of their fourth album Ocean Avenue. "Way Away" was released to radio on July 22, 2003. The song and music video both reflect the band's choice about leaving their hometown of Jacksonville, Florida to California in hopes of making a name for themselves in the Southern California music scene.

The song was featured on the video game soundtracks to both Madden NFL 2004 and SSX 3.

== Background ==
In an interview, former Yellowcard lead guitarist Ben Harper said that "Way Away" is "about our band and facing the people who didn't believe in what we were doing. That's kind of like an ode to disbelievers." In another interview, vocalist Ryan Key, in discussion of the song, said: "It's the story we have sort of been through as a band in the last couple of years, moving from our hometown in [Jacksonville,] Florida, out to [Southern] California and starting to tour really hard and just sort of following our dreams. Hopefully other people will take that song and apply it to their own lives and be able to kind of get out of whatever they are stuck in and don't want to be in." Key also revealed that the song was "harder than some of our other songs, [whereas] 'Ocean Avenue' is kind of in the middle of the spectrum of where the record goes."

== Track listing ==
1. "Way Away" - 3:22
2. "Hey Mike" - 4:01
3. "Avondale" (Acoustic) - 3:37
4. "Way Away" (Video)
5. Behind the Scenes Footage (Video)

== Music video ==
Directed by Patrick Hoelck, The video starts out with the band members pulling up in a Vista Cruiser car in a vacant parking lot and begin setting up their gear and start playing in front of a supermarket. The band's frontman, Ryan Key is shown in from several scenes of the video showing him loading his car and moving away from his job, family, and his girlfriend and writing the lyrics of "Way Away". The video ends after Ryan and band are singing to a self-image of himself and drives away in the distance.

The video was shot in front of the "Super A Foods" Market store in Los Angeles, California on July 1, 2003.

== Reception ==
Allmusic gave the song a positive review, by saying "[Way Away] thrives on the basics of rock & roll — foliated guitars weaved in between high-speed percussion." Chris Conlon of the Telegraph Herald said he was "dumbfounded" when he listened to the song. Conlon goes on to say, "The song basically says that you are the master of your destiny, that no one can stand in your way."

=== Weekly charts ===
Chart (2003–04)	Peak position
US Alternative Airplay (Billboard)	25
UK Singles (OCC)	63

== See also ==
- "Time Stands Still", a 2003 song by another pop-punk band The All-American Rejects with the music video has similar premise.
- "Just Like You", a 2003 song by Canadian rock band Three Days Grace with the music video has similar premise.
