= One for the Kids =

Studio album by Yellowcard
- Released: April 3, 2001
- Studio: Stall No. 2, Redondo Beach, California
- Genre: Punk rock
- Length: 41:22
- Label: Lobster
- Producer: Darian Rundall

Yellowcard chronology
Where We Stand (1999)	One for the Kids (2001)	The Underdog EP (2002)

20th Anniversary Edition album cover

One for the Kids is the third studio album by American rock band Yellowcard. It was released on April 3, 2001 on Lobster Records and is the first Yellowcard album to include Ryan Key as lead singer and guitarist. It was produced, engineered and mixed by Darian Rundall at Stall No. 2 in Redondo Beach, California. "Drifting" and "Rock Star Land" both originally appeared on the band's previous EP, Still Standing EP. In 2021, Takeover Records reissued One for the Kids for celebrate its 20th anniversary and remastered the album.

== Background ==
Yellowcard released their first two albums – Midget Tossing (1997) and Where We Stand (1999) – through guitarist Ben Harper's label Takehold Records. Following this, vocalist Ben Dobson was replaced by Ryan Key in early 2000. Key had played shows with Yellowcard while in the high school act Modern Music; Takehold had previously released a cassette for Modern Music. Bassist Warren Cooke's brother was close friends with Stevan Lubarsky, who ran the Californian-based label Lobster Records. On June 15, 2000, Yellowcard signed to Lobster Records, and were aiming to release their next album in early 2001. The band moved from their native Florida to Thousand Oaks, California to record the album. Sessions where held at Stall No. 2 in Redondo Beach, California, with producer and engineer Darian Rundall. He mixed the recordings, before the album was mastered by Mark Chalecki at Capitol Records in Hollywood, California.

In a 2011 interview, violinist Sean Mackin described the album: "One for the Kids was a really big album for us. [...] We were just high school kids. When we decided to make a run at being in a band, we signed to a record label, Lobster Records. They had full distribution, and we started recording as a different style of band than when we first started. That was very punk-rock-focused, kind of extra adolescent? When Ryan joined the band, it brought a different kind of songwriting that allowed us to showcase our different sorts of influences. It's an important part of Yellowcard and, really, the version of our band that most people know."

== Release ==
On February 23, 2001, One for the Kids was announced for released in a month's time. In addition to this, "October Nights" was made available for download through the band's MP3.com profile. One for the Kids was initially scheduled for released in March 2001, before being eventually released on April 3, 2001. $15,000 had been spent making the album and promoting it, with the band helping the label (which consisted of two employees) stuff envelops and ship posters. After the album's release, the band embarked on their first full-length tour, alongside Rise Against and Mad Caddies. In July and August 2001, the band toured the southern states with Inspection 12. In November 2001, the band went on a two-week tour of the US west coast with Bordem. On November 18, 2003, One for the Kids was reissued as an enhanced CD. It was pressed on vinyl for the first time in 2012, as joint release between label Shop Radio Cast and Lobster Records.

It was announced on November 19, 2021, that a 20th Anniversary remixed/remastered reissue of One For the Kids was in production by Lobster Records for a summer 2022 release.

== Reception ==
Professional ratings
Review scores
Source	Rating
AllMusic	2.5/5 stars
Sputnikmusic	3/5

AllMusic stated the album is "full of hooks and catchy choruses as strong as any of the syrupy sweet punk bands around southern California." and compared the sound of the album to Dave Matthews Band. Sputnikmusic praised the band's inclusion of the violin and stated the album was a "rough draft of Ocean Avenue". Exclaim! also praised the band's use of violin, stating "not since FM's Nash the Slash donned bandages has the electric violin been used so effectively in rock music." as well as stating the album had "above average, melodic punk, fusing energy and enthusiasm with creative chord progressions, classically-inspired riffs and harmonies aplenty HM included the song "Something of Value" on the list of essential Yellowcard songs in a retrospective career review.

== Track listing ==
All music by Yellowcard, all lyrics by Ryan Key.

No.	Title	Length
1.	"Starstruck" (stylized on the album as "★ Struck")	2:48
2.	"Drifting"	3:29
3.	"Something of Value"	3:30
4.	"Trembling"	2:26
5.	"Sureshot"	3:19
6.	"Big Apple Heartbreak"	3:44
7.	"Cigarette"	3:53
8.	"October Nights"	3:29
9.	"Rock Star Land"	3:39
10.	"For Pete's Sake"	3:51
11.	"A.W.O.L."	3:01
12.	"Rough Draft" (+hidden track)	4:13
Total length:		41:22

2003 reissue track separation
No.	Title	Length
12.	"Rough Draft"	4:13
13.	Untitled (no audio)	1:59
14.	"Trainland" (hidden track)	0:57

== Personnel ==
Personnel per booklet.

Yellowcard

- Ryan Key — lead vocals, guitar
- Sean Mackin — violin, backing vocals, string arrangements
- Warren Cooke — bass
- Ben Harper — guitar
- Longineu W. Parsons III — drums

Additional musicians

- Rodney Wirtz — viola
- Alicia Day — cello

Production and design

- Darian Rundall — producer, engineer, mixing
- Mark Chalecki — mastering
- Michael Johansen — design, layout
- Tracy Densford — photography
