= Ocean Avenue (song) =

2003 single by Yellowcard

- Cover used for the US CD single release. Other editions were released using various alternate shots.

Single by Yellowcard

from the album Ocean Avenue
- B-side: "Firewater"
- Released: December 15, 2003
- Recorded: 2003
- Studio: Sunset Sound (Hollywood, California)
- Genre: Pop-punk; emo; alternative rock
- Length: 3:18
- Label: Capitol
- Songwriters: Ryan Key; Ben Harper; Pete Mosely; Longineu W. Parsons III; Sean Mackin
- Producer: Neal Avron

Yellowcard singles chronology
"Way Away" (2003)	"Ocean Avenue" (2003)	"Only One" (2004)

Audio sample
- file; help

Music video
- "Ocean Avenue" on YouTube

"Ocean Avenue" is a song written and recorded by American rock band Yellowcard for their fourth studio album of the same name. It was released as the second single from Ocean Avenue on December 15, 2003, through Capitol Records. "Ocean Avenue" shares writing credits between the band's singer Ryan Key, guitarist Ben Harper, bassist Pete Mosely, drummer Longineu W. Parsons III, and violinist Sean Mackin. It was written about the band's teenage years along the Atlantic Coast. Neal Avron, a veteran punk rock producer, engineered and produced the tune.

Yellowcard began in Florida and moved to California at the onset of the 2000s, signing to Capitol in 2002. "Ocean Avenue" was one of many songs the band wrote for their major-label debut, but primary lyricist Key had difficulty completing its chorus. It was nearly left off the album until Key wrote the song's anthemic refrain. While the song's subject matter appears to be romantic in nature, the song takes root in the band's longing for home: for the group, "Ocean Avenue" represented a farewell to the sunsets and youthful days in Florida, where they lived, rehearsed, and grew up near the beach.

"Ocean Avenue" received heavy radio airplay and is the band's biggest hit, peaking within the top 40 of the Billboard Hot 100. It received praise from music critics, many of whom have called it a classic of the coalescing pop-punk and emo genres. Its music video, directed by Marc Webb and which starred Key in a sci-fi/time travel concept, won the MTV2 Award at the 2004 MTV Video Music Awards. It was certified double platinum by the Recording Industry Association of America (RIAA).

== Background ==
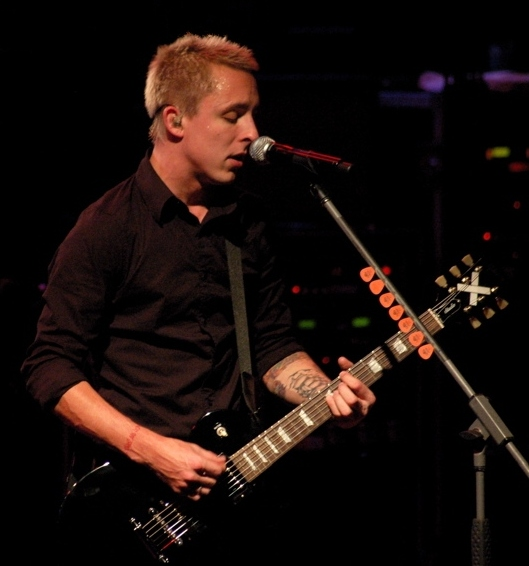
Yellowcard frontman Ryan Key, pictured in 2006

Yellowcard emerged in the early aughts out of Florida's punk rock scene. In 1999, the band moved to California to further their music career, but returned back home. The band added vocalist and guitarist Ryan Key as their primary lyricist, and moved back west, in the L.A. suburb Thousand Oaks, in 2001. The group performed several showcases for Capitol Records before the label signed them in 2002. The band rented a cabin near Lake Arrowhead in the autumn of that year to write and develop new material, and they began pre-production with producer Neal Avron soon afterward at his Swing House space. Capitol booked the band five weeks at Hollywood's famed Sunset Sound studio between February and March 2003 to record the album—but "Ocean Avenue", the namesake of the album Ocean Avenue, was not yet finished.

The song is based around three chords, building towards a big, catchy refrain; this was a conscious choice, to challenge the band with making each section interesting independent of its limited structure. The issue was that the group had yet to develop a completed chorus melody by the time they arrived at Sunset. Key initially had an idea for a chorus that other members of the band felt was too similar to pop star Cyndi Lauper, and he kept writing and re-writing attempting to find a salvageable idea. At the studio, Key occupied its vocal room to further work on the chorus, emerging every so often to the control room to present to Avron. It got to a point where the band were convinced the song would not make the album. He eventually came up with the words "Find-ing out / things would get better," to which Avron responded immediately. "Ocean Avenue" was one of the last songs to come together during the recording process for the band. Upon the tune's completion, the band recognized its potential: "we had a sense that it was a special song, one of the most accessible, massive-sounding pop songs that we'd ever written", Key said. He deemed it the group's most important moment in their career.

== Composition ==
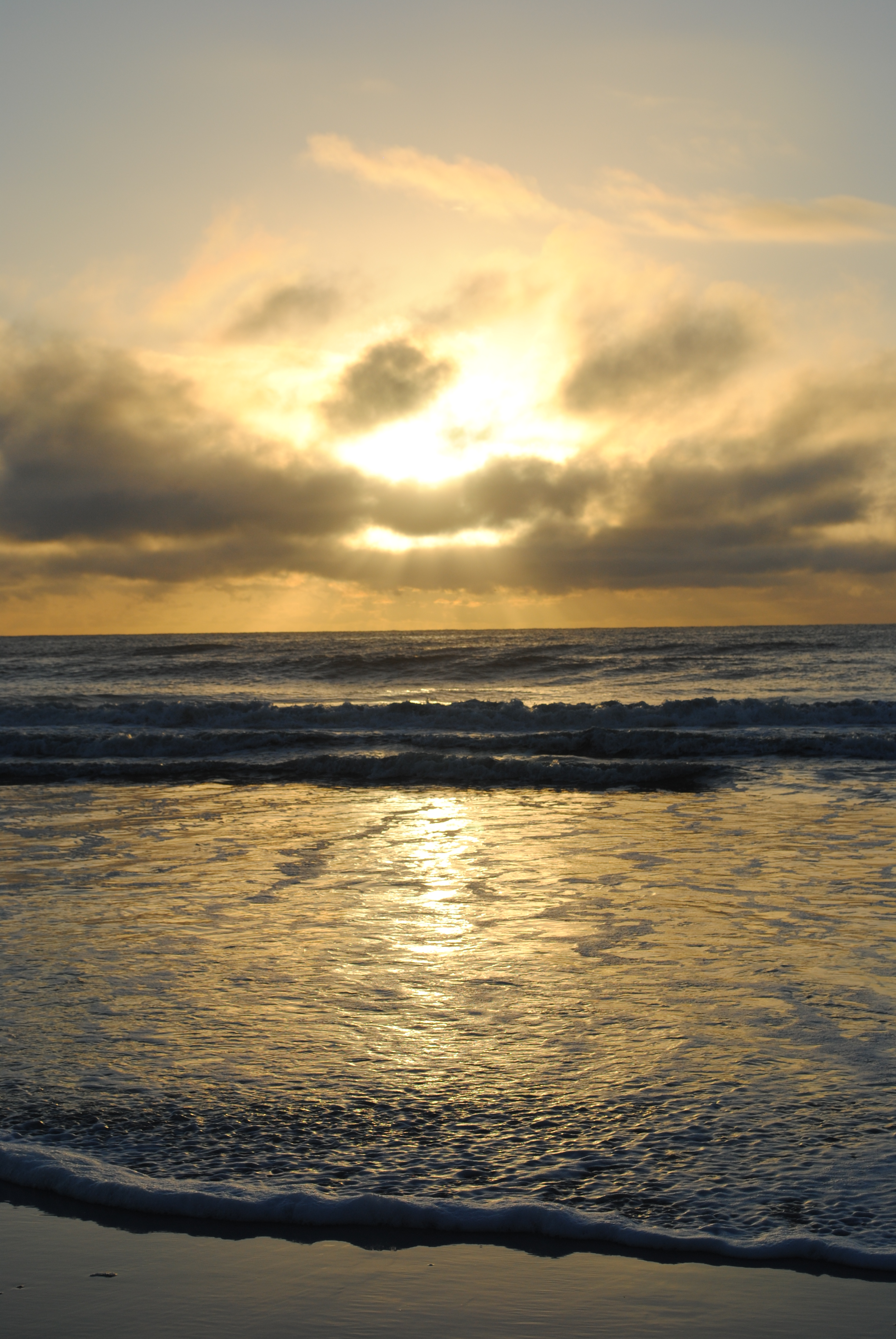
Sunrise in Atlantic Beach

"Ocean Avenue" on the surface appears to be the story of a relationship falling apart, but it attempts to channel a more conceptual feeling. Its lyrics were penned by Key, whose songwriting focus at the time was "translating bigger moments and scenes into songs that sounded more specific." Its opening lyrics date to a journal of Key's, who wrote the song primarily about growing up and leaving his hometown of Jacksonville, Florida. For the band, "Ocean Avenue" represented "saying goodbye to a specific moment in time," those simpler times living on the coast. Harper concurred, noting the song's longing is more geographical than personal: "Instead of talking about a girl, it’s talking about a scene and a feeling that we want to get back to: hanging out and writing, before we moved back to California."

The song opens with the narrator setting the scene: a place off the titular street, "we were both 16 and it felt so right / sleeping all day staying up all night." The lyrics specifically refer to Key's memories of being in high school and meeting friends who lived closer to the beach, where they would be rambunctious late into the evening. The song was not inspired by Florida State Road A1A, sometimes referred to as Ocean Avenue, but rather Ocean Boulevard further south in Atlantic Beach. Key used "avenue" due to the word's rhythm, which he found more aesthetically pleasing than "boulevard". There are many Ocean Avenues dotted from coast to coast of the U.S., in places like California or New Jersey, and Key observed this universal quality aided in the song's broad appeal.

The song transitions to a second verse: "There's a place on the corner of Cherry Street [...] we were both 18 and it felt so right." Key, then 19 in actuality, had briefly moved to California but returned home. He lived in a guest apartment behind a home his parents rented off of Cherry Street in Neptune Beach. Harper, the band's lead guitarist, was living in a home on Ocean Boulevard, where the band would rehearse and party. The song then bursts into a passionate, anthemic chorus: "If I could find you now / things would get better / We could leave this town and run forever." The concept of leaving your hometown is a familiar, "romantic" one across pop music—artists from Katy Perry to Bruce Springsteen have tackled the trope—and especially in pop punk. The song's chorus and bridge were based on a memory of the night Key's family and friends gathered around and said goodbye before the group boarded their van for California for the last time. The song's bridge begins with the central riff repeated, before transitioning to an arpeggiated clean guitar picking pattern over the central three chords. Avron had a hand in developing the bridge, as did the rest of the band, particularly bassist Peter Mosely and violinist Sean Mackin. In the bridge, Key sings "We're looking up at the same night sky / We're both pretending the sun will not rise," over backing vocalizations.

== Music video ==
The song's music video was directed by Marc Webb and was inspired by the 1998 film Run Lola Run. In the high-concept clip, frontman Ryan Key faces his fate in different ways before starting over again using a time loop device, each scenario beginning with Key waking face down on the sidewalk surrounded by broken glass, and ending with his fateful encounter with a 1969 Ford Mustang Mach 1. He skirts through passes and alleyways in Los Angeles, trailed by villains attempting to retrieve a suitcase. Violinist Sean Mackin and drummer Longineu Parsons portray the villains. The video was filmed in Hollywood at the Sixth Street Bridge, a popular filming location for many music videos in the 2000s. The video reached number three on MTV's Total Request Live and received the MTV2 Award at the 2004 MTV Video Music Awards. It also garnered nominations for Best New Artist in a Video and Viewer's Choice.

The briefcase featured in the video is adorned with a lamb symbol, the same symbol featured in the video for Brand New's "Sic Transit Gloria... Glory Fades". Both videos were directed by Webb, who used the lamb as his trademark. The briefcase appeared again in video for Yellowcard's "Rough Landing, Holly", also directed by Webb. The lamb insignia later appeared in the music video for the band's 2023 single "Childhood Eyes". This was the last music video to feature Alex Lewis as the band's bassist.

== Reception ==
"Ocean Avenue" was the band's biggest radio hit. It was first serviced to radio stations in January 2004, but its biggest success came mid-year at the onset of summer in the U.S.. The song has been certified double platinum. "Ocean Avenue" was well-received critically upon its 2004 release. Kelefa Sanneh of The New York Times observed that the tune "follows a simple but appealing formula," while Rashod Ollison at the Baltimore Sun criticized its "Disney-friendly teen angst and derivative punk riffs."

The song has been widely acclaimed as a classic of the early-aughts wave of pop-punk and emo music. Brittany Spanos at Rolling Stone deemed it a "treasured classic [...] a nostalgic, arena-worthy single." Deepa Lakshmin at MTV called it among the best of "2004's crop of radio-friendly, pop-punk gems." Jeremy Gordon at Spin dubbed it the band's greatest moment, and an "eternal" song, while Danielle Chelosky from the same magazine called it "an instant classic [...] an anthem of youth, recklessness and pop-punk." Sam Law from Kerrang! called it one of pop-punk's "most memorable compositions," while Andrew Unterberger at Billboard wrote: "If you were a pop-punk fan in the mid-’00s, you can still recite all eight measures like they were the Pledge of Allegiance." The song's ubiquity, coupled with the band's brief moment in the spotlight, have made some equate the group to a one-hit wonder: "To a lot of people, Yellowcard are 'Ocean Avenue'," Entertainment Weekly reviewer Ariana Bacle wrote in 2016. Variety ranked it as one of the best emo songs of all time in 2022.

=== Accolades ===
Publication	Country	Accolade	Year	Rank
Billboard	United States	The 100 Greatest Choruses of the 21st Century	2017	98
Spin	United States	The 21 Best Pop-Punk Choruses Of The 21st Century	2017	2
Billboard	United States	The 100 Greatest Song Bridges of the 21st Century	2021	34
Spin	United States	The 50 Best Alt-Rock Love Songs	2021	48
Variety	United States	The 25 Best Emo Songs of All Time	2022	—
Cleveland.com	United States	The 100 Greatest Pop Punk Songs of All Time	2022	19

Year	Organization	Award	Result	Ref.
2004	MTV Video Music Awards	MTV2 Award	Won	
2004	MTV Video Music Awards	Best New Artist in a Video	Nominated	
2004	MTV Video Music Awards	Viewer's Choice	Nominated	

== Track listings ==
European and Australian CD single

1. "Ocean Avenue" – 3:18
2. "Way Away" (acoustic version) – 3:52
3. "Firewater" – 3:20

UK 7-inch single

A. "Ocean Avenue" – 3:18
B. "Firewater" – 3:20

== Personnel ==
Personnel are adapted from the liner notes of Ocean Avenue.

Yellowcard

- Ryan Key – lead vocals, guitar
- Sean Mackin – violin, string arrangement, backing vocals
- Ben Harper – lead guitar
- Longineu W. Parsons III – drums

Additional musicians

- Peter Mosely – bass
- Neal Avron – string arrangement

== Charts ==
=== Weekly charts ===
Chart (2004)	Peak position
Australia (ARIA)	61
Canada CHR/Pop Top 30 (Radio & Records)	29
New Zealand (Recorded Music NZ)	34
Scottish Singles Sales (Official Charts)	63
UK Singles (Official Charts)	65
UK Rock & Metal (Official Charts)	4
US Billboard Hot 100	37
US Adult Pop Airplay (Billboard)	27
US Alternative Airplay (Billboard)	21
US Pop Airplay (Billboard)	13

=== Year-end charts ===
Chart (2004)	Position
US Mainstream Top 40 (Billboard)	48
US Modern Rock Tracks (Billboard)	50

== Certifications ==
Region	Certification	Certified units/sales
New Zealand (RMNZ)	Platinum	30,000^{‡}
United Kingdom (BPI)	Silver	200,000^{‡}
United States (RIAA)	2× Platinum	2,000,000^{‡}
^{‡} Sales+streaming figures based on certification alone.

== Release history ==
Region	Date	Format(s)	Label(s)	Ref.
United States	December 15, 2003	Alternative radio	Capitol	
Australia	June 21, 2004	CD	Capitol	
United Kingdom	September 6, 2004	CD	Parlophone	
