= Alyona Alekhina =

Russian-American snowboarder (born 1988)

Alyona Alekhina (Russian: Алёна Андреевна Алёхина; born 19 June 1988) is a Russian-American retired professional snowboarder who is now a singer, songwriter, musician and model. She was a seven-time national Russian snowboarding champion and two-time champion of Europe, but her career ended after a 2013 accident.

== Early life ==
Alyona Alekhina was born in Moscow and grew up with an interest in sport and an active and extreme way of life. She tried gymnastics and skateboarding before settling on snowboarding.

== Athletic career ==
When Alekhina was 17, Roxy became her first sponsor.

She was preparing to participate in the 2014 Winter Olympics in Sochi, Russia. However, in April 2013 Alekhina sustained a severe spinal cord injury while shooting a Quicksilver commercial at the Mammoth Mountain Ski Resort in California. She was paralyzed from the waist down. She had several surgeries and continues rehabilitation therapy.

== Post-2013 career ==
Alekhina is involved in a range of different projects such as music, modeling and charitable work. She is also a brand ambassador for makeup, watch and fashion brands such as Estée Lauder and Bomberg. As a musician, she is known for her singles "Tired", "Coffee Thoughts" and "Time (Lights On The Balcony)".

== Personal life ==
Alekhina met Ryan Key, the front man of the band Yellowcard, in 2012 and the couple became engaged the same year. They married in 2013, a month after Alekhina's accident; the wedding ceremony was held in the hospital intensive care unit. The marriage ended in divorce.
