= Ben Harper (musician, born 1980) =

American musician

- Also known as: Benjammin
- Born: Benjamin Eric Harper; November 14, 1980 (age 45)
- Origin: Jacksonville, Florida, U.S.
- Genres: Alternative rock; pop-punk; punk rock; hardcore punk
- Occupations: Record producer; composer; musician
- Instruments: Vocals; guitar; steel guitar
- Years active: 1997–present
- Labels: Takeover; Capitol; Fueled By Ramen; Lobster; DIY
- Member of: HeyMike!; This Legend
- Formerly of: Yellowcard

Benjamin Eric Harper (born November 14, 1980) is an American rock musician. He is best known for being the founder & former lead guitarist for the American rock band Yellowcard, as well as for the bands Amber Pacific and HeyMike! and This Legend. Harper is founder and CEO of Takeover Records. Alongside these projects, Harper is the owner and founder of Takeover Live, a broadcasting and media production company that specializes in live-streaming bands along with giving artists a platform to share their sound on.

== Music career ==
=== Yellowcard (1997–2005) ===
Harper founded Yellowcard in 1997 with Longineu W. Parsons III, Ben Dobson, Todd Clary, Warren Cooke, and Sean Mackin after meeting at Douglas Anderson School of the Arts. The band released its first album, Midget Tossing, recorded in Jacksonville Beach in 1997. Its second album, Where We Stand, was released in 1999. After Dobson left the band, Harper asked friend Ryan Key to be the band's new lead singer. The band then released the Still Standing EP in early 2000. Shortly after the release of their EP, Todd Clary left the band, Key then filled in as the rhythm guitarist. The members moved to Camarillo, CA, after being signed to Lobster Records. They then begin working on their next album.

The group released their third album, One for the Kids in 2001 and followed up with The Underdog EP in 2002. After the release of The Underdog EP, Warren Cooke left the band for personal reasons. The band later asked close friend Peter Mosely from Inspection 12, to become the band's new bass guitarist. After Yellowcard released The Underdog EP the band signed with Capitol Records, who were looking to sign pop punk bands at the time. Yellowcard then began the recording of their major-label debut album Ocean Avenue in late 2002.

Mosely left during recording of the album due to personal problems. The band then asked Alex Lewis to join as the bass guitarist. Yellowcard released their album Ocean Avenue on July 22, 2003, reached No. 23 on U.S. Billboard 200, the album was a commercial success in the United States with the hit singles Way Away, Ocean Avenue, and Only One.

In early 2004, Lewis left the band after Mosely rejoined as the band's bassist. In 2005, Harper went with the other band members to Los Angeles while Key and Mosely moved to New York City to create new material for their next album. During the following months, tensions arose between the band members. In an interview with MTV News, he said that he was finished with writing the guitar tracks for the album and that he was leaving the band. He was replaced by Ryan Mendez from the band Staring Back.

=== Amber Pacific (2006) ===
After leaving Yellowcard, Harper joined Amber Pacific as their rhythm guitarist, replacing Justin Westcott. Harper left the band before recording their second studio album, Truth in Sincerity in October 2006.

=== HeyMike! (2008–present) ===
In 2008, Harper joined the band as the new lead guitarist alongside Steven Neufeld, Justin Cabrera, and T.J Arriaga. HeyMike! reconstructed its original trio in 2009 when Josh McDonald came back to continue his bass playing duties. Harper remained with the band and the quartet toured in the United States and Japan throughout 2009.[1] In 2010, HeyMike! finished recording their third record and second full-length album titled Pop and Circumstance which is Harper's first recorded appearance since Yellowcard's Lights and Sounds. HeyMike! also toured in Europe and played a limited engagement of shows in the United States. "Pop and Circumstance" was released on April 19, 2011.

=== This Legend (2014–present) ===
In June 2014, Harper formed a new band with former Yellowcard drummer and good friend Longineu W. Parsons III, Chris Castillo (lead vocals and rhythm guitar) and Steven Neufeld (bass guitar) called This Legend. The band played several shows across the U.S.

The band has been on hiatus since that first tour because of the members diverging interests.

== Discography ==
With Yellowcard

- Midget Tossing (1997)
- Where We Stand (1999)
- One for the Kids (2001)
- Ocean Avenue (2003)
- Lights and Sounds (2006)

With HeyMike!

- Pop and Circumstance (2011)

With This Legend

- It's in the Streets (2014)
