= Douglas Anderson School of the Arts =

Location
- 2445 San Diego Road; Jacksonville, Florida 32207; United States; 30°18′01″N 81°38′20″W

Information
- Type: Public magnet high school
- Motto: "Where arts and academics meet in excellence"
- Established: 1922
- School district: Duval County Public Schools
- Principal: Timothy Feagins
- Teaching staff: 53.00 (on an FTE basis)
- Grades: 9–12
- Enrollment: 1,068 (2022–2023)
- Student to teacher ratio: 20.15
- Colors: Black and White
- Mascot: Puffins and Dragons
- Website: dcps.duvalschools.org/anderson

Douglas Anderson School of the Arts, commonly known as DA or DASOTA, is a magnet high school in the San Marco neighborhood of Jacksonville, Florida, United States. The school opened in 1922 during segregation as a primary school for African American students. The school is named after a local civil rights activist, Douglas Anderson. In 1985, the school was renovated into a magnet high school specializing in performing, visual and language arts. A historical marker commemorates its history.

== Awards ==
The school was designated a National Blue Ribbon School of Excellence and received awards from the United States Department of Education, the International Network of Schools for the Advancement of Arts Education, and the National Academy of Recording Arts and Sciences.

In December 2009, the school was designated a Florida Heritage Landmark by the Bureau of Historical Preservation. The ceremony was attended by students and school officials, Anderson's family, and the first graduates of the school from 1959.

== History ==
Opened in 1922 as The South Jacksonville Grammar School for grades 1—9, the school was primarily attended by African American students; the only school in the region during that time. In 1945, the school name changed to Douglas Anderson School. During the 1950s, the school became a high school with the mascot of "Fiery Dragons" and in 1959, the school saw its first graduating class with a commencement speech given by Noah Marsh. During the 1960s, the school closed briefly and reopened in 1968 as a campus for Florida Junior College. In 1970, the school closed briefly again and reopened in 1971 as the Douglas Anderson Seventh Grade Center. In 1985, the school opened as Douglas Anderson School of the Arts.

== Notable alumni ==
- Wes Borland - guitarist
- Daniel Breaker - Broadway and film actor
- Ben Harper - guitarist
- Patrick Heusinger - actor
- William Ryan Key - lead singer of the band Yellowcard
- Billy Merrell - author and poet
- John Otto - drummer
- Longineu W. Parsons III - drummer
- Ana Yi Puig - actress
- Reece Weaver - actress and dancer
