= Lights and Sounds =

Studio album by Yellowcard
- Released: January 24, 2006
- Recorded: May–June 2005
- Studios: Sunset Sound, Los Angeles, California
- Genres: Alternative rock; pop-punk; pop rock
- Length: 52:42
- Label: Capitol
- Producer: Neal Avron

Yellowcard chronology
Ocean Avenue (2003)	Lights and Sounds (2006)	Paper Walls (2007)

Singles from Light and Sound
- 1. "Lights and Sounds" Released: November 15, 2005; 2. "Rough Landing, Holly" Released: May 6, 2006

Lights and Sounds is the fifth studio album by American rock band Yellowcard, released on January 24, 2006, in the United States through Capitol Records. Lights and Sounds is Yellowcard's first concept album, which was inspired to reflect what the band was feeling at the time of production and how they have matured in the process. Lights and Sounds also departs from the sounds on Yellowcard's previous album, Ocean Avenue (2003), scaling back much of the band's pop-punk sound in favor of a sound more generally characteristic of alternative rock.

Lights and Sounds debuted to mixed reviews from contemporary music critics, receiving criticism as the album fell short from the standard set by its predecessor, Ocean Avenue. Upon the album's release, it charted at number five on Billboard's 200 and Top Internet Albums' charts, making it the band's highest charting album to date. The album accumulated sales of just over 315,000 copies, which failed to match the 2 million sales of their previous album. Yellowcard went on to explain that the disappointment of the sales were due to their going "a bit too far" with the expectations they had thought the album would exceed. Lights and Sounds was certified Gold by the Recording Industry Association of America (RIAA).

The album yielded two singles, "Lights and Sounds" and "Rough Landing, Holly". While the band was promoting the album, lead guitarist Ben Harper parted ways with the band. Following Harper's departure, the band revealed that they had entered their "highest and lowest" points because of Harper's departure from the band. To accommodate the album's promotion, Yellowcard replaced Harper with guitarist Ryan Mendez.

== Background and production ==
After almost two years of touring in support of their 2003 album, Ocean Avenue, Yellowcard took a few months off. In December 2004, vocalist Ryan Key and bassist Peter Mosely moved to New York City to write songs for their upcoming album, while the rest of the band remained in Los Angeles.

As Key and Mosely stayed in New York, they experienced a delayed start to the album's songwriting process. Key explained that they were writing "weird, obscure, not-too-mellow" tracks and working on notebooks that he had compiled while the band was touring. He was able to write for a couple of hours and collect over "15-20 ideas" for the band, so once they all got together, they could start collaborating on the record. Mosely added that the reason it took them so long was because they were "scared to death" with the writing but that once the writing had begun, the process was easier on them. It was also during this time that Key and Mosely began to turn their apartment into a studio, adding a drum kit, guitar amps, and even including a piano. While Key and Mosely began the development of the songs, the rest of the members would occasionally fly to New York to check on the progress.

In April 2005, the band met in Los Angeles and began working at the Sunset Sound studios. The following month in an interview with MTV News, lead guitarist Ben Harper revealed that the writing process was finished. In addition, Harper commented that the band recorded 19 songs for the album, 13 of which made the final cut. Sessions were held at Sunset Sound in May and June 2005, with producer Neal Avron. Recording was handled by Bradley Cook and Avron, with assistance from Bill Mims and Pro Tools engineer Travis Huff. Tom Lord-Alge mixed the recordings, with assistance from Femio Hernández, at South Beach Studios in Miami, Florida. Ted Jensen mastered the album at Sterling Sound in New York City.

== Music ==
=== Musical style ===
With Lights and Sounds, Yellowcard broke away from their original pop-punk sound to a more alternative rock album, though some critics described it as pop-punk anyway. The album is somewhat of a concept album, made to reflect what Yellowcard was feeling at the time of production. Ryan Key, in discussion of this, said that Ocean Avenue was about "finding your place in the world" and explained that Lights and Sounds was about "realizing that you've gotten lost". The band has cited Radiohead's Kid A (2000) and Guns N' Roses' 1991 albums Use Your Illusion I and Use Your Illusion II as major influences for the album. Yellowcard also credit Aphex Twin, Mouse on Mars and Explosions in the Sky for inspiration, regarding the music sound in the album.

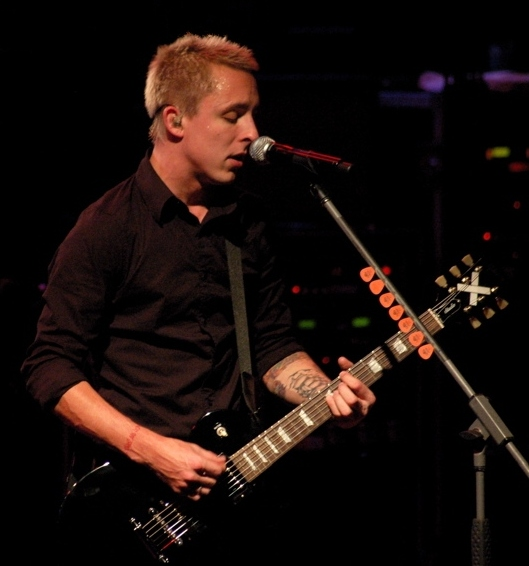
Ryan Key performing in support of the release of Lights and Sounds in September 2006

"Lights and Sounds"
A sample of the album's title track, which shows Lights and Sounds' darker and harder musical style when compared to Ocean Avenue.

In an interview in August 2005, Key explained that the album was a "definite departure" and "more political" than what Ocean Avenue had contained. In discussion of the album, Key said that the band had matured and that the music in Lights and Sounds would be different from their previous album. However, Key added, "we have to be careful, we have to try and write songs [in the style of the ones] we wrote before. We have to make a conscious effort not to think about the fact that we went from being a nothing band... to having a bunch of hit singles in like, one year." Printz Board of The Black Eyed Peas collaborated with Yellowcard on the song "Two Weeks from Twenty", where he played a trumpet solo. The song "How I Go" features a duet with the Chicks' lead vocalist Natalie Maines and a twenty-five piece orchestra conducted by violinist Sean Mackin.

Key was a fan of the Chicks and had thought of collaborating with Maines on Ocean Avenue for the song "View from Heaven", but the Chicks' record label had flatly refused as Yellowcard had not yet found mainstream recognition. As Yellowcard were entering the studio to record Lights and Sounds, the band learned from Avron that the Chicks were coincidentally next door recording what would become Taking the Long Way (2006) with Rick Rubin. Once the rest of the song was completed, Key approached Maines and asked her to sing on the song, providing her with a demo; Maines liked it so much that she wrote her own parts to the song.

=== Lyrical content ===
Lights and Sounds primarily focuses on the band coping with the success they were experiencing when writing songs for the album. Key said that one of the common themes written in the album was the band's hatred of living in Los Angeles. Key said that the songs have "lost that adolescent bounciness -- they've come into adulthood a bit". In an interview with Rolling Stone magazine, Key revealed that during the time he and Mosely spent in New York, he said it "brought out some darker places" in them and that it was "not in a 'now I'm going to start wearing eyeliner' kind of way, but emotionally darker." In addition, many of the song's themes deal with Key's battle with drugs and alcohol.

"Holly became this person on the record who appears in a lot of the songs, and at times you love her and at times you hate her. At times she's good to you and sometimes she's bad."

— Ryan Key in discussion of the Holly Wood character

While making the album, Yellowcard also developed a character, Holly Wood, who serves as a narrator and protagonist for the album's storyline and is featured in the songs "Rough Landing, Holly" and "Holly Wood Died". The band explained the meaning of the title track, which they said is based on a "whirlwind rocker about the pressures on the band members" and how they have changed as they have aged after the release of Ocean Avenue. Key also commented that when he was preoccupied with making the album, there were distractions while in the process; he simply referred to the distractions as "lights and sounds", which ultimately resulted in the band naming the album just that. He also says that the main reason behind that was how it affected the band during that particular time.

During discussion of the track listing in Lights and Sounds, Yellowcard revealed that "Two Weeks from Twenty" stretched the "limits" for them and explained that it was a "jazz-lounge anti-war song". The band also explained that the song is a narrative of a young soldier named Jimmy, from New Jersey, who is killed in the Iraq war. Other songs such as "Down on My Head", "City of Devils", and "Holly Wood Died", spoke about bitterness and disillusionment. "How I Go" is based on both lament of a father over the life that has flowed past him and the 2003 film Big Fish. Another song, "Words, Hands, Hearts", is written about the events that occurred during the September 11 attacks.

== Release and promotion ==
"We've simply grown apart, personally and creatively, which can happen in any relationship. This change is hard for all of us, but Ben will always be our brother."

— Violinist Sean Mackin on Ben Harper leaving Yellowcard

In August 2005, Yellowcard announced the songs, "Lights and Sounds", "Sure Thing Falling" and "Two Weeks from Twenty", that would be featured in the album. In September 2005, the band played a few festivals in Japan, before embarking on a tour of Canada with Rufio and Moneen. That same month, their next album was announced for release in four months' time. "Lights and Sounds" debuted as part of the soundtrack to Burnout Revenge, before made available for streaming through the band's website on September 14, 2005. Later in September, the band announced the album's title and revealed that the title track, "Lights and Sounds", was confirmed to be the first single from the album, with a video shot in Van Nuys, California and a release date of November 15.

Between October and December 2005, Yellowcard went on a cross-country US tour with Acceptance and the Pink Spiders. In November 2005, it was announced that guitarist Ben Harper had parted ways with the band. Key explained that the band went through "a lot of the highest and lowest points" and that making an album "would be on the highest list, and losing a member would be on the lowest." He added, "It's really been a long journey together, you know, so obviously, parting ways with Ben was a really unpleasant experience. It was either go on without him, or don't go on at all. And, at the core, we decided that we had something too great to let go of, and that we had to kind of make a last resort and move on without him." Harper was replaced by Ryan Mendez of Staring Back, which broke up upon Mendez leaving. (Note: Harper would later join Amber Pacific as their second guitarist.)

The music video for the title track was featured on a Verizon Wireless Vcast commercial around the time of the album's release. Lights and Sounds was released on January 24, 2006 through major label Capitol Records. In January and February the band went on a tour of the US. On March 21, 2006, the music video for "Rough Landing, Holly" was posted online. In April and May, the band embarked on the Virgin College Mega Tour alongside Mae, Over It, and Strike Fire Fall. Following this, they appeared at the HFStival. In June, the band went on a summer tour alongside Matchbook Romance and Hedley. During this, a video for "Sure Thing Falling" was posted on the band's Myspace profile. They then appeared at the San Diego Street Scene festival in August 2006 and played a few shows in Brazil. In September 2006, the band went on a headlining tour of the US with support from Anberlin and Reeve Oliver, and appeared at the X96 Big Ass Show and Bamboozle Left festivals.

== Critical reception ==
Professional ratings
Aggregate scores
Source	Rating
Metacritic	(59/100)
Review scores
Source	Rating
AbsolutePunk	(51%)
AllMusic	3.5/5 stars
Drowned in Sound	2/10 stars
Entertainment Weekly	(B+)
Melodic	3/5 stars
Now	2/5 stars
PopMatters	3/10 stars
Rolling Stone	3.5/5 stars
Sputnikmusic	3.5/5 stars

The reviews for Lights and Sounds were mostly mixed upon release, particularly from mainstream media. Some critics stated that the album had fallen well short of the standards of Ocean Avenue, the album's predecessor. Kelefa Sanneh of the New York Times, in review of the album, wrote: "To listeners on either side of rock's latest generational divide, there's a big difference — the difference of a decade — between being a loser and being a twerp... Lights and Sounds is Yellowcard's attempt to split that difference." Sanneh stated that the anti-war song "Two Weeks from Twenty" "sounds suspiciously like Green Day; the lyrics echo the plot of the video for Green Day's 'Wake Me Up When September Ends'" but concluded that Yellowcard is still "pretty good" at "writing sweeping, upbeat punk-rock love songs". Mike Schiller of PopMatters, somewhat displeased with the album, wrote that the album does not "make up for the overabundance of flaccid mediocrity on display throughout most of the album... Lights and Sounds may be Yellowcard’s attempt at a big, serious album, but the band doesn’t sound even remotely ready." Nick Cowen from Drowned in Sound wrote: "Those who register for Pop-Punk 101 will receive Yellowcard’s Lights And Sounds as their first set-work; the Jacksonville quintet's new album would be the perfect teaching aid, as it's technically proficient while being boring and forgettable enough not to inspire the temptation to plagiarise." Cowen concluded that the album "is a substandard, second-tier album with some strings thrown in for good measure. It's really not worth the money in your wallet – even if that wallet is attached to a very long chain." Now magazine claimed that the band "may be in the right place, it's clear they're simply incapable of realizing this clumsy faux magnum opus."

Despite the mixed reaction, many critics were fond of the album. Rolling Stone's music critic Jenny Eliscu wrote that the album "has made what ends up being one of the best straight-up pop-rock albums of 2006". Elicsu also complimented the band, writing: "Like the Goo Goo Dolls ... Yellowcard have rightfully recognized the transcendent value of a big, fist-pumping anthem coated with a light dose of romantic schmaltz." Alternative Press gave the album a perfect rating, saying, "It may be one of the least 'punk' albums a pop-punk band will make this year--but it's probably one of the best, too." Sputnikmusic gave the album 3.5 out of five stars, writing: "It's pop-punk, and fairly unambitious stuff at that ... What keeps this record on its feet is the lyricism, the production and the simplicity of it all." Heather Phares of AllMusic wrote: "On Lights and Sounds, Yellowcard sounds light years away from its One for the Kids/Where We Stand days. Granted, the band still trades in the immediate melodies and heart-on-sleeve lyrics that they've used since the beginning, but major-label success suits them well." Phares added that the band "ends up sounding self-assured instead of compromised in its big-budget surroundings." Billboard magazine gave the album 8 out of 10 stars and claimed that Yellowcard made a "strong effort that trades sunny-sounding rockers and breakup songs for weightier concerns of war and family, 'Lights' conveys that maturity without seeming strained." Dan McClanahan of Iowa State Daily wrote: "This disc will likely change people's opinion of Yellowcard. Much more angst and a drastically matured sound make for a pleasant surprise." McClanahan revealed that he had not been looking forward to listening to the album but that once he heard it, he knew it embraced the band's "strengths" and that they "greatly expanded the subject matter of its songs."

== Commercial performance ==
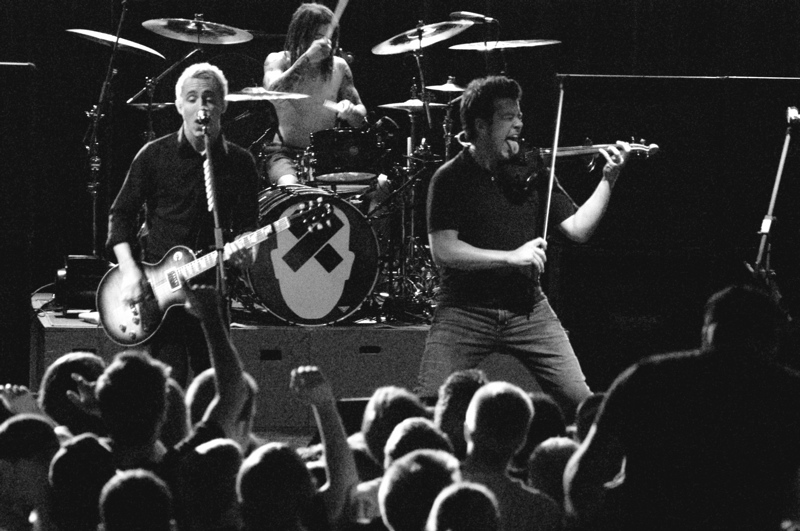
Yellowcard performing songs from Lights and Sounds on tour

Lights and Sounds debuted at number five on the Billboard 200 and Top Internet Albums' charts and sold over 95,000 copies in its first week of release. Since June 2006, Lights and Sounds has sold over 315,000 copies in the United States. The album did not exceed the expectations of Ocean Avenue, which approached 2 million in record sales. Internationally, Lights and Sounds peaked at number four on the Canadian Top Album Chart, making it Yellowcard's highest debut in Canada. It also debuted at number six in the Australian chart, in which it spent six weeks, before retiring in the number 49 position. In the New Zealand chart it peaked in the number 11 position. Lights and Sounds charted on the number 59 spot in the United Kingdom and spent one week on the chart. In the United States, the album was certified gold by the RIAA on March 15, 2006, indicating shipment of 500,000.

When asked about the disappointment of sales that Lights and Sounds received, Sean Mackin said:

I think that the band went on ... maybe not a tangent, but we had a goal in mind, and at the end of the recording process, we were so proud of how artistic we were. And I think we showed too much. I think maybe we were a little too jaded and a little too dark, and I think that the lack of hope and faith that we put on this record made us a little less sparkly and light to people. But I think that it's all part of our evolution. We all went a bit too far.

Mackin also insisted that the band did not see the album as a mistake but as more of a "learning experience" for their next project.

Two singles were released from Lights and Sounds. The first, "Lights and Sounds", was released on November 25, 2005. The song peaked at number four on Billboard's Hot Modern Rock Tracks chart. The song also appeared on the Hot Digital Songs chart on the number 26 position. It also charted in Billboard's Hot 100 and Pop 100, respectively. The second single, "Rough Landing, Holly", was released on May 6, 2006, reached 27 on Billboard's Hot Modern Rock Tracks, and peaked at number 49 on the Australian Recording Industry Association (ARIA) chart.

== Track listing ==
All lyrics by Ryan Key, except where noted. All music by Key, Sean Mackin, Ryan Mendez, Pete Mosely, and Longineu W. Parsons III, except where noted.

Lights and Sounds
No.	Title	Lyrics	Music	Length
1.	"Three Flights Up" (Instrumental)		Key; Mackin; Mosely	1:23
2.	"Lights and Sounds"			3:28
3.	"Down on My Head"		Key; Mosely	3:32
4.	"Sure Thing Falling"			3:42
5.	"City of Devils"			4:23
6.	"Rough Landing, Holly"			3:33
7.	"Two Weeks from Twenty"	Key; Mosely	Key; Mosely	4:18
8.	"Waiting Game"			4:15
9.	"Martin Sheen or JFK"			3:47
10.	"Space Travel"		Key; Mosely	3:47
11.	"Grey"			3:00
12.	"Words, Hands, Hearts"			4:24
13.	"How I Go" (featuring Natalie Maines)		Key; Mosely	4:32
14.	"Holly Wood Died"			4:39
Total length:				52:43

Japanese and iTunes bonus track
No.	Title	Length
15.	"Three Flights Down"	4:42

Wal-Mart bonus track
No.	Title	Length
15.	"Down on My Head (Acoustic)"	3:25

Special limited edition bonus tracks
No.	Title	Length
15.	"Three Flights Down"	4:42
16.	"Gifts and Curses"	5:05

Special limited edition bonus DVD
No.	Title	Length
1.	"Making of the album"
2.	"Making of Lights and Sounds music video"
3.	"Lights and Sounds" (Music video)
4.	"Lights and Sounds" (Live)
5.	"Rough Landing, Holly" (Live (Note: The live recording of "Rough Landing, Holly" was released digitally as an audio track through iTunes and Amazon.))

== Personnel ==
Personnel per booklet.

Yellowcard

- Ryan Key – lead vocals, guitars
- Sean Mackin – violin, background vocals, string arranger
- Ben Harper – guitars (tracks 3–5, 8, 10–12 and 14), dobro (track 5)
- Peter Mosely – bass, keyboards, background vocals, guitars, string arrangement (track 8)
- Longineu W. Parsons III – drums

Production and design

- Neal Avron – producer, recording
- Bradley Cook – recording
- Bill Mims – assistant
- Travis Huff – Pro Tools engineer
- Tom Lord-Alge – mixing
- Femio Hernández – mix assistant
- Ted Jensen – mastering
- Chris Bilheimer – art direction, photography
- Max Vadukul – band photograph

Additional musicians

- Printz Board – trumpet (track 7)
- Natalie Maines – additional vocals (track 13)
- Christine Choi – string arrangement (track 13)
- Rodney Wirtz – string arrangement (track 13)
- Mark Robertson – violin
- Liane Mautner – violin
- Tritia Lee – violin
- Sam Fischer – violin
- Michaela Keating – violin
- Alyssa Park – violin
- Grace Oh – violin
- Paul Henning – violin
- Rodney Wirtz – viola
- Jerome Gordon – viola
- Brett Banducci – viola
- Christine Choi – cello
- Victor Lawrence – cello
- Paul Wiancko – cello
- Nick France – bass
- Cathy Cho – flute
- Amy Tatum – flute
- Don Foster – clarinet
- Teag Reves – horns
- Danielle Ondarza – horns
- Dave Costello – trumpet
- Nick Stoup – percussion

== Charts ==
Album

Chart performance for Lights and Sound
Chart (2006)	Peak position
Australian Albums (ARIA)	6
Austrian Albums (Ö3 Austria)	67
Canadian Albums (Billboard)	4
Italian Albums (FIMI)	84
New Zealand Albums (RMNZ)	11
Scottish Albums (Official Charts)	77
Swiss Albums (Schweizer Hitparade)	73
UK Albums (Official Charts)	59
UK Rock & Metal Albums (Official Charts)	1
US Billboard 200	5

Singles

Chart performance for singles from Lights and Sound
Title	Year	Chart	Position
"Lights and Sounds"	2005	US Billboard Hot 100	50
"Lights and Sounds"	2005	US Hot Modern Rock Tracks	4
"Lights and Sounds"	2005	UK Singles Charts	56
"Lights and Sounds"	2005	New Zealand Singles Chart	23
"Lights and Sounds"	2005	Australian Singles Chart	24
"Rough Landing, Holly"	2006	US Hot Modern Rock Tracks	27
"Rough Landing, Holly"	2006	Australian Singles Chart	49

== Certifications ==
Certifications for Lights and Sound
Country	Certification	Sales
Canada	Gold	50,000
United States	Gold	500,000

== Notes and references ==
Footnotes

Citations
