= Ocean Avenue (album) =

Studio album by Yellowcard
- Released: July 22, 2003
- Recorded: February–March 2003
- Studios: Sunset Sound, Hollywood, California
- Genres: Pop-punk; punk rock; alternative rock
- Length: 47:26
- Label: Capitol
- Producer: Neal Avron

Yellowcard chronology
The Underdog EP (2002)	Ocean Avenue (2003)	Lights and Sounds (2006)

Singles from Ocean Avenue
- 1. "Way Away" Released: June 15, 2003; 2. "Ocean Avenue" Released: December 16, 2003; 3. "Only One" Released: January 10, 2004; 4. "Breathing" Released: May 17, 2004

Ocean Avenue is the fourth studio album and major label debut by American rock band Yellowcard. It was released on July 22, 2003, through Capitol Records. After touring to promote their third album One for the Kids in 2001, the band signed to the label in early 2002. Following this, bassist Warren Cooke left the band in mid-2002, and was replaced by Inspection 12 guitarist Peter Mosely. In February and March 2003, the band recorded at Sunset Sound in Hollywood, California, with Neal Avron. Ocean Avenue is a pop-punk and punk rock album, which was compared to Blink-182 and Simple Plan.

Before Yellowcard's promotional tour of Ocean Avenue, Mosely was replaced by Alex Lewis. Yellowcard appeared on the Warped Tour, during which "Way Away" was released as the album's lead single on July 22, 2003. The band went on a club tour of the United States, before going on tour with Less Than Jake and Fall Out Boy. "Ocean Avenue" was released as the second single on December 16, 2003. Lewis departed from the band and was replaced by Mosely before a co-headlining tour with Something Corporate and a stint in Europe. "Only One" was released as the third and final single in June 2004; they toured Europe, Australia, and Japan. After this, they had a US tour.

Ocean Avenue received mostly positive reviews from music critics, some of whom commented on Sean Mackin's violin playing and songwriting quality. The album peaked at number 23 on the US Billboard 200, as well as number 8 in New Zealand, and number 149 in the UK. The album was certified platinum in the US by the RIAA, gold in both Canada by Music Canada and New Zealand by RMNZ, and silver in the UK by the BPI. "Way Away" and "Only One" appeared high on the US Alternative Airplay chart; "Ocean Avenue" peaked at number 37 on the US Hot 100, and within the top 100 in Scotland and the UK alongside "Way Away". "Ocean Avenue" was certified double platinum by the RIAA, platinum by RMNZ, and silver by the BPI. "Only One" was certified gold in the US.

In the years following its release, the album has received retrospective acclaim and is widely viewed as one of the greatest pop-punk albums of all time.

== Background and production ==
In April 2001, Yellowcard released their third studio album One for the Kids through Lobster Records. It was promoted with a tour of the southern United States with Inspection 12, and a two-week tour of the US West Coast with Bordem. Yellowcard had moved from Florida to California, with the hopes of someone from a label would be attached to them. Harper said their manager was adamant about finding them a different label, and made pitches to a number of labels. By April 2002, it was reported that the band had signed to Capitol Records, one of a few major labels who showed interest. Harper said the interest came from a friend of their booking agent, who in turn was friends with an A&R representative at Capitol. This person had seen the band live at six-to-seven of their gigs and won over others at the label. The band subsequently met with Capitol and two other labels, ultimately picking Capitol. Harper explained that Capitol were "just the coolest people. Their president, their vibe, and everything - they have a big catalogue" of acts such as the Beatles, Megadeth, and Pink Floyd. Frontman Ryan Key also reasoned that listeners were unable to purchase One for the Kids in stores due to a lack of distribution and wanted a label that could rectify that.

In June and July 2002, the band appeared on Warped Tour, which coincided with the release of the band's second EP The Underdog EP on July 2, through Fueled by Ramen. Capitol Records had licensed the EP to Fueled by Ramen as not to lose the band punk credibility. Two days after its release, bassist Warren Cooke left the band, citing personal reasons; violinist Sean Mackin said there was in-fighting between them up to eight months before this occurred. Cooke spot was temporarily filled by members of other acts on the tour, Home Grown and the Starting Line. On July 21, 2002, Inspection 12 guitarist Peter Mosely joined Yellowcard as their bassist. In October and November 2002, the band supported No Use for a Name on their headlining US tour, and played a few shows with the Starting Line and Park. In February 2003, Yellowcard played a handful of West Coast shows with Park and Stole Your Woman.

Between signing to Capitol and recording, Yellowcard spent a period of time writing new material in several studios. Key would come up with a melody line and a chord progression, which he would then show to the rest of the band, who build upon it from this bare form. Key and drummer Longineu W. Parsons III wrote together and would often jam material. They spent around four months writing material, before going into pre-production. The band had one song, "Boxing Me", that their A&R person felt sounded like a single, but the members considered the track "too poppy" and dropped it. Sessions for Ocean Avenue were held at Sunset Sound in Hollywood, California, in February and March 2003. Neal Avron produced and recorded the album with assistance from engineers Ryan Castle and Travis Huff. Harper knew of Avron through his work with Everclear, New Found Glory, and the Wallflowers. He praised Avron for helping to achieve the "right kind of guitar tone, or master the violin, or help out with drum" sounds. Tom Lord-Alge mixed the recordings at South Beach Studios in Miami Beach, Florida, with assistance from Femio Hernandez, before the album was mastered by Ted Jensen at Sterling Sound in New York City.

Mosely played bass on every track, except for "Only One", which was done by Key. Mosely also played piano on "Empty Apartment" and "Only One", and added vocals. Christine Choi and Rodney Wirtz played cello and viola, respectively, on "Way Away", "Breathing", "Empty Apartment", "Only One", and "Believe"; Mackin and Avron wrote the string arrangement.

== Composition and lyrics ==
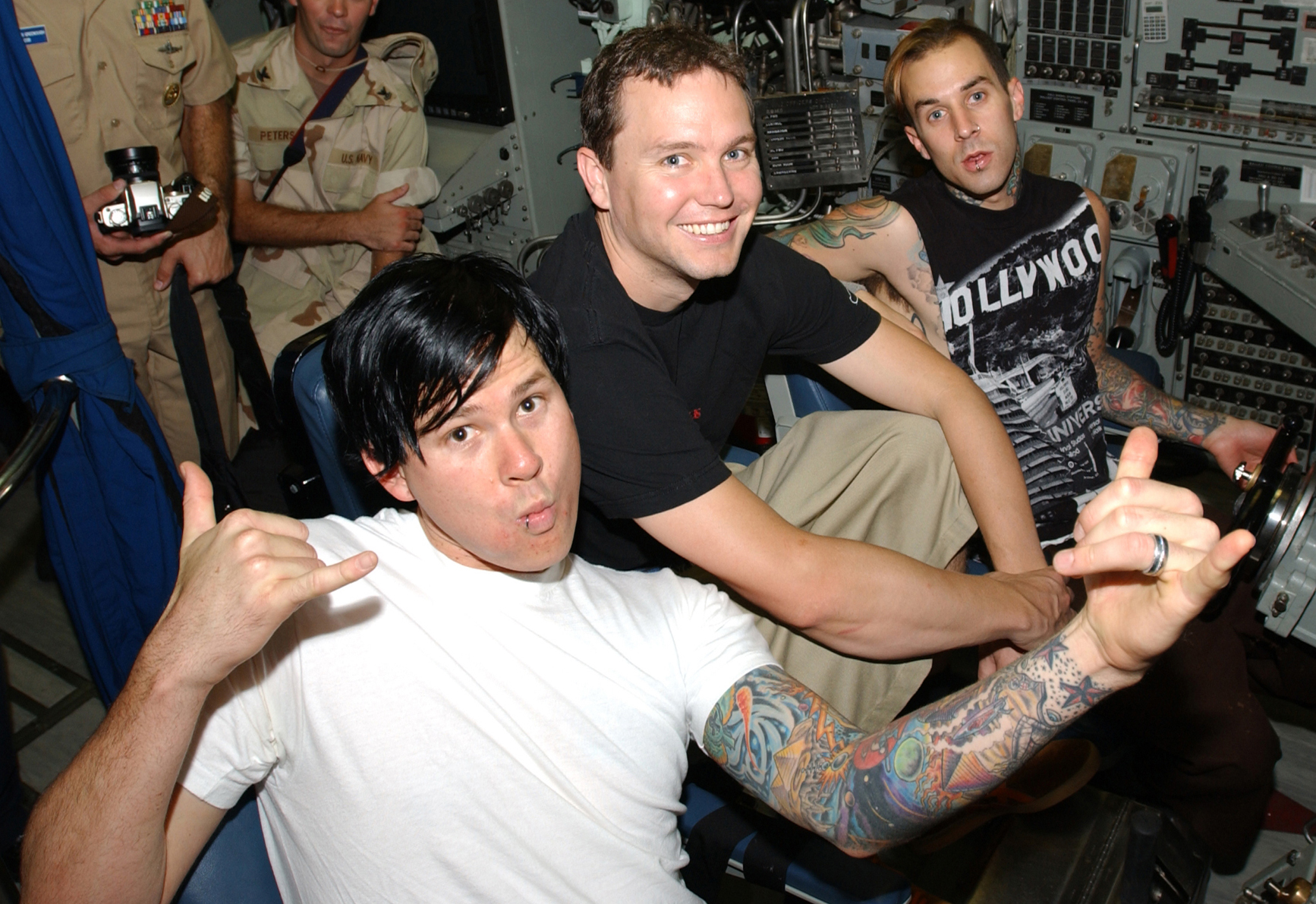
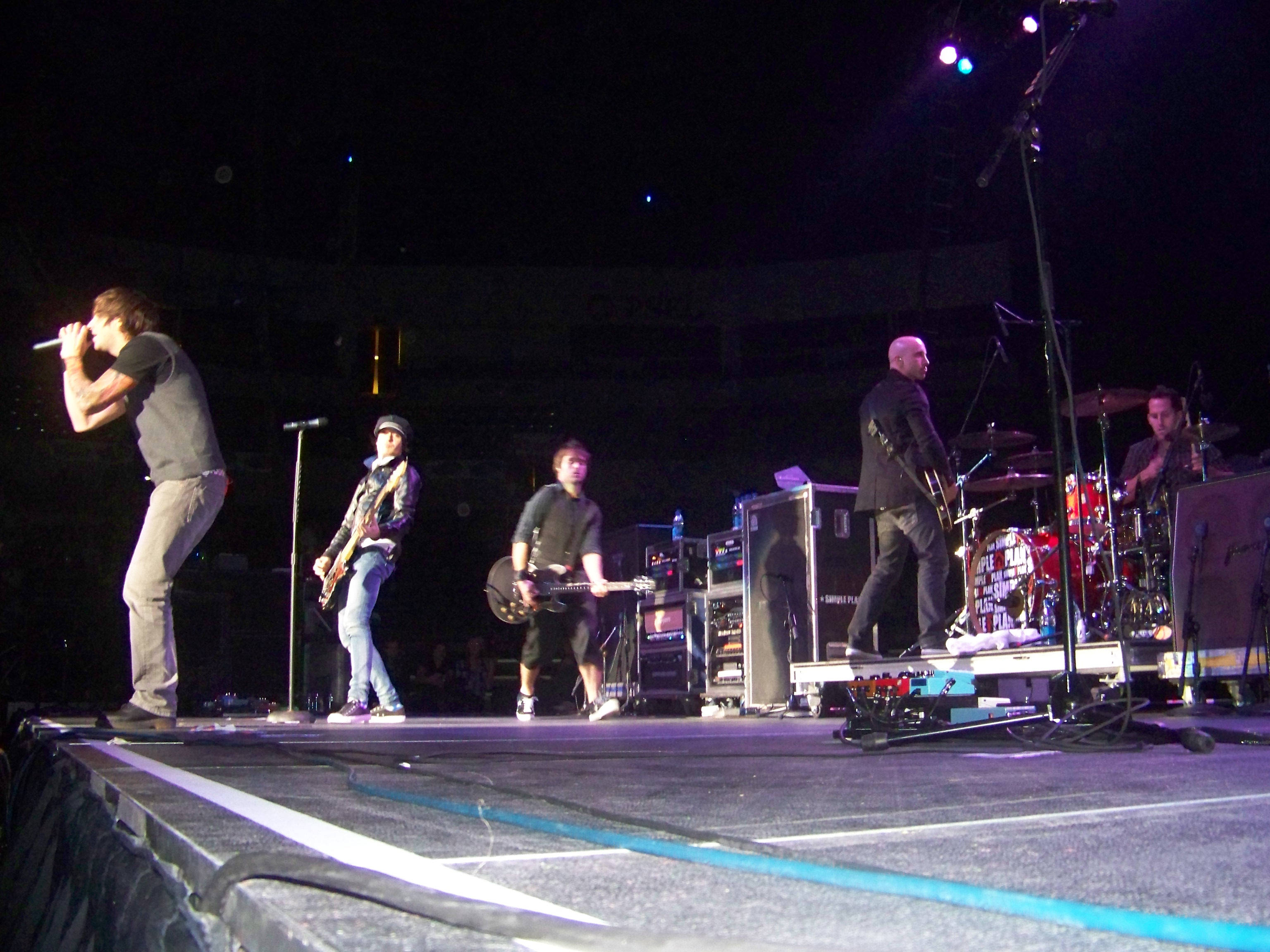
Ocean Avenue has been compared to the work of Blink-182 (left, pictured in 2003) and Simple Plan (right, pictured in 2007)

The sound of Ocean Avenue has been categorized musically as pop-punk and punk rock and has drawn comparisons to Blink-182 and Simple Plan. Additionally, Alternative Press categorized musically as umbrella term scene music. The band experimented with country and folk-stylized rock in songs like "Empty Apartment", "View from Heaven", and "One Year, Six Months". When asked about a metal influence throughout the album, Key attributed this to Parsons, who was a metalhead.

The album's title refers to a street in the band's hometown of Jacksonville, Florida, where they had they spent some of their childhood. The opening track "Way Away" is about a person leaving their home and finding their own way in life. Key said he had had re-written the verse music, melody and lyrics 30 minutes prior to a show. "Breathing" was a reaction to the end of Key's first post-high school relationship. He had written the guitar riff to it in a dressing room at the Glass House venue in Pomona, California while on a tour. "Ocean Avenue" is anchored around a distorted staccato punk rock guitar riff; in the song's lyrics, Key uses the person he is singing to as a metaphor for Jacksonville. The song was inspired by Ocean Boulevard, a road in Jacksonville. Key said the sign on that road lacked the word boulevard, only being named as such on a map. As he was trying to find a rhyme for the lyrics, he used the word avenue instead. It was nearly left off the album as Key was unable to come up with a chorus that he was satisfied with, until settling on the lyric "Finding out things would get better". Discussing "Empty Apartment", he mentioned the various line-up changes the band had gone through, and "sometimes you're faced with a decision of: Do you quit? Do we break up and just call it? Or do we move on without this person?" In "Life of a Salesman", Key talks about how he will act as a father by following his own father's example. He said his relationship with his father was strained during the making of the album, and used the song as a way to remind him of his importance.

"Only One" was written partway through the recording sessions, and Key said the lyrics were influenced by "a weird breakup". He explained it was "one of those where I felt like I had to do it, even though she didn't do anything wrong". The music came about from Key using different amplifiers to achieve a different sound, utilizing a tremolo effect played through a Fender Twin amp. "Miles Apart" was written in the basement of The Nile venue in Phoenix, Arizona; Key thought the riff progression was very simplistic that he referred to it as "my first guitar riff dot com". "Twentythree" is about growing up, while the country-influenced song "View from Heaven", with additional vocals from Alieka Wijnveldt, discusses the death of a girlfriend. Key explained that it was about a friend of his who had died of juvenile diabetes at age 18. "Inside Out" is a mid-tempo rock track that is followed by "Believe", a homage to emergency service members who died in the September 11 attacks. In the context of the latter song, Key said that early on in their career, they would attract a fanbase from the tri-state area. The penultimate track, "One Year, Six Months", is an acoustic ballad; the band said they wanted something with a heavy amount of reverb as Sunset Sound had one of the earliest-built reverb chambers. The album ends with "Back Home", which is about the things a person leaves behind in "Way Away". Key had the clean intro and outro guitar riff for a period of time until it ended up in "Back Home".

== Release ==
In March 2003, Mosely left Yellowcard citing personal reasons and was replaced by Alex Lewis, who was best friends with Harper and Mackin. Following this, they went on tour with the Ataris; during the last night of the trek, Key had injured his jaw from messing around with Mackin. After seeing a doctor, Key stayed with his parents in Jacksonville and had surgery. The rest of the band went on tour with Lagwagon while Peter Munters from Over It temporarily filled in for Key. On May 4, 2003, Ocean Avenue was announced for release in two months' time. Later that month, the band went on a brief tour of Japan, followed by headlining shows in California throughout June 2003. They took a week-long break before starting press and in-store in events in the lead up to the album's release. Between mid-July and early August 2003, the group appeared on the Warped Tour, and then toured with Don't Look Down. Ocean Avenue was eventually released on July 22, 2003, through Capitol Records after it was originally scheduled to be released on July 8. The artwork features a blurry photo of a high school girl in front of a setting sun in California. The model is Brittany Nash, who was photographed by Sasha Eisenman. The album was released as an enhanced CD in some countries, which included a video entitled "The Making of Ocean Avenue" and a music video for The Underdog EP track "Powder". The Japanese edition included "Firewater", "Hey Mike", and the acoustic versions of "Way Away" and "Avondale" as bonus tracks; "Way Away" was released on radio the same day. The CD version included "Hey Mike" and an acoustic version of "Avondale". Key felt it was a "little more tough, a little more edgy" choice as the album's first single, wanting to avoid being seen as a poppy band.

After Yellowcard finished performing on the Warped Tour in August, it went on a club tour in the US that was followed by a few radio show appearances. The music video for "Way Away" premiered on The O.C. on September 2, 2003. In October 2003, Yellowcard appeared at Shocktoberfest and on IMX before playing a handful of shows later that month. In November, the band went on a US tour with Less Than Jake and Fall Out Boy, and performed on Jimmy Kimmel Live! "Ocean Avenue" was released to radio on December 16, 2003. They opened 2004 with a Canadian tour with Eve 6 and Jersey. On March 3, 2004, the band appeared on The Tonight Show with Jay Leno. Around this time, Lewis was kicked out of the band and replaced by Mosely. In March and April 2004, the band went on a co-headlined a US tour with Something Corporate, and was supported by Steriogram and the Format. The band later toured Europe in May 2004 with Less Than Jake and the A.K.A.s. On May 18, 2004, Yellowcard appeared on Late Night with Conan O'Brien. "Way Away" was released as a single in the UK on May 31, 2004.

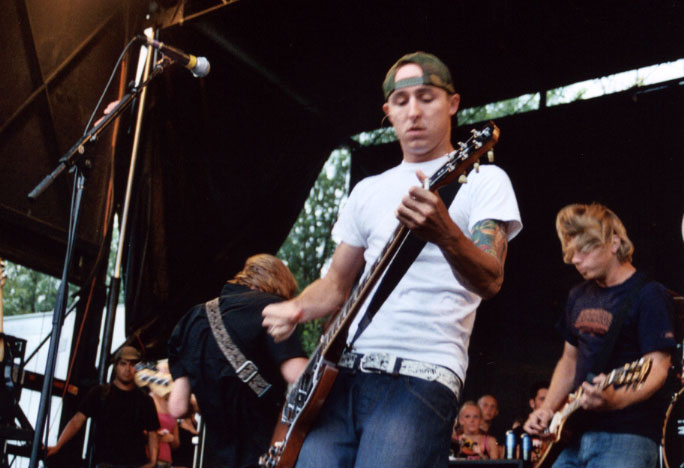
Yellowcard toured throughout 2003 and 2004 for Ocean Avenue.

In June 2004, "Only One" was released as a single; the CD version included an AOL Session version of "View from Heaven" and a live version of "Miles Apart". The music video for "Only One" was directed by Phil Harder and was filmed prior to the European tour. According to Key, the video was "a love story that is surrounded by a lot of chaos and confusion". After appearing at the main stage on Warped Tour, the band performed at the MTV Video Music Awards. They played a few European shows with New Found Glory before embarking on tours in Australia and Japan. "Ocean Avenue" was released as a single in the UK on September 6, 2004; the CD version included "Firewater", an acoustic version of "Way Away", and the music video for "Ocean Avenue". The video sees a woman steal something from Key, who then proceeds to chase her; he is in turn being chased by two villains, played by Mackin and Parsons. Around this time, "Believe" was released as a single to honor the anniversary of the September 11 attacks. In October and November 2004, the band went on a six-week tour of the US.

=== Reissues and related releases ===
In November 2004, the live/video album Beyond Ocean Avenue: Live at the Electric Factory was released. It featured footage from a show earlier in the year, as well as a documentary on the history of the band. Ocean Avenue was pressed on vinyl for the first time in 2011 through Hopeless Records, individually and as part of the box set 2002–2011 Collection. It was re-pressed by Hopeless Records in 2014, and by Field Day Records in 2021. In 2013, the band released an acoustic version of the album, Ocean Avenue Acoustic, in honor of the album's tenth anniversary. The band toured the acoustic album later in 2013 and again in early 2014. "Way Away", "Ocean Avenue", "Empty Apartment", "Life of a Salesman", "Only One", and "Believe" were included on the band's first compilation album Greatest Hits (2011).

== Critical reception ==
Professional ratings
Review scores
Source	Rating
AllMusic	3.5/5 stars
Blender	3/5 stars
Drowned in Sound	2/10
Entertainment Weekly	C
Gigwise	2.5/5 stars
IGN	8.7/10
laut.de	2/5 stars
Now	3/5
The Spokesman-Review	B
This Is Fake DIY	2/5 stars

Ocean Avenue received mixed reviews from music critics, many of which commented on the songwriting quality. Entertainment Weekly writer Joe Caramanica said the band laid "somewhere between A Simple Plan and blink-182, which is to say they're resilient enough not to whine, but too young to have a reason to anyhow". He added that Key "wails every song without a hint of stylistic variation, subject matter be damned." Elizabeth Bromstein of Now wrote that there was "a certain amount of drive" to the album, which offered "some neat guitar sounds as well as some nice arrangements". IGN's Nick Madsen called the album a "solid and consistent record that has made a believer out of [him]". PopMatters contributor Stephen Haag said the album "arrives at a time when pop punk's audience is maturing beyond the typical puerile fare that too many bands offer." The staff at DIY said that the opening track could lead the listener to think of the album as "just another punk rock CD." In spite of Mackin's violin giving the band some diversity from their peers, there was "still a fair share of bog standard punk rock, run of the mill stuff". Drowned in Sound reviewer Nick Lancaster dismissed Yellowcard as "merely the latest band to hop off the boy-band-punk conveyor belt for their fifteen minutes of minor fame", though he wrote that it was "[n]ever actively bad, but offensive in its lack of imagination and drive".

Reviewers were largely positive about the inclusion of Mackin's violin skills. The Spokesman-Review writer Cameron Adamson was initially sceptical of the use of violin, but "was pleasantly surprised"; as he listened to more of the album, he noted that the "energy that is felt from the start never dies". AllMusic reviewer MacKenzie Wilson wrote that the album "delivers despite of its catchy recipe", with Mackin's "impressively skilled" violin playing that helped Yellowcard "in making something sound original and fresh". Brad Maybe of CMJ New Music Report noted that the band set themselves apart with Mackin's violin; the album had "giant hooks and undeniably catchy choruses", which were "propelled to monstrous levels" by the violin. Madsen wrote that as integral was Key's vocals and Harper's guitar were to the band, Mackin's violin was "more than just a gimmick and absolutely should not be written off as one". Haag said the band with their violin parts "aren't entirely the answer to what is ailing pop punk, but they're not part of the problem either".

== Commercial performance and accolades ==
Ocean Avenue peaked at number 23 on the US Billboard 200, and has sold 1.8 million copies in the US. It also charted at number 8 in New Zealand, and number 149 in the UK. It reached number 52 on the year-end Billboard 200 for 2004. The album was certified platinum in the US by the Recording Industry Association of America (RIAA), gold in both Canada by Music Canada and New Zealand by Recorded Music NZ (RMNZ), and silver in the UK by the British Phonographic Industry (BPI).

"Way Away" charted at number 25 on Alternative Airplay. Outside of the US, it reached number 63 in the UK and number 66 in Scotland. "Ocean Avenue" charted at number 13 on Mainstream Top 40, number 21 on Adult Top 40 and Alternative Airplay, number 37 on Hot 100, and number 38 on Radio Songs. Outside of the US, the song charted at number 34 in New Zealand, number 61 in Australia, and number 65 in Scotland and the UK. It was certified double platinum by the RIAA, platinum by RMNZ, and silver by the BPI. "Only One" charted at number 15 on Alternative Airplay, number 22 on Bubbling Under Hot 100, and number 28 on Mainstream Top 40. It was certified gold in the US by the RIAA.

The music video for "Ocean Avenue" was nominated for Best New Artist in a Video and MTV2 Award at the MTV Video Music Awards. It has appeared on various best-of pop-punk album lists, being featured on lists by A.Side TV, BuzzFeed, Kerrang!, Loudwire, Rock Sound, and Rolling Stone. "Ocean Avenue" is featured on Billboard's list of the "100 Greatest Choruses of the 21st Century" and Cleveland.com's list of the top 100 pop-punk songs. Alternative Press ranked "Ocean Avenue" at number 42 on their list of the best 100 singles from the 2000s. Author Leslie Simon in her book Wish You Were Here: An Essential Guide to Your Favorite Music Scenes―from Punk to Indie and Everything in Between (2009) wrote that the album not only launched Key as an "unexpected emo sex symbol but proved that violins are actually more punk rock than you think".

== Track listing ==
All tracks are written by Yellowcard and Peter Mosely.

Ocean Avenue
No.	Title	Length
1.	"Way Away"	3:22
2.	"Breathing"	3:39
3.	"Ocean Avenue"	3:18
4.	"Empty Apartment"	3:37
5.	"Life of a Salesman"	3:19
6.	"Only One"	4:18
7.	"Miles Apart"	3:32
8.	"Twentythree"	3:28
9.	"View from Heaven"	3:22
10.	"Inside Out"	3:40
11.	"Believe"	4:31
12.	"One Year, Six Months"	3:29
13.	"Back Home"	3:56
Total length:		47:26

== Personnel ==
Adapted credits from the liner notes of Ocean Avenue.

Yellowcard

- Ryan Key – lead vocals, guitar, bass (track 6)
- Sean Mackin – violin, string arrangement, backing vocals
- Ben Harper – lead guitar
- Longineu W. Parsons III – drums

Additional musicians

- Peter Mosely – bass (all except track 6), piano (tracks 4 and 6), vocals
- Christine Choi – cello (tracks 1, 2, 4, 6 and 11)
- Rodney Wirtz – viola (tracks 1, 2, 4, 6 and 11)
- Neal Avron – string arrangement
- Alieka Wijnveldt – additional vocals (track 9)

Production and design

- Neal Avron – producer, recording
- Ryan Castle – assistant engineer
- Travis Huff – assistant engineer
- Tom Lord-Alge – mixing
- Femio Hernandez – assistant
- Ted Jensen – mastering
- Sasha Eisenman – photography
- Brittany Nash – model
- Tait Hawes – design
- Marc VanGool – guitar technician

== Charts ==
=== Weekly charts ===
Weekly chart performance for Ocean Avenue
Chart (2004)	Peak position
Australian Hitseekers Albums (ARIA)	7
Canadian Albums (Nielsen SoundScan)	32
New Zealand Albums (RMNZ)	8
UK Albums (OCC)	149
UK Rock & Metal Albums (Official Charts)	14
US Billboard 200	23

=== Year-end charts ===
Year-end chart performance for Ocean Avenue
Chart (2004)	Position
US Billboard 200	52

== Certifications ==
Certifications for Ocean Avenue
Region	Certification	Certified units/sales
Canada (Music Canada)	Gold	50,000^{^}
New Zealand (RMNZ)	Gold	7,500^{‡}
United Kingdom (BPI)	Silver	60,000^{‡}
United States (RIAA)	Platinum	1,800,000
^{^} Shipments figures based on certification alone.^{‡} Sales+streaming figures based on certification alone.
