= DU Clarion =

University of Denver student newspaper

- Type: Student newspaper
- Format: Tabloid
- Editor: Ana Júlia Rodrigues Alves
- Founded: 1899
- Headquarters: University of Denver; 2055 E. Evans Ave. Denver, CO 80210; United States
- Circulation: 1,000 (print)
- Website: duclarion.com

The DU Clarion is a student newspaper at the University of Denver. It serves as the voice of DU students. Founded in 1899, the paper's 12-person staff publishes a weekly online edition and a print edition of 800 copies, twice a quarter.

The paper is printed on recycled newsprint containing post-consumer waste.

== Topics ==
The Clarion covers stories happening on the University of Denver's campus, and local stories happening in Colorado in sections such as News, Opinions, Sports and Arts & Life.

== Other coverage ==
The Clarion is active on multiple social media platforms, including Twitter, Facebook, Instagram and Snapchat.

Although the DU Clarion has covered many controversial topics throughout the duration of its presence on the DU campus, coverage by outside sources has been somewhat limited. The DU Clarion provided extensive coverage of the student experiences of the Free Palestine encampment located on the campus from May 9–29, 2024. Student perspectives were included in some news coverage of the DU Free Palestine encampment and not in other coverage.

On January 12, 2010, an article titled "Fancy That: Seven women you meet at DU" was published in the opinion section of the Clarion. The article sparked much debate. The article itself was eventually removed from the website.

The DU Clarion also published coverage of the first United States presidential debate of 2012, which was hosted at the university's Magness Arena.

During the 2018-2019 school year, The Clarion began the "Driscoll Green Cannabis Column," where writers can publish articles related to cannabis. It is one of the few college newspapers to feature a column on cannabis, following the university's offering of the first class on cannabis journalism

In April 2024, DU Clarion resumed its weekly print edition after a four year hiatus.
