= Takeover Records =

- Founded: 1997
- Founder: Ben Harper; Greg McDonald
- Genre: Alternative rock; punk rock; pop-punk; post-hardcore
- Country of origin: U.S.
- Location: Long Beach, California

Takeover Records is a punk rock record label based in Long Beach, California, United States. The company was founded by former Yellowcard guitarist Ben Harper and his friend Greg McDonald in 1997.

== Artists ==
=== Current ===
- Bracket
- HeyMike!
- River City High
- Strike.Fire.Fall
- End of Pipe
- The Wistful Larks
- Grounds
- Parader

=== Former ===
- Craig's Brother
- GK & The Renegades
- Goodbye Soundscape
- The Crack Brothers of Dirty Jew Town
- Inspection 12
- Near Miss
- Oh No Not Stereo
- Stole Your Woman
- Yellowcard (early material only)
- Lies Like Me
- Lose The Name
- Safari So Good
- A Good Night Sound Rush
- The Upset Victory
- Paperface
- Versus the Ocean
- Infrasonic asylum
- Oh Romeo!
- A Phoenix Forever (digital only)
- Love It or Leave It (digital only)
- iLLFX

== See also ==
- List of record labels
