= Ryan Key =

American rock musician (born 1979)

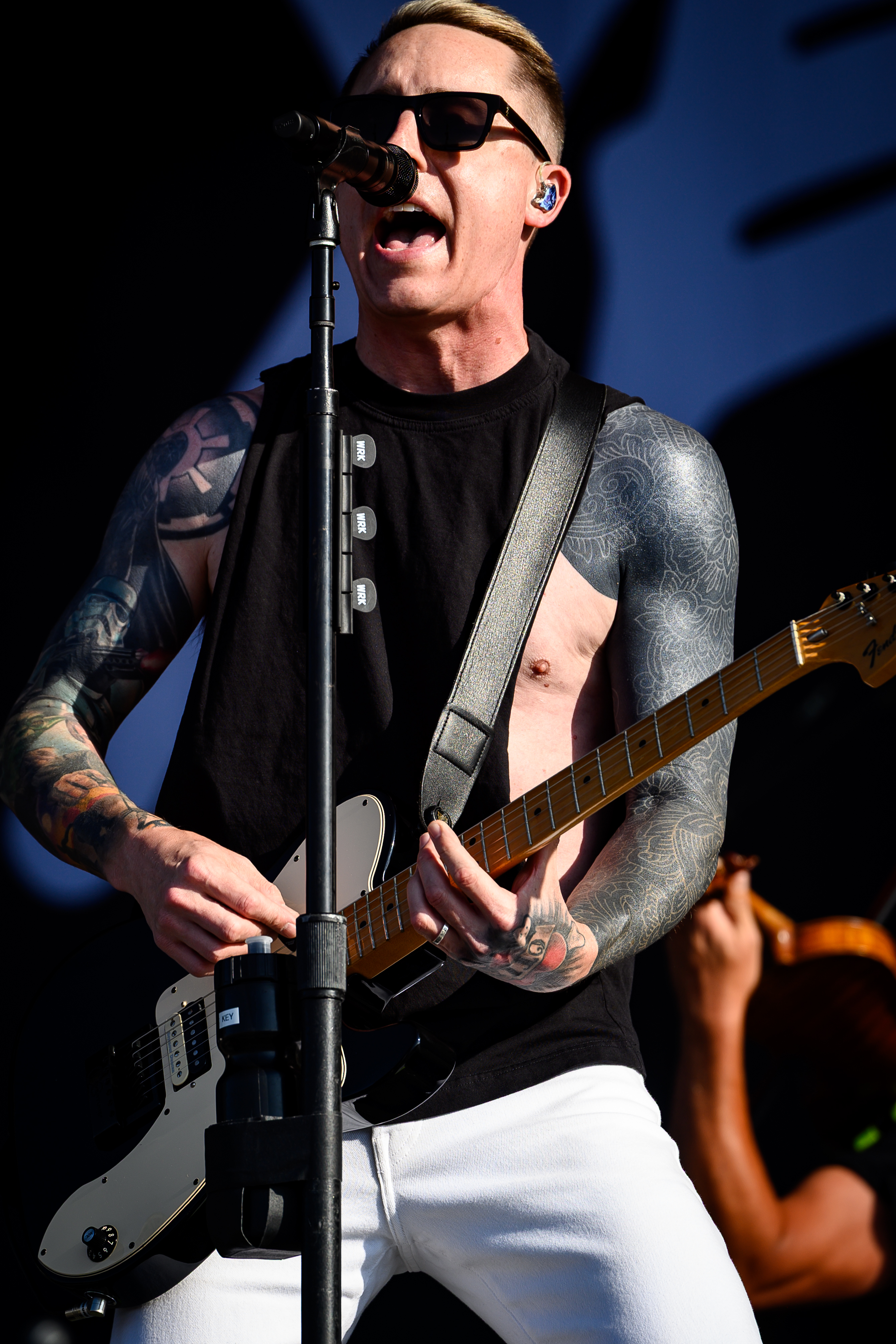
- Key performing with Yellowcard in 2025

Background information
- Born: William Ryan Key; December 17, 1979 (age 46); Jacksonville, Florida, U.S.
- Genres: Pop-punk; punk rock; alternative rock; acoustic
- Occupations: Singer; musician; songwriter
- Instruments: Vocals; guitar
- Years active: 1997–present
- Member of: Yellowcard
- Formerly of: Modern Amusement; Craig's Brother
- Website: www.yellowcardrock.com

William Ryan Key (born December 17, 1979) is an American musician. He is best known as the lead vocalist and rhythm guitarist of the rock band Yellowcard. He is the owner/operator of a recording studio in Jacksonville, Florida, called The Lone Tree Recordings. He is currently writing music under his full name, William Ryan Key, as a solo acoustic act and electronic act. He is also one half of JEDHA, an electronic duo consisting of himself and lead guitarist of Yellowcard, Ryan Mendez. He has recently toured as guitarist/vocalist/keyboardist for New Found Glory. In late 2018, he played as a supporting act on Mayday Parade's Sunnyland tour along with This Wild Life. During 2021, he live-streamed his songwriting process on Twitch full-time.

== Early life ==
William Ryan Key was born on December 17, 1979, in Jacksonville, Florida. He first used a piano at the age of 7 and a guitar at age 13. He attended Episcopal High School of Jacksonville before transferring to Douglas Anderson School of the Arts from which he graduated. Ryan then attended Florida State University together with fellow musician Dan McLintock from the local pop punk band Inspection 12, inviting Ryan to perform guest vocals on their 1999 album Step into the Fire for the song "Nothing to Lose". They majored in theater for a short while before dropping out to go to Santa Cruz, California and audition together for the Tooth & Nail punk rock band Craig's Brother, which was looking for two guitarists and backup vocalists. They were successful, but after touring for a while, at one time representing the band as an acoustic duo at the Cornerstone Festival, the band's van broke down and with the tour abruptly cancelled, Ryan moved back to Jacksonville and took a shift at Chili's with bandmate and friend Sean Mackin.

== Music career ==
=== Yellowcard ===
Key contributed to Yellowcard, although he was not yet a member at the time due to performing with Craig's Brother, by providing backing vocals for their first album. Key came back and replaced Ben Dobson as Yellowcard's lead singer in 2000 after being asked by guitarist Ben Harper. The band then released the Still Standing EP in early 2000. Shortly after the release of their EP, Todd Clary left the band. Key then became rhythm guitarist as well. The band then moved to Camarillo, CA after being signed to Lobster Records. They then began working on their next album.

The group released their third album, One for the Kids, in 2001 and followed up with The Underdog EP in 2002. After the release of The Underdog EP, Warren Cooke left the band for personal reasons. The band later asked close friend Peter Mosely from Inspection 12 to become the band's new bass guitarist. After Yellowcard released The Underdog EP the band signed with Capitol Records, who were looking to sign pop punk bands at the time. Yellowcard then began the recording of their major-label debut album Ocean Avenue in late 2002, gaining the band major success. Mosely left during recording of the album due to personal problems. The band then asked Alex Lewis to join as the bass guitarist. Yellowcard released their album Ocean Avenue on July 22, 2003, reached No. 23 on U.S. Billboard 200, the album was a commercial success in the United States with the hit singles Way Away, Ocean Avenue, and Only One.

In late 2004, Lewis left the band after Peter Mosely rejoined as the band's bassist. In 2005, Parsons went with the other band members to Los Angeles while Key and Mosely moved to New York City to create new material for their next album. Lead guitarist Ben Harper left the band in April after finishing guitar tracks for the album. The band then asked Ryan Mendez from the band Staring Back to become the new lead guitarist.

The album Lights and Sounds was released in January 2006, unlike their last album Ocean Avenue, Lights and Sounds broke away from the band's pop punk sound to a more alternative rock album. The album peaked at No. 5 on the U.S. Billboard 200. The title track, "Lights and Sounds", was the first single, released a week before the album. It peaked at No. 4 on the Billboard Hot Modern Rock Tracks. Lights and Sounds did well on the charts and reviews, but failed to match the 2 million sales of the band's previous album.

On October 16, 2006, the band re-entered the studio to begin pre-production on their next album. Paper Walls was released in the U.S. on July 17, 2007, the album debuted at No. 13 on the U.S. Billboard 200 selling about 40,000 copies in its first week. The band spent the rest of the year promoting their new album nonstop since its release while touring with Linkin Park and Blue October. Yellowcard released their live album Live from Las Vegas at the Palms on January 22, 2008.

In April 2008, Yellowcard officially announced an "indefinite hiatus" canceling their European and acoustic tours. The band stated the reason why they went on hiatus was to focus on their personal lives for the time.

On August 1, 2010, it was confirmed that Yellowcard had ended their hiatus and was working on a new record, titled When You're Through Thinking, Say Yes to be released on Hopeless Records in early 2011. The band toured Europe in March 2011 alongside All Time Low. Yellowcard released three more albums, Southern Air (2012), Lift a Sail (2014) and the eponymous Yellowcard (2016), before disbanding in 2017.

Yellowcard reunited at Riot Fest on September 17, 2022. The band then embarked on tour to commemorate the twentieth anniversary of Ocean Avenue in 2023. The band released the EP, Childhood Eyes, on July 21, 2023.

=== Other work ===
During the Yellowcard hiatus that began in 2008, Key also started singing in a side project entitled "Big If" with singer Sean O'Donnell of Reeve Oliver in February 2009. Big If has released several songs on their MySpace page, but have not yet released a record. They are not currently signed to a record deal. Although they have never officially announced their break-up, all members of the band are now in Yellowcard and the band's Twitter and MySpace pages have been removed.

Key recorded a song entitled "Stop Right There" with Hollywood-based pop-punk band Assemble the Skyline. The track was released on January 7, 2011, with Assemble the Skyline's new EP "Right Here. Right Now". Ryan also collaborated with the Michigan pop-punk band Every Avenue. He has co-written their songs "Girl Like That" from their album Picture Perfect, and "Tie Me Down" from their album Bad Habits.

He also worked with Taboo of the Black Eyed Peas, contributing vocals on his song "Gotta Get it Now".

Key also contributed guest vocals on a new Silverstein song, entitled "Stay Posi", released in early 2011.

Key and fellow Yellowcard member, Ryan Mendez, spent May 2012 producing and recording the Like Torches album Keep Your Head High.

In January and February 2015, Key stayed in Stockholm, Sweden where he produced a new album for Like Torches.

In August 2015, Key started a Kickstarter campaign for his new project The Lone Tree Recordings. The goal was to reach $75,000 by September 20 so that Key could start his record label, and he ultimately raised $106,372 to make that happen. One of the first bands to record was his side music projects Will & The Whiskeymen. He stated on the Kickstater page that the band's EP would be a Kickstarter-backer exclusive.

In September 2017, it was announced that Key would perform with Linkin Park in the Linkin Park and Friends – Celebrate Life in Honor of Chester Bennington, to celebrate late Linkin Park frontman Chester Bennington. He was featured in the songs "Shadow of the Day" and the U2 song "With or Without You".

In October 2017, Key announced that he would produce a new Like Torches record in his newly built Lone Tree Recordings Studio.

On January 16, 2018, it was announced that he will be touring with New Found Glory on their "SICK TOUR" beginning in May 2018, as their second guitarist, keyboardist and "whatever other tricks songs call for", according to the band.

On May 18, 2018, Key released the first single, "Vultures", from his EP, titled Thirteen.

On September 14, 2018, Key released "The Bowery", from his upcoming EP, titled Virtue.

In December 2020, Key announced that he was working on an album of reimagined Yellowcard songs in his new musical style. The first of these songs released exclusively for his Patreon subscribers was Ocean Avenue. He later revealed that he was working with Post-Rock Band Hammock on remixed versions of his reimagined tracks. He has since allowed his Twitch viewers to vote on which songs he works on for the project live on stream.

On May 31, 2021, Key announced, alongside Mendez, their new electronic project named JEDHA, with new music slated to release that same year. On June 7, 2021, the duo released the first song from the project, titled "Dividing Pair".

On December 15, 2021, Key signed to record labels Equal Vision and Rude and announced his new EP, Everything Except Desire, which was released on February 11, 2022.

== Non-musical projects ==
In 2008, Key worked with Patrick Stump and Pete Wentz of Fall Out Boy in a film called Moustachette. He has appeared as a Made coach on the MTV series MADE and featured in MTV Cribs. He also had an appearance as a partygoer in the 2008 film Cloverfield, and appeared in the film How to Make Love to a Woman in 2010.

== Discography ==
Solo

- Thirteen EP (2018)
- Virtue EP (2018)
- Everything Except Desire EP (2022)

with Yellowcard

- Still Standing (2000)
- One for the Kids (2001)
- The Underdog EP (2002)
- Ocean Avenue (2003)
- Lights and Sounds (2006)
- Paper Walls (2007)
- When You're Through Thinking, Say Yes (2011)
- Southern Air (2012)
- Ocean Avenue Acoustic (2013)
- Lift a Sail (2014)
- Yellowcard (2016)
- Childhood Eyes (2023)
- Better Days (2025)

== Personal life ==
In 2012, Key became engaged to Alyona Alekhina. They married in 2013 in a hospital intensive care unit after Alekhina injured her spinal cord. The couple later separated.

On May 14, 2022, Key announced to his Discord community that he became engaged to Laura Gillway while on a trip to Walt Disney World. Ryan and Laura married in December 2022, and live in Jacksonville, Florida. On July 24, 2023, the couple announced they were expecting their first child. Their son was born on December 11, 2023.
