= Sean Mackin (musician) =

American violinist (born 1979)

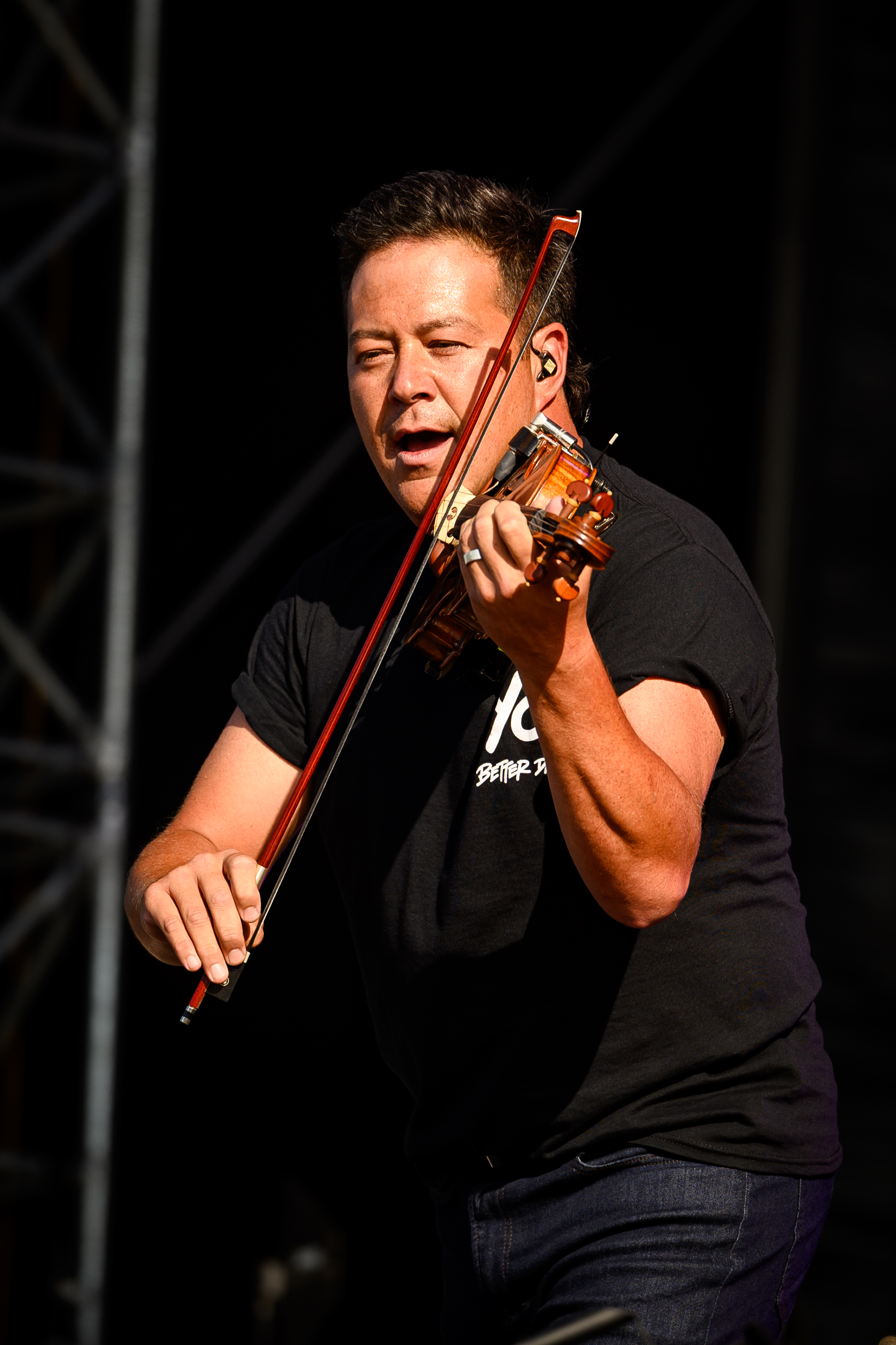
- Mackin performing with Yellowcard in 2025

Background information
- Born: Sean Michael Wellman; April 30, 1979 (age 47); Denver, Colorado, U.S.
- Origin: Jacksonville, Florida, U.S.
- Genres: Alternative rock; pop punk; punk rock
- Occupation: Musician
- Instruments: Violin; mandolin; vocals
- Years active: 1997–present
- Member of: Yellowcard
- Spouse: Cat Mackin
- Website: yellowcardrock.com

Sean Michael Wellman (born April 30, 1979) is an American musician. He is the violinist for the rock band Yellowcard and the only original member left in the band.

== Early life ==
Mackin is of Irish and Japanese descent. He attended Florida State University majoring in electrical engineering and international business. He is a member of Phi Sigma Kappa fraternity. Mackin also got a job at Chili's with bandmate and friend Ryan Key.

== Career with Yellowcard ==
Mackin joined the band in 1997, from high school friends Ben Harper and Longineu W. Parsons III. At first, Mackin had been asked not to play the violin in some songs by Yellowcard, but ever since the group decided to keep Mackin as a permanent member, he has taken the role of violinist and back-up vocalist. Yellowcard released their first album, Midget Tossing, in 1997 and released their second album, Where We Stand in 1999. After lead singer Ben Dobson left the band he was replaced by Ryan Key, who was formerly in the California band Craig's Brother and joined after being asked by guitarist Ben Harper. As Ryan's friend Dan McLintock from Jacksonville pop punk band Inspection 12 was still with Craig's Brother at the time and they were currently in the studio recording their second album Lost at Sea, Sean was drafted to record violin for their song "Back and Forth".

The band then released the Still Standing EP in early 2000. Shortly after the release of their EP Todd Clary left the band, Key then filled in as the rhythm guitarist. The band then moved to Camarillo, CA, after being signed to Lobster Records. They then begin working on their next album.

The group released their third album, One for the Kids in 2001 and followed up with The Underdog EP in 2002. After the release of The Underdog EP, Warren Cooke left the band for personal reasons. The band later asked close friend Peter Mosely from Inspection 12, to become the band's new bass guitarist. After Yellowcard released The Underdog EP the band signed with Capitol Records, who were looking to sign pop punk bands at the time. Yellowcard then began the recording of their major-label debut album Ocean Avenue in late 2002, gaining the band major success. Mosely left during recording of the album due to personal problems. The band then asked Alex Lewis to join as the bass guitarist. Yellowcard released their album Ocean Avenue on July 22, 2003, reaching No. 23 on U.S. Billboard 200, the album was a commercial success in the United States with the hit singles Way Away, Ocean Avenue, and Only One.

In late 2004 Lewis left the band after Peter Mosely rejoined as the band's bassist. In 2005 Mackin moved with the other band members to Los Angeles while Key and Mosely moved to New York City to create new material for their next album. Lead guitarist Ben Harper left the band in April after finishing guitar tracks for the album. The band then asked Ryan Mendez from the band Staring Back to become the new lead guitarist.

The album Lights and Sounds was released in January 2006, unlike their last album Ocean Avenue, Lights and Sounds broke away from the band's pop punk sound to a more alternative rock album. The album peaked at No. 5 on the U.S. Billboard 200. The title track, "Lights and Sounds", was the first single, released a week before the album. It peaked at No. 4 on the Billboard Hot Modern Rock Tracks.

October 16, 2006, the band re-entered the studio to begin pre-production on their next album. Paper Walls was released in the U.S. on July 17, 2007, the album debuted at No. 13 on the U.S. Billboard 200 selling about 40,000 copies in its first week. The band spent the rest of the year promoting their new album nonstop since its release while touring with Linkin Park and Blue October.

The band needed to reschedule several dates during their European leg of their tour in January while Parsons went home to spend time with family. Yellowcard released their live album Live from Las Vegas at the Palms on January 22, 2008. It was recorded during their Blue October Tour in October 2007 in Las Vegas.

In April 2008 Yellowcard officially announced an "indefinite hiatus" canceling their European and acoustic tours. The band stated the reason why they went on hiatus was to focus on their personal lives for the time.

On August 1, 2010, it was confirmed that Yellowcard had ended their hiatus and was working on a new record, titled When You're Through Thinking, Say Yes to be released on Hopeless Records in early 2011. The band toured Europe in March 2011 alongside All Time Low.

In December 2011, Mackin was diagnosed with thyroid cancer. In response to Mackin's announcement regarding his diagnosis, a group of fans started the Strong for Sean project. They made and sold a limited number of bracelets to show their support. All money raised was donated to the American Cancer Society in Mackin's name.

Yellowcard is currently on tour to commemorate the twentieth anniversary of Ocean Avenue in 2023. The band released the EP, Childhood Eyes, on July 21, 2023.

== Discography ==
- Midget Tossing (1997)
- Where We Stand (1999)
- One for the Kids (2001)
- Ocean Avenue (2003)
- Lights and Sounds (2006)
- Paper Walls (2007)
- Live from Las Vegas at the Palms (2008)
- When You're Through Thinking, Say Yes (2011)
- Southern Air (2012)
- Ocean Avenue Acoustic (2013)
- Lift a Sail (2014)
- Yellowcard (2016)
- Childhood Eyes (2023)
- Better Days (2025)
