= Longineu W. Parsons III =

French-born American rock musician (born 1980)

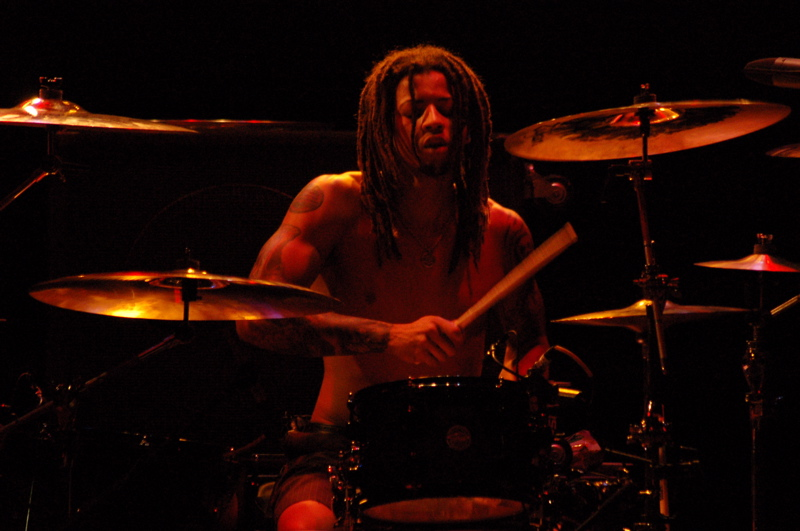
- Parsons performing with Yellowcard in 2006

Background information
- Also known as: LP, Da Pizz, Da Pizzle, Pizzle, Animal
- Born: Longineu Warren Parsons III; February 16, 1980 (age 46); Paris, France
- Origin: Jacksonville, Florida, U.S.
- Genres: Alternative rock; pop-punk; punk rock; hardcore punk
- Occupation: Musician
- Instruments: Drums; percussion; piano; bass
- Labels: Hopeless; Capitol; Takeover; Fueled By Ramen; Lobster; DIY
- Member of: KRASH PARTY; Vilano
- Formerly of: This Legend; Yellowcard; Evergreen Terrace

Longineu Warren "LP" Parsons III (born February 16, 1980) is a French-born American rock musician. He is best known as the founding drummer of the American rock band Yellowcard. He played on all of the band's studio albums from their debut outing Midget Tossing (1997) through their eighth album Southern Air (2012). He departed from the band in 2014. Parsons was also the drummer of American metalcore band Evergreen Terrace from 2022 to 2026.

== Early life ==
Parsons has been playing the drums since he was five; he played with his father, Longineu W. Parsons II, in his band The Longineu Parsons Ensemble.

== Music career ==
=== Yellowcard (1997–2014) ===
Parsons joined Yellowcard in 1997 along with Ben Dobson, Todd Clary, Warren Cooke and Ben Harper after meeting at Douglas Anderson School of the Arts. He appeared on each album from 1997's Midget Tossing until 2013's Ocean Avenue Acoustic.

On March 13, 2014, Parsons left Yellowcard. By this point, Parsons had been one of two remaining members of the original lineup, along with Sean Mackin. According to their Facebook page, the band said in a joint statement, "Longineu has decided to pursue other musical interests. We wish him the best of luck in his future endeavors."

=== This Legend: (2014–2017) ===
In June 2014, Parsons and former Yellowcard bandmate Ben Harper formed a new band with Chris Castillo (lead vocals and rhythm guitar) and Steven Neufeld (bass guitar) called This Legend. They released their first album It's In The Streets on November 11, 2014. The band played several shows across the U.S. to promote the album.

As of 2017, the band is on hiatus due to band members' other interests. Parsons began playing drums with Ten Foot Pole and Stages and Stereos.

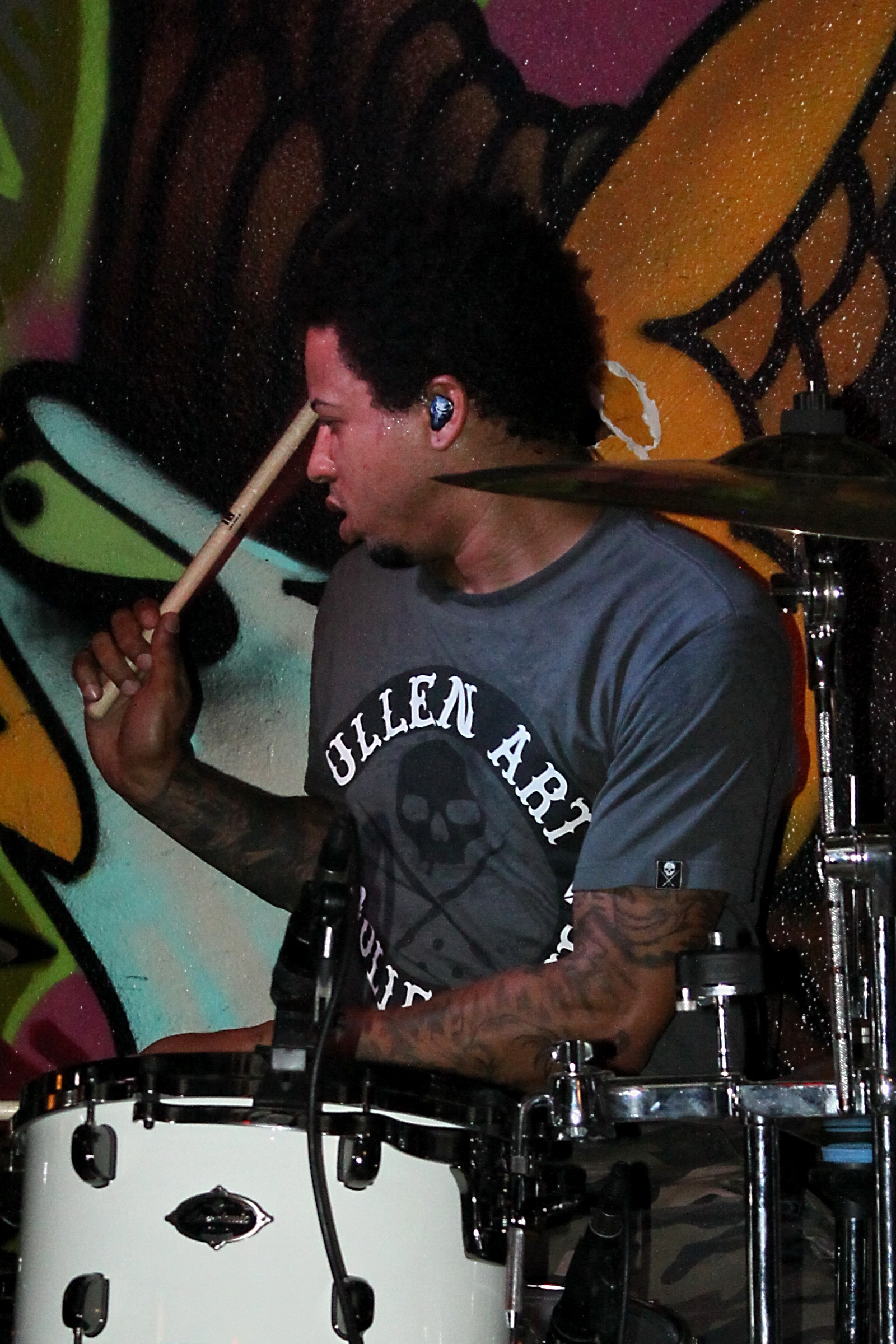
Parsons performing in 2014

=== Vilano (since 2022) ===
Vilano is a modern rock band from St. Augustine, Florida. The band consists of vocalist Stephen Drawdy, drummer Longineu Parsons III, guitarist Adam Otoski, and bassist Nick Holtz.

Vilano released their full-length album, "No Rain, No Flowers" in March 2021.

=== Evergreen Terrace (2022-2026) ===
In July 2022, Parsons was hired as the new drummer for the metalcore band Evergreen Terrace. In March 2026, Parsons announced on his Instagram that Brad Moxey was returning to Evergreen Terrace and that he would no longer be a member of the band.

=== KRASH PARTY (since 2023) ===
Krash Party is a Pop Punk/Alt band from St. Augustine, Florida. Formed by Shannon Fitz (Vocals), Longineu (Drums), & Aaron Grove (Guitar)

=== Other work: 2008–present ===
During the Yellowcard hiatus, Parsons played drums for Adam Lambert from October 2009 through September 2010. Parsons founded rap-rock group LPMD with producer Miles M. Davis. Their debut album, Off The Record, was released on September 27, 2011.

== Discography ==
Yellowcard

- Midget Tossing (1997)
- Where We Stand (1999)
- Still Standing (2000)
- One for the Kids (2001)
- The Underdog EP (2002)
- Ocean Avenue (2003)
- Lights and Sounds (2006)
- Paper Walls (2007)
- Live from Las Vegas at the Palms (2008)
- When You're Through Thinking, Say Yes (2011)
- Southern Air (2012)
- Ocean Avenue Acoustic (2013)

LPMD

- Off the Record (2011)

This Legend

- It's In The Streets (2014)
