= Yellowcard discography =

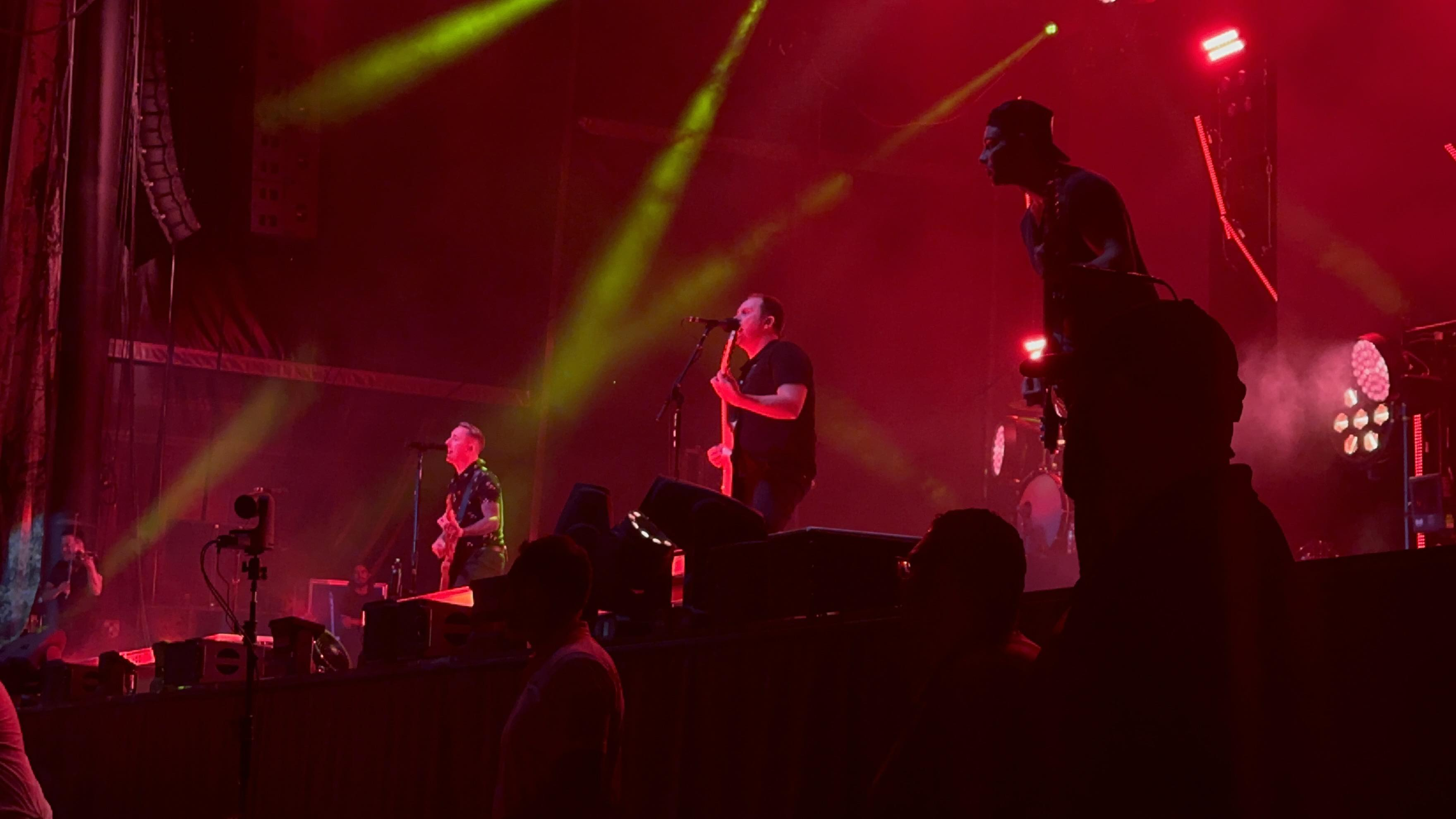
- Yellowcard in 2023
- Studio albums: 10
- Extended plays: 4
- Live albums: 2
- Compilation albums: 3
- Singles: 12
- Video albums: 1
- Music videos: 24

The discography of Yellowcard, an American pop punk band from Jacksonville, Florida, consists of ten studio albums, twelve singles, two live albums, four extended plays, one video album, and four compilation albums.

Yellowcard with their original frontman & founder Benjamin Harper released their debut album, Midget Tossing, on April 1, 1997, via DIY Records. This album, along with their next two efforts, Where We Stand (1999) and Ryan Key's debut One for the Kids (2001), failed to garner any chart success on the Billboard music charts. Also, no singles were ever released from any of these albums.

However, in 2003, they achieved breakthrough success with the release of their major label debut Ocean Avenue. The album charted within the Top 30 of the Billboard 200, as well as the Top 10 in New Zealand. The album's title track was a Billboard Hot 100 Top 40 single and was certified Platinum by the Recording Industry Association of America, becoming a seminal pop punk song. The follow-up single, "Only One", was certified Gold. The album was then certified Platinum in the US by July 2004 and remains as Yellowcard's commercial peak.

Their fifth album, Lights and Sounds (2006), was an even bigger success on the Billboard 200, peaking within the Top 5. While not charting a Top 40 single on the Hot 100, the album's title track reached number 50 on the chart, as well as becoming their highest chart entry on the Hot Modern Rock Tracks (now Alternative Songs) chart. They then released Paper Walls in 2007 before taking a two-year hiatus in 2008.

They reformed in 2010 and released When You're Through Thinking, Say Yes on March 22, 2011. Southern Air, was released on August 14, 2012 to universal acclaim. Lift a Sail was released October 7, 2014 to generally favorable reviews. Their eponymous tenth studio album was released September 30, 2016.

The band returned with the release of an EP, Childhood Eyes, on July 21, 2023.

== Albums ==
=== Studio albums ===
Album title	Details	Peak chart positions										Certifications (sales threshold)
Album title	Details	US	AUS	AUT	CAN	GER	ITA	NZ	SCO	SWI	UK	Certifications (sales threshold)
Midget Tossing	Released: April 1, 1997; Label: DIY; Format: CD, DL	—	—	—	—	—	—	—	—	—	—	
Where We Stand	Released: July 20, 1999; Label: Takeover; Format: CD, DL	—	—	—	—	—	—	—	—	—	—	
One for the Kids	Released: April 3, 2001; Label: Lobster; Format: CD, DL, LP+7" vinyl	—	—	—	—	—	—	—	—	—	—	
Ocean Avenue	Released: July 22, 2003; Label: Capitol; Format: CD, CS, DL, LP	23	— (Note: Ocean Avenue did not enter the Australian ARIA Albums Chart but peaked at number seven on the ARIA Hitseekers Chart.)	—	32	—	—	8	—	—	149	RIAA: Platinum; BPI: Silver; MC: Gold; RMNZ: Gold
Lights and Sounds	Released: January 24, 2006; Label: Capitol; Format: CD, CD+DVD-V, CS, DL, LP	5	6	67	4	—	84	11	77	73	59	RIAA: Gold; MC: Gold
Paper Walls	Released: July 17, 2007; Label: Capitol; Format: CD, CD+DVD-V, DL, LP	13	25	—	20	—	—	—	—	—	113	
When You're Through Thinking, Say Yes	Released: March 22, 2011; Label: Hopeless; Format: CD, DL, LP	19	41	—	42	—	—	—	—	—	84	
Southern Air	Released: August 14, 2012; Label: Hopeless; Format: CD, DL, LP	10	30	75	—	91	—	—	62	—	60	
Lift a Sail	Released: October 7, 2014; Label: Razor & Tie; Format: CD, DL, LP	26	21	—	—	—	—	—	79	—	75	
Yellowcard	Released: September 30, 2016; Label: Hopeless; Format: CD, DL, LP	28	14	—	—	—	—	—	80	—	— (Note: Yellowcard did not enter the UK Albums Chart, but peaked at number 51 on the UK Album Downloads Chart Top 100.)	
Better Days	Released: October 10, 2025; Label: Better Noise Music; Format: CD, DL, LP	— (Note: Better Days did not enter the US Billboard 200 Chart, but peaked at number 31 on the Top Album Sales chart.)	56	—	—	—	—	—	—	—	— (Note: Better Days did not enter the UK Albums Chart, but peaked at number 28 on the UK Album Downloads Chart Top 100.)	
"—" denotes an album that has not charted or was not released in that territory.

=== Live albums ===
Title	Album details
Sessions@AOL	Released: September 7, 2004; Label: Capitol; Format: DL
iTunes Live from Las Vegas at the Palms	Released: January 22, 2008; Label: Capitol; Format: DL

=== Compilation albums ===
Title	Album details
Deep Cuts	Released: June 16, 2009; Label: Capitol; Format: DL
Greatest Hits Tour Edition	Released: January 26, 2011 (Europe only); Label: Capitol; Format: CD, DL
Greatest Hits	Released: May 25, 2011 (Japan only); Label: Capitol; Format: CD, DL
A Hopeful Sign (with Hammock)	Released: February 9, 2024; Label: Equal Vision; Format: CD, DL, LP

=== Other albums ===
Album title	Details	Peak chart positions				
Album title	Details	US	US Indie	US Rock	UK DL	UK Indie
When You're Through Thinking, Say Yes (Acoustic)	Released: October 25, 2011; Label: Hopeless; Format: CD, DL	—	44	47	28	—
Ocean Avenue Acoustic	Released: August 13, 2013; Label: Hopeless; Format: CD, DL, LP	53	11	11	—	25

== Extended plays ==
Title	Extended play details
Still Standing EP	Released: 2000; Label: DIY; Format: CD
The Underdog EP	Released: July 9, 2002; Label: Fueled by Ramen (FBR053); Format: CD, 12" vinyl
A Perfect Sky	Released: April 18, 2015; Label: Razor & Tie (7930183647); Format: 10" vinyl
Childhood Eyes	Released: July 21, 2023; Label: Equal Vision; Format: CD, DL, EP

== Singles ==
Title	Year	Peak chart positions										Certifications (sales threshold)	Album
Title	Year	US	US Alt	US Pop	AUS	BLR	CAN Pop	NZ	SCO	UK	UK Rock	Certifications (sales threshold)	Album
"Way Away"	2003	—	25	—	—	—	—	—	66	63	—		Ocean Avenue
"Ocean Avenue"	2004	37	21	13	61	—	29	34	63	65	4	RIAA: 2× Platinum; BPI: Silver; RMNZ: Platinum	Ocean Avenue
"Only One"	2005	— (Note: "Only One" did not enter the Billboard Hot 100, but peaked at number 22 on the Bubbling Under Hot 100 Singles chart.)	15	28	—	—	—	—	—	—	—	RIAA: Gold	Ocean Avenue
"Lights and Sounds"	2005	50	4	42	24	—	—	23	41	56	—		Lights and Sounds
"Rough Landing, Holly"	2006	—	27	—	49	—	—	—	—	—	—		Lights and Sounds
"Light Up the Sky"	2007	—	—	— (Note: "Light Up the Sky" did not enter the Pop Airplay chart, but peaked at number 32 on the Adult Pop Airplay chart.)	—	—	—	—	—	—	—		Paper Walls
"For You, and Your Denial"	2011	100	— (Note: "For You, and Your Denial" did not enter the Alternative Songs chart, but peaked at number five on the Alternative Digital Song Sales chart.)	—	—	—	—	—	—	—	—		When You're Through Thinking, Say Yes
"Hang You Up"	2011	—	— (Note: "Hang You Up" did not enter the Alternative Songs chart, but peaked at number 17 on the Alternative Digital Song Sales chart.)	—	—	—	—	—	—	—	—		When You're Through Thinking, Say Yes
"Sing for Me"	2011	—	— (Note: "Sing for Me" did not enter the Alternative Songs chart, but peaked at number 17 on the Alternative Digital Song Sales chart.)	—	—	—	—	—	—	—	—		When You're Through Thinking, Say Yes
"Always Summer"	2012	—	— (Note: "Always Summer" did not enter the Alternative Songs chart, but peaked at number 17 on the Alternative Digital Song Sales chart.)	—	—	—	—	—	—	—	—		Southern Air
"Here I Am Alive"	2012	—	—	—	—	—	—	—	—	—	—		Southern Air
"One Bedroom"	2014	—	—	—	—	—	—	—	—	—	—		Lift a Sail
"Rest in Peace"	2016	—	—	—	—	—	—	—	—	—	—		Yellowcard
"Childhood Eyes"	2023	—	—	—	—	—	—	—	—	—	—		Childhood Eyes
"Ocean Avenue" (with Hammock)	2024	—	—	—	—	—	—	—	—	—	—		A Hopeful Sign
"Better Days"	2025	—	1	—	—	95	—	—	—	—	—		Better Days
"Take What You Want"	2025	—	—	—	—	—	—	—	—	—	—		Better Days
"Bedroom Posters" (original or with Good Charlotte)	2026	—	1	—	—	—	—	—	—	—	—		Better Days
"—" denotes a recording that did not chart or was not released in that territory.

== Other charted songs ==
Title	Year	Peak chart positions	Album
Title	Year	CZ Rock	Album
"Transmission Home"	2014	17	Lift a Sail

== Other appearances ==
Year	Album	Contributed song
2002	Punk Goes Pop	"Everywhere" (Michelle Branch cover)
2002	Because We Care: A Benefit for the Children's Hospital of Orange County	"Rough Draft (electric version)"
2002	Plea For Peace/Take Action Vol. 2	"Powder"
2003	Punk Goes Acoustic	"Firewater"
2004	Spider-Man 2	"Gifts and Curses"
2004	Rock Against Bush, Vol. 2	"Violins" (Lagwagon cover)
2007	Instant Karma: The Amnesty International Campaign to Save Darfur	"Oh My Love" (John Lennon cover)
2013	The Songs of Tony Sly: A Tribute	"Already Won" (Tony Sly cover)
2013	Punk Goes Christmas	"Christmas Lights" (Coldplay cover)
2014	Punk Goes 90s 2	"Today" (The Smashing Pumpkins cover)
2016	Non-Album Track	"Ready & Willing" (New Found Glory cover)
2024	A Whole New Sound	"A Whole New World" (featuring Chrissy Costanza) (Aladdin cover)

== Videography ==
=== Video albums ===
Year	Album details	Certifications (sales threshold)
2004	Beyond Ocean Avenue: Live at the Electric Factory: First DVD/video album; Release date: November 12, 2004; Label: Capitol Records	CAN: Gold; US: Platinum

=== Music videos ===
Year	Song	Director
2002	"Powder"	Scott Culver
2003	"Way Away"	Patrick Hoelck
2004	"Ocean Avenue"	Marc Webb
2005	"Only One"	Phil Harder
2005	"Lights and Sounds"	Marc Webb
2006	"Rough Landing, Holly"	Marc Webb
2007	"Light Up the Sky"	Lisa Mann
2011	"For You, and Your Denial"	Chris Marrs Piliero
2011	"Hang You Up"	Chris Marrs Piliero
2011	"Sing for Me"	Robby Starbuck
2011	"With You Around" (acoustic version)	Robby Starbuck
2011	"See Me Smiling" (acoustic version)	Robby Starbuck
2011	"Be the Young" (acoustic version)	Robby Starbuck
2012	"Always Summer"	Robby Starbuck
2012	"Here I Am Alive"	Robby Starbuck
2012	"Telescope" (acoustic version)	
2012	"Awakening"	
2014	"One Bedroom"	Nico Sabenorio
2014	"The Deepest Well"	
2015	"Crash the Gates"	
2015	"California"	
2016	"Rest in Peace"	Skye Aldrin
2016	"The Hurt Is Gone"	Erik Rojas
2017	"A Place We Set Afire"	David Garcia and Megan Thompson
2023	"Childhood Eyes"	Jordan Phoenix
2025	"Better Days"	Jordan Phoenix
2025	"Take What You Want"	Kevin Duffel
2026	"Bedroom Posters"	Ryan Key
