= Neal Avron =

American record producer

- Born: December 31, 1965 (age 60)
- Origin: Los Angeles, California, U.S.
- Genres: Rock; alternative rock; pop rock; pop punk; soft rock; heavy metal; alternative metal
- Occupations: Record producer; mixer; audio engineer; musician
- Instruments: Keyboards; synthesizer; trumpet
- Years active: 1993–present

Neal Avron (born December 31, 1965) is an American record producer, mixer, audio engineer, and musician. Working predominantly in rock music, Avron began working on records in 1993 and achieved his production breakthrough when he co-produced Everclear's 1997 album So Much for the Afterglow. Avron went on to produce/mix a string of successful albums from the likes of Switchfoot, New Found Glory, Fall Out Boy, Yellowcard, Weezer, You Me at Six and Anberlin.

Avron created headlines in 2010 when he mixed and/or produced each debuting number one album on the Billboard 200 for three consecutive weeks; Disturbed's Asylum, Sara Bareilles' Kaleidoscope Heart, and Linkin Park's A Thousand Suns. Avron later garnered recognition for his production work by receiving a Grammy Award nomination for Sara Bareilles' single "King of Anything" under the Best Female Pop Vocal Performance category.

Avron is noted for having particular recording techniques, believing that pre-production is essential before entering a recording studio. When recording, he prefers to lay down the drums and rhythm guitar first, as opposed to the conventional method of bass guitar and drums. Avron has noted, "Over the years I've had issues with recording bass first, especially when someone is hitting the strings really hard. For me it's difficult to tell whether the bass is in tune, because the fundamental is so low. When laying the rhythm guitars down first, it's much easier to tell whether the bass is out of tune or not. It also means that the bass has a place to fit."

== Discography ==
Selected discography (producer/mixing/engineering).

- 1997 – So Much for the Afterglow by Everclear
- 2000 – Now You See Inside by SR-71
- 2000 – Songs from an American Movie Vol. One: Learning How to Smile by Everclear
- 2000 – New Found Glory by New Found Glory
- 2001 – Transmatic by Transmatic
- 2002 – Back to the Innocence by Seven and the Sun
- 2002 – Sticks and Stones by New Found Glory
- 2002 – Headspace by Pulse Ultra
- 2002 – Tomorrow by SR-71
- 2003 – Ocean Avenue by Yellowcard
- 2003 – Die Trying by Die Trying
- 2004 – Catalyst by New Found Glory
- 2004 – Nothing New Since Rock 'n' Roll by The Fight
- 2005 – From Under the Cork Tree by Fall Out Boy
- 2005 – Make Believe by Weezer
- 2006 – Lights and Sounds by Yellowcard
- 2007 – Minutes to Midnight by Linkin Park
- 2007 – Empty Walls by Serj Tankian
- 2007 – Infinity on High by Fall Out Boy
- 2007 – Luna Halo by Luna Halo
- 2007 – Paper Walls by Yellowcard
- 2008 – Folie à Deux by Fall Out Boy
- 2008 – New Surrender by Anberlin
- 2008 – Indestructible by Disturbed
- 2009 – Artwork by The Used
- 2009 – Say Anything by Say Anything
- 2010 – Asylum by Disturbed
- 2010 – A Thousand Suns by Linkin Park
- 2010 – Kaleidoscope Heart by Sara Bareilles
- 2010 – Screamworks: Love in Theory and Practice by HIM
- 2011 – When You're Through Thinking, Say Yes by Yellowcard
- 2011 – Vice Verses by Switchfoot
- 2011 – Radiosurgery by New Found Glory
- 2012 – Southern Air by Yellowcard
- 2012 – Don't Panic by All Time Low
- 2013 – J.A.C.K. by Forever The Sickest Kids
- 2013 – Exhale by Stardog Champion
- 2014 – Cavalier Youth by You Me at Six
- 2014 – Fading West by Switchfoot
- 2014 – Lift a Sail by Yellowcard
- 2014 – Talking Is Hard by Walk the Moon
- 2014 – Mall (Soundtrack) by Chester Bennington, Dave Farrell, Joe Hahn, Mike Shinoda and Alec Puro
- 2015 – Blurryface by Twenty One Pilots
- 2015 – What's Inside: Songs From Waitress by Sara Bareilles
- 2016 – Taking One for the Team by Simple Plan
- 2016 – Waitress (Musical) by Sara Bareilles
- 2016 – Unleashed by Skillet
- 2016 – Yellowcard by Yellowcard
- 2016 – Blurryface Live by Twenty One Pilots
- 2017 – Eternity, in Your Arms by Creeper
- 2018 – America by Thirty Seconds to Mars
- 2021 – Our Bande Apart by Third Eye Blind
- 2023 – So Much (for) Stardust by Fall Out Boy
- 2023 – Childhood Eyes by Yellowcard
- 2024 – From Zero by Linkin Park
- 2024 – Revolution by Skillet
- 2025 – Sunrise City by Sub-Radio
- 2026 – Frisson Noir by Tarja Turunen
