= Nothing New Since Rock 'n' Roll =

Studio album by The Fight
- Released: 16 November 2004
- Genre: Pop punk
- Length: 41:24
- Label: Repossession Records
- Producer: Neal Avron

The Fight chronology
Home Is Where the Hate Is (2003)	Nothing New Since Rock 'n' Roll (2004)

Professional ratings
Review scores
Source	Rating
AllMusic	2/5 stars
ugo.com	B

Nothing New Since Rock 'n' Roll is the first full-length album by UK pop punk band The Fight, released in 2004. The track, "Can't Be Bothered", was featured in the 2005 film Zathura: A Space Adventure.

== Track listing ==
1. "Can't be bothered" (Turley, Turley) - 2:46
2. "Karaoke star" (Nott/Turley, Turley) - 3:09
3. "Moved on" (Turley, Turley) - 2:59
4. "Sid and Nancy" (Turley, Turley) - 1:52
5. "Forgotten Generation" (Mich Walker) - 2:25
6. "JB's" (Turley, Turley) - 3:13
7. "No more legend" (Turley, Turley) - 4:07
8. "Mommy's little soldier" (Turley, Turley) - 2:22
9. "Housewreck" (Turley, Turley) - 2:59
10. "Stage skool kidz" (Turley, Turley) - 2:57
11. "Don't tell me" (Nott/Turley, Turley) - 2:46
12. "Revolution calling" (Turley, Turley) - 3:14
13. "Shut up yourself" (Turley, Turley) - 3:06
14. "Johnny can't hackett" (Turley, Turley) - 3:293

== Personnel ==
- Kate Turley – vocals, guitar
- Jack Turley – drums
- Matthew Vale – bass
- Scott Milner – guitar
