= Still Standing =

Still Standing may refer to:

== Music ==
=== Albums ===
- Still Standing (Goodie Mob album) or the title song, 1998
- Still Standing (Jason & the Scorchers album), 1986
- Still Standing (Monica album) or the title song (see below), 2010
- Still Standing, by Deadly Venoms, 2002
- Still Standing, by Exile, 1990
- Still Standing, by the Martins, 2018
- Still Standing, an EP by Yellowcard, 2000

=== Songs ===
- "Still Standing" (Hilltop Hoods song), 2009
- "Still Standing" (Monica song), 2008
- "Still Standing", by Kylie Minogue from Body Language, 2003
- "Still Standing", by the Rasmus from Dead Letters, 2003

== Television ==
- Still Standing (American TV series), a 2002–2006 sitcom
- Still Standing (Canadian TV series), a comedy/reality show that premiered in 2015
- Monica: Still Standing, a 2009–2010 American reality series
- "Still Standing" (Fear the Walking Dead), an episode

== Literature ==
- I'm Still Standing (book), a 2012 autobiography by Fabrice Muamba
- Invincible – Still Standing, a comic book by Robert Kirkman
- "Still Standing", a storyline in the science fiction comedy webtoon series Live with Yourself!

== See also ==
- "I'm Still Standing", a 1983 song by Elton John
- Still Standing Up, a 1997 EP by the Bruisers
- Standing Still (disambiguation)
- Who's Still Standing?, an American adaptation of the Israeli game show La'uf al HaMillion
