= Headspace =

Headspace may refer to:

== Science and technology ==
- Headspace gas chromatography, a technique in analytical chemistry
- Headspace or ullage, the unfilled space in a container
- Headspace technology, the gaseous constituents of a closed space above liquids or solid emitting and vapors measured using headspace gas chromatography
- Headspace (firearms), a chamber measurement
- Headroom (photographic framing), a concept of aesthetic composition in imaging
- Headspace (firearms) the distance measured from a closed chamber's breech face to the chamber feature that limits the insertion depth of a cartridge placed in it.

== Companies and organizations ==
- Headspace (company), an online healthcare company specializing in meditation
- Headspace (organisation), an Australian non-profit organization for youth mental health

== Culture ==
- Headspace (slang), a term for mental world shared between multiple identities within the multiplicity (also called plurality) subculture

== Arts and entertainment ==
=== Music ===
- Headspace (band), a British progressive metal band formed in 2006
- Headspace (Ashton Nyte album), 2005
- Headspace (Issues album), 2016
- Headspace (Pulse Ultra album), 2002
- "Headspace", a song by Lewis Capaldi from Divinely Uninspired to a Hellish Extent, 2019
- "Headspace", a song by Sharon Van Etten from We've Been Going About This All Wrong, 2022
- "Headspace", a song by Velvet Revolver from Contraband, 2004

=== Other media ===
- Headspace (film), a 2005 horror film
- "Headspace" (Ted Lasso), a 2021 TV episode
- Head-Space, a 2016 graphic novel
