= The Fight (band) =

UK punk rock group

- Origin: Dudley, West Midlands, England
- Genres: Pop punk
- Years active: 2000–2009
- Label: Repossession Records
- Members: Kate Turley; Jack Turley; Scott Milner; Tom Calder
- Past members: Matt Vale; Simon Jeffries; Martin Adams

The Fight was an English pop punk band, founded in 2000 in Dudley, West Midlands, England. The band consisted of singer and guitarist Kate "K8" Turley (formerly in the band 21st Century Girls), drummer Jack Turley (her younger brother), Scott Milner also on guitar and bassist Tom Calder.

In 2002, New Found Glory's road crew overheard them busking outside a gig in Leicester. When New Found Glory's guitarist, Chad Gilbert, heard their record he invited them to open for them in London and took their demo back to his label. They were signed by Fat Wreck Chords who put out their first EP, Home Is Where the Hate Is, in 2003. Their first album Nothing New Since Rock 'n' Roll was released in 2004 on Repossession Records.

The Fight have toured the UK, Japan and the United States with bands such as Rancid, Yellowcard, Sugarcult, Brand New and the Starting Line and played on the Warped Tour in summer 2005. After performing with the Fight, Kate Turley and Tom Calder formed the production duo TC4.

== Discography ==
=== Albums/EPs ===
- Home Is Where the Hate Is (EP) (2003), Fat Wreck Chords
- Nothing New Since Rock 'n' Roll (2004), Repossession Records

=== Singles ===
- "Revolution Calling"
- "Can't Be Bothered"

== Music videos ==
- "Revolution Calling" (2004)
- "Can't Be Bothered" (2004)

== Band members ==
- Kate Turley – vocals, guitar
- Jack Turley – drums
- Tom Calder – bass
- Scott Milner – guitar

Past members

- Matthew Vale – bass
- Simon Lincoln Jefferies – guitar
