= Robby Starbuck =

American activist and music video director

- Born: Robert Starbuck Newsom; February 27, 1989 (age 37); Los Angeles County, California, U.S.
- Occupations: Music video director, activist
- Years active: 2008–present
- Political party: Republican
- Movement: Opposition to diversity, equity, and inclusion
- Spouse: Landon Starbuck
- Children: 4

Robby Starbuck (born Robert Starbuck Newsom, February 27, 1989) is an American conservative social media activist and former music video director, and documentary filmmaker. As a music video director, he worked with artists including Akon, The Smashing Pumpkins, and Yellowcard. He is a critic of corporate policies that support diversity, equity, and inclusion.

== Early life ==
Robby was raised by his mother and grandparents, who had fled Cuba in the 1960s. He grew up in a Catholic household.

== Career ==
Starbuck directed music videos and commercials in California before moving to Williamson County, Tennessee in 2019. He then began investing in real estate and the stock market.

Starbuck said he received pushback in Hollywood for identifying as Republican and posting about his beliefs on social media. During the COVID-19 pandemic, he campaigned against mask and vaccine mandates. In 2021, Starbuck declared his candidacy for the Republican nomination to represent Tennessee's 5th congressional district. The Tennessee Republican Party removed him from the 2022 primary ballot, a decision upheld by the Tennessee Supreme Court. Starbuck instead ran as a write-in candidate, but did not win the nomination.

In June 2023, a photo agency issued a legal warning to Starbuck after he used a copyrighted paparazzi photo of actress Megan Fox and her family in a social media post which accused the actress of "child abuse" for allegedly forcing her children to wear girls' clothes. Megan Fox responded to Starbuck's post by saying "I really don't want to give you this attention because clearly you're a clout chaser ... But let me teach you something ... never use children as leverage or social currency. Especially under malevolent and erroneous pretense. Exploiting my child's gender identity to gain attention in your political campaign has put you on the wrong side of the universe."

=== The War on Children ===
Starbuck's documentary The War on Children, which streamed on X (formerly Twitter) in February 2024, opposes gender-affirming care. The documentary contains interviews with Riley Gaines, Chaya Raichik of Libs of TikTok, and US Senator Rand Paul, among others. The film's website tagline states that it "exposes the WAR that's being waged on children today through gender ideology, ESG, CRT, sexualization of entertainment, sex trafficking, online exploitation, TikTok, Big Pharma and more". The film promotes the conspiracy theory that toxic chemicals are responsible for causing children to identify as LGBTQ+. News outlets described the film as "anti-trans" and "anti-LGBTQ+".

Elon Musk promoted the trailer, which then received over 30 million views. He also recommended the film. A group planned to screen the film at a movie theater in Vernon, British Columbia, but another local group lobbied the theater to cancel the screening due to concerns about the film harming marginalized people and potentially violating the Human Rights Code of British Columbia. In Ottawa County, Michigan, a commissioner promoted the film during a public meeting, which may have been against county policy.

=== Anti-DEI activism ===
In June 2024, Starbuck began campaigning on social media against companies unpopular with conservatives because of their DEI initiatives, support for LGBTQ+ events, climate change strategies, and related corporate policies. Starbuck focused on brands that implemented these programs in recent years and which he saw as less likely to resist pressure. His employees helped him research the companies' policies and their executives' backgrounds. He targeted one company at a time, posting dozens of times over the course of weeks urging his followers to protest with their voices and wallets. Tractor Supply was the first company to roll back their initiatives within that same month. John Deere announced that it would no longer sponsor "social or cultural awareness" events and would audit all its training materials in July. In August, Harley-Davidson, Brown-Forman, Lowe's, and Ford Motor Company rolled back several of their DEI initiatives and ended their respective relationships with Human Rights Campaign. In September 2024, Molson Coors and Caterpillar Inc. did the same. In October 2024, Toyota followed suit. In November 2024, Boeing Co. and Walmart rolled back their DEI initiatives after being targeted by Starbuck. The New York Times commented that "Robby Starbuck may have scored his biggest win" to date with his successful pressure campaign against Walmart. In December 2024, Nissan scaled back its DEI policies following a pressure campaign by Starbuck. In January 2025, McDonald's and Target rolled back some of their DEI policies after being targeted by Starbuck.

A CNN review showed that most of the companies that altered their policies against Starbuck's pressure were making "performative tweaks". Ford retained several of its DEI policies while the changes at John Deere were not as sweeping as Starbuck stated. Walmart continued to focus on expanding opportunities for underrepresented suppliers.

=== Lawsuits against Meta Platforms and Google ===
In April 2025, Starbuck sued the company Meta Platforms, seeking over $5 million in damages. The lawsuit regarded, among other things, an allegation that an AI chatbot created by Meta had claimed Starbuck participated in the January 6 United States Capitol attack. After the lawsuit was filed, Meta apologized and partially blacklisted his name from the AI's responses. In August 2025, as part of a settlement, Meta hired Starbuck as an advisor to address "ideological and political bias" within the company's AI chatbot.

In October 2025, Starbuck sued Google, asserting that its AI tool defamed him by inaccurately connecting him to sexual assault allegations and a white nationalist.

== Personal life ==
He is married to Landon Starbuck, a musician who performed under the name of Matriarch. They have four children.

He is a non-denominational Christian.

== Filmography ==
=== DVD music ===
- 2010 – Silverstein – Decade (Live at the El Mocambo)

=== Music videos ===
- 2008 – A Skylit Drive – This Isn't the End
- 2009 – And Then There Were None – Reinventing Robert Cohn
- 2009 – Asking Alexandria – Final Episode (Let's Change the Channel)
- 2010 – Asking Alexandria – A Prophecy
- 2010 – August Burns Red – Mariana's Trench
- 2010 – Blood on the Dance Floor – Believe
- 2010 – Fight Fair – Pop Rocks
- 2010 – Pierce the Veil – Caraphernelia
- 2010 – Seasons After – Cry Little Sister
- 2010 – The Dangerous Summer – Where I Want to Be
- 2011 – Pop Evil – Monster You Made
- 2011 – The Smashing Pumpkins – Owata
- 2012 – Blessed by a Broken Heart – Rockin' All Night
- 2012 – Jeffree Star – Prom Night!
- 2012 – Yellowcard – Always Summer
- 2013 – Akon – One in the Chamber
- 2013 – Eve feat. Gabe Saporta – Make It Out This Town

=== Documentaries ===
- 2024 – The War on Children

=== Bibliography ===
- 2026 – Your Truth; The Truth: Why Wokeness Demands Everything—and Forgives Nothing (forthcoming) [citation needed]
