= Standing Still =

Standing Still may refer to:

- "Standing Still" (Jewel song), 2001
- "Standing Still" (Roman Lob song), 2012
- Standing Still (film), a 2005 film starring Amy Adams

== See also ==
- Still Standing (disambiguation)
