= Bedroom Posters =

2026 single by Yellowcard

Single by Yellowcard

from the album Better Days
- Released: August 15, 2025
- Recorded: 2024
- Studio: The Waiting Room (Calabasas, California)
- Genre: Pop-punk
- Length: 2:53
- Label: Better Noise
- Producer: Travis Barker

Yellowcard singles chronology
"Take What You Want" (2025)	"Bedroom Posters" (2025)	"You Broke Me Too" (2025)

"Bedroom Posters" is a song written and recorded by American rock band Yellowcard for their eleventh studio album Better Days. On January 15, 2026, Yellowcard released a new version of the song featuring Joel Madden of Good Charlotte. It was released as the second single from Better Days. On May 1, 2026, the song reached number one on the Billboard Alternative Airplay chart, making it their second number-one song on any chart, with "Better Days" being the first, both of which came from the Better Days album.

== Charts ==
Weekly chart performance for "Bedroom Posters"
Chart (2026)	Peak position
Canada Modern Rock (Billboard Canada)	39
US Rock & Alternative Airplay (Billboard)	16
US Alternative Airplay (Billboard)	1
