= Light Up the Sky (Yellowcard song) =

Single by Yellowcard

from the album Paper Walls
- Released: June 5, 2007
- Recorded: October 2006–March 2007
- Genre: Alternative rock, pop punk
- Length: 3:37
- Label: Capitol
- Songwriters: Ryan Key, Ryan Mendez, Peter Mosely, Longineu W. Parsons III, Sean Mackin
- Producer: Neal Avron

Yellowcard singles chronology
"Rough Landing, Holly" (2006)	"Light Up the Sky" (2007)	"For You, and Your Denial" (2011)

"Light Up the Sky" is a song written and recorded by the American rock band Yellowcard. The song was the lone single released from the band's sixth studio album Paper Walls (2007). The live acoustic version was first heard on March 30, 2007, at their concert at the Troubador in West Hollywood, California. It was then played electric in later shows. On May 15, 2007, the fully mixed album version was put on their Myspace page. The song impacted radio on June 5, 2007. It was released on iTunes on June 5, 2007, and it was the most added single to US Alternative/Modern Rock radio stations for the week ending June 8, 2007, and peaked at number 41 on the Billboard Modern Rock Tracks chart. The song also reached number 32 on the Adult Top 40 chart.

== Music video ==
The video, directed by Lisa Mann, premiered on Yahoo! Music on July 10, 2007. It shows the band playing in a dark abandoned wasteland. However, as the song continues, an orange rain starts and makes the sky above bright for people who live in the gloomy world, bringing life into something that was once desolate and dark.

== Charts ==
Chart (2007)	Peak position
US Adult Pop Airplay (Billboard)	32
US Alternative Airplay (Billboard)	41

== Release History ==
Region	Date	Format	Label	Ref.
United States	June 4, 2007	Alternative radio	Capitol	
United States	August 20, 2007	Hot adult contemporary radio	Capitol	
