= For You, and Your Denial =

"For You, And Your Denial"

Single by Yellowcard

from the album When You're Through Thinking, Say Yes
- Released: January 18, 2011
- Recorded: September 20–November 8, 2010
- Genre: Pop punk
- Length: 3:33
- Label: Hopeless
- Songwriters: Ryan Key, Ryan Mendez, Sean O'Donnell, Longineu W. Parsons III, Sean Mackin
- Producer: Neal Avron

Yellowcard singles chronology
"Light Up the Sky" (2007)	"For You, And Your Denial" (2011)	"Hang You Up" (2011)

"For You, And Your Denial" is the first single from Yellowcard's seventh album When You're Through Thinking, Say Yes, released via iTunes on January 18, 2011. The song was the first to debut live from the new album, as the band debuted the song on their show at the Glass House in Pomona, California, on November 13, 2010, the band's first live show since reforming after the 2008–2010 hiatus.

The song was released as a digital single on iTunes on January 18, 2011. It is the band's first single in almost 4 years, the last one being "Light Up the Sky" in 2007. It debuted at #100 on the Billboard Hot 100. A music video for the song was filmed on January 22, 2011 and premiered on February 22, 2011.

== Chart performance ==
"For You, And Your Denial" debuted at number 100 on the U.S. Billboard Hot 100 chart for the chart week ending February 5, 2011.

Chart (2011)	Peak position
US Billboard Hot 100	100
US Rock Digital Songs (Billboard)	10
