= Always Summer =

Single by Yellowcard

from the album Southern Air
- Released: May 22, 2012
- Genre: Pop punk
- Length: 3:08
- Label: Hopeless
- Songwriters: Ryan Key, Ryan Mendez, Longineu W. Parsons III, Sean Mackin
- Producer: Neal Avron

Yellowcard singles chronology
"Hang You Up" (2011)	"Always Summer" (2012)	"Here I Am Alive" (2012)

"Always Summer" is the first single from the American rock band Yellowcard's eighth studio album Southern Air. The album was released on August 14, 2012. The song premiered May 21, 2012, on AbsolutePunk at 8:00 PM EST. The site received enough viewers to crash it for about fifteen minutes. AbsolutePunk also said that the premiere drew more visitors to the site than any other time over the past two years. The song was then made available for purchase on iTunes and Amazon the next day. It has received positive reviews. The music video, directed by Robby Starbuck, was released on June 20, 2012. It is the first video to feature new bassist Josh Portman.

== Chart performance ==
Chart (2012)	Peak position
US Rock Digital Songs (Billboard)	29
US Alternative Digital Songs (Billboard)	17
