= Hang You Up =

Single by Yellowcard

from the album When You're Through Thinking, Say Yes
- Released: February 22, 2011
- Recorded: September 20–November 8, 2010
- Genre: Pop rock; alternative rock
- Length: 4:02; 4:11 (Music video edit)
- Label: Hopeless
- Songwriter(s): Ryan Key, Ryan Mendez, Sean O'Donnell, Longineu W. Parsons III, Sean Mackin
- Producer(s): Neal Avron

Yellowcard singles chronology
"For You, and Your Denial" (2011)	"Hang You Up" (2011)	"Always Summer" (2012)

"Hang You Up" is a song by American rock band Yellowcard, released on February 22, 2011, as the second single from their seventh studio album When You're Through Thinking, Say Yes. The song was originally written by lead singer Ryan Key for the side project Big If, a project in which he was involved in 2008–2010, while Yellowcard was on a hiatus.

== Music video ==
A music video was filmed in January and premiered on MTV.com on April 5, 2011.

The song features the band's frontman Ryan Key walking as he sings "Hang You Up". He stops to tie his shoelace, and his singing disturbs a man who is on his phone. He enters his workplace (a diner called Angelo's Hamburgers), where he drinks from a customer's beverage while singing and looking at a picture of his ex-girlfriend. He enters his station where he serves customers at the drive-through area, where a customer, while ordering through the talkbox, is cut off by Key's singing. He then spots his ex-girlfriend outside and goes out to see her. As he sings to her, she reminds him that she was granted a court order that prevents Key from singing to her within five hundred feet. As she leaves with her friend (who is shown to be attracted to Key), he walks away and goes to the parking lot where the band is playing, he picks up an acoustic guitar, and the band plays the song together in the parking lot. As the song ends, the woman who accompanied Key's ex-girlfriend gives Key her cell phone number, remarking "you can sing me a pre-chorus anytime", a reference to something than Key's ex-girlfriend said earlier (Key can then be seen raising one of his eyebrows as the woman leaves). The video ends with the man on his cell-phone from earlier who is finally left undisturbed by Key and the band.

== Chart performance ==
Chart (2011)	Peak position
US Rock Digital Songs (Billboard)	30
