= Southern Air (album) =

Studio album by Yellowcard
- Released: August 14, 2012
- Recorded: March–April 2012
- Studios: East West Recording, The Casita
- Genre: Pop punk
- Length: 39:24
- Label: Hopeless
- Producer: Neal Avron

Yellowcard chronology
When You're Through Thinking, Say Yes (2011)	Southern Air (2012)	Ocean Avenue Acoustic (2013)

Singles from Southern Air
- 1. "Always Summer" Released: May 22, 2012; 2. "Here I Am Alive" Released: July 17, 2012

Southern Air is the eighth studio album by American rock band Yellowcard. It was released on August 14, 2012 through Hopeless Records. The songs "Always Summer" and "Here I Am Alive", were released as singles, the latter featuring Taylor Jardine of We Are the In Crowd. The album also features guest appearances by Alex Gaskarth of All Time Low and American recording artist Cassadee Pope. It debuted at #10 on the US Billboard 200, their highest-charting appearance since Lights and Sounds debuted at #5 in 2006. It is the last studio album to feature founding drummer Longineu W. Parsons III.

== Background and recording ==
Yellowcard began writing and recording early in 2012, shortly after the touring cycle for When You're Through Thinking, Say Yes (2011). The overall positive energy the band had generated was inspiration to begin writing again. On February 3, it was announced that bassist Sean O'Donnell left the band to focus on his upcoming family. On February 10, Ryan Key posted that they were demoing new material. On February 17, Josh Portman was announced as the new bass player. Three days later, the band posted a studio update video. On March 2, it was announced that they had finished demoing. Following an appearance at Musink festival, the band began recording their next album on March 5. Sessions were held at East West Recording Studios, and The Casita, with producer Neal Avron. Him and Erich Talaba handled recording; they were assisted by Brendan Dekora at East West. Avron mixed the recordings with assistance from Nicolas Fournier, before Ted Jensen mastered the album at Sterling Sound. On March 29, All Time Low vocalist Alex Gaskarth recorded guest vocals. On April 8, the band announced they had finished recording. Other Guest vocalists on the album include Cassadee Pope of Hey Monday and Tay Jardine of We Are the In Crowd.

== Release ==
"Always Summer" was released as a single on May 22, 2012. The following day, a lyric video was released for the track. At the end of May, the band were filming a music video for the song. On June 12, Southern Air was announced for release in August. In addition, the album's track listing and artwork were revealed. The music video for "Always Summer" was posted online on June 20. On July 11, "Awakening" was made available for streaming. "Here I Am Alive" was made available for streaming on July 30. "Here I Am Alive" was released July 31 as the second single. On August 1, a lyric video was released for the song.

Southern Air was made available for streaming on August 7, before being released on August 14 through Hopeless Records. On the same day, a music video for "Here I Am Alive" premiered on MTV. In November and December, the band went on a headlining tour of the US with support from The Wonder Years and We Are the In Crowd. On December 10, a music video was released for "Awakening". In January 2013, the band went on a co-headlining North America tour with All Time Low. Following this, the band went on European tour with support from the Blackout, Set It Off and Like Torches.

== Reception ==
Professional ratings
Aggregate scores
Source	Rating
Metacritic	83/100
Sputnikmusic	4/5 stars
Review scores
Source	Rating
AbsolutePunk	95%
AllMusic	4/5 stars
Alter the Press!	5/5 stars
Melodic	3/5 stars

Reception to the album has been positive. Most reviewers have commented on the bands maturity of their musicianship, and the strong lyrical content. At Metacritic, which assigns an average rating out of 100 from mainstream critics, Southern Air received a score of 83, indicating universal acclaim. In addition, Thomas Nassiff at AbsolutePunk.net lauded that the album "is the best pop-punk album of 2012, and it’s a veteran band putting on a clinic for everyone to listen." Alter The Press named Southern Air the best album of 2012, citing that "the band have poured their hearts into Southern Air and there is a tangible sense of passion behind each track."

The album debuted at #10 on the Billboard 200 chart, with first week sales of 23,000 copies in the United States, making it their second-highest debut, behind their 2006 release, Lights and Sounds, which peaked at #5.

== Track listing ==
All lyrics are written by Ryan Key except where noted; all music is composed by Key, Sean Mackin, Ryan Mendez, and Longineu W. Parsons III except where noted.

No.	Title	Length
1.	"Awakening"	4:24
2.	"Surface of the Sun"	3:44
3.	"Always Summer"	3:10
4.	"Here I Am Alive" (feat. Taylor Jardine, lyrics written by Ryan Key and Patrick Stump)	3:33
5.	"Sleep in the Snow"	4:03
6.	"A Vicious Kind"	3:53
7.	"Telescope"	3:53
8.	"Rivertown Blues"	3:34
9.	"Ten"	4:47
10.	"Southern Air"	4:23
Total length:		39:24

iTunes bonus track
No.	Title	Length
11.	"Fix You" (written by Chris Martin, Jonny Buckland, Guy Berryman, and Will Champion; originally performed by Coldplay)	4:49

Japanese bonus tracks
No.	Title	Length
11.	"Always Summer (Acoustic)"	3:15
12.	"Telescope (Acoustic)"	3:58

== Personnel ==
Personnel per booklet.

Yellowcard

- Ryan Key – lead vocals, guitar
- Sean Mackin – violin, backing vocals, string arrangements, mandolin (track 7)
- Longineu W. Parsons III – drums
- Ryan Mendez – guitar, bass
- Josh Portman – bass

Additional musicians

- Rodney Wirtz – viola
- Christine Lightner – cello
- Tay Jardine – additional vocals (tracks 4 and 7)
- Alex Gaskarth – additional vocals (track 7)
- Cassadee Pope – additional vocals (track 7)
- David Immerglück – pedal steel guitar (track 9), mandolin (track 9)
- Georg Egloff – piano (track 5)
- Neal Avron – programming

Production and design

- Neal Avron – producer, mixing, recording
- Erich Talaba – recording
- Brendan Dekora – assistant engineer
- Nicolas Fournier – mix assistant
- Ted Jensen – mastering
- Brian Manley – design, photography

== Chart performance ==
Chart (2012)	Peak position
Australian Albums (ARIA)	30
Austrian Albums (Ö3 Austria)	75
Belgian Albums (Ultratop Flanders)	142
German Albums (Offizielle Top 100)	91
Japanese Top Album Sales (Billboard Japan)	48
Scottish Albums (Official Charts)	62
UK Albums (Official Charts)	60
UK Album Downloads (Official Charts)	58
UK Independent Albums (Official Charts)	6
UK Rock & Metal Albums (Official Charts)	5
US Billboard 200	10
US Billboard Rock Albums	2
US Billboard Alternative Albums	2
US Billboard Independent Albums	2
US Billboard Vinyl Albums	2
