= Headspace (Pulse Ultra album) =

Studio album by Pulse Ultra
- Released: July 16, 2002
- Recorded: November – December 2001 at Cello Studios in Hollywood, California
- Genre: Alternative metal, progressive metal, nu metal
- Length: 49:06
- Label: Atlantic
- Producer: Neal Avron

Professional ratings
Review scores
Source	Rating
Allmusic	2/5 stars

Headspace is the only album from the Canadian group Pulse Ultra. The album was released on July 16, 2002, via Atlantic Records. A music video was made for the single "Build your Cages".

== Music and lyrics ==
The opening track "Acceptance (Phase I)" has lyrics that mirror the aftermath of the September 11 terrorist attacks, and it includes the line "don't you see the skyscrapers? They're too big to bring down alone". However, the song was supposedly written before these events occurred, even though the album itself started being recorded shortly after the attacks.

== Reception ==
CMJ New Music Report wrote in 2002, "Founded in Montreal in 1997, Pulse Ultra is an aggressive, yet melodic rock band that interestingly toys with prog à la Tool, but never loses focus on keeping its songs short and to the point. "Build Your Cages", the album's first official single, will please anyone who got off on the moody industrial tinges of A Perfect Circle's "Thinking of You", while "Glass Door" is a full-throttle rocker in the style of Ultraspank."

== Track listing ==
1. "Acceptance (Phase I)" – 2:55
2. "Finding My Place (Phase II)" – 3:47
3. "Put It Off" – 3:39
4. "Big Brother" (featuring Stephen Richards) – 3:21
5. "Never the Culprit" – 4:06
6. "Slip in Sin" – 5:02
7. "Prelude" – 1:10
8. "Void" – 4:01
9. "Build Your Cages" – 3:54
10. "Tired" – 3:24
11. "Interlude" – 1:23
12. "Look Closer" – 3:52
13. "Glass Door" – 3:38
14. "Despot" – 4:49
15. "A Different Hell" – 4:12 (Japan-exclusive bonus track)

== Personnel ==
=== Pulse Ultra ===
- Zo Vizza – lead vocals
- Jeff Feldman – bass guitar
- Maxx Zinno – drums
- Dominic Cifarelli – lead guitar

Additional personnel

- Neal Avron – producer
- Chris Lord-Alge – mixing
- Stephen Richards of Taproot - Guest vocals in "Big Brother".
