= When You're Through Thinking, Say Yes =

Studio album by Yellowcard
- Released: March 22, 2011
- Recorded: October–November, 2010
- Studios: Sunset Sound, The Casita
- Genre: Pop punk
- Length: 37:09
- Label: Hopeless
- Producer: Neal Avron

Yellowcard chronology
Paper Walls (2007)	When You're Through Thinking, Say Yes (2011)	Southern Air (2012)

Singles from When You're Through Thinking, Say Yes
- 1. "For You, and Your Denial" Released: January 18, 2011; 2. "Hang You Up" Released: February 22, 2011

When You're Through Thinking, Say Yes is the seventh studio album released by American rock band Yellowcard on March 22, 2011 under Hopeless Records. The album has received positive reviews. The album's title comes from a text message sent to a girl by lead singer Ryan Key.

Later in the year, the band released an acoustic version of the album.

== Background and recording ==
In July 2010, rumours surfaced that Yellowcard, who had been on a two-year hiatus, would be reforming. In August, Yellowcard announced they would be returning from their hiatus and would be working on a new album for independent label Hopeless Records. Following the band's reformation, they immediately began working on their new album. Ryan Key, who had previously been in a small project with Reeve Oliver vocalist/guitarist Sean O'Donnell (who was chosen as Pete Mosely's replacement after he declined to return) called "Big If", confirmed that some of Big If's songs were going to be reworked by Yellowcard and included on the new album.

Sessions for When You're Through Thinking, Say Yes were held at Sunset Sound and The Casita, both in Hollywood, California, in October and November 2010, with producer Neal Avron. He handled recording with engineer and Pro Tools operator Erich Talaba; they were assisted by Morgan Stratton at Sunset. Avron mixed the recordings at Paramount Recording Studios in Hollywood, with assistance from Nicolas Fournier. Ted Jensen mastered the album at Sterling Sound. While in the studio, they released a number of video updates. Some of the studio updates were shown originally on Rock Sound magazine's website.

== Release ==
On November 15, 2010, the group revealed that their new album would be titled When You're Through Thinking, Say Yes. In addition, a video was posted online of the group playing a new track titled "For You, and Your Denial". On December 9, the album's artwork was revealed. Four days later, it was revealed that the album would be released in March. On January 6, 2011, the album's track listing was posted online. "For You, and Your Denial" was made available for streaming on January 18. On February 8, "Hang You Up" was made available for streaming. Preceded by two teaser trailers, a music video was released for "For You, and Your Denial" on February 22. When You're Through Thinking, Say Yes was released on March 22 through Hopeless Records. In March, the band went on a UK tour alongside All Time Low and Young Guns. From late March to early May, the band supported All Time Low on their US tour.

On April 5, a music video was released for "Hang You Up". In June, the band went on a co-headlining tour of the US with Good Charlotte. They were supported by Runner Runner. In late September and early October, the band toured Australia as part of the Soundwave Counter-Revolution festival. In October and November, the group went on their first headlining tour of the US in three years. They were supported by Every Avenue and Go Radio. On October 23, an acoustic version of the album was made available for streaming, and was released the following day. It was recorded and produced by Mendez and Key. On October 25, a music video for "Sing for Me" debuted on MTV. A behind-the-scenes video was also released. Music videos were released for the acoustic versions of "See Me Smiling" and "Be the Young", on November 7 and 15, respectively. In November and December, the band performed a few co-headlining shows with Saves the Day in the UK and Europe.

== Critical reception ==
Professional ratings
Review scores
Source	Rating
AbsolutePunk	89%
AllMusic	3/5 stars
Alternative Press	4/5 stars
BLARE	4/5 stars
Drowned in Sound	4/10 stars
Rock on Request	(favorable)
Rock Sound	8/10
Sputnikmusic	4/5

Reception to When You're Through Thinking, Say Yes was mainly positive. AbsolutePunk reviewer Thomas Nassiff summarized the reunion album as "a holistic recap of the band's career that still shows good progression" and "one very important thing: Yellowcard is back, and they're back for good". Jared Ponton of Sputnikmusic, in his review giving the album 4 out of 5 stars, explained, "The record bleeds with the best that Yellowcard have done thus far, yet in a fresh context, bursting with newfound energy after a short hiatus that, in hindsight, was certainly needed." Allmusic reviewer Gregory Heaney, who gave the album one of its lowest critical ratings at 3 out of 5 stars, published a more mixed review, while remarking on the band's progression away from catchy violin-driven melodies and toward music focused on the songwriting's impact.

== Track listing ==
All lyrics are written by Ryan Key; all music is composed by Yellowcard.

No.	Title	Length
1.	"The Sound of You and Me"	4:36
2.	"For You, and Your Denial"	3:33
3.	"With You Around"	3:01
4.	"Hang You Up"	4:02
5.	"Life of Leaving Home"	3:24
6.	"Hide"	3:12
7.	"Soundtrack"	3:35
8.	"Sing for Me"	3:54
9.	"See Me Smiling"	3:50
10.	"Be the Young"	3:56
Total length:		37:03

iTunes bonus track
No.	Title	Length
11.	"Sing for Me" (acoustic)	3:48

iTunes pre-order
No.	Title	Length
12.	"Promises"	3:39

Japanese bonus track
No.	Title	Length
11.	"Life of Leaving Home" (acoustic)	3:30

== Personnel ==
Personnel per booklet.

Yellowcard

- Ryan Key – lead vocals, guitar
- Sean Mackin – violin, backing vocals
- Ryan Mendez – guitar
- Sean O'Donnell – bass
- Longineu W. Parsons III – drums

Additional musicians

- Neal Avron – programming, synthesizer
- Rodney Wirtz – viola
- Ira Glansbeek – cello

Production and design

- Neal Avron – producer, mixing, recording
- Erich Talaba – engineer, Pro Tools
- Morgan Stratton – assistant engineer
- Nicolas Fournier – mixing assistant
- Ted Jensen – mastering
- Brian Manley – design, cover photos

== Charts ==
Chart performance for When You're Through Thinking, Say Yes
Chart (2011)	Peak position
Australian Albums (ARIA)	41
Canadian Albums (Nielsen SoundScan)	42
Japanese Top Album Sales (Billboard Japan)	44
UK Albums (Official Charts)	84
UK Independent Albums (Official Charts)	11
UK Rock & Metal Albums (Official Charts)	4
US Billboard 200	19
US Independent Albums (Billboard)	2
US Top Alternative Albums (Billboard)	5
US Top Rock Albums (Billboard)	5
