= Paper Walls =

Studio album by Yellowcard
- Released: July 17, 2007
- Recorded: January 2 – March 22, 2007
- Studios: Ocean, Burbank, California
- Genre: Pop punk
- Length: 47:45
- Label: Capitol
- Producer: Neal Avron

Yellowcard chronology
Lights and Sounds (2006)	Paper Walls (2007)	When You're Through Thinking, Say Yes (2011)

Singles from Paper Walls
- 1. "Light Up the Sky" Released: June 5, 2007

Paper Walls is the sixth studio album by American rock band Yellowcard, released on July 17, 2007. This is also the first Yellowcard album with Ryan Mendez, their last with Peter Mosely, and their last studio album to be released through Capitol Records. The album was recorded at Ocean Studios in Burbank, California and was mixed at South Beach Studios in Miami, Florida.

== Background and production ==
Prior to the release of Lights and Sounds (2006), it was announced that guitarist Ben Harper had parted ways with the band. He was replaced by Ryan Mendez. Lights and Sounds failed to reach sales expectations compared to their break-through album Ocean Avenue (2003). Violinist Sean Mackin called the group "a little too jaded" and Lights and Sounds "a little too dark ... We all went a bit too far." Mackin insisted that the band did not see the album as a mistake, but more of a "learning experience". On October 16, 2006, the band announced over their official website that they were back in the studio doing pre-production.

On January 2, 2007, the band announced they had begun recording a new album. Sessions were held at Ocean Studios in Burbank, California, with producer Neal Avron, who also handled recording. Erich Talaba did additional engineering, with assistance from Bret Rausch and Bryce Iverson. Tom Lord-Alge mixed the recordings, with assistance from Femio Hernandez, at South Beach Studios in Miami, Florida, before they were mastered by Ted Jensen at Sterling Sound. Prior to the album's release, the group released 10 behind-the-scenes videos documenting the recording process via their Myspace profile.

== Composition ==
Shortly after the album's leak and release date, the songs "Shadows and Regrets" and "Five Becomes Four" were first believed to have been written about former guitarist Ben Harper, who left the band to focus on his record label, after recording Lights and Sounds last year. However, recently it has been said that "Shadows and Regrets" is about Scott Shad, former drummer of Inspection 12 and best friend of Ryan Key, who died in a car crash. The song seems to reflect this interpretation better, as the chorus states "We were only kids. And we were best of friends. And we hoped for the best. Let go of the rest." While this could understandably be about Ben Harper, he and Key only met in high school, whereas Key and Shad knew each other their entire lives.

Throughout the months of October 2006 to March 2007, Yellowcard engaged in feedback response with their fans to somewhat suggest or influence the outcome of the upcoming album. When asked about the direction of the album, Ryan Mendez responded that this follow-up to Lights and Sounds "has the energy and intensity that Ocean Avenue had and some similarities, but not necessarily exactly the same". He also stated on the official Yellowcard message board on October 21, 2006 that three songs were currently completed and that "[he] really thinks fans of both older and newer Yellowcard are going to be very happy."

In an interview with Jason Tate of AbsolutePunk.net released on June 17 (one month before the release of the album), vocalist Ryan Key described the album as

...very much a record of hope and finding yourself again. It’s after you’ve come through all of that – going to the height of it – and picking yourself back up again. And by “hitting rock bottom” I don’t mean in record sales or fame or any of that shit. I mean personally – emotionally...Paper Walls is the story, the feeling, of what it’s like to be out of those holes, looking back, no regrets, but smarter and having grown through them.

== Release and promotion ==
In January 2007, some sample demo songs were released on the band's MySpace, though they were only rough recordings from pre-production and not the final recorded versions. One demo was a 30-second rough recording of "Date Line (I Am Gone)". Another was the intro to "Bombers", which ultimately did not make it onto the album. The first Yellowcard show since October 2006, when the album began production, took place on March 29, 2007 at the Troubadour in Hollywood, California. During the show, Yellowcard played two songs from their new album ("Fighting" and "The Takedown"). The band played an acoustic set the next night at the Troubadour and also played two new songs, "Shadows and Regrets" and "Light Up the Sky".

In May 2007, the band appeared at The Bamboozle festival. On May 14, 2007, the band revealed that their new album would be titled Paper Walls. Alongside this, "Fighting" was made available for streaming via the band's Myspace account, followed by "Light up the Sky" the next day. On May 18, the album's track listing was revealed. On June 6, 2007, "Five Becomes Four" was posted on their Myspace. A few days later, the cover art for the album was posted on the band's MySpace profile, along with new promotional pictures. The cover art of the album shows the night skyline of Jacksonville, Florida, the band's hometown. It was announced in a press release for the album that Paper Walls would be released in an additional CD/DVD format, much in the same vein as Lights and Sounds was the previous year. "Light Up the Sky" was released to radio on June 5. From late June to mid-July, the band went on the 2007 edition of Warped Tour.

Paper Walls was made available for streaming on July 10, and released a week later through Capitol. Following this, they played a handful of shows across Japan, Australia and Canada, including a few shows in Sum 41. From late September to mid November, the group went on a tour of the U.S. with support from Ozma, Shiny Toy Guns and Lovedrug. On October 18, it was announced that bassist Peter Mosely left the group to "pursue other endeavors."

In early 2008, the band played some shows in the Middle East for US troops overseas. On January 22, 2008, the band released the live album Live From Las Vegas at the Palms exclusively through the iTunes Store. In March and April 2008, the band embarked on a headlining US tour, during which they only performed acoustically. They were supported by PlayRadioPlay!, Treaty of Paris and Secondhand Serenade. In addition, MxPx was originally scheduled to support as well, however, they had to pull out due to scheduling conflicts. As a result, the Spill Canvas took their place. On April 25, the band announced they would be going on an indefinite hiatus. Key explained that "It doesn't have anything to do with turmoil in the band. It's more of a, facing adulthood now, and we can't stay in Neverland forever. ... I think we just need a break."

== Reception ==
Professional ratings
Aggregate scores
Source	Rating
Metacritic	(62/100)
Review scores
Source	Rating
AbsolutePunk	87%
AllMusic	3.5/5 stars
Alternative Press	3/5 stars
Entertainment Weekly	(C)
IGN	7.4/10
Melodic	3/5 stars

=== Critical response ===
Paper Walls received positive reviews from critics. Jason Tate, webmaster of absolutepunk.net said it is "the best "pop-punk" album of the past 5 or so years" and Drew Beringer claims it to be "like Ocean Avenue, but with more balls." He went on further to say "The more I listen to Paper Walls by Yellowcard, the more I fall in love with it. It has been a long time since a pop-punk album has really enthralled me. Everyone is going to dig this." Allmusic was satisfied with Paper Walls and claimed "Yellowcard is neither the flashiest nor the most popular among the new millennium's pop-punk bands but their fifth album Paper Walls goes a long way in proving that they are among the best of their breed."

With positive critical reception from critics, fans enjoyed Paper Walls as well. This is shown on Metacritic with a 7.6 out of 10, indicating generally positive reviews.

=== Commercial performance ===
Following the album's release, it debuted at number 13 on the U.S. Billboard 200, selling about 40,000 copies in its first week, which is less than half of the first week sales of their previous studio album, Lights and Sounds. In its second week, Paper Walls fell to #46, selling 17,000 units. On week three it hit #70 with sales of about 10,000 copies, and on week four it fell to #92, selling 7,000 copies that week. A total of 74,000 copies were sold in the first four weeks of release.

The lead single, "Light Up the Sky", peaked at #32 on the Billboard Adult Top 40 chart in the U.S.

== Track listing ==
All lyrics by Ryan Key, except "Dear Bobbie" by Key and William Alexander Speir. All music by Yellowcard.

No.	Title	Length
1.	"The Takedown"	3:37
2.	"Fighting"	3:00
3.	"Shrink the World"	3:20
4.	"Keeper"	3:55
5.	"Light Up the Sky"	3:37
6.	"Shadows and Regrets"	3:59
7.	"Five Becomes Four"	3:30
8.	"Afraid"	3:13
9.	"Date Line (I Am Gone)"	3:22
10.	"Dear Bobbie"	4:14
11.	"You and Me and One Spotlight"	3:57
12.	"Cut Me, Mick"	3:34
13.	"Paper Walls"	4:28
Total length:		47:45

iTunes bonus tracks
No.	Title	Length
14.	"Gifts and Curses (Live & Acoustic)"	5:02
15.	"How I Go (Live & Acoustic) [featuring Katy Perry]"	4:39
16.	"Bombers"	3:28

- "Gift and Curses" (Live & Acoustic) and "How I Go" (Live & Acoustic) were made available on the deluxe DVD of the album. The studio recording of “Gifts and Curses” originally appeared on the Spider-Man 2 soundtrack in 2004, and the studio recording of "How I Go" originally appeared on the band's preceding studio album in 2006, Lights and Sounds, with Natalie Maines of The Chicks providing the guest vocals.

== Personnel ==
Personnel per booklet.

Yellowcard

- Ryan Key – lead vocals, guitar
- Sean Mackin – violin, strings and choir arrangement, backing vocals
- Ryan Mendez – lead guitar
- Peter Mosely – bass guitar, keyboards, piano
- Longineu W. Parsons III – drums

Additional musicians

- Rodney Wirtz – viola
- Christine Choi – cello

Design

- Bill McMillin – art direction, photography

Production

- Neal Avron – producer, recording
- Erich Talaba – additional engineering
- Bret Rausch – assistant engineer
- Bryce Iverson – assistant engineer
- Tom Lord-Alge – mixing
- Femio Hernandez – mix assistant
- Ted Jensen – mastering

Choir on "Paper Walls"

- Leanna Brand (contractor)
- Emme Lehmann
- Vili Lehmann
- Amy Fogerson
- Nicholas Harper
- Casey Rae Hands
- Zoë Merrill
- Daniel O'Brien
- Antonella Quintana
- Ann Marie Rizzo
- Bobbi Page
- Edie Lehmann
- Helene Quintana

== Charts ==
Chart performance for Paper Walls
Chart (2007)	Peak position
Australian Albums (ARIA)	25
Canadian Albums (Nielsen SoundScan)	20
UK Albums (OCC)	113
US Billboard 200	13
US Top Alternative Albums (Billboard)	5
US Top Rock Albums (Billboard)	6
