= Home Is Where the Hate Is =

EP by The Fight
- Released: 2003
- Genre: Punk rock
- Length: 20:13
- Label: Fat Wreck
- Producer: Bill Stevenson

Professional ratings
Review scores
Source	Rating
Alternative Press	3/5
In Music We Trust	B

Home Is Where the Hate Is is the 2003 debut EP of British punk rock band The Fight. It was produced by Bill Stevenson, and published by Fat Wreck Chords.

== Track listing ==
1. "Forgotten Generation" (Turley, Turley) - 2:15
2. "Fish Gang" (Turley, Turley) - 2:02
3. "Home is where the hate is" (Turley, Turley) - 3:26
4. "Greebo wanabe" (Turley, Turley) - 2:56
5. "(I'm running around in) circles" (Mich Walker) - 3:15
6. "Stage skool kidz" (Turley, Turley) - 3:16
7. "Revolution calling" (Turley, Turley) - 3:03

== Personnel ==
- Kate - vocals, guitar
- Matt - bass
- Jack - drums
- Simon - guitar
