= Better Days (Yellowcard album) =

Studio album by Yellowcard
- Released: October 10, 2025
- Genre: Pop-punk
- Length: 31:40
- Label: Better Noise
- Producers: Travis Barker; Andrew Goldstein; Nick Long

Yellowcard chronology
Childhood Eyes (2023)	Better Days (2025)

Singles from Better Days
- 1. "Better Days" / "Honestly I" Released: May 28, 2025; 2. "Take What You Want" Released: July 9, 2025; 3. "Bedroom Posters" Released: August 15, 2025; 4. "You Broke Me Too" Released: October 10, 2025

Singles from Better Days (Deluxe)
- 1. "Bedroom Posters (feat. Good Charlotte)" Released: January 16, 2026; 2. "Calvary Drive" Released: August 21, 2026

Professional ratings
Review scores
Source	Rating
AllMusic	4/5 stars
Distorted Sound	9/10
Ever Metal	8/10

Better Days is the eleventh studio album by American rock band Yellowcard. It was released on October 10, 2025, through Better Noise Music. It is supported by the release of the singles "Better Days", "Honestly I", "Take What You Want", and "Bedroom Posters". It is the band's first studio album following their 2022 reunion after a five year breakup. It also marks the longest gap between albums for the band following their 2016 self-titled album.

== Background ==
Yellowcard broke up after the supporting tour for the band's 2016 self-titled album. Not many details about the disbanding have been revealed, but Ryan Key has stated that, internally, the experience was very difficult for the band members.

During the five years they were broken up, many of the band members didn't speak to each other. Key began releasing music as a solo artist under his full name while also becoming the touring guitarist for New Found Glory. He also maintained a working relationship with guitarist Ryan Mendez, and the two started an electronic act called JEDHA.

In 2022, the band's longtime booking agent contacted them about performing at Riot Fest to commemorate the 20th anniversary of their 2003 album, Ocean Avenue. Key revealed that this was the most guaranteed show the band had ever received, so the band members put aside the past in order to do what they felt was best for their families. Following the success of the show, the band members began to reconcile with each other and decided they wanted to make music together again, which eventually led to their 2023 EP, Childhood Eyes. The band also booked more festival appearances that year and embarked on a full tour.

To the band's surprise, these shows would become the most successful era of their career, including sold out shows in some of the biggest venues they ever played. Key reflected on the band's newfound success in an interview with Rolling Stone, stating that he and the band had a running joke that "when the pandemic hit and the world was sort of on the brink, that maybe the world did actually end and we’re in an alternate timeline now". Eventually the band decided that it was time to record a new album.

== Recording and theming ==
Recording for Better Days began in April 2024. When approaching recording a new album, Key was nervous about the prospect due to his more recent removal from pop punk. Feeling this way, he suggested that the band bring in outside collaboration for a new record, upon which Mendez almost immediately suggested that they work with Nick Long. Mendez and Long had been longtime friends and previously played together in Staring Back before Mendez joined Yellowcard in 2005. Shortly before the band was set to enter the studio, Long pitched the idea of also working with Blink-182 drummer Travis Barker. Long and Barker were not only close friends, but frequent collaborators, having worked on multiple albums with Machine Gun Kelly, and Long cowriting multiple songs for Blink-182's 2023 album, One More Time..., so when Barker's schedule opened the day Long and Yellowcard were set to write and record, he joined them in the studio. The group wrote two songs that day, one of which was "Barely Alive", and when Barker's schedule continued to open up, it led to him not only producing the album, but playing drums on all tracks. Key and violinist Sean Mackin described Barker's production style as very relaxed and supportive of the band. Key especially highlighted Barker's support on recording the vocals, feeling that it was one of his strongest performances, but crediting Barker's support with that.

Lyrically, the album addresses themes such as interpersonal relationships, growing old and changing, and forgiveness. The album's title track tackles dealing with someone in your life that doesn't accept responsibility, but you still wish them well. "Take What You Want" was written about giving all of yourself to something, and not getting anything in return. "Love Letters Lost" was cited by Key as one of his favorite tracks on the album, primarily due to the involvement of Alkaline Trio guitarist Matt Skiba. Both Key and Mackin are big Alkaline Trio fan, so Barker brought up the idea of bringing Skiba into record with them since the two played together in Blink-182 from 2015 to 2022. "Honestly I" was written about family relationship, with Key specifically talking about the birth of his son. "You Broke Me Too" was what the band wanted for the album's big ballad, which also includes a collaboration with Avril Lavigne. "City of Angels" is a callback to the Lights and Sounds song "City of Devils". Key wrote the first song about his distaste for living in Los Angeles, while the new song sees him reflect on the things he actually enjoys about the city. "Bedroom Posters" was written about Key reflecting on leaving his family behind to start his music career, but more so in a way that didn't sound like he was writing it in his youth. It was later re-recorded featuring a collaboration with Good Charlotte's Joel Madden. "Skin Scraped" is the song that mostly discusses the band's reunion, and how each of the members have come to reconcile with each other and come back together. "Barely Alive" was the first song the band wrote for the album, and tackles where they see themselves going with the future of their band. The album ends with "Big Blue Eyes"; another song Key wrote about how being a father has had such an impact on his life.

== Release and promotion ==
On May 28, 2025, Better Days was announced for release in October. In addition, the album's track listing and artwork were revealed.

On August 21, 2026, a deluxe edition of the album was announced, and was released on September 18.

=== Singles ===
"Better Days" and "Honestly I" were released on May 28, 2025, as album's lead single and B-side, respectfully. The album's second single "Take What You Want" was released on July 9, 2025.. On January 15, 2026, a new version of Bedroom Posters featuring Good Charlotte was released. "Calvary Drive" was released on August 21, 2026.

== Track listing ==
All tracks are written by Ryan Key, Sean Mackin, Ryan Mendez, Josh Portman, and Travis Barker, with additional songwriters listed.

Better Days track listing
No.	Title	Writer(s)	Length
1.	"Better Days"	Nick Long; Taka	2:53
2.	"Take What You Want"	Andrew Goldstein; Rug	2:26
3.	"Love Letters Lost" (featuring Matt Skiba)	Skiba	3:21
4.	"Honestly I"	Long	3:06
5.	"You Broke Me Too" (featuring Avril Lavigne)	Goldstein; Rug	3:07
6.	"City of Angels"	Goldstein	3:19
7.	"Bedroom Posters"	Goldstein	3:38
8.	"Skin Scraped"		3:34
9.	"Barely Alive"	Long	3:12
10.	"Big Blue Eyes"	John Feldmann; Ravenna Golden; Nate Young	3:04
Total length:			31:40

Better Days (Deluxe)
No.	Title	Writer(s)	Length
11.	"Calvary Drive"	Long	2:45
12.	"Hell with Me" (feat. Steve Aoki)
13.	"Bedroom Posters" (feat. Good Charlotte)	Goldstein	3:38
14.	"Better Days" (Asleep Edition)

Notes

- "Honestly I" is stylized in all lowercase.

== Personnel ==
Credits adapted from the album's liner notes.

=== Yellowcard ===
- Ryan Key – lead vocals, guitar
- Sean Mackin – violin, backing vocals & mandolin
- Ryan Mendez – guitar
- Josh Portman – bass

=== Additional contributors ===
- Travis Barker – production, drums, executive production, art direction
- Adam Hawkins – mixing
- Randy Merrill – mastering
- Nick Long – co-production (1, 4, 9)
- Andrew Goldstein – co-production (2, 5–7)
- Shaan Singh – engineering (2, 5, 7)
- Eric Emery – engineering
- Erich Talaba – string engineering (1, 7, 9)
- Christine Lightner – cello (1, 7, 9)
- Rodney Wirtz – viola (1, 7, 9)
- Kevin Bivona – additional keyboards and guitar (3, 5–8, 10)
- Daniel Rojas – album cover
- Maxx242 – album cover
- Brandon Stecz – layout design
- Joe Brady – photos

== Charts ==
Chart performance for Better Days
Chart (2025)	Peak position
Australian Albums (ARIA)	56
Japanese Download Albums (Billboard Japan)	37
UK Album Downloads (Official Charts)	28
US Top Album Sales (Billboard)	31
US Top Current Album Sales (Billboard)	26
