= Pulse Ultra =

Canadian metal band

- Pulse Ultra in 2002. L–R: Jeff Feldman, Dominic Cifarelli, Zo Vizza, Maxx Zinno

Background information
- Origin: Montreal, Quebec, Canada
- Genres: Alternative metal, nu metal, progressive metal
- Years active: 1997–2004
- Label: Atlantic Records
- Members: Zo Vizza; Dominic Cifarelli; Jeff Feldman; Maxx Zinno

Pulse Ultra was a Canadian alternative metal band from Montreal, Quebec. They were active from 1997 to 2004, releasing one major label album, Headspace, through Atlantic Records in 2002.

== History ==
=== Early years (1997–2000) ===
Pulse Ultra was initially formed as Head Space in 1997 by guitarist Dominic Cifarelli and bassist Jeff Feldman. Drummer Maxx Zinno was added that same year. During the time, as Head Space, they had the vocalist Claudio Dongarra. Two years after Dongarra left the band, vocalist Zo Vizza, was added to the band and they made the name change to Pulse Ultra. Regarding the name, Cifarelli said "Everything right now is so fast-paced. Everything is ultra this, ultra that — ultra soft tissue to wipe your ass, and ultra light cigarettes to give you ultra cancer. Then pulse stands for being human, for life. So Pulse Ultra — it's like life amped up and taken to the next level."

== Members ==
- Zo Vizza – vocals
- Dominic Cifarelli – guitar (The Chronicles of Israfel, ex-Scars on Broadway)
- Jeff Feldman – bass
- Maxx Zinno – drums

== Discography ==
Album information
Headspace
- Released: July 16, 2002 (US)
- Label: Atlantic Records
- Singles: Build Your Cages
