= Better Days (Yellowcard song) =

2025 single by Yellowcard

Single by Yellowcard

from the album Better Days
- B-side: "Honestly I"
- Released: May 28, 2025
- Recorded: 2024
- Studio: The Waiting Room (Calabasas, California)
- Genre: Pop-punk
- Length: 2:53
- Label: Better Noise
- Producer: Travis Barker

Yellowcard singles chronology
"Three Minutes More" (2023)	"Better Days" / "Honestly I" (2025)	"Take What You Want" (2025)

"Better Days" is a song written and recorded by American rock band Yellowcard for their eleventh studio album of the same name. It was released as the first single from Better Days on May 28, 2025, through Better Noise Music Better Days debuted at No. 33 on the Billboard Alternative Airplay chart. On August 22, 2025, the song reached No. 1 on Alternative Airplay, making it their first number one song on any chart to date. By achieving this, the band, who first charted with "Way Away" in 2003, garnered the distinction of setting the longest gap between an artist's first appearance on that chart and their first number-one entry. Better Days remained at No. 1 for three consecutive weeks.

== Charts ==
=== Weekly charts ===
Weekly chart performance for "Better Days"
Chart (2025)	Peak position
Belarus Airplay (TopHit)	90
US Rock & Alternative Airplay (Billboard)	5
US Alternative Airplay (Billboard)	1

=== Year-end charts ===
Year-end chart performance for "Better Days"
Chart (2025)	Position
US Rock & Alternative Airplay (Billboard)	46
