= Yellowcard =

American rock band

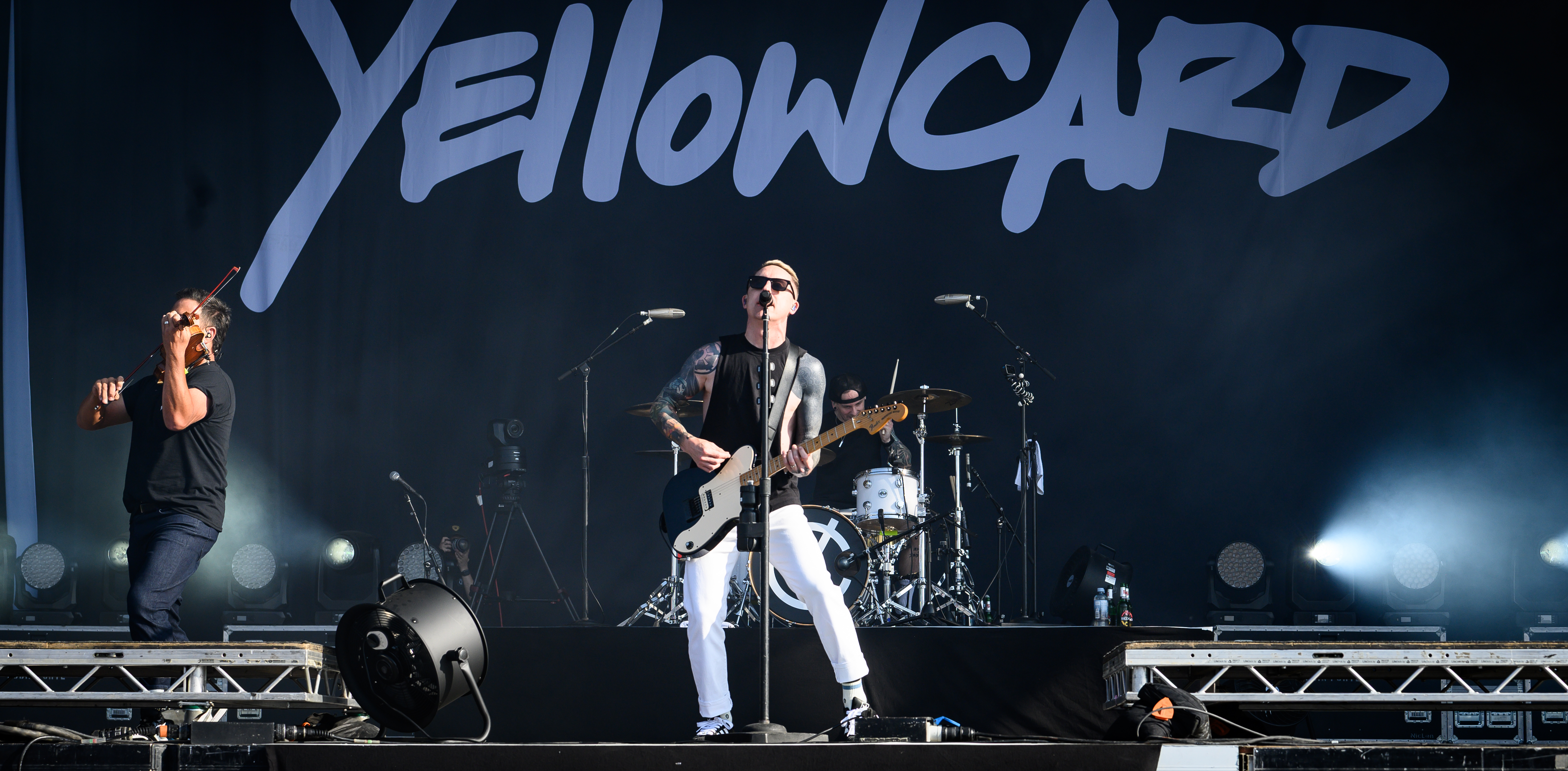
- Yellowcard performing in 2025

Background information
- Origin: Jacksonville, Florida, U.S.
- Genres: Pop-punk; punk rock; alternative rock; hardcore punk (early)
- Years active: 1997–2008; 2010–2017; 2022–present
- Labels: DIY; Takeover; Lobster; Fueled by Ramen; Capitol; Hopeless; Razor & Tie; Equal Vision; Better Noise
- Members: Ryan Key; Sean Mackin; Ryan Mendez; Josh Portman
- Past members: Ben Dobson; Todd Clary; Warren Cooke; Ben Harper; Longineu W. Parsons III; Peter Mosely; Alex Lewis; Sean O'Donnell
- Website: yellowcardband.com

Yellowcard is an American rock band who formed in Jacksonville, Florida, in 1997. Their official lineup currently consists of lead singer and rhythm guitarist Ryan Key, who was previously a guest vocalist, lead guitarist Ryan Mendez, bassist Josh Portman and violinist Sean Mackin. Mackin is the only remaining original member. Primarily a pop-punk group, the band has included various other genres of music since its inceptionto include hardcore punk, melodic hardcore punk, alternative rock, and emo-pop/punk. Yellowcard's music is recognized for having a distinct and unique sound in its genre due to their prominent use of a violin. The group's most-recognized singles include Ocean Avenue, Only One, and Lights and Sounds. Released in 2003, "Ocean Avenue" and its parent album of the same name are both certified double platinum and platinum in the US respectively by the Recording Industry Association of America (RIAA); "Only One" and the band's 2006 album Lights and Sounds have been certified gold.

During their first two decades together, the band released ten studio albums, with the last, Yellowcard, released in 2016. Following this release and supporting tour, the quartet disbanded. The band announced a reunion in May 2022 and resumed their recording and touring career, beginning with the Childhood Eyes EP, released in 2023. Their eleventh studio album Better Days followed in 2025.

== History ==
=== 1997–2002: Formation and early material ===
Yellowcard was formed in 1997 in Jacksonville, Florida, after its members met at Douglas Anderson School of the Arts. The band got its name from a phrase its members used in high school: whenever somebody did something stupid at a party, such as spilling beer on the carpet, they cited soccer laws and gave the offender a "yellow card" for committing a "party foul".

Yellowcard's original lineup featured Ben Dobson on vocals, Todd Clary on rhythm guitar and vocals, Ben Harper on lead guitar, Warren Cooke on bass, and Longineu Parsons III on drums. Modern Amusement frontman Ryan Key sometimes appeared as a guest, on background vocals, as did violinist Sean Mackin. Key had also been in California band Craig's Brother.

Yellowcard recorded their first LP, Midget Tossing, at the Music Factory in Jacksonville Beach with Michael Ray FitzGerald at the board. Where We Stand, the band's second album, featured the same lineup as Midget Tossing, while Mackin was brought in for more songs.(doing about 7 or 8 in Where We Stand. As to one in Midget Tossing) however, the band outsted Dobson and replaced him with former guest vocalist Key. This changed the band's style from hardcore punk to pop punk.

In early 2000, Yellowcard recorded the Still Standing EP. Soon after it was released, Todd Clary left the band. Key then filled both Clary's and Dobson's duties, guitar and vocals respectively. After sending the new EP to friend Steve Lubarsky at Lobster Records, the band signed its first recording contract in June 2000 and in November, headed west to Camarillo, California, to begin working on another full-length album. The group released its third album, One for the Kids (Lobster Records), in 2001 and followed up with The Underdog EP (Fueled by Ramen Records) in 2002. Both of these were well received by fans. However, soon after The Underdog EP was released, Warren Cooke left for personal reasons on July 16, 2002. The band then asked Pete Mosely from Inspection 12 to play bass, and he joined the band four days later.

=== 2003–2005: Ocean Avenue ===
Shortly after releasing The Underdog EP, Yellowcard signed with Capitol Records. The group recorded their major-label debut Ocean Avenue in February–March 2003 and released on July 22, 2003. During the recording of the album, Mosely left Yellowcard, devoting his time to his first band, Inspection 12, and finishing the band's album, Get Rad. The members of Yellowcard began the search for a new bass player and chose Alex Lewis, whose sister, Alieke Wijnveldt, contributed vocals to the Ocean Avenue track "View from Heaven". After Lewis joined, the band filmed an unreleased music video for the song "Powder". The video was later put on the enhanced version of Ocean Avenue.

Yellowcard released its first single from Ocean Avenue, "Way Away". The song did exceptional on MTV2 and rock radio, peaking at No. 25 on the modern-rock charts. The song gave them enough notoriety to cause the band's mainstream explosion. In the middle of the band's first headlining tour, Peter Mosely decided to leave Inspection 12 and asked if he could rejoin Yellowcard. Because Mosely had been an integral part of the writing for Ocean Avenue and had also been friends with most of the band's members since high school, Lewis was asked to leave on March 1, 2004, and Mosely was reinstated as the bass player.

In late 2003, Yellowcard finally broke through with a hit single, "Ocean Avenue", in part due to the song premiering on MTV's Total Request Live. Radio eventually picked up on the single, with it peaking at No. 37 on the Billboard Hot 100 during the summer of 2004. The band experienced its peak popularity during the second half of 2004. They were cover features on Alternative Press magazine, a headliner of the 2004 Warped Tour, performed "Ocean Avenue" and won the MTV2 award at the 2004 MTV Video Music Awards, and were featured in the season 2 premiere of One Tree Hill with their song "Empty Apartment". The band was featured episode 3 in season 8 of MTV's Real World/Road Rules Challenge (later abridged to "The Challenge"), performing "Way Away" while cast members trashed a mock hotel room for a "rock star redecoration" challenge. The album's first track, "Way Away", appeared on the video game soundtracks of SSX 3 and Madden NFL 2004. The album's second track, "Breathing", also appeared in EA's video games Burnout 3: Takedown and FlatOut 2. Following the success of "Ocean Avenue", the band released the single "Only One", a rock ballad which also did fairly well on TRL and radio. Ocean Avenue went on to sell close to two million copies in the U.S. alone and six million overall worldwide.

During this time, Yellowcard contributed songs to various other soundtracks. The first, "Gifts and Curses", appeared in the hit film Spider-Man 2. Another, a cover of Lagwagon's "Violins", was featured on Rock Against Bush, Vol. 2 compilation album. At the 2005 MTV Movie Awards, Yellowcard performed a cover of the song "Don't You (Forget About Me)" during a special tribute to the movie The Breakfast Club.

On August 13, 2013, an acoustic version of Ocean Avenue was released in honor of the album's 10th anniversary.

=== 2005–2006: Lights and Sounds ===
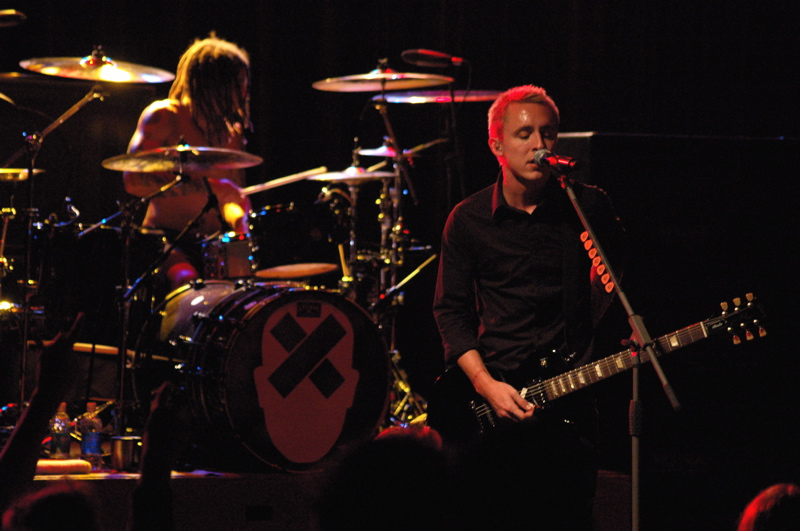
Key and Parsons performing with Yellowcard on the Lights and Sounds tour in 2006

After almost two years of touring, Yellowcard took a few months off at the beginning of 2005. Ryan Key and Peter Mosely moved to New York City to write the songs for the group's next album. The rest of the band remained in Los Angeles. The band regrouped in LA in the spring and began pre-production for the follow-up to Ocean Avenue in March. Recording and production was finished in September, and advertising began for the album. The band had originally announced that the album was expected for August 2005, but production and other delays pushed the release date back several months.

In the months following, many problems had arisen between the bandmates, with Key stating, "The fame went to our heads." After months of increasing tension stemming from Ben Harper's increased involvement with his indie label Takeover Records, Harper was removed from Yellowcard. He was replaced by Ryan Mendez from the band Staring Back.

Lights and Sounds was finally released on January 24, 2006. A loose concept album, the theme centers around Yellowcard's negative feelings towards Los Angeles. Prior to the release of Lights and Sounds Ryan Key said that this ambitious album would probably alienate a large portion of the group's fan base, and that he was "100 percent okay with that." 20 songs were recorded for the album, 14 of which are on the CD, plus a B-side available on import versions, CD singles, and at the iTunes Store, called "Three Flights Down". The opening track, "Three Flights Up", was the first instrumental track on a Yellowcard album since "Interlewd" on the band's first album, Midget Tossing. Those two and "Convocation" from their 2014 release, Lift a Sail, are the only instrumental tracks the band has released on an album.

The title track, "Lights and Sounds", was the first single, released a week before the album. It peaked at No. 4 on the Billboard Hot Modern Rock Tracks. It is also featured on the video games Burnout Revenge, Burnout Legends and Guitar Hero: Modern Hits. In its first week of release, the album sold just over 90,000 copies, but it only went on to receive gold status. High first week sales are most likely the result of high anticipation of the album, as it was the follow-up to the highly successful Ocean Avenue; low total sales backup Key's statement about the album being very ambitious and different in sound from Ocean Avenue. On May 6, 2006, the second and final single and video of the album, "Rough Landing, Holly", was released. The single was not as well received as the first, and after its first week of release, it quickly dropped on the charts.

In May 2006, Ryan Key had surgery on his vocal chords after having problems with his singing. He had started having problems in December 2005. He was mute for a week and could not sing for more than a month. Yellowcard, after canceling some shows and receiving some time off from touring, joined the Virgin Mega Tour for the summer of 2006.

=== 2006–2008: Paper Walls ===
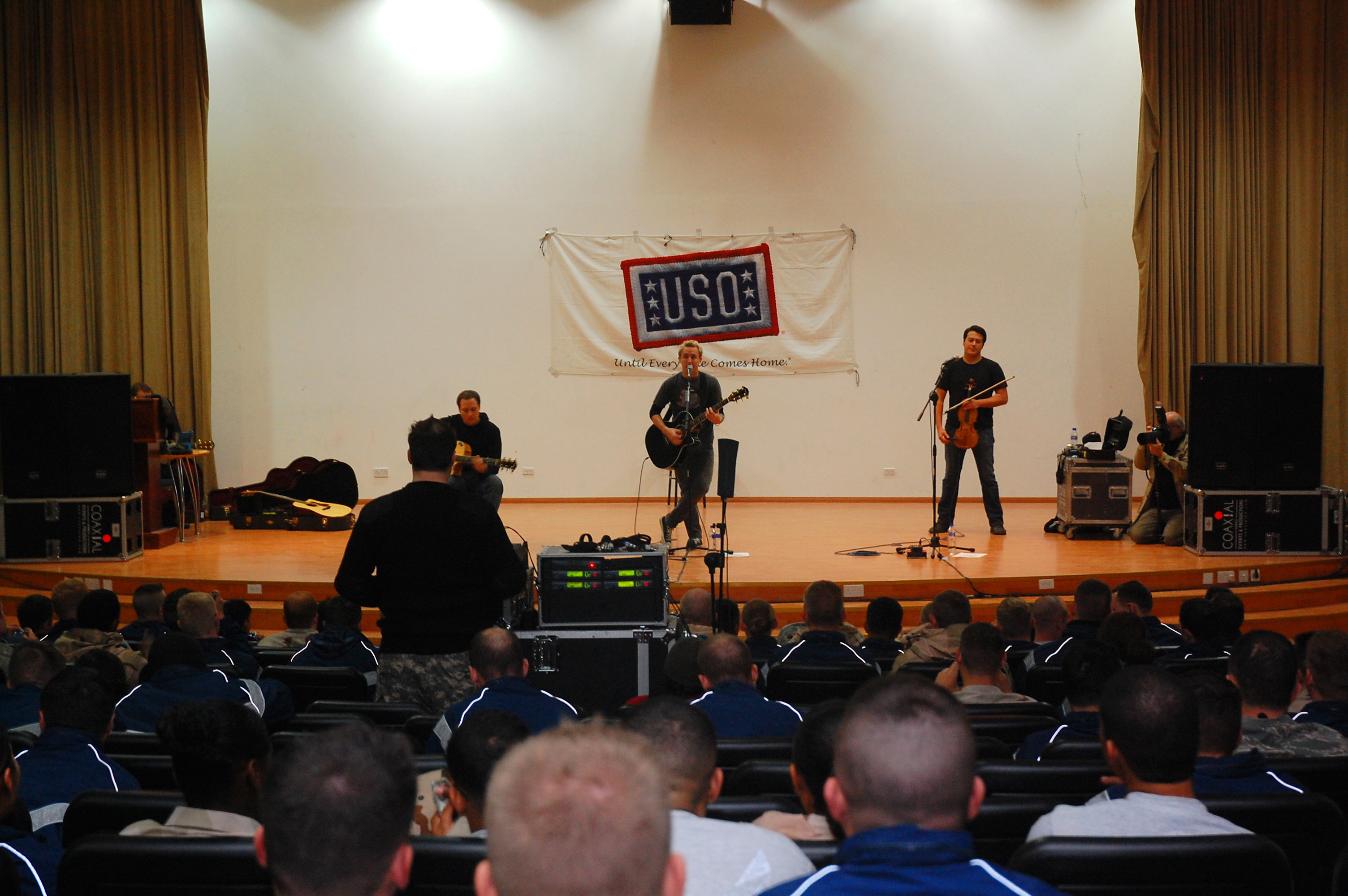
Yellowcard performing for members of the US armed services in January 2008

On October 16, 2006, Yellowcard announced via its website that the group was back in the studio recording a new album. Guitarist Ryan Mendez posted on the official Yellowcard message board on October 21, 2006, that three songs had been completed and stated, "I really think fans of both older and newer Yellowcard are going to be very happy." Pre-production began in October 2006, and tracking began in January 2007. Between the months of January and March 2007, studio footage labeled "Yellowcard Sessions" regarding the band's progress on making the album was posted on their Myspace, with a new video added every Thursday. In total, 10 videos were posted, with additional footage released on the deluxe CD/DVD edition of Paper Walls. Additionally, in January 2007, some sample demo songs were released on the band's MySpace, though they were only rough recordings from pre-production and not the final recorded versions. The first demo was a 30-second preview of the iTunes bonus track, "Bombers", and the second was a clip of an unmixed version of "Light Up the Sky".

The first Yellowcard show since October 2006 took place on March 29, 2007, at the Troubadour in Hollywood, California. At the show, lead singer Ryan Key announced to a sold-out crowd that the new album would be titled Paper Walls. He said he would "probably get in trouble for [it]", but went on to announce the title anyway; Key also announced the album title during a concert at Southern Connecticut State University. During the Troubadour show, the group played two songs from its new album ("Fighting" and "The Takedown"). Yellowcard played an acoustic set the next night at the Troubadour and premiered two new songs, "Shadows and Regrets" and "Light Up the Sky".

In the teaser of an interview with Jason Tate of AbsolutePunk released on June 17 (one month before the release of the album), Key described the album:

... very much a record of hope and finding yourself again. It's after you've come through all of that – going to the height of it – and picking yourself back up again. And by "hitting rock bottom", I don't mean in record sales or fame or any of that shit. I mean personally – emotionally ... Paper Walls is the story, the feeling, of what it's like to be out of those holes, looking back, no regrets, but smarter and having grown through them.

Yellowcard announced on May 15 via Myspace that the first single from Paper Walls would be "Light Up the Sky". This song was released to iTunes and radio on June 5. Soon after its release, Paper Walls became the second most popular album on iTunes and the most popular album in the alternative section. On July 9, Yellowcard released Paper Walls on the group's Myspace music player to give fans a taste of what was to come on the new album. Paper Walls was released in the U.S. on July 17 (July 16 on iTunes) in an additional CD/DVD format, as Lights and Sounds was the previous year. The DVD contains exclusive behind-the-scenes footage of the band, an extensive photo gallery and two additional live bonus tracks. In June 2007, Yellowcard was voted to do AOL Sessions Under Cover. It was released on July 20 and featured two songs from Paper Walls. The album debuted at No. 13 on the U.S. Billboard 200, selling about 40,000 copies in its first week.

Yellowcard promoted Paper Walls nonstop after its release and started touring to support the album. The group supported Blue October during the band's United States 2007 fall tour and also supported Linkin Park in Japan in November/December 2007. While touring, Peter Mosely announced in a Myspace blog message that he would be leaving Yellowcard to pursue other endeavors, moving back to Jacksonville and rejoining his old band. Josh Portman from the bands Near Miss and Staring Back took over on bass until the reformation of Yellowcard in 2010, upon which Sean O'Donnell of Reeve Oliver became the bass player.

On January 7, Yellowcard went to the Middle East to do a USO tour. The group went to Kuwait as originally planned but could not get into Iraq because of President Bush arriving and canceling all flights there. The band released a live album on January 22, 2008, titled iTunes Live from Las Vegas at the Palms. It was recorded during their tour with Blue October in 2007. The band canceled several European shows in January due to drummer Longineu Parsons taking a couple months off to spend time with his grandmother, who raised him and whose health was failing. The band was originally scheduled to headline a spring tour with All Time Low, but All Time Low dropped out to take part in the Alternative Press spring tour. They were then replaced by MxPx, who canceled a few weeks later. Yellowcard then went on an acoustic tour with The Spill Canvas, Secondhand Serenade, PlayRadioPlay!, and Treaty of Paris.

=== 2008–2010: Hiatus ===
Yellowcard announced in an interview in April 2008 that the group would be going on an "indefinite hiatus." The band's European tour set for 2008 was canceled, and they instead embarked on an acoustic tour in the spring of 2008 before going on hiatus. Among the reasons for the band's hiatus were individual member situations. Longineu Parsons took some time off in the winter to spend time with family and joined a side project band based in Jacksonville, Florida. Sean Mackin got married in 2008 and wanted to take some time off to spend with his family. Ryan Key stated that the members needed some time to figure out their personal lives. The band members were unsure of the hiatus' length, but they assured their fans they planned to return as a group. In May 2008, Yellowcard left Capitol Records and was left unsigned. On June 16, 2009, Capitol released an EP titled Deep Cuts, which consists of four previously released tracks. Key and Sean O'Donnell of Reeve Oliver formed a small side project called Big If. Big If released many demos online and had a record due out in late 2009 which was cancelled. The band featured a more pop punk approach in most of its first songs, though by the time they had reached the second set of demos, they had almost completely progressed into a pop rock style. Parsons played drums for Adam Lambert from October 2009 through September 18, 2010, before returning to Yellowcard after its hiatus.

=== 2010–2012: Reformation and When You're Through Thinking, Say Yes ===
Longineu Parsons mentioned in a YouTube video that Yellowcard had started talking about a new record. Yellowcard's official Facebook page announced on August 1, 2010, that the band had reformed and would be working on a new record. Josh Portman, the former bass player, was replaced by Sean O'Donnell of Dogwood and Reeve Oliver and Ryan's other side project, Big If. In the May issue of Alternative Press, former bassist Pete Mosely revealed he was contacted by Parsons about rejoining before the band reconvened, but ultimately decided not to reunite with the rest of Yellowcard.

Since the reformation announcement, the Yellowcard YouTube account was reopened and featured weekly sessions about the recording of the new album. It was also in these sessions that a handful of names and snippets of songs were released. Big If songs "Empty Street", "Hide", and "Hang You Up" were rumored to be reworked and featured on the new record ("Empty Street" ultimately did not make the cut). One of the first confirmed tracks on the new record, "See Me Smiling", was originally an instrumental demo Ryan Mendez wrote and recorded at his home studio, which he sent to the other band members. They decided to record it for the new record. The bridge is one of Key's favorite vocal parts in all of Yellowcard's library. "Sing For Me" was confirmed in the November issue of Alternative Press, issue 269. The song is written from the perspective of Key's terminally ill aunt, Aunt Stephanie, who was mentioned in "Rock Star Land". The recording process finished on November 8, 2010. The band later announced the name and release date of the first single, "For You, and Your Denial". It was made available for purchase on iTunes and streaming at www.absolutepunk.net starting January 18, 2011. Also, the music video for this song was released. The second single, "Hang You Up", was released February 22. The new album released on March 22, 2011, on iTunes and CD.

Yellowcard released dates for concerts for part of 2010 and the majority of 2011. The band toured with All Time Low throughout Europe in March 2011, around the same time that the album was released. On November 13, 2010, the band played its first show after coming back from hiatus at The Glass House in Pomona, California. This was the first time the whole band had played together since December 2007. During the show, Ryan Key revealed the name of the new record after insistent chants. The new record, he announced, was to be titled When You're Through Thinking, Say Yes. Shortly afterward, the group played the first single from the new record, "For You, and Your Denial". Responding to the apparent lack of Yellowcard's older work at The Glass House show, Key stated that it was to keep the energy up in the crowds. In addition to the Europe tour in March, Yellowcard announced a spring 2011 U.S. tour with All Time Low, Hey Monday, and The Summer Set. In the late spring and early summer of 2011, Yellowcard participated in a brief U.S. tour with Good Charlotte and Runner Runner. In June 2011, during an interview with Punkvideosrock.com, Ryan Key stated that the band would participate in a headlining tour in the fall of 2011. In fall 2011, the band headlined a U.S. tour with Go Radio and Every Avenue (with whom Ryan Key had co-written two songs: "Girl Like That" (2009) and "Tie Me Down" (2011)).

Ryan Key also recorded a song with Silverstein called "Stay Posi" for the Take Action! Vol. 10 compilation.

On October 24, 2011, Yellowcard released When You're Through Thinking, Say Yes Acoustic. This release was generally a surprise to the fan base, as it was announced only two days earlier during the group's show in Chicago (and sold following the show at the merchandise table). The album was streaming on Absolutepunk.net for one day and is now available on iTunes. In addition, the band mentioned that the record is available at select indie record stores. Beginning on November 28, 2011, and continuing into December, Yellowcard participated in a Co-Headlining a Tour with Saves The Day and supporting act The Wonder Years. The tour stopped at several cities in the UK including Glasgow, Manchester, Birmingham, and London. Beginning around the holidays in mid-December, the band returned to the United States, completing more than a full year of touring.

=== 2012–2014: Southern Air and Ocean Avenue Acoustic ===
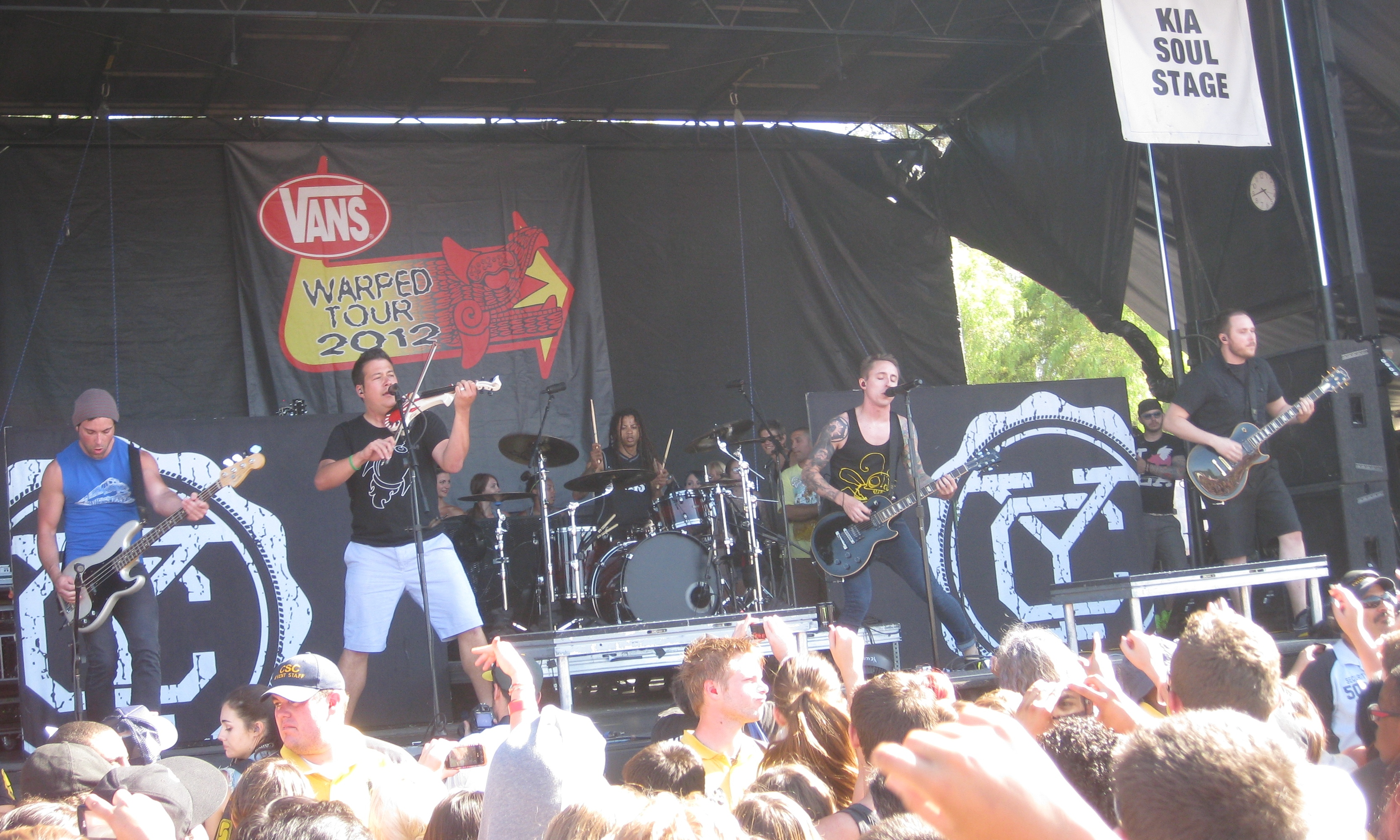
Yellowcard performing on Warped Tour 2012 (L–R: Josh Portman, Sean Mackin, Longineu Parsons III, Ryan Key and Ryan Mendez)

Yellowcard announced at several shows in November 2011 that the group would be returning to the studio in early 2012 to record a new record. Key stated that the positive reception from When You're Through Thinking, Say Yes and the overall positive energy that the band was generating was inspiration to begin writing again. The band had already begun to write material for the new record. On February 10, it was announced that all the new music had been demoed, and Key would start writing lyrics. On February 3, 2012, Sean O'Donnell posted a message on Yellowcard's website stating he was leaving the band because he was getting married and wanted to focus on his family. On the 17th of the same month, also on the band's website, it was announced that Josh Portman would be filling the spot as bassist. On March 5, 2012, the group entered the studio to begin recording their next album. Alex Gaskarth of All Time Low, Cassadee Pope of Hey Monday, and Taylor Jardine of We Are the In Crowd were confirmed to be appearing as guest vocalists on the album. Yellowcard announced that it had finished the record on April 8, after five weeks of recording. On May 21, the first single from the album, "Always Summer", premiered on the website AbsolutePunk and was available for free streaming. The next day, it was available for purchase on iTunes and Amazon.

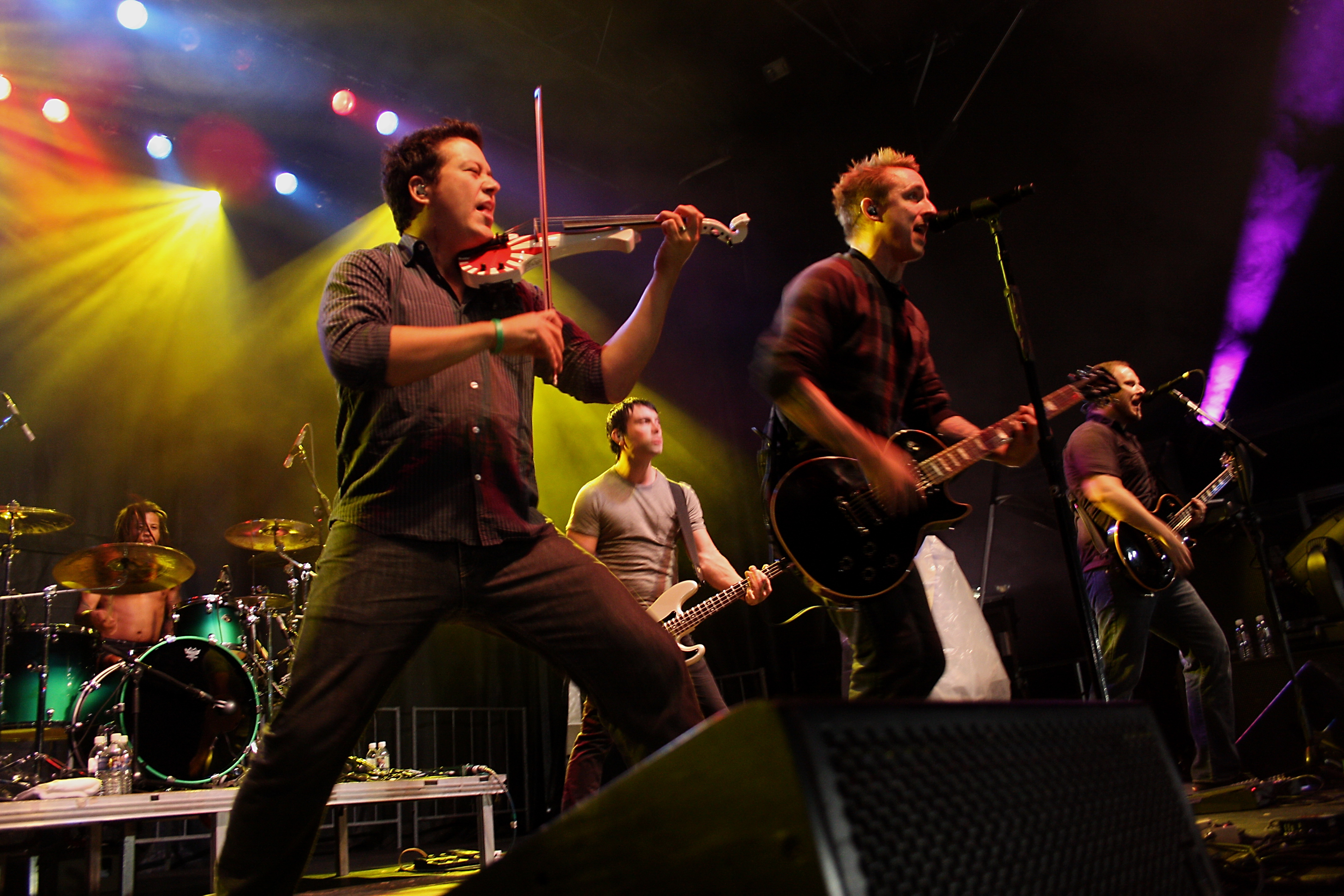
Yellowcard in concert in Arizona in 2012

On July 11, Yellowcard released the opening track for Southern Air, "Awakening". The lyric video of the song was released online via Hopeless Records. On July 15, the band confirmed that the next single would be called "Here I Am Alive", which was released on July 31. On August 7, the full album was made available for streaming on YouTube under Hopeless Records. The "Here I Am Alive" music video featuring Tay Jardine premiered on August 14 on MTV. On August 21, acoustic versions of "Always Summer" and "Here I Am Alive" became available on Hopeless Records' YouTube channel. On September 26, Yellowcard released an acoustic version of "Telescope" on Hopeless Records' YouTube channel. On December 10, 2012, the band released a music video for "Awakening" on MTV Buzzworthy.

On December 6, Yellowcard's members announced that they were back in the studio. On May 3, 2013, the band confirmed rumors via Twitter about the recording of an acoustic remake of Ocean Avenue in honor of the platinum album's 10th anniversary. On June 3, 2013, pre-orders were set up for Ocean Avenue Acoustic. The album was released on August 13, 2013. The band also announced an Ocean Avenue Acoustic tour that fall with guest Geoff Rickly of Thursday. During the tour, the band performed "Paper Walls" live for the first time.

On October 29, 2013, Yellowcard announced that the group would be releasing a cover of Tony Sly's song called "Already Won", which is included in The Songs of Tony Sly: A Tribute. The band was also featured on a Punk Goes Christmas compilation with a cover of "Christmas Lights" by Coldplay.

During January and February 2014, Yellowcard completed a second leg of the Ocean Avenue Acoustic across the United States in cities that the group had not previously performed; the tour was supported by What's Eating Gilbert. At various shows during the tour and on the members personal social media accounts, the band members began stating that they had been writing new music and would be returning to the studio that year.

=== 2014–2015: Parsons' departure and Lift a Sail ===
On February 12, 2014, it was announced that Yellowcard would be playing the entire 2014 Vans Warped Tour. On March 13, 2014, the band announced that drummer and founding member Longineu Parsons III had left the band. On March 20, Yellowcard announced it had left Hopeless Records after three years and three albums to sign a worldwide multi-album deal with Razor & Tie. It was then announced that a new record would be released in the fall of 2014. On March 24, the band announced that Nate Young from Anberlin would be playing drums on the new album and on April 14, further confirmed that he would perform with the band at the Warped Tour.

On August 4, 2014, Yellowcard announced that the next album would be titled Lift a Sail. On the same day, the Yellowcard Twitter account linked to a post from AbsolutePunk.net which revealed the album's artwork and track list. The album would have 13 tracks. Also on August 4, the band announced a co-headline tour with Memphis May Fire, with special guests Emarosa. The tour would take place across the U.S. in the fall of 2014 and would begin the week after the album was released. On the 28th of the same month, it was announced that Tucker Rule, formerly of the band Thursday, would be drumming on the tour. On August 19, 2014, Yellowcard released the first single, "One Bedroom", as the lead single from Lift a Sail, which would be released October 7, 2014. Yellowcard toured the UK with Less Than Jake in the spring of 2015 and Australia with Mayday Parade in the summer of 2015 and in the U.S. with New Found Glory from October 18 to November 22, 2015.

=== 2016–2017: Eponymous final album and break-up ===
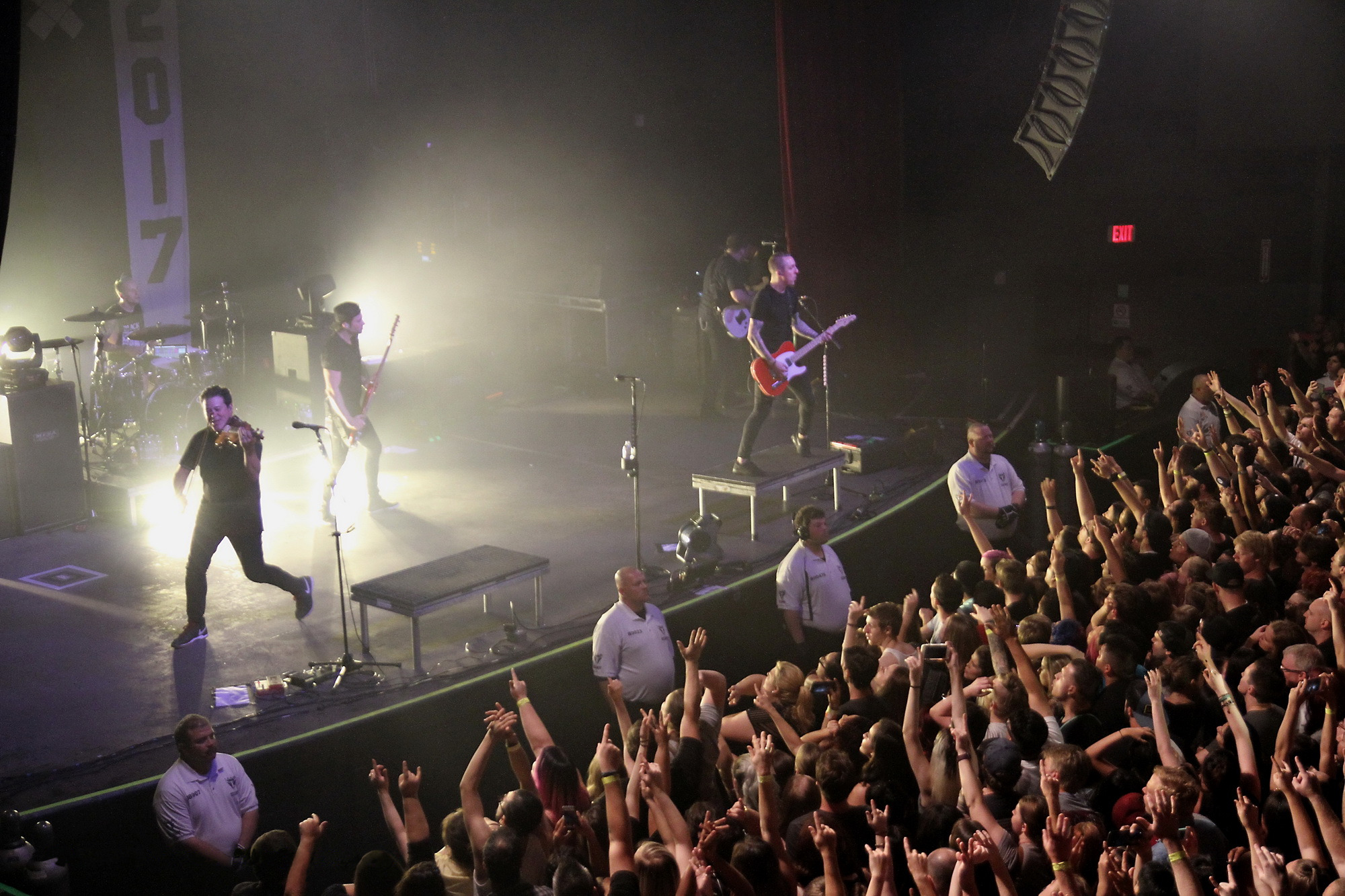
Yellowcard performing in Arizona in 2017

On February 24, 2016, Hopeless Records announced that Yellowcard had rejoined the label and that the band was recording an album, which was to be released in late 2016. Nate Young was confirmed to be playing drums on the new record. On April 6, 2016, Ryan Key confirmed on his Twitter account that the name of one of the new tracks would be "I'm a Wrecking Ball", which was written and demoed in 2008 with Ryan Mendez and Dan McLintock. On June 7, 2016, the band announced on Facebook that its new album would be self-titled; Yellowcard was released on September 30, 2016. On June 24, 2016, the band released the lead single off of the album titled "Rest In Peace". On August 17, 2016, the music video for "The Hurt Is Gone" was released.

On March 22, 2016, it was announced that Yellowcard would be playing the entire 2016 Vans Warped Tour. On June 25, 2016, the band announced on its website that the group would be breaking up after a final tour, stating: "Please come and join us on our last trip around the globe. We hope to share this final record and tour with each and every one of you." The tour continued to the United Kingdom in December 2016, an Australian tour in February 2017, then one last string of US dates on the west coast in March. The group announced that Jimmy Brunkvist from Like Torches would fulfill drumming duties for the final touring cycle. On March 21 and 22, the band played make-up shows to sold-out crowds in Albuquerque, New Mexico, and Tempe, Arizona, respectively. The band played their final show on March 25, 2017, at the House Of Blues in Anaheim, California. On April 12, 2017, the final music video, "A Place We Set Afire" was released.

=== 2017–2021: Post-breakup and Juice Wrld lawsuit ===
Following the band's breakup, Key pursued a solo career under his full name, William Ryan Key. He released three EPs and toured as a solo act, with Mendez and Portman occasionally appearing onstage with him. Key also served as a touring guitarist for New Found Glory beginning in 2018, and made appearances at Linkin Park's tribute concert for their late singer Chester Bennington in October 2017 and at the 2018 Vans Warped Tour.

In 2019, members of the Lights and Sounds-era lineup of Yellowcard collectively sued rapper Juice Wrld, claiming that his song "Lucid Dreams" plagiarized the melody of their song "Holly Wood Died". The band recruited lawyer Richard Busch, who was best known for representing the estate of Marvin Gaye during the "Blurred Lines" case. It was reported Busch's law firm were suing Juice Wrld for $15 million; Busch himself, however, claimed that the value was "falsely reported", and that the band members were "simply seeking what the law allows, and what parties in their position have sought in similar cases, which at this point is not determined". Following the rapper's death later that year, the members extended their deadline for a defendant to respond to the lawsuit. This intensified the controversy significantly, as many news outlets pointed out that it meant the band was still pursuing the lawsuit despite the rapper's death. Though in a press statement, Busch did highlight that the members had very mixed emotions.

"My clients are certainly torn about proceeding, and understand the optics involved. But it is important to remember that this lawsuit was filed before this tragic event, and was filed because all of the defendants (and there are two other writers and several music publishers and record labels) profited off of what we believe was clear copying and infringement of Yellowcard's work." – Richard Busch

Yellowcard ultimately chose to drop the lawsuit in 2020 after Juice Wrld's mother became the representative of his estate. Busch stated that the band was "very sympathetic not only of Juice Wrld's death, but also needed time to decide whether they really wanted to pursue the case against his grieving mother as the personal representative of his estate." He also noted, however, that the case could be refiled if the band were to change their minds.

In 2021, Key and Mendez formed an electronic music duo called JEDHA.

=== 2022–2024: Reunion, Childhood Eyes and A Hopeful Sign ===
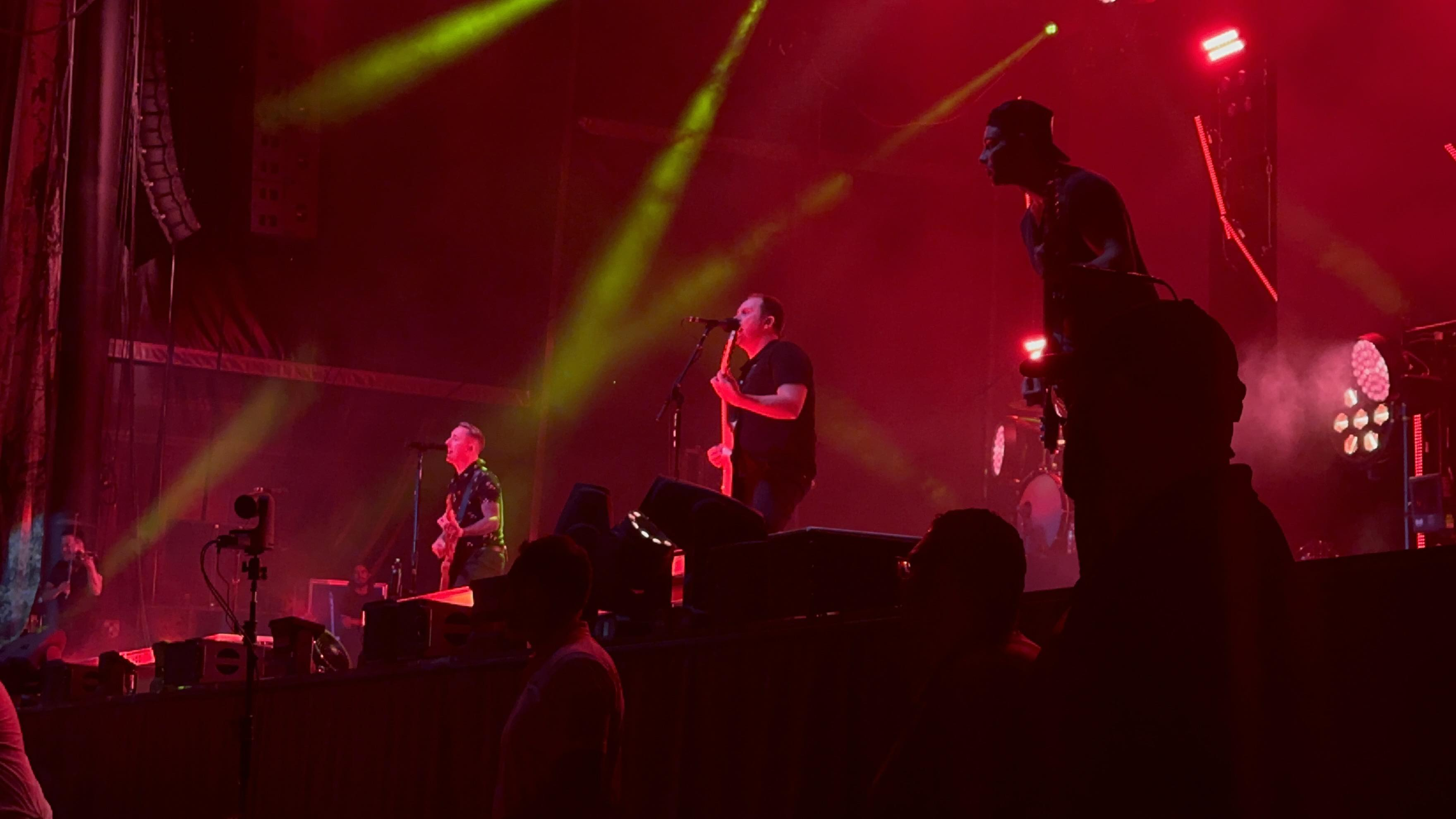
Yellowcard performing in Philadelphia in 2023

Yellowcard reunited on September 17, 2022, at Riot Fest in Chicago. The set featured a full play-through of the album Ocean Avenue as well as a handful of other songs. On September 26, the band announced they would be playing Slam Dunk Festival in May 2023. Additionally the band announced they would be playing at the When We Were Young Festival on October 21, 2023.

On February 14, 2023, the band announced a summer tour to commemorate the 20th anniversary of Ocean Avenue across the U.S. alongside Mayday Parade, This Wild Life, Story of the Year, and Anberlin. On May 20, 2023, the band announced a new single titled "Childhood Eyes" after a stint of teaser posts on social media. The song was released on May 31, 2023, as the lead-off single of an EP of the same name, released on July 21 via Equal Vision Records.

During a January 11, 2024, appearance on Good Morning America, the band announced a collaborative project entitled A Hopeful Sign. The album consists of nine previous Yellowcard songs reimagined and reworked by ambient post rock duo Hammock. The compilation was released on February 9, 2024. The band joined Third Eye Blind on their Summer Gods Tour in the summer of 2024. While on tour, the band also released a cover of the Jimmy Eat World song "Hear You Me" with all proceeds being donated to a friend of the band whose family had recently experienced a loss. In September 2024, the band collaborated with Chrissy Costanza of Against the Current to record a cover of "A Whole New World" from the 1992 Disney film Aladdin as part of Disney's A Whole New Sound compilation album.

=== 2025–present: Better Days ===
In spring of 2025, Yellowcard signed with Better Noise Music and would be releasing a new full-length album produced by Blink-182's Travis Barker. On May 28, 2025, the band released two new tracks: "Better Days" and "Honestly I". "Better Days", which the band had begun playing live the previous year, serves as the title track and lead single to their eleventh studio album, which was released October 10. The song became the group's first to chart at number-one, topping Billboard's Alternative Airplay chart and setting a chart record for the longest stretch between an artist's first appearance and first number-one entry, having first charted with "Way Away" in 2003. The track ultimately logged three weeks atop the Alternative chart. A remixed version of an album cut "Bedroom Posters" featuring Good Charlotte was serviced to radio in 2026 as the third single from Better Days, eventually topping the Alternative chart for two weeks and giving the band two number-one singles from the album.

The band headlined the Up Up Down Down Tour in 2026 with openers Plain White T’s and New Found Glory. They also made an appearance at Welcome to Rockville, which took place in Daytona Beach, Florida, in May 2026.

The deluxe edition of Better Days, featuring the new songs "Calvary Drive" and "Hell with Me" (featuring Steve Aoki), was released on September 18, 2026.

== Artistry, musical style and influences ==
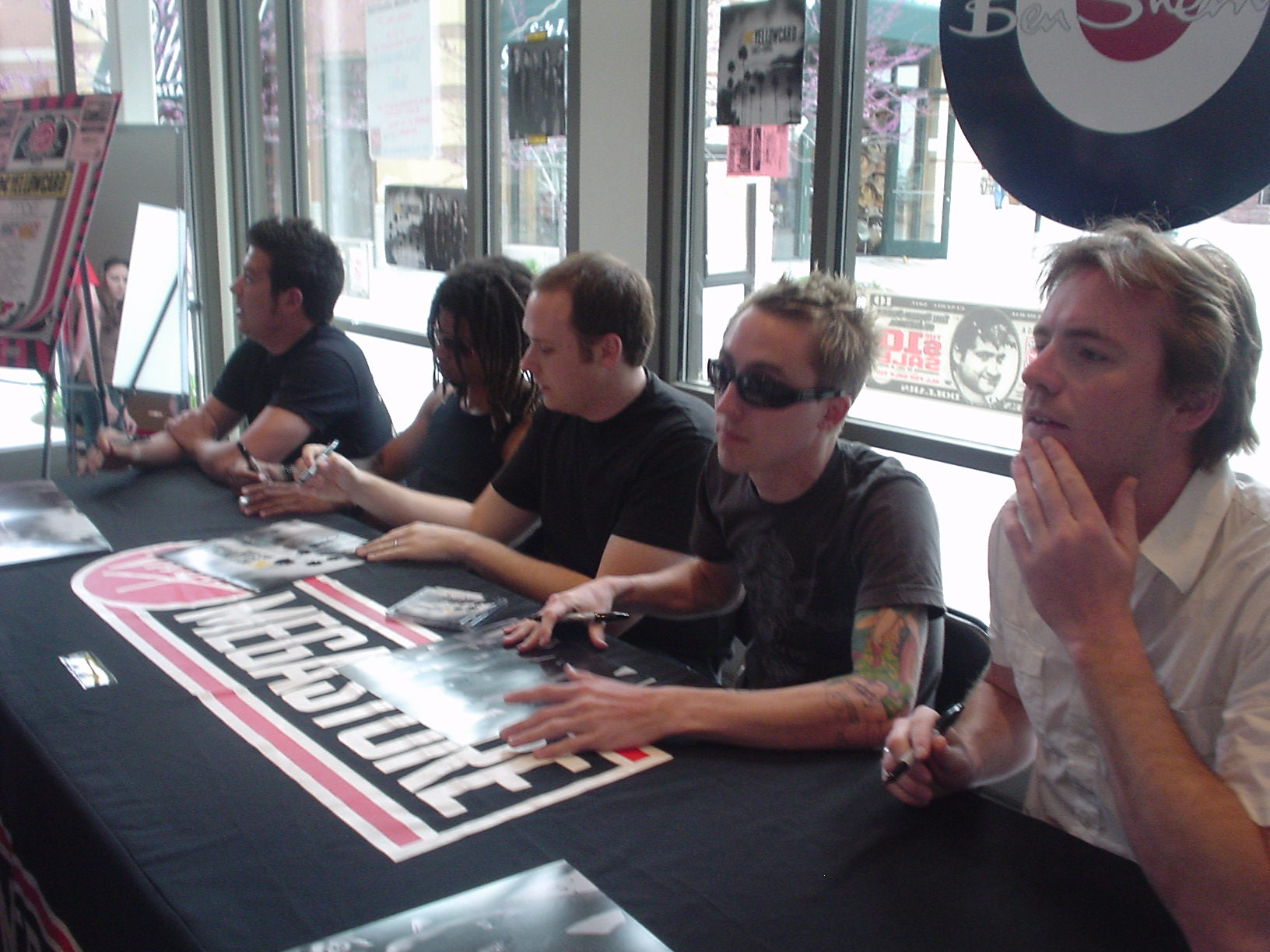
Yellowcard signing autographs for fans at a meet and greet in 2006

Yellowcard has mainly been described as pop-punk, emo alternative rock, and hardcore punk. Their first two studio albums were defined primarily by hardcore punk influences, but the band oscillated towards more of a streamlined pop punk identity when Ryan Key became the band's lead singer. The albums Lights and Sounds (2006) and Lift A Sail (2014) saw the band experiment with alternative rock and arena rock stylings.

Key has cited Third Eye Blind, Radiohead, No Use for a Name, the Foo Fighters, Weezer, Coldplay, Propagandhi, Soundgarden, Pearl Jam, Nirvana, the Smashing Pumpkins and NOFX as some of his most prominent musical influences. He has also listed Michael Jackson, Madonna and New Kids On The Block as helping him lead into the pop influences on Yellowcard's music. Mackin, the band's violinist, has cited Itzhak Perlman as one of his favorite composers, and was primarily influenced by classical music in his younger years.

Parsons, the band's founding drummer, has credited watching Headbangers Ball on MTV and listening to Pantera with sparking his initial interest in rock and heavy metal. Mendez is a fan of Lagwagon and Stone Temple Pilots. Portman enjoyed glam and thrash metal as a child before exploring an interest in punk and post-hardcore in his teenage years; he and Mendez briefly played in Staring Back together in the mid-2000s before joining Yellowcard.

== Awards and nominations ==
Award	Year	Nominee(s)	Category	Result	Ref.
MTV Video Music Awards	2004	"Ocean Avenue"	Best New Artist in a Video	Nominated	
MTV Video Music Awards	2004	"Ocean Avenue"	MTV2 Award	Won	
MTV Video Music Awards	2004	"Ocean Avenue"	Viewer's Choice	Nominated	
Teen Choice Awards	2004	Themselves	Choice Rock Group	Nominated	
Teen Choice Awards	2004	Themselves	Choice Breakout Music Artist	Nominated	
Teen Choice Awards	2006	Themselves	Choice Music: V-Cast Artist	Nominated	

== Band members ==
Current members

- Sean Mackin – violin, mandolin, backing vocals (1997–2017, 2022–present)
- Ryan Key – lead vocals (1999–2017, 2022–present), rhythm guitar (2000–2017, 2022–present), piano (2002–2017), bass (2002–2003; 2004–2010), guest vocals (1997–1999)
- Ryan Mendez – lead guitar, backing vocals (2005–2017, 2022–present)
- Josh Portman – bass, backing vocals (2012–2017, 2022–present; touring 2007–2010)

Current touring musicians

- Jimmy Brunkvist (from Like Torches) – drums (2016–2017, 2023–present)

Former members

- Ben Dobson – lead vocals (1997–1999)
- Todd Clary – rhythm guitar (1997–2000)
- Warren Cooke – bass, backing vocals (1997–2002)
- Ben Harper – lead guitar (1997–2005)
- Longineu W. Parsons III – drums, percussion (1997–2014)
- Alex Lewis – bass, backing vocals (2003–2004)
- Peter Mosely – bass, piano, backing vocals (2002–2003; 2004–2007; touring 2002–2003)
- Sean O'Donnell – bass, backing vocals (2010–2012)

Former touring musicians

- Tucker Rule (from Thursday) – drums (2014–2015)
- Nate Young (from Anberlin) – drums (2015–2016, 2022–2023)
- Rob Chianelli (from We Are the In Crowd) – drums (2016)
- Cyrus Bolooki (from New Found Glory) – drums (2016)

== Discography ==
Studio albums

- Midget Tossing (1997)
- Where We Stand (1999)
- One for the Kids (2001)
- Ocean Avenue (2003)
- Lights and Sounds (2006)
- Paper Walls (2007)
- When You're Through Thinking, Say Yes (2011)
- Southern Air (2012)
- Lift a Sail (2014)
- Yellowcard (2016)
- Better Days (2025)
