= Sensei (band) =

Background information
- Origin: Jacksonville, Florida, United States
- Genres: Melodic hardcore
- Years active: 2004–2007
- Members: Dan McLintock; Mark O'Quinn; Tim Grisnik; Damion Waters; Eric Denton

Sensei was a five-piece melodic rock band from Jacksonville, Florida.

== History ==
The idea was born in the summer of 2004 when guitarist Damion Waters and bassist Dan McLintock (also see: Inspection 12) began writing together for their then unnamed project. Following the conception of several songs, the two began recording ideas; slowly piecing guitar parts and vocal harmonies together on Damion's home computer. At the time, both members resided and attended college in separate cities, so meetings were few and far between. Five acoustic demos are known to exist from those early sessions.

Eventually, Dan and Damion enlisted the help of lifelong friend and drummer, Tim Grisnik (also see: Inspection 12); who was given the demos and began writing drums for the already existing songs. Following the addition of bassist, Jordan Pettingill, the line-up was finally complete, and the band was given its name. Appearing live for the first time in the fall of 2005, Sensei attracted immediate local attention, building an organic following of fans and friends. Around the same time, Dan, Damion, and Tim moved into a house together on the eastside of Jacksonville, enabling collaborative writing and convenient practices.

The next few months would prove somewhat dormant and discouraging. Though the band still performed occasionally, it became increasingly difficult to schedule practices and shows around Jordan, who was still attending college more than an hour outside of Jacksonville. Consequently, in the summer of 2006, the band felt it best to relinquish the bassist of his duties, allowing Jordan to focus on school as well as devote more time to his other musical endeavours.

Originally planning to try life as a three-piece, Sensei was pleasantly surprised with the chance addition of lead vocalist Mark O'Quinn and second guitarist, Eric Denton. Since solidifying the new roster, Sensei has progressed more than ever; boasting several completed songs. As for the future, the band plans to enter the studio and have music to share by the spring of 2007.

As of May 2007 Sensei has dissolved with most of its members pursuing different projects.

== Members ==
Sensei performing in 2006.

- Dan McLintock - Bass, vocals
- Tim Grisnik - Drums, percussion
- Damion Waters - Guitar, vocals
- Mark O'Quinn - Lead vocals
- Eric Denton - Guitar, vocals

== Other projects ==
- Dan McLintock was once a member of Takeover Records band, Craig's Brother as well as the former Honest Don's outfit, Limp.
- Dan McLintock and Tim Grisnik are both members of the once nationally touring band, Inspection 12, currently signed with Takeover Records, formally signed with Fat Wreck Chords. Other Inspection 12 members include Pete Mosely of Yellowcard and James Trimble, who is currently in medical school.
- Tim Grisnik also plays drums for The Softer Side.
- Mark O'Quinn was the lead singer/songwriter of former Jacksonville bands, Stalemate and Estelle.
- Eric Denton wrote and played guitar with Estelle.
- As of July 2007 Damion Waters is playing with The Lackawanna Carriage Works.
- As of September 2008 Dan McLintock, Tim Grisnik and Eric Denton have joined forces with Casey Teate to form The John Carver Band and have recorded two full-length albums (The John Carver Band 2008 & Everywhere is Home 2012) and one EP (Innocent Strategies 2017).
