= Sensei (disambiguation) =

Sensei is an honorific term in Japan.

Sensei may also refer to:

== Arts and entertainment ==
- Sensei (DC Comics), a fictional villain in the DC Comics universe
- Sensei, a fictional penguin from the online game Club Penguin
- Sensei (band), a melodic rock band from Jacksonville, Florida
- "Sensei", a track on the 2017 album Heartbreak on a Full Moon by Chris Brown
- Sensei (First Comics), a four-issue limited series published in 1989
- The Sensei, an independent feature film
- Sensei!, 2017 film
- Sensei (wrestler), Mexican masked professional wrestler
- "Sensei", a 2023 song by Win Win Yeung

== Other uses ==
- Sensei robotic catheter system, a medical device in interventional cardiology
- Sensei Lānaʻi, a wellness center on Lānaʻi, Hawaii

== See also ==
- Sansai (disambiguation)
