= Peter Mosely =

American rock musician (born 1980)

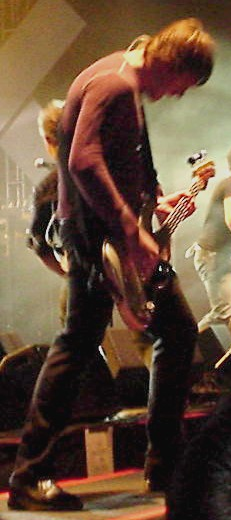
- Mosely performing with Yellowcard in 2006

Background information
- Also known as: Pete, Peter Michael
- Born: Peter Michael Mosely; June 6, 1980 (age 46); Jacksonville, Florida
- Origin: Jacksonville, Florida, U.S.
- Genres: Pop-punk; punk rock; alternative rock; skate punk; Americana
- Occupation: Musician
- Instruments: Vocals; bass; guitar; piano; keyboards
- Years active: 1995–present
- Labels: DIY; Capitol; Takeover; Honest Don's

Peter Michael Mosely (born June 6, 1980) is an American rock musician. He is one of the two guitarists and vocalists and the pianist for the American punk rock band Inspection 12, as well as the former bassist for the American rock band Yellowcard.

== Music career ==
=== Inspection 12 (1995–2004; 2007–present) ===
In December 1995, Mosely was added as the 5th member in Inspection 12 as second guitar and vocals. His first show with the band was at a friend's backyard birthday party. Because he did not know any of their songs, he only played the cover section consisting of songs by NOFX and Weezer. The band went on to record six full length independent albums, and although being a relatively successful local band, Mosely recalls feeling like outcasts because of their preppy clothes and unorthodox style of punk rock, explaining that "Whenever we'd play a show like Good Riddance or AFI, it would always be a real tough crowd. I used to hear it all the time about us being rich kids." The band went on a hiatus in 1999 when singer Dan McLintock joined fellow musician Ryan Key to audition for the Tooth & Nail band Craig's Brother. Ryan soon returned home and joined local band Yellowcard, and a year later Dan also returned, with a proposal from Fat Wreck Chords record label owner Fat Mike to record some new material for consideration for Fat Wreck Chords subsidiary Honest Don's Records. Guitarist James Trimble was by then studying in Tennessee to become an obstetrician so Ryan was asked to help with the recording of their Home EP. Yellowcards violinist Sean Mackin was also featured on strings. After recording their record label debut album In Recovery in December 2000, drummer Scott Shad died after going into diabetic shock while driving his car, but the band persevered and drafted lifelong friend of the band Tim Grisnik as a drummer. They went on a U.S. tour and later returned to the studio to record their second album for Honest Don's, Get Rad. However, after eight months of recording songs, Honest Don's president reportedly told them, "My label doesn't put out this kind of music. And I don't even know what to call it." They were dropped from the record label and bought their recorded material back to finish the album themselves. The band would go on to release its newest album in 11 years, Redefine, in December 2014. The album features the return of original lead vocalist, Rob Reid, to the band.

=== Yellowcard (2002–03; 2004–07) ===
Mosely joined Yellowcard on July 20, 2002, after their first bassist Warren Cooke left the band for personal reasons.

Mosely was simultaneously assisting Yellowcard with writing and recording bass guitar for their Capitol Records debut Ocean Avenue but announced that he left on February 15, 2003. Unwilling to join the band, Yellowcard recruited the bassist Alex Lewis instead. Shortly after the completion of Get Rad, Mosely changed his mind and asked if he could join the band as their permanent bassist. Because Mosely had been an integral part of the writing for Ocean Avenue and had been friends with most of the band's members since high school, Lewis was asked to leave and Mosely became a full-time band member again on March 1, 2004. His first appearance since his return to the band was on Tonight Show with Jay Leno on March 3, 2004.

In 2005, the band members went on their separate ways for a while to create new material for their next album, Mosely moved to New York City with Key while the others moved to Los Angeles. The band reregrouped in LA in the spring 2005 to begin pre-production of their new album.

In April, lead guitarist Ben Harper stated in an interview with MTV News that he was finished with writing the guitar tracks for the album and that he was leaving the band. He was replaced by Ryan Mendez from the band Staring Back. The album Lights and Sounds was released in January 2006, the album's theme centers around the band's negative feelings towards Los Angeles and time of production made the broke away from its pop punk sound to a more alternative rock album. The album peaked at number five on the U.S. Billboard 200, The title track, "Lights and Sounds", was the first single, released a week before the album. It peaked at number four on the Billboard Hot Modern Rock Tracks.

October 16, 2006, the band re-entered the studio to begin pre-production on their next album. Paper Walls was released in the U.S. on July 17, 2007, the album debuted at number 13 on the U.S. Billboard 200 selling about 40,000 copies in its first week. The band spent the rest of the year promoting their new album nonstop from the point of its release while touring with Linkin Park and Blue October

On October 17, 2007, Mosely announced that he had decided to leave the band "to pursue other endeavors" and noted that he "will continue to support Yellowcard." He returned to his home in Jacksonville to pursue academia and take a hiatus from performing music.

=== This Legend (2016) ===
On December 19, 2016, the band announced that Mosely would join their lineup as their bassist. They played at Jack Rabbits in Jacksonville, FL on December 23, 2016.

== Other interests ==
Mosely is currently a triple major in music at Jacksonville University obtaining degrees in Music Business (B.S.), Commercial Music (B.A.) and Music Composition (B.M.). He performs regularly with the university ensembles including the choir, orchestra and jazz combos. In July 2012, he joined the newly formed Americana/Folk group Canary in the Coalmine, taking up duties on upright bass, vocals, keyboards, and percussion. The band is preparing for a release of their full-length record in 2015. The yet-to-be-titled album was produced, recorded and engineered by Matt Grondin at the Parlor Recording Studio in New Orleans, LA. Canary has been a recurring guest artist at the annual Spirit of the Suwannee Music Park festivals Magnoliafest and Springfest. In between the acts, he has been working and the writing for a new Inspection 12 full-length album and has performed as a solo singer/songwriter with a string quartet under the name Peter Michael.

== Discography ==
With Inspection 12

- Eponymous EP (1995)
- Come, Hefe, Come! (1996)
- Inspection 12 (1997)
- You're A Nation (1998)
- Step Into the Fire (1999)
- Home (2000)
- In Recovery (2001)
- Get Rad (2003)
- Redefine (2014)

See also: Yellowcard discography

With Yellowcard

- Ocean Avenue (2003)
- Lights and Sounds (2006)
- Paper Walls (2007)
