= 2012 (disambiguation) =

2012 was a leap year starting on Sunday of the Gregorian calendar.

2012 may also refer to:

== Popular culture ==
=== Film and television ===
- 2012 (film), a 2009 disaster film by Roland Emmerich
- Any one of a series of direct-to-DVD disaster films by The Asylum:
  - 2012: Doomsday (2008)
  - 2012: Supernova (2009)
- 2012: Kurse a di Xtabai (Curse of the Xtabai), a Belizean Creole-language supernatural thriller
- 2012: Time for Change, a 2010 feature-length documentary film
- Twenty Twelve, a comedy series about the 2012 Summer Olympics

=== Music ===
- 2012 (1982 album), 2012
- 2012 (Loudness album), 2012
- 2012 (Mukimukimanmansu album), 2012
- 2012 (Chixdiggit EP), 2016
- 2012 (Ruff Sqwad EP), 2012
- "2012 (It Ain't the End)", a song by Jay Sean, featuring Nicki Minaj
- "2012" (Chris Brown song), a song by Chris Brown from his album Fortune
- "2012", a song by The Word Alive from their album Deceiver
- "2012", a song by Burnt by the Sun from their album The Perfect Is the Enemy of the Good
- "2012", a song by Gossip from their album Music for Men
- "2012", a song by Ill Niño from the Enigma
- "2012", a song by Will Wood and the Tapeworms from their album Self-Ish
- "Fast Forward To 2012", a song by A Day To Remember from their album For Those Who Have Heart
- "2012: The Demise of the 5th Sun", a song by Scar Symmetry from Symmetric in Design
- "2012 (The Pillage)", a song by Dälek from Gutter Tactics
- "2012: Return of the Feathered Serpent", a song by Therion from Sitra Ahra
- "2012 (If The World Would End)", a song by Mike Candys, featuring Evelyn and Patrick Miller, from Smile

== Other ==
- 2012 phenomenon, metaphysical prediction centered on December 21, 2012
- The 2012 Summer Olympics, held in London, United Kingdom
- The 2012 United States presidential election
- CR2012, a type of a lithium button cell battery
- Windows Server 2012, a server operating system made by Microsoft
