= Sansai (disambiguation) =

Sansai may refer to:

- Sansai, wild mountain vegetables used in Japanese cuisine
- Sansai Books, a manga publisher
- Sansai Station, a railway station in Nagano, Japan
- Sansai Zue, a Chinese encyclopedia compiled and completed during the Ming Dynasty

== See also ==
- Sensei (disambiguation)
- San Sai (disambiguation), several places in Thailand
