= Get Rad =

Studio album by Inspection 12
- Released: September 2, 2003 (DIY); March 22, 2004 (Floppy Cow)
- Recorded: August 2002 – August 2003 at Hole of the Pigeon, Jacksonville, Florida
- Genre: Pop punk, cow punk
- Length: 1.03.24
- Label: Takeover, Floppy Cow, Suburban Home
- Producer: Paul Lapinski

Inspection 12 chronology
In Recovery (2001)	Get Rad (2003)

International cover

Professional ratings
Review scores
Source	Rating
Punknews.org	4.5/5 stars
Static Domain	5/5 stars
DoublePeace	3/5 stars

Get Rad is Inspection 12's sixth full-length album. It was released independently in 2003. In 2004, it was released internationally by Floppy Cow Records and in the US by Suburban Home Records. Takeover Records rereleased it with the original artwork in 2005. Unlike their previous recordings, Get Rad deviates quite a bit from the usual punk rock sound, incorporating a lot of unorthodox instruments for the genre, containing elements of folk rock and bluegrass.

== Track listing ==
1. "Homesick" – 4:10
2. "Coup de Grace" – 4:59
3. "Feelin' Like Freddie" – 4:22
4. "Labels are for Cans" – 4:43
5. "Again" – 3:52
6. "In the Dark" – 4:08
7. "The Naked at School Dream" – 3:40
8. "Everyday" – 4:20
9. "Out of My League" – 3:37
10. "I Hate Soap Operas" – 2:11
11. "A Better Friend" – 0:45
12. "Reckoned Wrong" – 1:01
13. "Terrified" – 2:25
14. "You Can Call Me Al" – 3:44
15. "Home" – 3:18
16. "I'm Fine; I Can Drive" – 3:42
17. "Nothing to Lose" – 8:27

=== Performance credits ===
==== Band ====
- Timothy John Grisnik – drums, percussion and vocals
- Peter Michael Mosely – guitar, piano, organ and vocals
- Daniel McCormick McLintock – vocals, bass guitar and guitar

==== Additional musicians ====
- Tina Rodas – cello
- Bobby Davis – French horn, "Again"
- Kyle David Hlubek – guitar, "Labels are for Cans"
- Christopher Matthew Grondin – guitar, "Feelin' Like Freddie" and "You Can Call Me Al"
- James Ardolino – percussion, "The Naked at School Dream"
- Kevin Valent – percussion, "The Naked at School Dream"
- Amanda Marie Hill – vocals, "Homesick", "You Can Call Me Al" and "Coup de Grace"
- Mark O'Quinn – vocals, "Homesick"
- Jonas Ted Bond – vocals, "In the Dark"
- Ryan Key – vocals, "Nothing to Lose"
- Jonathan "J-Bag" Farmand – Yahtzee, "Everyday"

=== Technical credits ===
- Paul Vincent Lapinski – engineering, mixing, mastering
- Daryl Phenneger – assistant engineering
