= Purr (album) =

1999 studio album by Dance Hall Crashers

Studio album by Dance Hall Crashers
- Released: August 24, 1999
- Recorded: 1999
- Studios: Fantasy Studios (Berkeley, California)
- Genres: Ska punk, pop punk, grunge
- Length: 33:25
- Label: Pink and Black
- Producers: Dance Hall Crashers; Fat Mike

Dance Hall Crashers chronology
Honey, I'm Homely! (1997)	Purr (1999)

Purr is the fourth and final studio album by American ska punk band Dance Hall Crashers, released on August 24, 1999. The album was produced by Fat Mike of NOFX and by the band itself and contains pop-punk, rock, and punk elements. Purr was released by Pink and Black Records, a subsidiary imprint label of Fat Wreck Chords, and was the label's first album. The album was given a Japanese-exclusive release on November 17, 1999, with three new songs. A deluxe version of the album was released on November 6, 2026. The album received mixed to positive reviews.

== Background ==
Dance Hall Crashers had left MCA Records prior to Purr having previously recorded Lockjaw and Honey, I'm Homely! with them in 1995 and 1997. Their exit from MCA was attributed to losing creative independence following the termination of several MCA executives. At the time of the release of Purr, DHC was the only band on the Pink and Black label. The album took two weeks to record, and was mixed in nearly that same amount of time. Vocalist Elyse Rogers credited the album's musical direction of ska, pop, and punk with her favorite ska and punk bands growing up, such as The Specials, The Clash, The Beatles, and The Jam. "Cricket," the last song on the album, is the band's first acoustic song on a studio album which is about a childhood fear of dust. Guitarist Jason Hammon told The San Diego Union-Tribune that the band was not going to carbon copy its previous record. He declared Honey, I'm Homely as "more experimental to us," and also asserted that the album's musical direction would be more akin to Lockjaw. "This album goes back to that, maybe even a little harder than the way Lockjaw sounded," he elaborated.

=== 2026 Deluxe release ===
It was announced on October 8, 2026 on the band's social media platforms that they would be releasing an extended version of the album entitled Purr Deluxe. The compilation, released by Fat Wreck Chords, includes all songs from the original print plus the three songs exclusive to only the Japanese release plus four lost and recovered songs. The cover art for the new release was created by The Simpsons cartoonist Sam Grinberg. The album was released digitally on November 6, 2026. In an interview with Hollow Suns vocalist Shuhei Dohi, Karina Deniké justified the creation of the deluxe album based on the band finding four unreleased songs and wanting to make a compilation album that was accessible to everyone. Elyse Rogers said in the same interview that she had no memory of the four songs. In another interview with Japanese music platform BARKS ahead of the band's scheduled appearance at Air Jam in November, Deniké indicated that the four lost and then-unreleased songs were recorded in a separate session around 2002. One of the songs, "Don't Call," was performed in 2004 as part of The Show Must Go Off! series.

== Critical reception ==
Karina Deniké said in an interview with Deseret News that some of DHC's fans criticized their hardcore elements, but she avowed that fellow ska band Madness also mixed up their music. She continued by referring to ska music as "a melting pot" and that the band tries to do the opposite of what people tell them to musically and to 'push the envelope' in regard to the acoustic track "Cricket." Dave Thompson in his 2000 book, Alternative Rock, described the album as mixing the sound of Honey, I'm Homely! into punk and skanking rhythms with some of the band's best and most serious lyrics.

Professional ratings
Review scores
Source	Rating
AllMusic	4.5/5 stars
In Music We Trust	C
Punknews.org	3.5/5 stars
The San Diego Union-Tribune	3/4 stars

Jo-Ann Greene of AllMusic gave the album 4.5 stars out of 5 praising producer Fat Mike along with mixer Tim Palmer. She further commended the opening song, "Beverly Kills," for its "rumbling drums and ferocious guitar licks," along with songs such as "The Real You," "Remember to Breathe," "Setting Sun," and "Cat Fight." Mark Jenkins of The Washington Post also complimented the album, particularly how he viewed the 'griping' in their lyrics as 'congenial' and how it was "delivered with such delight." He also called the album's music "brisk, tuneful, and poised." Kelso Jacks of CMJ viewed Purr as "an exhilarating good time marked by the band's rascally spirit." She also referred to the album as "12 boisterous, ska-infused pop-punk jolts." In anticipation of a concert featuring the band, the OC Weekly wrote an article about the band and their album and praised their lyrics and harmonies, particularly on the songs "Beverly Kills," "Do You Think You're Beautiful," and "Cat Fight."

While William Nakashima of The Orange County Register gave DHC credit for their "uncanny ability for crafting the almighty pop hook," he viewed Purr as tame compared to their previous two albums. "The hooks and boundless energy ... are now curiously missing." Nakashima did praise "Beverly Kills," "The Real You," and "Catfight," but referred to the whole album as a 'subtle swan song.' Alex Steininger of In Music We Trust gave the album a C grade, applauding Elyse Rogers and Karina Deniké for having the talent to turn a "typical, overdone pop-punk sound beaten to death" in "The Real You" into a harmony-filled song. However, the latter half of the album aside from "Cricket" was criticized and viewed as "bring[ing] the band below the mediocrity line."

Purr was slammed by Zac Crain of Dallas Observer who declared that the band was "back in the minors again" and that the album, along with Honey, I'm Homely!, should have been "culled from the recycling bin." He further observed the two albums as having 'reconfigured versions' of their previous songs and them making Lockjaw appear as a weak album.

== Track listing ==
All tracks are written by Dance Hall Crashers (Elyse Rogers, Karina Deniké, Jason Hammon, Mikey Weiss and Gavin Hammon).

No.	Title	Length
1.	"Beverly Kills"	2:31
2.	"Setting Sun"	2:47
3.	"The Real You"	2:40
4.	"Everything to Lose"	2:56
5.	"Just Like That"	2:23
6.	"Remember to Breathe"	2:47
7.	"Make Her Purr"	2:20
8.	"Do You Think You're Beautiful"	2:32
9.	"Nothing Left to Say"	3:02
10.	"Won't Be the Same"	3:16
11.	"Cat Fight"	2:34
12.	"Cricket"	3:37
Total length:		33:25

=== Japanese release ===
"Nothing Left to Say" is omitted from the original 1999 Japanese release.

All tracks are written by Dance Hall Crashers (Elyse Rogers, Karina Deniké, Jason Hammon, Mikey Weiss and Gavin Hammon).

No.	Title	Release notes	Length
1.	"Beverly Kills"		2:31
2.	"Setting Sun"		2:47
3.	"The Real You"		2:40
4.	"Everything to Lose"		2:56
5.	"Just Like That"		2:23
6.	"Remember to Breathe"		2:47
7.	"Make Her Purr"		2:20
8.	"Do You Think You're Beautiful"		2:32
9.	"No Heart"	Japanese release	2:19
10.	"Please Don't Look Away"	Japanese release	3:07
11.	"Sick As a Bat"	Japanese release	3:15
12.	"Won't Be the Same"		3:16
13.	"Cat Fight"		2:34
14.	"Cricket"		3:37
Total length:			39:04

=== Purr Deluxe ===
All tracks are written by Dance Hall Crashers (Elyse Rogers, Karina Deniké, Jason Hammon, Mikey Weiss and Gavin Hammon).

No.	Title	Release notes	Length
1.	"Beverly Kills"		2:31
2.	"Setting Sun"		2:47
3.	"The Real You"		2:40
4.	"Everything to Lose"		2:56
5.	"Just Like That"		2:23
6.	"Remember to Breathe"		2:47
7.	"No Heart"	Japanese release	2:19
8.	"Please Don't Look Away"	Japanese release	3:07
9.	"Make Her Purr"		2:20
10.	"Do You Think You're Beautiful"		2:32
11.	"Nothing Left to Say"		3:02
12.	"Won't Be the Same"		3:16
13.	"Cat Fight"		2:34
14.	"Sick As a Bat"	Japanese release	3:15
15.	"Cricket"		3:37
16.	"Ambush"	Deluxe release	2:57
17.	"Don't Call"	Deluxe release	2:56
18.	"Unremembering"	Deluxe release	2:18
19.	"Record Collector"	Deluxe release	3:07
Total length:			53:24

== Personnel ==
Information adapted from liner notes.

Dance Hall Crashers

- Elyse Rogers – vocals, management
- Karina Deniké – vocals
- Jason Hammon – guitar
- Mikey Weiss – bass guitar
- Gavin Hammon – drums

Production

- Fat Mike - producer
- Dance Hall Crashers - producer
- Tim Palmer – mixing engineer
- Frank Rinella – recording engineer
- Eddy Schreyer – mastering engineer

Artwork

- Coco Shinomiya – art direction
- Derek Dale – photography
- Sam Grinberg - cover art (Purr Deluxe)

== Charts ==
=== Weekly charts ===
Purr peaked at #21 on the CMJ Radio 200 chart in its fifth week on the list on October 18, 1999. DHC ranked second behind only Breakbeat Era in CMJ's Radio 200 Adds for September 20, 1999, with their music's addition on 76 radio stations across the United States.

Chart (1999)	Peak position
CMJ	21
