= Homecoming (Craig's Brother album) =

Studio album by Craig's Brother
- Released: May 19, 1998
- Recorded: West Beach Studios, Hollywood, California
- Genre: Punk rock, pop punk, melodic hardcore, skate punk
- Label: Tooth & Nail Records
- Producer: Donnell Cameron

Craig's Brother chronology
Keepin' It Real (1997)	Homecoming (1998)	Lost At Sea (2001)

Professional ratings
Review scores
Source	Rating
HM	(not rated) link

Homecoming is Craig's Brother's first full-length album, released on May 19, 1998, through Tooth & Nail Records.

== Track listing ==
No.	Title	Lyrics	Music	Length
1.	"Insult To Injury"	T. Bond	T. Bond	3:23
2.	"Going Blind"	T. Bond	A. Snyder	2:45
3.	"In Memory"	A. Nigh	A. Nigh	2:42
4.	"Homecoming"	A. Snyder	A. Snyder	2:57
5.	"Nobody"	A. Snyder	A. Snyder	3:27
6.	"Lonely Girl"	T. Bond	T. Bond	3:08
7.	"Who Am I?"	A. Nigh	A. Nigh	3:09
8.	"Sorry"	A. Snyder	A. Snyder	3:21
9.	"Dear Charlotte"	T. Bond	T. Bond	2:23
10.	"My Annie"	A. Nigh	A. Nigh	3:04
11.	"One"	A. Snyder	A. Snyder	3:59
12.	"Potential"	T. Bond	T. Bond	3:15
