= Lost at Sea (album) =

Lost At Sea

Studio album by Craig's Brother
- Released: February 27, 2001
- Recorded: Greenhouse Studios, Vancouver, British Columbia, Canada
- Genre: Punk rock
- Label: Tooth & Nail Records
- Producer: Darren Grahn

Craig's Brother chronology
Homecoming (1998)	Lost At Sea (2001)	E.P.idemic (2004)

Lost At Sea is Craig's Brother's second full-length album, released on July 17, 2001, their final release with Tooth & Nail Records. The violin part on "Back and Forth" was performed by Sean Mackin from Yellowcard, the band which ex-Craig's Brother member Ryan Key had recently joined.

== Aftermath ==
The additional cost for the choir during the opening track "Glory" got them into a quarrel with Tooth & Nail, and when a photograph was posted on the band's website gallery of the drummer Juice Cabrera giving the finger to the camera earned them complaints from bookstores operated by The Family, the animosity between the band and the label reached its climax and Craig's Brother were finally dropped by Tooth & Nail Records.

The finished album was left unreleased with the company, where it lingered for nearly a year. When it was finally pressed in 2001, the distribution was scarce and the marketing was non-existent. Record outlets would usually only stock the album at the customer's requests, and at the turn of the new millennium, online shopping was only starting to become commonplace, so fans outside the US had a hard time trying to purchase the album. Without any promotion or backing, sales were expectedly disappointing, and later in 2001, Craig's Brother disbanded.

== Track listing ==
No.	Title	Lyrics	Music	Length
1.	"Glory"	T. Bond	A. Snyder	4:53
2.	"Lullaby"	T. Bond	T. Bond	3:10
3.	"Masonic"	D. McClintock	D. McClintock	3:53
4.	"Divorce"	T. Bond	A. Snyder	3:13
5.	"Head in a Cloud"	T. Bond	T. Bond	3:20
6.	"Back and Forth"	D. McClintock & T. Bond	D. McClintock & T. Bond	4:19
7.	"Falling Out"	T. Bond	T. Bond	3:29
8.	"Set Free"	T. Bond	T. Bond	2:55
9.	"Prince of America"	T. Bond	D. McClintock & T. Bond	3:04
10.	"Lost at Sea"	T. Bond	T. Bond	7:09
