= In Recovery =

Studio album by Inspection 12
- Released: May 29, 2001
- Recorded: December 2000
- Studio: Hole of the Pigeon, Jacksonville, Florida
- Genre: Punk rock
- Length: 35:23
- Label: Honest Don's
- Producer: Paul Lapinski, Jay Peele and Inspection 12

Inspection 12 chronology
Home (2000)	In Recovery (2001)	Get Rad (2003)

Professional ratings
Review scores
Source	Rating
AllMusic	4.5/5 stars
Punknews.org	4/5 stars

In Recovery is the fifth studio album by American pop punk band Inspection 12, released on May 29, 2001, through Honest Don's.

It was the final recording with drummer Scott Shad, who died a few months before the album's release.

== Critical reception ==
AllMusic wrote: "Inspection 12's core sound may be melodic punk, awash in harmonies, but they add some intriguing variations to the genre. Screaming guitar solos are not that unique, but it's not everyday [sic] one finds a cello opening a punk track, nor a Gregorian-esque chant closing one out."

== Track listing ==
1. "Secure" – 2:35
2. "Sweet Sixteen" – 1:35
3. "Red Letter Day" – 3:38
4. "Doppelganger" – 1:30
5. "Secret Identity" – 3:05
6. "Great Scott" – 2:27
7. "Leave It To Me" – 3:44
8. "Hear Anything?" – 2:49
9. "Photograph" – 3:20
10. "Immortal Beloved" – 2:08
11. "To The Victor Go The Spoils" – 2:14
12. "Elegy" – 6:18

== Performance credits ==
Inspection 12

- Dan McLintock – vocals, bass guitar, guitar, moog
- Pete Mosely – guitar, vocals, organ, piano
- James Trimble – guitar, vocals
- Scott Shad – drums, vocals, percussion

Additional musicians

- Sean Mackin – violin
- Angus Cooke – cello
- Tina Rodas – cello
- Bobby Davis – trumpet
- Tad Hilton – trombone
- Anthony Norton – saxophone
- Will Blumberg – tribal drumming
- Anastasia Specker – backing vocals on "Photograph"
- Todd – backing vocals on "Sweet Sixteen"
- Tracy Densford – backing vocals on "Sweet Sixteen"
- Joey Cape – backing vocals on "Red Letter Day"
- Rob Reid – backing vocals on "Leave It To Me"
- Jordan McDowell – backing vocals on "Leave It To Me"
- Mark O'Quinn – backing vocals on "Hear Anything?"
- Jason Lewis – backing vocals on "Hear Anything?"

Technical credits

- Angust Cooke – mixer at Orange Whip Studios in Santa Barbara, California, in December 2000
- Mark Casselman – mastering engineer at New American Sound, in February 2001
