= Honey, I'm Homely! =

1997 studio album by the Dance Hall Crashers

Studio album by Dance Hall Crashers
- Released: September 9, 1997
- Recorded: 1997
- Studios: Fantasy Studios (Berkeley, California); NRG Studios (North Hollywood, California)
- Genres: Ska punk; pop punk
- Length: 44:10
- Label: MCA
- Producers: Dance Hall Crashers; Stoker

Dance Hall Crashers chronology
Lockjaw (1995)	Honey, I'm Homely! (1997)	Purr (1999)

Honey, I'm Homely! is the third studio album by the American ska punk band Dance Hall Crashers. Produced by the band and Stoker, the album was released on September 9, 1997 by MCA Records.

== Background ==
Dance Hall Crashers signed to MCA's new 510 subsidiary in 1995 and released Lockjaw, highlighting the band's increasing direction into a punchier, pop punk style. Prior to recording Honey, I'm Homely!, DHC toured with bands such as Blink-182, The Mighty Mighty Bosstones, and a host of Epitaph punk bands.

Honey, I'm Homely! marked the return of brass instruments to DHC for the first time since their debut album of the same name released in 1990 (subsequent rereleases in 1993 and 1996) after a notable absence in Lockjaw. Hepcat members Kincaid Smith and Efren Santana played the trumpet and saxophone respectively on select songs.

The album art conveys 1950s American culture through the cover's clothing and hairstyles present, which Elyse Rogers characterized (the time period) as "such a rad time for music." The woman's hair is of a similar style to model Paula Turnbull who is present on Rush's Permanent Waves album cover. Rogers described DHC's three albums at the time–Dance Hall Crashers, Lockjaw, and Honey, I'm Homely!–as "a triangle" concerning music styles, with the first being third-wave ska and the second pop-punk. "This album, we said, 'let's try to not play everything at a punk pace'...right now we're probably having more fun than we've ever had," Rogers elaborated.

== Critical reception ==
Professional ratings
Review scores
Source	Rating
AllMusic	4.5/5 stars
The Tampa Tribune	3/4 stars
The Knoxville News-Sentinel	3/5 stars
Dayton Daily News	2/4 stars
Austin American-Statesman	2/5 stars

Dave Younk, music critic of the St. Cloud Times, praised Honey, I'm Homely!, calling the album "...intoxicating and marvelously entertaining." Younk called the album's music "a blend of ska and 1960s girl-group harmonies." The Tampa Tribune's Kevin Walker commended the album, especially highlighting the 2:55 mark of the opening song, "Lost Again," when the vocal duo repeatedly sing "do you?" until the song's conclusion. Walker described Rogers’ and Deniké’s singing as "dominant," comparing them to Kate Pierson and Cindy Wilson of the B-52s. He further described the album as "lyrically funny" and "smart, danceable fun." Chuck Campbell of The Knoxville News-Sentinel gave the album a mostly positive review, and, like Kevin Walker, also compared the quintet to the B-52s: "...Honey, I'm Homely is a good-time blast worth more than a few listens." Campbell further expressed "...the lyrics are good-natured if impetuous," and "...the pace is planned like a roller-coaster, with hyper-accelerated thrills spread out among more traditional high-speed fare." In a review for The A.V. Club, Stephen Thompson described the album as "packed literally end to end with infectious potential radio hits." He further noted: "Like a peppier, more self-assured No Doubt, DHC spares us the morose ballads and kicks out 15 foot-tapping featherweights, with scant few clunkers like the inane 'Elvis & Me' to weigh things down."

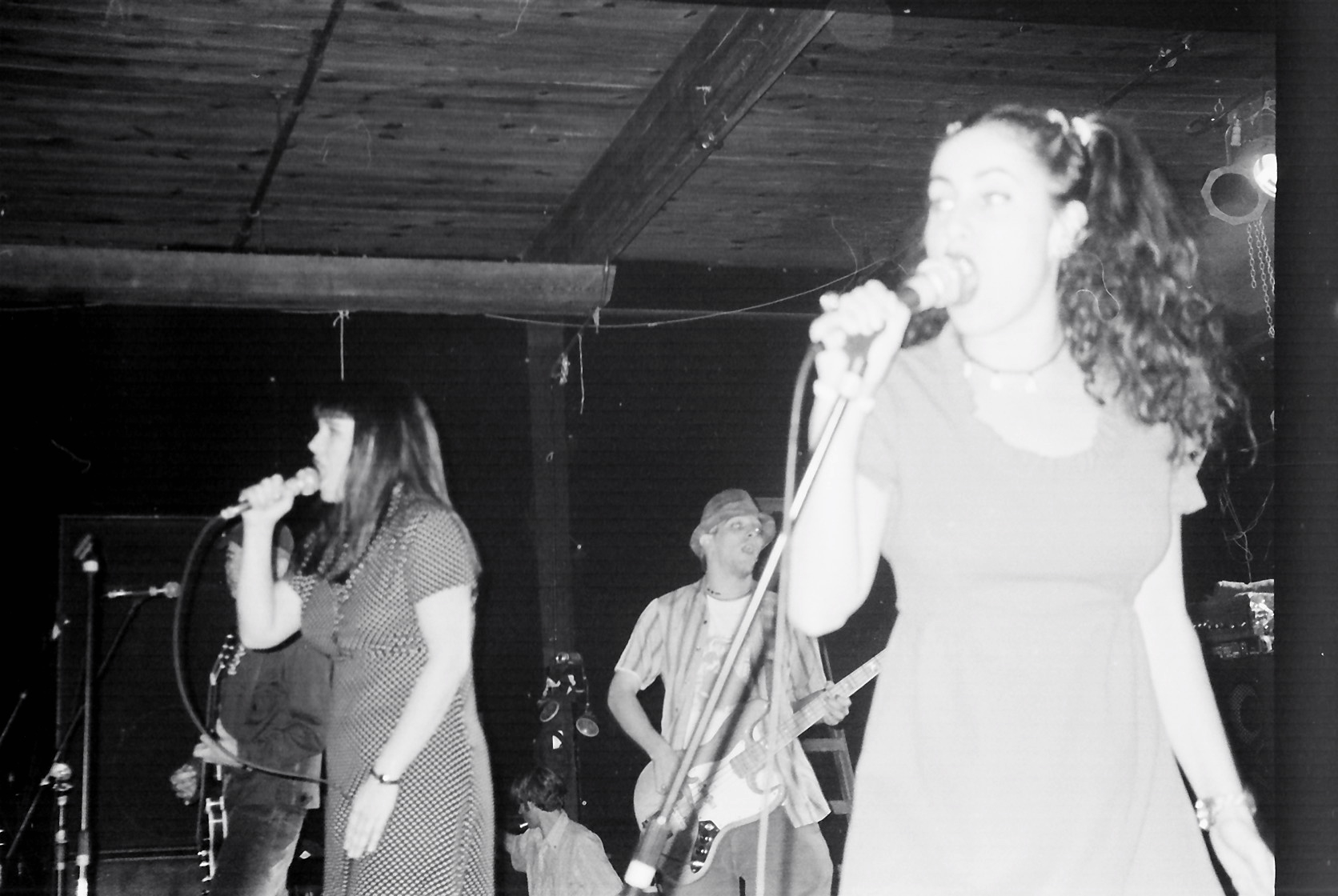
The Dance Hall Crashers perform at The Masquerade in Atlanta, Georgia, in 1998.

The fifteen-track album was panned by John Prendergast of The Rocket (Seattle, WA), who accused the band of "...(sounding like) No Doubt's rich cousins who got together to make a record out of boredom." He further criticized Rogers and Deniké for singing in repetition: "...hearing them in harmony in the same fifths and thirds over and over makes you want to choke." Prendergast ended his review by referring to the band and its album as "unoriginal."

== Track listing ==
All tracks are written by Dance Hall Crashers (Elyse Rogers, Karina Deniké, Jason Hammon, Mikey Weiss and Gavin Hammon).

No.	Title	Length
1.	"Lost Again"	3:24
2.	"Will Tomorrow Ever Come"	2:40
3.	"All Mine"	3:22
4.	"Salted"	2:26
5.	"Next to You"	2:58
6.	"I Want It All"	3:18
7.	"Elvis & Me"	2:47
8.	"Whisky & Gin"	3:19
9.	"Cold Shower"	2:27
10.	"Last Laugh"	2:55
11.	"Mr. Blue"	2:40
12.	"Stand By"	2:53
13.	"The Truth About Me"	3:29
14.	"Big Mouth"	2:32
15.	"Over Again"	3:00
Total length:		44:10

== Personnel ==
Information adapted from liner notes.

Dance Hall Crashers

- Elyse Rogers – vocals, management, production
- Karina Deniké – vocals, production
- Jason Hammon – guitar, production
- Mikey Weiss – bass guitar, production
- Gavin Hammon – drums, percussion, production

Additional musicians

- Kincaid Smith – trumpet on "Salted," "Next to You," "Cold Shower," and "The Truth About Me"
- Efren Santana – saxophone on "All Mine," "Salted," "Next to You," "Cold Shower," and "The Truth About Me"
- Travis Lawmaster – piano on "Next to You"

Production

- Tim Palmer – mixing engineer
- Mark O'Donoughue – mixing engineer
- Frank Rinella – recording engineer
- Stoker – recording engineer, production
- Howie Weinberg – mastering engineer

Artwork

- William George – cover illustration
- Coco Shinomiya – art direction
- Chris Cuffaro – photography

== Charts ==
Chart (1997)	Peak position
US Top Heatseekers (Billboard)	22

== See also ==
- It Means Everything – album by ska punk band Save Ferris, released on the same day
