= Chixdiggit =

Canadian pop punk band

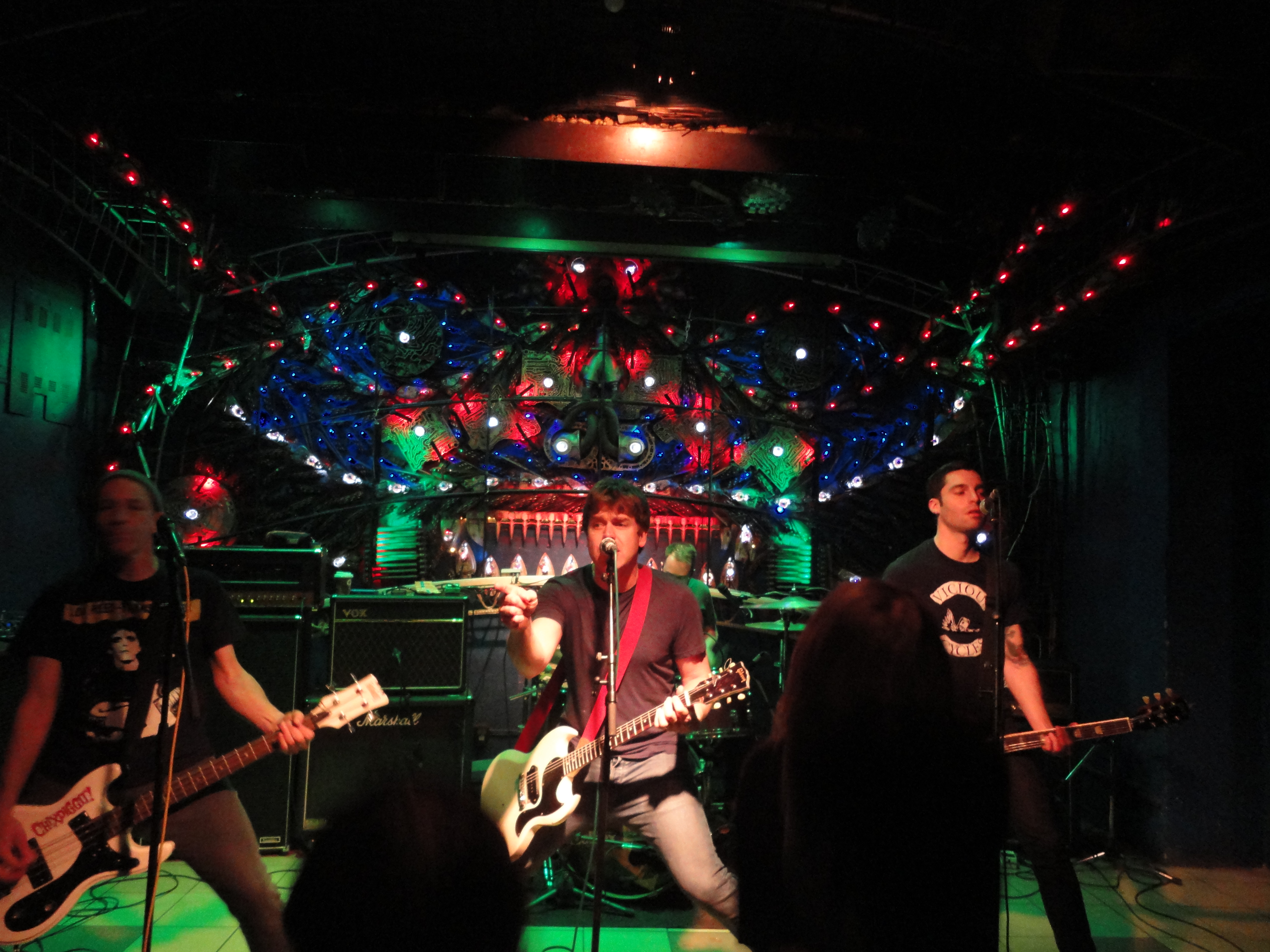

Background information
- Origin: Calgary, Alberta, Canada
- Genres: Punk rock, pop punk
- Years active: 1991–present
- Labels: Sub Pop; Fat Wreck Chords; Lance Rock
- Members: KJ Jansen; Mark O'Flaherty; Billy Dixon; Tyler Pickering; Rob Gruszecki
- Website: chixdiggit.com

Chixdiggit (/tʃɪksˈdɪɡɪt/ chiks-DIG-it) is a Canadian pop punk band formed in Calgary, Alberta. The band performed internationally, and released a number of studio albums, mainly with light-hearted pop-punk songs, usually about girls and relationships.

== History ==
In 1990, K.J. Jansen, Mark O'Flaherty and Mike Eggermont started selling T-shirts imprinted with the Chixdiggit logo at their high-school, although at this stage the band did not exist. Sales of the shirts provided the band with enough money to purchase a drum kit. However, none of the band members had any musical experience nor did any of the members own instruments (except O'Flaherty who owned a classical guitar). Eggermont took up playing bass and Jansen took up playing guitar as well as becoming the lead vocalist for the band.

By 1991, the three had formed the band and they started playing a few shows in 1992 while working on their instrumental skills. By 1993, the band was playing regularly in venues around Calgary. In 1995, they performed at a large concert in Seattle, opening for the band 'The Presidents of the United States of America'.

In 1996, Chixdiggit were signed to Sub Pop records. They released their first self-titled album on the record label that year, but they only lasted a short time on the label.

At this stage Chixdiggit was touring worldwide. They were soon signed to Honest Don's Records, a Fat Wreck Chords subsidiary from San Francisco.

After the release of 2000's From Scene to Shining Scene, the band took a hiatus, from which they returned in 2003, and in 2005 the band started writing and recording its fourth full-length album, Pink Razors. The album was released April 19, 2005, on Fat Wreck Chords in North American and Bad Taste Records in Europe.

Mike Eggermont left the band in 2002 and started a software company. In 2003, drummer Dave Alcock (owner of Sundae Sound recording studio) left the band, and was replaced by the band's original drummer, Jason Hirsch.

In June and July 2006, they played a handful of European shows, before playing a couple of Californian shows with the Groovie Ghoulies. They went on a European tour with Riff Randells in October 2007. On October 31, 2007, the band released a re-recording of their debut album, Chixdiggit!, on Bad Taste Records. The re-recorded album was titled Chixdiggit! II.

In 2011, Chixdiggit released a 6-song EP titled Safeways Here We Come released in North America by Fat Wreck Chords.

Former drummer Dave Alcock died in Calgary on January 1, 2023, at the age of 47. His death was announced via the band's official Facebook page.

== Band members ==
=== Current ===
- KJ Jansen - guitar, vocals
- Mark O'Flaherty - guitar, vocals
- Tyler Pickering - drums
- Billy Dixon - Guitar, vocals
- Rob Gruszecki - Bass, vocals

=== Former ===
- Mike Eggermont - bass, vocals (1991–2000)
- Dave Alcock - drums (1997–2003; died 2023)
- Jason Hirsch- drums (1991–1997, 2003–2007)
- Mike McLeod - bass, vocals
- Kepi Ghoulie - bass, vocals
- Jimmy James - bass, guitar, vocals
- BJ Downey - Bass, vocals

== Discography ==
=== Studio albums ===
- 1996 - Chixdiggit! (Sub Pop Records)
- 1998 - Born on the First of July (Honest Don's Records)
- 2000 - From Scene to Shining Scene (Honest Don's Records)
- 2005 - Pink Razors
- 2007 - Chixdiggit! II

=== EPs ===
- 2011 - Safeways Here We Come
- 2016 - 2012

=== Cassettes ===
- 1993 - Humped (self-released)

=== 7"s ===
- 1995 - Best Hung Carrot (Lance Rock Records)
  - 1999 - Best Hung Carrot in the Fridge and Other Songs (CD, Delmonico Records)
  - 2000 - Best Hung Carrot in the Fridge (10" vinyl, Rock & Roll Inc.)
- 1996 - Shadowy Bangers from a Shadowy Duplex (Sub Pop Records)
- 1997 - Chupa Cabra (Honest Don's Records)

=== Splits ===
- 1998 - Chronic for the Troops - split with Groovie Ghoulies (Delmonico Records)

=== Music videos ===
- "Where's Your Mom?" (1996)
- "Chupacabras" (1998)
- "Spanish Fever" (2000)

=== Compilation appearances ===
- 1994 - Bloodbath at the Chinese Disco (Porn Star/Sloth Records) With Feist's former punk band "Placebo"
- 1996 - On Guard for Thee: a Collection of Canada's Youth Gone Bad (Au GoGo Records)
- 1996 - Pop Goes the Weasel, Vol. 2 (K.O.G.A. Records)
- 1997 - Honest Don's Welcome Wagon (Honest Don's Records)
- 1997 - Nothing beats a Royal Flush (Roto-Flex Records)
- 1998 - Wankin' in the Pit (CR Records Japan)
- 1998 - Happy Meals II (My Records)
- 1998 - Greatest Shits (Honest Don's Records)
- 1998 - ESPN X Games Pro Boarder (Radical Entertainment/EA Sports)
- 1999 - 70 Minutos: Full Time Hardcore (Tamborette Entertainment)
- 1999 - Short Music for Short People (Fat Wreck Chords)
- 1999 - My So-Called Punk Rock Life (Melted Records)
- 1999 - This is Bad Taste, Vol. 3 (Bad Taste Records)
- 2000 - More RPM's Than Floyd on a Scooter (Fat Wreck Chords)
- 2000 - AMP (Mack Dawg Productions)
- 2000 - Punk Chunks (LameAss Recordz)
- 2001 - 123-Punk (Mutt Records)
- 2002 - Honest Don's Dirty Dishes (Honest Don's Records)
- 2002 - FUBAR: The Album (Phantom Records)
- 2005 - Rock Against Floyd (Fat Wreck Chords)
- 2010 - Harder, Fatter + Louder! (Fat Wreck Chords)

== See also ==
- List of bands from Canada
