= The Insidious Lie =

Studio album by Craig's Brother
- Released: January 24, 2011
- Recorded: DK2 Studios, Santa Cruz, California & The Compound, Felton, California
- Genre: Punk rock
- Length: 42.23
- Producer: Kyle Black, Andy Snyder, and Ted Bond

Craig's Brother chronology
E.P.idemic (2004)	The Insidious Lie (2011)

The Insidious Lie is Craig's Brother's third album. It was available for streaming in its entirety online at CraigsBrother.com on Christmas Day 2010, and then released on January 24, 2011, as a digital download. The song "Crutch" was omitted from the download version in order to be included as a bonus track on a Japanese release at a later date. According to vocalist Ted Bond, the record deals more directly with issues of spirituality, as they have come to re-evaluate their position as Christians and punk rockers, but it also deals with drug use and sex and war. "The Insidious Lie" was the title of an entry in the band's blog by Ted Bond from October 6, 2006, about the music industry.

"[...]In the former age there was an ideal business model that was based on a quality product. In this age the ideal business model is based on a good marketing department, as a result what we have wound up with is shit in a fancy box, which amounts to lower quality of life. But what's worse than the fact that we have seen a decline in the quality of life, is the fact the whole system has become dishonest. We now have a culture of dishonesty, everything you see and read in popular culture is an insidious attempt to make you buy something that you don't actually want. And when we participate in the insidious lie, when we believe the lie and act in the ways that we have been programmed to act we forfeit our status as free agents. We lose our souls.

But there is a counter culture, that's where punk rock comes in. Punk rock is considered a style of music, but it's not. If you listen to what was considered punk 25 years ago, and compare it to what is considered punk today, it's obvious that they are totally different styles of music. Punk Rock in its purest form is an ideology. It's a rejection of the insidious lie that has come to be status quo, and an embracing of honesty in the form of anti-status quo. [...]"

== Track listing ==
1. "Freedom" – 2:12
2. "Mistake Of Caring" – 3:51
3. "Thousand Yard Stare" – 4:03
4. "Klamath Falls" – 3:38
5. "Insidious Lie" – 3:31
6. "Party Girl" – 3:14
7. "Closure" – 3:14
8. "Fallen" – 3:13
9. "Adeline" - 3:29
10. "The Problem Of Evil" - 3:41
11. "The Aaronic Blessing (Peace on Earth)" - 5:15

== Personnel ==
=== Craig's Brother ===
- Ted Bond - Lead vocals and guitar
- Glade Wilson - Guitar and background vocals
- Scott Hrapoff - Bass
- Heath Konkel - Drums and background vocals

=== Featuring ===
- Andy Snyder - Guitar and background vocals
- Steven Neufeld - Guitar and background vocals
- Chris Merrit - Piano
- Erin Bond - Background vocals
- Adam Nigh - Background vocals
- Ryan Sabouhi - Background vocals

=== Technical credits ===
- Kyle Black - Producer, engineer at The Compound; mixing and mastering at Mike Green's studio
- Joe Clements - Engineer at The Compound
- Ryan Sabouhi - Assistant engineer at The Compound
- Andy Snyder - Co-producer, engineer, and mixing (Adaline only) at DK2 Studios and The Compound
- Ted Bond - Co-producer
