= Born on the First of July =

Studio album by Chixdiggit!
- Released: 1998
- Genre: Pop punk
- Label: Honest Don's
- Producer: Ryan Greene

Chixdiggit! chronology
| Chixdiggit! (1996) | Born on the First of July (1998) | From Scene to Shining Scene (2000) |

Born on the First of July is the second album by the Canadian pop punk band Chixdiggit, released in 1998. It was reissued in 2013.

The band supported the album by touring with, among others, the Groovie Ghoulies and the Hi-Fives. Its first single was "Chupacabras".

== Production ==
The album was produced by Ryan Greene. It was recorded at Sundae Sound, in Calgary, where the band's new drummer, Dave Alcock, worked as an engineer. Born on the First of July includes an unlisted cover version of Sylvia's "Nobody".

== Critical reception ==
Professional ratings
Review scores
| Source | Rating |
|---|---|
| AllMusic | 4/5 stars |
| Calgary Herald | 3.5/5 stars |
| Calgary Sun | 3.5/5 |
| Deseret News | 3/4 stars |
| MusicHound Rock: The Essential Album Guide | 2.5/5 stars |
| Punknews.org | 4/5 stars |

The Deseret News wrote that "Ryan Greene's production ups the crunch quotient and downplays the melodic side, but it doesn't detract too much." The Calgary Herald thought that there was "nothing fancy to this 13-track, 24-minute disc of rock for suburban punks."

The Hamilton Spectator deemed the album "snappy, melodic two-minute pop songs [with] a '77-era punk rock attack." The Windsor Star concluded that "Chixdiggit have produced a rollicking album that reflects the feeling of wild abandon they exude live." Broken Pencil called Born on the First of July "hard-driving classic Canadian rawk of the highest order ... Speedy loud guitars, action-arm drumming and husky, beer-tempered vocals deliver songs on summer fun, young love, and the first pangs of disillusionment."

AllMusic wrote: "They don't make pop-punk like this anymore. No emo overtones, no generic NOFX or Queers riffs to be found and no songs about crying over a girl who broke said person's heart."

== Track listing ==
All songs by KJ Jansen, unless otherwise noted.

1. Gettin' Air - 1:33
2. My Girl's Retro - 1:09
3. Sikome Beach - 1:49
4. Chupacabras - 2:00
5. Quit Your Job - 0:25
6. My Restaurant - 2:07
7. Julianne - 1:04
8. 20 Times - 2:28
9. Ohio - 1:44
10. Haven't Got Time For - 1:38
11. 2000 Flushes - 0:58
12. Brunette Summer - 4:33
13. Nobody (Kye Fleming, Dennis Morgan) - 2:11
  - Track 13 is unlisted.

== Musicians ==
- KJ Jansen - guitar, vocals
- Michael Eggermont - bass
- Mark O'Flaherty - guitar
- Dave Alcock - drums
