= One Mississippi (J Church album) =

Studio album by J Church
- Released: 2000
- Genre: Pop-punk
- Label: Honest Don's Records

J Church chronology
Altamont '99 (1998)	One Mississippi (2000)	Meaty, Beaty, Shitty Sounding (2001)

One Mississippi is an album by the pop-punk band J Church, released in 2000.

== Production ==
Founding bassist Gardner Maxam departed the band before recordings sessions began. Adam Pfahler played drums on One Mississippi. Frontman Lance Hahn had told Fat Wreck Chords that the album would be full of short, standard punk songs; he instead submitted a double album that incorporated a variety of musical styles.

== Critical reception ==
Professional ratings
Review scores
Source	Rating
AllMusic	3/5 stars
The San Diego Union-Tribune	2.5/4 stars
Martin C. Strong	5/10

The Palm Beach Post wrote: "Mixing elements of classic REM and Guided By Voices with its own punk style, the group is in top form ... Some of the tracks, 'No Jazz' and 'Quickstep', sound like instant classics." Creative Loafing deemed the album "shot through with acoustic piano, finely drawn character studies and those brainy namechecks, all tucked slyly within the safe confines of pop-punk."

AllMusic thought that "the group tumbles through everything from straight punk anthems to atypical marching-style progressions ... Hahn's vocals on this release sound even better than usual, and whether he's pushing the limit with a scream or two or singing quietly over a subdued acoustic guitar, his sharp wit and smooth delivery make for a highly engaging listen." PopMatters determined that the album "sounds like the band’s magnum opus: a sprawling, deeply personal masterpiece in the vein of other outsized classics like Hüsker Dü's Zen Arcade."

== Track listing ==
1. "No Jazz"
2. "New York Times Book Review"
3. "The Track"
4. "Where the Trains Go"
5. "Sunshine"
6. "Quickstep"
7. "Your Mother"
8. "She Says"
9. "Never Happy"
10. "She's So Mean"
11. "Diet Coke"
12. "Imaginary Friends"
13. "Anybody"
14. "I Reach for Her Hand"
15. "The Doctor"
16. "Cut the Shit"
17. "Leni Riefenstahl's Tinder Box"
18. "Sadie Mae Glutz"
19. "Jane, Vanessa and I"
20. "Gulf Breeze, Florida"
21. "The Devil and I"
22. "Rich and Young and Dumb"
23. "J Church Sucks"
24. "Reaching for Thoreau"
25. "Christmas Lights"
26. "Stars Are Exploding"

== Personnel ==
- Lance Hahn (vocals, guitar, piano)
- Adam Pfahler (drums, percussion)
- Jeff Bursley (bass guitar)
- Kelly Green (guest vocals on "The Track" and "Sunshine")
