= Dance Hall Crashers =

American ska punk band

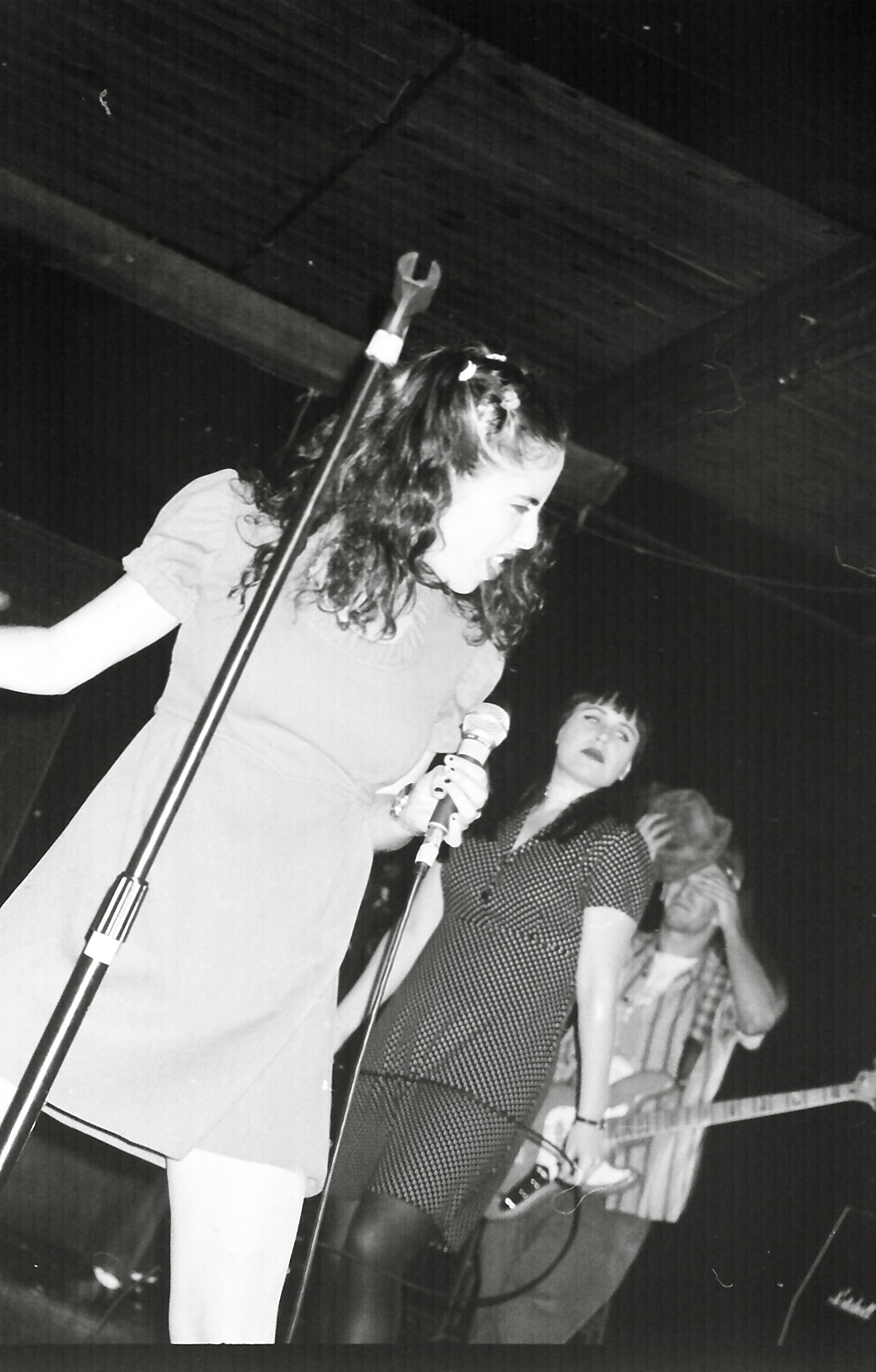
- Lead singers Karina Deniké (foreground) and Elyse Rogers (1998)

Background information
- Also known as: DHC
- Origin: Berkeley, California, United States
- Genres: Ska punk, pop punk
- Years active: 1989–1990; 1992–2004; 2025–present
- Labels: Moon Ska, MCA, Pink and Black
- Spinoff of: Operation Ivy
- Members: Elyse Rogers; Karina Deniké; Jason Hammon; Mikey Weiss; Gavin Hammon; Jon Graber
- Past members: Andrew Champion; Scott Goodell; Ingrid Jonsson; Leland McNeely; Tim Armstrong; Matt Freeman; Joel Wing; Erik Larsen aka Erik Kolacek; Joey Schaaf; J. Grant Mcintire; Alex Baker; Dean Olmstead; Dave Camp; John Pantle; Mason St. Peters; Mike Park

Dance Hall Crashers (often abbreviated to DHC) is an American ska punk band formed in 1989 in Berkeley, California. Initially founded by former Operation Ivy members Tim Armstrong and Matt Freeman, the band has had a fluid lineup over its career, with the most recent lineup including Elyse Rogers and Karina Deniké (Note: Known as Karina Schwarz prior to 1995.) on vocals, brothers Jason Hammon and Gavin Hammon on guitar and drums respectively, Mikey Weiss on bass, and recording engineer Jon Graber as a guitarist for select songs as of 2025. They have released four studio albums, highlighted by the 1995 release Lockjaw which featured the minor hit song "Enough", produced by Rob Cavallo and featured in the film Angus.

== Biography ==
=== Early years ===
The original incarnation of the Dance Hall Crashers (named after the Alton Ellis song "Dance Crasher") was formed in 1989 by Matt Freeman and Tim Armstrong, formerly of the seminal Bay Area ska-punk band Operation Ivy, after both musicians expressed an interest in starting a band rooted in more traditional ska and rocksteady than what they had been playing with Operation Ivy. The first line-up featured Armstrong on vocals and Freeman on guitar, as well as drummer Erik Larsen (whom they specifically lured away from a rocksteady band called "The Liquidators"). The band also featured keyboardist Joey Schaaf, vocalists Ingrid Jonsson and Andrew Champion, guitarist Grant McIntire, and bassist Joel Wing.

The band experimented with various songs and styles until they played their first show at 924 Gilman Street in Berkeley in 1989. Shortly after their debut, however, Freeman and Armstrong left to pursue other interests, mainly another punk-based ska project called Downfall.

After numerous membership changes which eventually left only the original drummer Larsen and bassist Wing, DHC solidified a line-up with dual vocalists Karina Schwarz and Elyse Rogers, guitarists Jason Hammon and Jaime McCormick, and drummer Gavin Hammon (Jason's brother). Following a period of steady gigging, DHC finally caught a break after being booked at an all-ska Earth Day festival at Berkeley's Greek Theatre in 1990, opening for Bad Manners. During this time they would occasionally open for The Toasters playing alongside other up-and-coming ska bands, including Let's Go Bowling. That year, the band recorded their self-titled debut album for Moon Ska Records, though trouble within the band led to a break-up soon after. Elyse Rogers revealed in a 1993 interview with the Honolulu Star-Bulletin prior to a show in Hawaii that part of the reason for the band's breakup was a result of much of the band being under 21 years of age at that time, which prohibited those members from leaving the backstage area during shows.

=== Breakthrough ===
Their debut album became a word-of-mouth underground hit even with the band disbanded, and the group reunited in 1991 at Slim's for a sold-out performance. In 1992, bowing to fan pressure, DHC reunited for a one-off series of gigs (occasionally playing alongside Hepcat), but after the positive response to their performance, the band chose to reform on a permanent basis. In 1993, to commemorate their reunion, Moon Records released a CD compilation of the band's entire body of work from 1989 to 1992, appropriately titled 1989–1992. The August 1993 lineup consisted of co-vocalists Elyse Rogers and Karina Schwarz, Jason Hammon and Scott Goodell on guitar and saxist Dean Olmstead; Rogers was also serving as Hepcat’s manager. A revised lineup in April 1994 added Jason Hammon's brother Gavin on drums, Mikey Weiss on bass (Note: The Honolulu Star-Bulletin erroneously lists both Gavin Hammon and Weiss as drummers, with no bassist.), plus John Pantle and Mason St. Peters as the horn section. "Go", which would later be incorporated into Lockjaw, was released exclusively to Hawaii in early-1994 as a cassette single.

As the band began touring nationally by the mid-1990s, the line-up changed once again, now featuring Rogers, Denike, Hammon, his brother Gavin Hammon on drums, guitarist Scott Goodell and bassist Mikey Weiss. In 1995, DHC were the very first group signed to MCA Records subsidiary 510 records, and issued their second LP Lockjaw the same year. Lockjaw was the first DHC release without a horn section, and had a harder, guitar-driven pop punk sound than the band's prior recordings. The album's single, "Enough", was featured on the soundtrack to the film Angus, and the accompanying music video received moderate airplay on MTV's 120 Minutes. Weiss recalls that he was working in a record store when Lockjaw was released; curious customers would ask about the band or their sound, and the other employees would point him out as the bass player.

A re-issue of 1989–1992 was released as The Old Record in late 1996 on Fat Wreck Chords' Honest Don's label. DHC's second MCA record, Honey, I'm Homely!, was released in 1997. This proved to be the band's breakthrough album, peaking at No. 22 on Billboard's Top Heatseekers. The leading singles "Lost Again" and "Mr. Blue" enjoyed steady rotation on local and college radio stations across the United States, and music videos were filmed for both tracks.

The band toured extensively throughout the mid to late 1990s, both as a headliner and opening for bands such as The Mighty Mighty Bosstones, Bad Religion, and The Lemons. In addition, the band played festivals such as the Warped Tour and Lilith Fair. Due to the heavy touring schedule, Scott Goodell bowed out from his guitar duties in 1996; the band asked Phil Ensor from Limp and later, Billy Bouchard to stand in for live shows until the need for a second guitarist was nixed and Hammon handled all guitar parts himself.

=== Hiatus and reunions ===
In 1998, DHC released their last release with MCA, the EP Blue Plate Special. The EP contained a short collection of songs recorded for other compilations/soundtracks, unreleased and remixed material, and a CD-ROM of photos and the band's four music videos. In 1999, the band signed with independent label Pink and Black Records, releasing their fourth LP Purr in 1999 and the live album The Live Record: Witless Banter and 25 Mildly Antagonistic Songs About Love in 2000. (Note: Recorded at The Troubadour in November 1999)

DHC started playing less frequently in the early 2000s as band members either pursued higher education or moved on with their careers outside the band. They limited their performances to West Coast and Hawaiian shows and occasional appearances at events such as the 2002 Winter Olympics in Salt Lake City. The band recorded a show at the Hollywood House of Blues which was later released on DVD by Kung Fu Records as part of their The Show Must Go Off! series, which was released in 2005.

=== 2025 reunion ===
On January 26, 2025, DHC’s official Facebook account posted a reel with the Indian-head test pattern “Please Stand By” test card (featuring their black and white logo) with “Arrived” by CYoung playing in the background. The following day, January 27, a teaser video featuring Kevin Lyman and Elyse Rogers revealed that the band would be playing at the Vans Warped Tour in Washington, DC, and Long Beach, CA, later in 2025, ending a 21-year hiatus for the band. Karina Deniké announced in a video on January 28 that DHC would also be performing a show at the Great American Music Hall in San Francisco on June 7. The official announcement also stated that no more shows would be added, saying "If you are waiting for more announcements, they will not be coming. No other festivals, not (sic) other cities." However, a second show was added at the same venue on June 6 in an announcement made on the band's official social media accounts. Jon Graber, recording engineer and mixer for Goldfinger, MxPx, and We Are the Union, has served as a guest guitarist for all of the band's reunion shows. DHC hosted a concert with Hepcat on September 13 at the House of Blues in Anaheim, CA. They were announced in April 2025 as one of the performing bands at Riot Fest in Chicago..

In a 2026 interview, Jason Hammon announced that several unreleased songs and demos were being considered for release. This would become a reality when on October 8, 2026, Elyse Rogers and Karina Deniké announced in a social media video that four unreleased songs produced from the Purr era (1999) would be released as part of a deluxe edition of the album, packaged as Purr Deluxe. This deluxe album will also include the three songs previously exclusive to only the Japanese version of the album.

== References in popular culture ==
Multiple Dance Hall Crashers songs have been featured in movies/films:

Song	Album	Movie	Reference
"Enough"	Lockjaw	Angus	
"Don't Wanna Behave"	Lockjaw	Bio-Dome	
"I Want It All"	Honey, I'm Homely!	Home Alone 3	
"She's Trying"	Blue Plate Special	The Show	
"Lady Luck"	Blue Plate Special	Meet the Deedles	

== Members ==
=== Current ===
- Elyse Rogers – vocals, manager
- Karina Deniké – vocals
- Jason Hammon – guitar
- Mikey Weiss – bass
- Gavin Hammon – drums
- Jon Graber – touring guitarist

=== Former ===
- Mat Snyder – trombone
- Trombone Matt – trombone
- Tim Armstrong – vocals
- Andrew "Andrew Champion" Ataie – vocals
- J. Grant McIntire – guitar
- Alex Baker – bass
- Phil Ensor – guitar
- Billy Bouchard – guitar
- Matt Freeman – vocals, bass
- Scott Goodell – guitar
- Jeremy Goody – trumpet
- Damien Rasmussen – percussion
- Ingrid Jonsson – vocals
- Erik Larsen, aka Erik Kolacek – drums
- Jaime McCormick – guitar
- Leland McNeely
- Gavin DiStasi – trumpet
- Dave Camp† – guitar
- Joey Schaaf – keyboard
- Joel Wing – bass
- Harvey Hawks – trumpet
- Kincaid Smith – trumpet
- Jason Bermak – saxophone
- Efren Santana – saxophone
- Joshi Marshall – saxophone
- Matt Morrish – saxophone
- Dean Olmstead – saxophone
- John Pantle - horns
- Mason St. Peters - horns
- Mike Park - horns
- T-Bone Willy - horns

== Discography ==
=== Studio albums ===
- Dance Hall Crashers (1990), Moon Records
- Lockjaw (1995), MCA Records
- Honey, I'm Homely! (1997), MCA
- Purr (1999), Pink and Black

=== EPs ===
- Blue Plate Special EP (1998), MCA

=== Live albums ===
- The Live Record: Witless Banter & 25 Mildly Antagonistic Songs About Love (2000), Pink and Black
- Live at the House of Blues (2005), (The Show Must Go Off! live DVD)

=== Compilations ===
- 1989–1992 (1993), Moon Records (includes most of contents of first two releases, and some single/compilation material)
- The Old Record (1996), Honest Don's Records (reprint of 1989–1992 with the song "Time To Ease Up" excluded)
- Lockjaw (2024), (Self-Release) (two-disc re-release of Lockjaw plus three unreleased songs and "Truly Comfortable" packaged as part of Blue Plate Special). This compilation is occasionally referred to as the Hyde Street Demos.
- Purr Deluxe (2026), Fat Wreck Chords (reprint of Purr including all songs of the original album plus the three songs exclusive to the Japanese release and four unreleased songs.) Releases on November 6, 2026.

=== Demos ===
- Say Cheese (1989), Self-Released Demo (Cassette Only)
