= Guitarded =

Studio album by Limp
- Released: February 23, 1999
- Recorded: Motor Studios, San Francisco, CA; Prairie Sun, Cotati, CA
- Genres: Punk rock, pop punk, skate punk, ska
- Length: 30:10
- Label: Honest Don's
- Producer: Ryan Greene

Limp chronology
Fine Girl EP (1998)	Guitarded (1999)	Limp (2002)

Professional ratings
Review scores
Source	Rating

Guitarded is the second album by the San Francisco Bay Area pop punk band, Limp, released on February 23, 1999. The album was critically described as "by-the-numbers pop-punk" by Andy Hinds. Despite the lack of critical acclaim, the album gained popularity through heavy rotation on college radio, giving it more airplay than any other Honest Don's Records album. As with the band's other albums, it was produced by Ryan Greene. Mark deSalvo designed the album cover. Leslie West used this album's title and cover art for his 2004 album of the same name.

== Track listing ==
1. "Entertainer" – 2:31
2. "Bike Ride" – 1:45
3. "Passed Out" – 2:26
4. "Lost and Found" – 3:29
5. "Fine Girl" – 1:04
6. "Decision" – 2:17
7. "Bag Lunch" – 2:32
8. "Tomorrow" – 4:11
9. "Ten Minutes" – 2:29
10. "The Critic" – 1:58
11. "Better Reason" – 2:52
12. "DI" – 2:36

== Personnel ==
Johnny Cruz-Drums

Phil Ensor- Vocals/Guitar

Douglas Sangalang- Lead Guitar/Vocals

Serge Verkhovsky- Bass
