= Honest Don's Records =

- Founder: Fat Mike
- Genre: Punk rock
- Country of origin: U.S.
- Location: San Francisco, California

Honest Don's Records was a subsidiary label based in San Francisco, California, set up along with Pink & Black Records by Fat Wreck Chords to release material by bands that didn't fit within the roster at Fat.

The label ceased trading around 2003 with the Nerf Herder EP "My E.P.". Some of the bands were absorbed into the Fat roster, whilst others moved on.

== Catalog ==
They released a number of albums, each of which would have a unique variant on the record labels name:

Catalog #	Band	Title	Honest Don's...	Format
DON001	Diesel Boy	Cock Rock	Hardly Used Recordings	LP/CD/CS
DON002	Dance Hall Crashers	The Old Record	Hardly Used Recordings	LP/CD/CS
DON003	J Church	The Drama of Alienation	Hardly Used Recordings	LP/CD/CS
DON004	Millions Dead Cops Featuring Pig Champion	I Don't Want To Hurt You Dude, I Just Want My Shit Back		7"
DON005	The Other	The Other	Snug Fitting Trousers	CD
DON006	Submissives	An Anvil Will Wear Out Many A Hammer	Badly Bruised Bottoms	LP/CD
DON007	Mad Caddies	Quality Soft Core	Hardly Rude Recordings	LP/CD
DON008	Limp	Pop and Disorderly	Fat Free Recordings	LP/CD
DON009	The Riverdales	Blood on the Ice	Hardly Used Puckbags	7"
DON010	The Riverdales	Storm the Streets	Totally Beaten Brats	LP/CD/CS
DON011	Various Artists	Honest Don's Welcome Wagon	14 Step Program	CD
DON012	Chixdiggit!	Chupacabras	Exhilarated Industry Experts	7"
DON013	Teen Idols	Teen Idols	Reliable Redneck Recordings	LP/CD
DON014	Diesel Boy	Venus Envy	Fine Looking Fellows	LP/CD
DON015	Hagfish	Hagfish	Lame Ass Recordings	LP/CD
DON016	Chixdiggit!	Born on the First of July	Canadian Passport Recordings	LP/CD
DON017	Fluf	Road Rage	Brown Trout Surprise	LP/CD
DON018	Various Artists	Greatest Shits	Crazy Crappin' Clowns	CD
DON019	Limp	Guitarded	Ass, Gas or Grass...	LP/CD
DON020	Me First & The Gimme Gimmes	Elton	Wammie Winning Jerks	7"
DON021	Dogpiss	Eine Kleine Punkmusik	Had My Wife	LP/CD
DON022	Teen Idols	Pucker Up	Juvenile Jailbird Recordings	LP/CD
DON023	Various Artists	Return Of The Read Menace	Really Revolutionary Recordings	CD
DON024	The Muffs	Alert Today, Alive Tomorrow	M-M-Good Recordings	LP/CD
DON025	Diesel Boy	Sofa King Cool	Short Haired Dogs	LP/CD
DON026	Teen Idols and Spread	It Found A Voice	Foreign Trade Agreement	CD
DON027	Nerf Herder	How to Meet Girls	Corn Dog Emporium	CD
DON028	Chixdiggit!	From Scene to Shining Scene	Deep Deep Pockets	LP/CD
DON029	J Church	One Mississippi	Strictly Analog Recordings	LP/CD
DON030	Teen Idols	Full Leather Jacket	Whitetrash Ass Whoopin'	LP/CD
DON031	Bad Astronaut	Acrophobe	Sci-Fidelity Recordings	CD
DON032	Big In Japan	Destroy The New Rock	Tough Guy Factory	LP/CD
DON034	Diesel Boy	Rode Hard and Put Away Wet	Teen Pop Divas	LP/CD
DON035	Inspection 12	In Recovery	Barely Legal Recordings	LP/CD
DON036	Citizen Fish	Life Size	Old English Recordings	LP/CD
DON037	The Real McKenzies	Loch'd and Loaded	Kilt Wearin' Punks'	CD
DON038	Limp	Limp	Done Dirt Cheap	LP/CD
DON039	Various Artists	Dirty Dishes	Steamin' Hot Licks	CD
DON040	Nerf Herder	American Cheese	Fried Cheese On-A-Stick	CD
DON041	Bad Astronaut	Houston: We Have a Drinking Problem	12 Small Steps	CD
DON042	Squirtgun	Fade To Bright	Wacky Water Pistols	LP/CD
DON044	The Real McKenzies	Oot & Aboot	Sheep Shaggin' Recordings	LP/CD
DON045	Nerf Herder	My E.P.	Wasted Gnome Rock	CD

== Bands ==
- Bad Astronaut
- Big In Japan
- Chixdiggit
- Citizen Fish
- Dance Hall Crashers
- Diesel Boy
- Dogpiss
- Fluf
- Hagfish
- Inspection 12
- J Church
- Limp
- Mad Caddies
- MDC
- The Muffs
- Nerf Herder
- The Other
- The Real McKenzies
- The Riverdales
- Squirtgun
- Submissives
- Teen Idols

== See also ==
- List of record labels
