= Diesel Boy =

American punk rock band

- Origin: Santa Rosa, California, U.S.
- Genres: Punk rock, skate punk, pop punk
- Years active: 1993–2002, 2022–present
- Labels: Honest Don's; SBÄM Records
- Members: Diesel Dave; Greg Hensley; Paul Davis; Jack Miller
- Past members: Mike Schaus; Justin Werth; Geoff Arcuri (Lackey); Chad Philipps; Christopher Thomas
- Website: http://www.dieselboy.net

Diesel Boy is an American punk rock band from Santa Rosa, California, United States. They were formed in 1993 and were active until 2002. In 2022, they announced they would release a new album for SBÄM Records, which was released in 2023. They have a 7" on Fat Wreck Chords, four full-length albums released on Honest Don's Records, one full-length on SBAM and a split EP with the band Divit that was released on Coldfront Records.

== History ==
The band was formed in summer 1993, and soon after the world was introduced to their clever use of puns with their 7" release on Fat Wreck Chords, aptly titled Strap on Seven Inch, with four tracks, the first of which was "Titty Twister". Shortly afterward, in September 1996, Cock Rock would be released as their debut full length, released on Honest Don's Records, a subsidiary of Fat Wreck Chords, for which Diesel Boy was the flagship band. Ryan Greene produced all four of the band's Honest Don's releases. Matt Bayles produced "Gets Old."

The band toured extensively from 1995 to 2002. It is estimated that they played in 40 of the 50 U.S. states, every province in Canada (where it is arguable that the band enjoyed its biggest following), Europe several times, and Australia. During this time they played with the likes of No Use for a Name, NOFX, Good Riddance, The Vandals, Strung Out, SNFU, Gob, The Ataris, Satanic Surfers, and The Sugar Hill Gang.

Strung Out took them on their first U.S./Canada tour which followed the buzz created by appearance of the band's instant classic "Titty Twister", on the Fat Wreck Chords compilation Survival of the Fattest. Their second album, Venus Envy (1998), marked the departure of drummer and original member, Mike Schaus. He was replaced by Geoff Arcuri in late 1998, making his first appearance with the band on their third album, 1999's Sofa King Cool.

Diesel Boy appears, as a band, while performing their own material from the Cock Rock album, on an episode of Freaks and Geeks called "Noshing and Moshing" that aired in 2000.

Following their 2001 album Rode Hard and Put Away Wet, the band unofficially split up. Vocalist Diesel Dave said in a 2011 interview that "things just kind of wound down".

In 2011, the band got back together and announced on their Facebook page that they were working on a new album. Several songs were composed, but due to the geographic difficulties (Diesel Dave was based in Seattle whereas the other members were in California), as well as family reasons, the band was not able to complete the album.

In March 2013, the band's vocalist Diesel Dave played solo acoustic on the Hits and Pits tour in Australia. He also stayed connected to writing by freelancing for several publications including Seattle Weekly and AMP Magazine.

In 2016, Diesel Dave launched a new band called Dirty Outs along with an EP containing six songs.

In 2022, with members split between Seattle and the Bay Area, the band began work on their fifth full-length album. Entitled Gets Old, the record was engineered and produced by Matt Bayles and was released on July 28, 2023, on SBÄM Records.The album features the track "Bismarck", with a guest appearance by Kim Warnick of the Seattle punk band Fastbacks.

== Current members ==
- Dave "Diesel Dave" Lake – vocals and guitar (1993–present)
- Greg Hensley – bass guitar (1993–present)
- Jack Miller – lead guitar (2023–present)
- Paul Davis – drummer (2025–present)

== Former members ==
- Christopher Thomas – drummer (2021-2025)
- Chad Philipps – guitar (2022-2023)
- Justin Werth – guitar and vocal harmonies (1993-2021). He has also played guitar in Fang.
- Geoff Arcuri – drummer (1999–2021)
- Mike Schaus – drummer (1993–1999)

== Discography ==
=== Studio albums ===
- Cock Rock (1996)
- Venus Envy (1998)
- Sofa King Cool (1999)
- Rode Hard and Put Away Wet (2001)
- Gets Old (2023)

=== EPs ===
- Strap on Seven Inch (1996)
- Double Letter Score (with Divit) (2001)
- Tapes / Punk Rock Minivan (2023)

=== Music videos ===
- "She's My Queen" (1999)

== Appearances in popular culture ==
- Their song from the Venus Envy album, "Endless Summer Days", appears in the full-length feature film Drive Me Crazy.
- Three of their songs of the Sofa King Cool album, "A Literary Love Song", "She's My Queen" and "Shining Star", were featured as soundtracks in the 1999 video game, Test Drive Off-Road 3.
- The song "She's My Queen" from the Sofa King Cool album was mentioned in the Paul Simon biography A Life, as a song that references Joe DiMaggio (although it is incorrectly referred to as "She's My Marilyn Monroe").
- The song "True Drew" is mentioned in the book Rock and Roll Baby Names as a rock song related to the name Drew.
