= Inspection 12 =

American pop-punk band

- Origin: Jacksonville, Florida, U.S.
- Genres: Pop-punk; punk rock; alternative rock
- Years active: 1994–present
- Labels: DIY; Honest Don's; Takeover; People of Punk Rock Records
- Members: Rob Reid; Pete Mosely; James Trimble; Tim Grisnik; Jeremy Baker
- Past members: Scott Shad; John Comee; Dan McLintock

Inspection 12 is an American pop-punk band from Jacksonville, Florida. They have released two full-length recordings internationally, one on Honest Don's Records and one on Suburban Home Records and Takeover Records. They have also released four full-length albums independently.

== History ==
=== Early career ===
Vocalist/guitarist Rob Reid, guitarist Dan McLintock, bassist John Comee and drummer Scott Shad formed The Abominable Snowmen of the Himalayas 12 in 1994 while in junior high school, influenced by the first wave of southern Californian punk rock/skate punk bands such as Lagwagon and NOFX. The band was renamed Inspection 12, inspired by a fictional band on the Nickelodeon TV show The Adventures of Pete & Pete named Inspector 12. After recording a cassette in 1995, titled Eponymous EP, the band recruited a second guitarist, Peter Mosely. Their first show for a crowd was at a friend's backyard birthday party, playing only cover songs by bands such as Nirvana and Green Day, with Mosely joining in on NOFX and Weezer songs.

Their first full-length album, Come, Hefe, Come! was recorded on cassette tape in 1996 and sold independently. Few copies are known to exist, but a digital copy made by a fan was uploaded to the official message board in 2003. Recorded live and consisting mostly of songs later re-recorded with vastly improved production values, such as "Secure" and "Bad Mentality", it could be considered a demo. Their first big show was opening for Less Than Jake.

Incorporating vocal harmonies beyond that which is considered gratuitous for most typical skate punk bands, while also sharing vocal duties on their recording, their second album Inspection 12 would be the last for Reid as he graduated and left the band to enter college, and with Comee also leaving, McLintock soon took up the bass and lead vocalist roles. Released in 1997 on compact disc, it was their first recording with sound quality on the level of a professional demo. Another album, You're A Nation, was released in 1998. James Trimble, Shad's cousin, was added as second guitarist to replace Reid. Their fourth full-length album, Step Into The Fire, was released in 1999 with the new lineup. On this recording, Shad's best friend Ryan Key performed additional vocals on the song "Nothing to Lose". While still in high school, they sold more than 2,500 copies of their independently recorded and produced CDs locally and opened for bands such as Strung Out, Millencolin, and Bigwig. Although being a relatively successful local band, Mosely recalled feeling like outcasts because of their preppy clothes and unorthodox style of punk rock: "Whenever we'd play a show like Good Riddance or AFI, it would always be a real tough crowd. I used to hear it all the time about us being rich kids."

On March 6, 2001, awaiting the release of Inspection 12's debut album, Shad was killed in a car accident at the age of 18. His death devastated the members of the band, who for a while considered disbanding. Key, now playing with Yellowcard, was deeply traumatized by this experience. Both Inspection 12 and Yellowcard would keep writing songs and paying tribute to Shad's memory throughout their careers. Instead of auditioning for a new drummer, McLintock's best friend since pre-school, Tim Grisnik, was signed on as the new drummer, and in May, In Recovery was released on Honest Don's, in memory of Shad.

Trimble left the band after their 2002 In Recovery U.S. tour and returned to college, and the band returned to the studio as a three-piece to record their second album for Honest Don's, Get Rad. However, after eight months of recording songs, which were distinctly less typical for punk rock than their previous recordings, more slowly paced and prominently featuring many other instruments than the core bass, guitar and drums, Honest Don's president reportedly told them, "My label doesn't put out this kind of music. And I don't even know what to call it." They were dropped from the record label and bought their recorded material back to finish the album themselves. Mosely was simultaneously assisting Yellowcard with writing and recording bass and piano/keyboards for their Capitol Records debut, Ocean Avenue, and left Inspection 12 shortly after to join them as their permanent bassist. After closing a new recording deal with European label Floppy Cow Records, the album was finished, with guest vocals by Key as well as Ted Bond, lead singer of Craig's Brother. It was released by Floppy Cow in 2004 in Europe and Japan, along a distribution deal with Suburban Home Records to sell it in the U.S. The distribution rights for the album were later transferred to Yellowcard guitarist Ben Harper's label Takeover Records when the band was signed to the label in 2005.

=== Recent history ===
After the release of Get Rad, McLintock also decided to return to school. Not breaking up or going on hiatus, Inspection 12 remained, although only playing sporadic shows in the member's home area of Jacksonville as they focused on their lives outside of music. Trimble rejoined the band in July 2006 after finishing his studies. After Yellowcard's 2007 release, Paper Walls, Mosely would also return, describing the current situation of the band, "We just toned it down, and it's more of just a hobby for us.” In November 2012, McLintock announced on the band's official Facebook page he had decided to leave the band. Reid, the band's original lead vocalist and co-founder, rejoined soon thereafter.

Inspection 12 announced via their Facebook page in May 2013 they were in the process of recording a new record, Redefine. The single "Ole You" was released on Amplified Vol. 1, a compilation CD of local Jacksonville artists. The band went on to release Redefine in December 2014. Jeremy Baker joined in 2014, replacing McLintock on bass. After several years of occasional live performances primarily around the Jacksonville area, Inspection 12 announced via social media a new album, Are We There Yet?!..., would be released on People of Punk Rock Records in July 2025.

== Band members ==
Current members

- Rob Reid – lead vocals, guitar (1994–1997, 2013–present)
- Pete Mosely – guitar, piano, backing vocals, occasional lead vocals (1995–2003, 2007–present), bass (2012–2014)
- James Trimble – guitar, backing vocals (1998–2002, 2006–present)
- Jeremy Baker – bass (2014–present)
- Tim Grisnik – drums, percussion (2001–present)

Former members

- John Comee – bass (1994–1997)
- Dan McLintock – lead vocals, bass (1997–2012), guitar (1994–1997, 2000 in studio, 2003–2006), backing vocals (1994–1997)
- Scott Shad – drums, percussion (1994–2001; died 2001)

Session members

- Ryan Key – bass (2000)

Timeline

== Discography ==
=== Albums ===
- Come, Hefe, Come! (1996)
- Inspection 12 (1997)
- You're A Nation (1998)
- Step Into the Fire (1999)
- In Recovery (2001)
- Get Rad (2003)
- Redefine (2014)
- Are We There Yet?!... (2025)

=== EPs ===
- Home (2000)

=== Demos ===
- Eponymous EP (1995)

=== Compilation appearances ===
- Floyd ...And Out Come The Teeth, Fat Wreck Chords, contributed "Red Letter Day" (2001)
- The Beginning of the End, End Records, contributed "Secret Identity" (2001)
- Honest Don's Dirty Dishes, Honest Don's Records, contributed "Secret Identity" (2001)
- A Different Shade of Green: A Green Day Tribute, Skunk-Ape Records, contributed "F.O.D." (2003)

== Videography ==
- Inspection 12 DVD (2004)
