= Limp (band) =

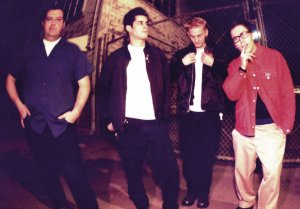

Background information
- Origin: San Francisco Bay Area, California, United States
- Genres: Pop-punk; punk rock; alternative rock; ska punk
- Years active: 1994^{[1]}–2002
- Labels: Honest Don's; Fueled by Ramen; Coldfront
- Past members: Phil Ensor; Serge Verkhovsky; Johnny Cruz; Billy Bouchard; Dan McLintock; Doug Sangalang; Scott Goodell

Limp was an American pop-punk band formed in 1994, with strong influences in both rock and ska, hailing from the San Francisco Bay Area. Limp released three studio albums on Honest Don's, a subsidiary label of Fat Wreck Chords, as well as an EP released on Fueled by Ramen, before their 2002 breakup.

== History ==
Limp formed in 1994 with founding members Phil Ensor (vocals, guitar) and Serge Verkhovsky (bass), and would later borrow Dance Hall Crashers member Scott Goodell to be the band's first drummer. They recorded a demo that was given to Marty Gregori of Bracket, which was later passed along to Michael Burkett at Fat Wreck Chords.^{[1]} The demo caught the labels interest and initially, a 7" record was planned for release. After recording "Clear Color" and "Bug Dance", a full-length album was instead offered on the labels recently launched subsidiary, Honest Don's.^{[1]} The outcome would be Limp's debut Pop & Disorderly released in 1997. The album was recorded as a four-piece featuring Ensor, Verkhovsky, second guitarist Billy Bouchard and new drummer Johnny Cruz. Overall, the album showcased a strong pop punk influence, with major focus on vocal harmonies, two traits the band would continue to exercise throughout their career. Although Ensor provided lead vocals for almost the entire album, Bouchard would supply them on "Eighteen", as well as "Holiday Road", a cover of the Lindsey Buckingham song from the 1983 film National Lampoon's Vacation.

Following two tours with Less Than Jake, drummer Vinnie Fiorello presented Limp with the opportunity to issue a release on his label, Fueled by Ramen. This would result in the Fine Girl EP released in 1998, which gathered leftover songs from Pop & Disorderly and included new songs that would see later release on the band's second album.^{[1]} This would also mark the debut of guitarist Doug Sangalang, formerly of Screw 32, who had recently replaced Bouchard, although due to the songs chosen, both guitarists would make an appearance on the EP. That same year, Limp released a four-song 7" of older material on Coldfront Records, that Ensor and Verkhovsky recorded with original drummer Hammon, as a three-piece in August 1996 at Westbeach Recorders with producer Greg Hetson.

In February 1999, Limp released Guitarded, their second album for Honest Don's, recorded the previous year over the course of seven months, between a slew of tours. The album, which featured a slightly more mature sound, was a modest success on college radio and earned more airplay than any previous Honest Don's release.^{[2]} Perhaps done sarcastically, Limp thanked Limp Bizkit in the liner notes, a band they were increasingly becoming more confused with, however the two bands did play together in 1997, before either attained much notoriety.^{[1]} Around the time Guitarded was released, Limp were being courted by MCA Records following the suggestion of Blink-182, an acquaintance of the band who were also on the label at the time.^{[1]} Shortly after, interest dissolved following major label consolidation and many existing labels cutting their rosters.^{[1]} Citing fatigue from constant touring, the band decided to take some time off.

Limp returned in 2002, with their third and most ambitious album for Honest Don's, the self-titled Limp. Like the band's previous releases, the album was produced by Ryan Greene at Motor Studios in San Francisco, California. Limp demonstrated a more straightforward rock sound, as compared to the pop punk approach of previous albums. Sangalang departed prior to the album's recording, marking the return of Bouchard, who had not appeared on a Limp album since the band's 1997 debut, Pop & Disorderly. Bouchard's return was not intended to be permanent however, as made evident in the liner notes, which listed him separately from the other band members. The album also featured an appearance from Karina Deniké of Dance Hall Crashers on "Get Away". Limp would be the band's final album before breaking up later that year.

== Band members ==
- Phil Ensor – vocals, guitar
- Serge Verkhovsky – bass
- Johnny Cruz – drums

Former members

- Billy Bouchard – guitar, vocals
- Dan McLintock – guitar, backing vocals
- Doug Sangalang – Lead guitar, backing vocals
- Gavin Hammon – drums

== Discography ==
Albums

Date of release	Title	Label	Format
June 24, 1997	Pop & Disorderly	Honest Don's	CD/LP
February 23, 1999	Guitarded	Honest Don's	CD/LP
February 19, 2002	Limp	Honest Don's	CD/LP

EPs

- Fine Girl (1998) Fueled by Ramen
- Limp (1998) Coldfront Records

Compilation appearances

- Honest Don's Welcome Wagon (1997) Honest Don's
- Expose Yourself (1997) Go-Kart Records/Black Rat Recordings
- The Year of the Rat (1998) Fueled by Ramen
- Honest Don's Greatest Shits (1998) Honest Don's
- Short Music for Short People (1999) Fat Wreck Chords
- Music to Listen to Music By (1999) Coldfront Records
