= Sensei robotic catheter system =

The Sensei X robotic catheter is a medical robot designed to enhance a physician’s ability to perform complex operations using a small flexible tube called a catheter. As open surgical procedures that require large incisions have given way to minimally invasive surgeries in which the surgeon gains access to the target organs through small incisions using specialized surgical tools. One important tool used in many of these procedures is a catheter used to deliver many of things a surgeon needs to do his work, to impact target tissue and deliver a variety of medicines or disinfecting agents to treat disease or infection.

Manufactured by Hansen Medical, Sensei X is a specialized robotic catheter system that is controlled by a physician and is designed for accurate positioning, manipulation and stable control of catheter and catheter-based technologies during cardiovascular procedures. The Sensei system obtained U.S. Food and Drug Administration (FDA) clearance in 2007, after which the Cleveland Clinic's electrophysiology program, then directed by Dr. Andrea Natale, received the first placement. The Sensei Robotic Catheter System and Artisan Extend Control Catheter allow physicians to navigate flexible catheters with greater stability and control during complex cardiac arrhythmia procedures. Hansen Medical has related co-development agreements with the following industry leaders: St. Jude Medical, GE Healthcare, Siemens Healthcare, and Philips Medical Systems.

Hansen Medical was founded by Dr. Frederic Moll, who had also co-founded Intuitive Surgical, manufacturer of the Da Vinci Surgical System, whose use has propelled medicinal robotics to the forefront of patient care. The Sensei system is indicated for use during the cardiac mapping phase of cardiac arrhythmia treatment in the US. Meanwhile, it has CE mark approval for facilitating the navigation of ablation catheters within the atria of the heart during complex arrhythmia procedures such as Atrial Fibrillation (AF).

In November 2010, Hansen Medical received unconditional Investigational Device Exemption (IDE) approval from the FDA initiating a clinical trial to investigate the use of the Sensei X Robotic Catheter System and the Artisan Control Catheter for treatment of AF, the most common cardiac arrhythmia. The Principal Investigator of the ARTISAN AF Trial is Dr. Andrea Natale, executive medical director for Texas Cardiac Arrhythmia Institute (TCAI). The first case in the trial was completed by Dr. Joseph Gallinghouse, an electrophysiologist, at the TCAI at St. David's Medical Center.

By the end of 2010, nearly 100 Sensei systems have been shipped worldwide since its 2007 release. The system has been used to perform almost 5,000 procedures. The Sensei system operates by guiding standard catheters through a manipulated robotically steerable sheath (hollow tube) in the patient's vasculature. The doctor performs the procedure at a control station with a technology called "IntelliSense" to proximally measure the forces applied along the shaft of the catheter as a result of catheter tissue contact. The Artisan catheter has two robotically controlled segments which provides six degrees of freedom and 270 degrees of bend articulation which can assist physicians in accessing hard-to-reach cardiac anatomy. The open lumen Artisan catheter accommodates 8F percutaneous EP catheters. Centers have reported acute and long term success rates consistent with manual procedures.

== The Sensei Robotic System in clinical use ==
Although the Sensei system was initially tested in a range of ablation procedures including SVT and typical atrial flutter, there is most excitement about its role in complex ablation procedures such as for atrial fibrillation (AF), where the ability to manipulate catheters to precise locations within the heart and keep them stable in the desired position is crucial. Achieving adequate tissue contact, ideally with a small amount of pressure being applied by the catheter during ablation, is also essential to effectively destroy the heart tissue responsible for arrhythmia. The ability to titrate catheter contact force using the Sensei system’s built-in pressure sensor technology (called intellisense) may allow operators to maximise the chance of creating effective burns across the thickness of the atrial wall, whilst minimising the risk of complication. Intracardiac echocardiography has also demonstrated that greater catheter stability is achieved with robotic compared to manual catheter delivery. Consequently, there is evidence that robotic ablation causes more effective and more efficient burns.

Use of robotic navigation for catheter ablation was also designed to allow Electrophysiology to perform most of the procedure without being exposed to X-rays (or radiation). The radiation dose to the operator during a conventional manual ablation procedure is relatively small, although there is cumulative exposure that becomes an important consideration for operators performing procedures on a daily basis. By performing procedures a few metres away using a robotic system and seated in the leaded anteroom, the operator is shielded from X-rays and is less vulnerable to operator fatigue, which may affect operator performance in long complex cases. Use of robotic navigation has been shown to reduce fluoroscopy times in catheter ablation of AF, resulting in reduced X-ray exposure for patients and other health care professionals present in the catheter laboratory.

== Early Experience with the Sensei Robotic System ==
The system has been the subject of several clinical trials in the USA and Europe, particularly for the catheter ablation of AF. There were early safety concerns after the ‘first-in-human’ studies suggested high complication rates. Wazni et al. reported experience with the first 71 catheter ablations for AF in their centre using the Hansen robotic navigation system starting from 2005.

These early studies have allowed others to incorporate changes to their technique, and hence recent work has produced complication rates for catheter ablation of AF comparable to procedures performed manually. The field of robotic ablation is growing and evolving rapidly, and randomised controlled trials comparing robotic to manual ablation are ongoing in Europe and the USA to see if these potential advantages will translate into better clinical outcomes.

== Recent studies using the Sensei Robotic system ==
Since there are no completed randomised controlled trials comparing robotic ablation to manual ablation, comparing the modalities remains difficult. Techniques, complication rates and clinical results vary widely between centres for both manual and robotic procedures, making registry data difficult to compare. Typical ranges for procedures performed manually are: major complication rates of 3-5%, and success rates of approximately 80-90% for paroxysmal AF and 70-75% for persistent AF (depending on the length of follow-up). The following are recent reports in medical journals detailing experience of the Sensei system in the catheter ablation of AF, and demonstrate approximate success and complication rates at the time of writing:

Study	Parameter	Robotic ablation	Manual ablation
Prague; 2011	Number of subjects	100 total All paroxysmal	(No comparator group)
Prague; 2011	Pulmonary vein isolation achieved acutely	100%	
Prague; 2011	Procedure time	3.7 ± 0.9 hours	
Prague; 2011	Fluoroscopy time	11.9 ± 7.8 minutes	
Prague; 2011	Clinical success (Freedom from AF )	63% at 15 ± (3-28) month, 86% after 21 patients had a repeat procedure	
Prague; 2011	Safety	Total complications 0%	
Texas Group; 2009	Number of subjects	193 total 135 paroxysmal 55 persistent 6 long-lasting persistent	197 total (registry cohort) 127 paroxysmal 55 persistent 11 long-lasting persistent
Texas Group; 2009	Pulmonary vein isolation achieved acutely	100%	100%
Texas Group; 2009	Procedure time	3.1 ± 0.8 hours	3.1 ± 0.8 hours
Texas Group; 2009	Fluoroscopy time	48.9 ± 24.6 minutes	58.4 ± 20.4 minutes
Texas Group; 2009	Clinical success (Freedom from AF )	Overall 85% at 14 ± 1 month Paroxysmal AF 90% Persistent AF 71% Long-lasting 100% (of only 6)	Overall 81% at 14 ± 1 month Paroxysmal AF 85% Persistent AF 73% Long lasting 67%
Texas Group; 2009	Safety	Total complications 1.5% 1% tamponade	Total complications 1.0% 0.5% tamponade
Hamburg; 2010	Number of subjects	64 total (all paroxysmal)	(No comparator group)
Hamburg; 2010	Pulmonary vein isolation achieved acutely	100%	
Hamburg; 2010	Procedure time	3.0 (2.5- 3.8) 1.5 hours	
Hamburg; 2010	Fluoroscopy time	24 (12-34) minutes	
Hamburg; 2010	Clinical success (Freedom from AF)	81% at 12 months	
Hamburg; 2010	Safety	Total complications 0%	
Hamburg; 2009	Number of subjects	65 total Paroxysmal 43 Persistent 22	
Hamburg; 2009	Pulmonary vein isolation achieved acutely	95% (remainder completed manually)	
Hamburg; 2009	Procedure time	3.3 ± 0.7 hours	
Hamburg; 2009	Fluoroscopy time	17 ± 7 minutes	
Hamburg; 2009	Clinical success (Freedom from AF )	73% at 8 months 76% Paroxysmal 78% persistent	
Hamburg; 2009	Safety	Total complications 5% Tamponade 1.5%	
Prague; 2009	Number of subjects	22 total All paroxysmal	16 total (registry cohort) All paroxysmal
Prague; 2009	Pulmonary vein isolation achieved acutely	100%	100%
Prague; 2009	Procedure time	3.5 ± 0.5 hours	4.2 ± 1.0 hours
Prague; 2009	Fluoroscopy time	15 ± 5 minutes	27 ± 9 minutes
Prague; 2009	Clinical success (Freedom from AF )	91% at 5 ± 1 month	81% at 9 ± 3 month
Prague; 2009	Safety	Total complications 0%	Total complications 0%
Multicenter group (France, Germany, Italy, Prague, USA); 2008	Number of subjects	40 total Paroxysmal 29 Persistent 11	(No comparator group)
Multicenter group (France, Germany, Italy, Prague, USA); 2008	Pulmonary vein isolation achieved acutely	100%	
Multicenter group (France, Germany, Italy, Prague, USA); 2008	Procedure time	2.8 ± 1.5 hours	
Multicenter group (France, Germany, Italy, Prague, USA); 2008	Fluoroscopy time	64 ± 33 minutes	
Multicenter group (France, Germany, Italy, Prague, USA); 2008	Clinical success (Freedom from AF )	98% at 12 months	
Multicenter group (France, Germany, Italy, Prague, USA); 2008	Safety	Total complications 5% Tamponade 5% (nil else)	
