= San Sai =

San Sai may refer to several places in Thailand:

- San Sai District
- San Sai, Fang
- San Sai, Phrao
- San Sai, Saraphi
- San Sai, Mae Chan
- San Sai, Mueang Chiang Rai
