= Lockjaw (album) =

Studio album by Dance Hall Crashers
- Released: August 29, 1995
- Recorded: 1995
- Studios: Fantasy Studios (Berkeley, California)
- Genres: Ska punk; pop punk
- Length: 40:52
- Label: (510) Records
- Producers: Dance Hall Crashers; Stoker; Rob Cavallo

Dance Hall Crashers chronology
Dance Hall Crashers (1990)	Lockjaw (1995)	Honey, I'm Homely! (1997)

Lockjaw is the second studio album by American rock band Dance Hall Crashers. Produced by the band, Stoker, and Rob Cavallo, the album was released on August 29, 1995, in the United States by (510) Records, an imprint of MCA Records.

== Background ==
"Go" was released as a cassette single in early 1994 exclusively to Hawaii. A 2024 limited re-release of the album, described by the band as a 29½th anniversary release, includes the unreleased songs "American Dream" and "Footsteps", along with "Punk Rock Boy" and "Truly Comfortable" from the 1998 EP Blue Plate Special. During live performances of "Enough", the line "just shut up and make it right" is replaced with "shut the fuck up and make it right". Two songs appear in films: "Enough" in the 1995 film Angus and "Don't Wanna Behave" in the 1996 film Bio-Dome.

== Critical reception ==
Professional ratings
Review scores
Source	Rating
AllMusic	4/5 stars
Oakland Tribune	1/4 stars
The San Francisco Examiner	3/4 stars
Southtown Star	5/5 stars
The Grand Rapids Press	3/4 stars

Pemberton Roach of AllMusic called Lockjaw a "wonderful reminder of the original spirit of ska-punk," elaborating that "Rather than celebrate the meathead/frat boy misogyny and overly simplistic anarchistic politics that have plagued a lot of 'third-wave' ska and punk-pop, Dance Hall Crashers choose to throw a big ol' party." Trouser Press considered the album "a marvelous surge of mature and catchy power pop accented with punk juice and set—almost incidentally—to a breathless bluebeat." Music critic Gina Arnold described the dual vocals of Elyse Rogers and Karine Deniké as "reminiscent of the '80s group Bananarama." She classified the album as 'utterly frothy,' while noting that several songs were "fun but lacking in depth." John Everson of the Southtown Star gave the album a perfect rating, claiming Lockjaw as "the funniest album I've heard so far this year." Everson later ranked Lockjaw as his top 1995 album. In contrast, an unspecified critic from the Oakland Tribune gave the album a 1 out of 4 rating, blaming its shortcomings on Green Day's former managers who signed the band to (510) Records. While the critic disparaged the vocals and song choices, notably "Queen for a Day" and "We Owe," they praised the guitar work of Jason Hammon and Scott Goodell on the latter track and "Sticky."

== Track listing ==
All tracks are written by Dance Hall Crashers (Elyse Rogers, Karina Deniké, Jason Hammon, Scott Goodell, Mikey Weiss and Gavin Hammon), except where noted.

Lockjaw track listing
No.	Title	Length
1.	"Shelley"	3:11
2.	"Don't Wanna Behave"	2:24
3.	"Queen for a Day"	2:49
4.	"Flyin"	3:13
5.	"Good for Nothin"	3:20
6.	"Buried Alive"	2:24
7.	"Sticky"	3:02
8.	"Too Late"	2:38
9.	"Go"	3:11
10.	"Enough"	2:59
11.	"Pictures" (Tim Armstrong)	2:29
12.	"Day Job"	2:35
13.	"So Sue Us"	3:18
14.	"We Owe"	2:19
Total length:		40:52

== Personnel ==
Adapted from liner notes.

Dance Hall Crashers

- Elyse Rogers – vocals, management, production
- Karina Deniké – vocals, production
- Jason Hammon – guitar, gang vocals, production
- Scott Goodell – guitar, gang vocals, production
- Mikey Weiss – bass guitar, gang vocals, production
- Gavin Hammon – drums, percussion, gang vocals, production

Additional musicians

- Davey Havok – gang vocals on "Don't Wanna Behave"

Production

- Stoker – production
- Rob Cavallo – production on "Enough"
- Jeff Saltzman – A&R
- Frank Rinella – recording engineer
- Jerry Finn – mixing engineer
- Neill King – recording engineer on "Enough"
- Brian Gardner – mastering engineer
- Bob Ludwig – mastering engineer on "Enough"

Artwork

- "SCANO" – art direction, illustration
- Dave Merkley – DHC logo

== Charts ==
Chart (1995)	Peak position
US Top Heatseekers (Billboard)	8

== See also ==
- 1995 in music
- Ska punk
