= J Church (band) =

American punk rock band

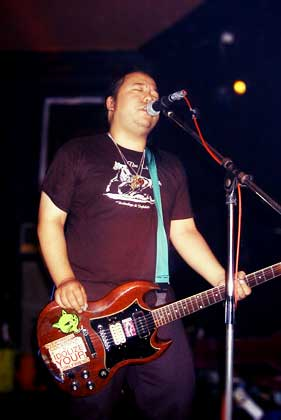
- Frontman Lance Hahn

Background information
- Origin: San Francisco, California, United States
- Genres: Punk rock, pop punk, emo pop
- Years active: 1992–2007
- Past members: Lance Hahn; Gardner Maxam; Aaron Olson; Adam Pfahler; Brendan Murdock; Wade Driver; Reed Burgoyne; Andee Connors; Scott Bradley; Jeff Bursley; Ben White; Chris Pfeffer; David DiDonato

J Church was an American punk rock band from San Francisco, California, formed by guitarist and vocalist Lance Hahn and bassist Gardner Maxam in 1992, after the demise of their former band Cringer. The group continued through numerous line-up changes and released a number of vinyl records and CDs before Hahn's death in 2007.

== History ==
Hahn and Maxam had played together in Cringer from the band's inception in 1985 to its demise in 1991. This group, whose additional members changed frequently in its short career, was initially based in Hahn and Maxam's native Hawaii before relocating to Los Angeles where Maxam was attending college.

After Cringer disbanded, the pair's new three-piece group, J Church, began. The band was named for the San Francisco Muni Metro J Church line that Hahn took down Church Street to band practice and to work every day. They went through a large number of drummers in their career; a noteworthy early player was the former Jawbreaker drummer Adam Pfahler. From its inception, J Church embarked upon writing and recording what became an extensive discography including numerous singles and splits with fellow punk rock bands including Discount and Less Than Jake. The group has released an estimated 150 records.

Maxam played in the band until 1998, when he became overwhelmed by the rigors of touring and decided to leave. In 2002, the band relocated to Austin, Texas, and the group's final line-up included bassist Ben White and drummer Chris Pfeffer of Severed Head of State, Storm the Tower and Signal Lost.

Hahn had become active as a "punk rock history writer", writing many pieces for Maximum Rock 'n' Roll, the long-running San Francisco punk zine, and working on a book compiling various writings on anarcho-punk groups. He also ran the independent record label Honey Bear Records.

Hahn had been suffering from kidney-related medical problems since 1999, and the problems worsened during the following decade. On July 7, 2007, a benefit entitled "Let's Do It For Lance!" was released to help defray the cost of his medical bills. He died on October 21, 2007, aged 40, after falling into a coma nine days earlier due to complications from kidney dialysis.

== Members ==
- Lance Hahn - vocals, guitar (1992–2007)
- Gardner Maxam - bass guitar, vocals (1992–1998)
- Aaron Olson - drums (1992)
- Adam Pfahler - drums (1992–1993, 1998–2002)
- Brendan Murdock - drums (1992–1994)
- Wade Driver - drums (1994–1995)
- Reed Burgoyne - drums (1995–1997)
- Andee Connors - drums (1997–2000)
- Scott Bradley - bass guitar (1998–1999)
- Jeff Bursley - bass guitar (1999–2002)
- Ben White - bass guitar (2002–2007)
- Chris Pfeffer - drums (2002–2007)
- David DiDonato - guitar (2002–2005)

Touring musicians

- Todd Kowalski - bass (1997; Japanese tour)
- Chris Hannah - bass (1997; Japanese tour)
- Jord Samolesky - drums (1997; Japanese tour)

Timeline

== Partial discography ==
The following partial discography of full-length albums is derived from the J Church fan web site.

=== Studio albums ===
- 1993: Quetzalcoatl
- 1994: Prophylaxis
- 1995: The Procession of Simulacra/Map Precedes Territory
- 1995: Arbor Vitae
- 1996: The Drama of Alienation
- 2000: One Mississippi
- 2004: Society is a Carnivorous Flower
- 2007: The Horror of Life

=== Singles collections ===
- 1993: Camels, Spilled Corona and the Sound of Mariachi Bands
- 1995: Nostalgic for Nothing
- 1998: Altamont '99
- 2001: Meaty, Beaty, Shitty Sounding

=== Split albums ===
- 2000: Split LP with Discount
- 2000: Split EP with Contra (traffic violation records)
- 2001: Split LP with Annalise
- 2003: Split LP/CD with Storm the Tower

=== Miscellaneous full-length releases ===
- 1995: Soul Patch and Cho Chos
- 1996: Whorehouse: Songs and Stories
- 1996/7: You Think You're Cool
- 1997: The Ecstasy of Communication
- 1998: Cat Food
- 1999: Slanted
- 2002: Palestine
- 2004: Seishun Zankoku Monogatari
