= 2012 (Chixdiggit EP) =

EP by Chixdiggit
- Released: September 16, 2016
- Genre: Pop punk
- Length: 24:23
- Label: Fat Wreck Chords
- Producer: KJ Jansen

Chixdiggit chronology
Safeways Here We Come (2011)	2012 (2016)

Professional ratings
Review scores
Source	Rating
Punknews.org	3.5/5 stars

2012 is the second EP by Canadian pop punk band Chixdiggit. It was released by Fat Wreck Chords on September 16, 2016. The album only consists of one track, which contains 19 songs, each one about a city the band had a show in during their 2012 tour. The single track challenges the NOFX claim to have recorded the longest punk song.

== Track listing ==
1. "2012" - 24:23

== Personnel ==
=== Band ===
- Tyler Pickering – drums
- Jimmy Gamble – rhythm guitar
- KJ Jansen – vocals, bass, rhythm guitar

=== Additional musicians ===
- Brendan Tincher, Keeje, Mike Eggermont – backing vocals
- Brent Cooper – guitar
- Kepi Ghoulie – vocals
