= Pink and Black Records =

American record label

- Founded: 1999
- Founder: Fat Mike
- Genre: Punk, Pop punk
- Country of origin: United States
- Official website: http://www.pinkandblack.com

Pink and Black Records is an imprint record label of Fat Wreck Chords created to distribute albums from female-fronted bands. The first record released on this label was the Dance Hall Crashers album Purr in 1999. Pink & Black is named for the two favorite colors of Erin Burkett, ex-wife of Fat Mike, and one of the founders of Fat Wreck Chords.

== Bands ==
- Dance Hall Crashers
- Fabulous Disaster
- The Flipsides

== See also ==
- List of record labels
