= Craig's Brother =

American punk rock band

- Origin: Santa Cruz, California, United States
- Genres: Punk rock, Pop punk, Melodic hardcore, Skate punk
- Years active: 1995–2001, 2003–present
- Labels: Tooth & Nail (1998-2000); Takeover Records (2004-2007); DIY (2007-present)
- Members: Ted Bond; Scott Hrapoff; Juice Cabrera; Steven Neufeld; Glade Wilson
- Past members: David Cree; Brent Kaping; Andy Snyder; Adam Nigh; Nick Handley; Dan McLintock; Ryan Key; Garret Baldwin; Heath Konkel; Tristan Pardee; Sam Prather; Dan Poole; Chuck Rocha; Jason Ragan
- Website: www.craigsbrother.com

Craig's Brother is an American punk rock band. They have released three albums internationally, two on Tooth & Nail Records and one self-released.

== History ==
=== Foundation and Homecoming (1995–2001) ===
In 1995, singer and guitar player for General Handywork Ted Bond got together with Andy Snyder, Scott Hrapoff, and Heath Konkel to pursue a sound that was inspired by Lagwagon and other bands on Fat Wreck Chords. The band name originated from people referring to Scott as "Craig's brother" because of Scott's brother Craig's popularity in high school.

After Adam Nigh joined the group in 1997, Craig's Brother signed a contract with the independent label Tooth & Nail Records, and in 1998 the band released their first album, Homecoming. The album was recorded at Westbeach Studios in Hollywood, and produced by Donnell Cameron.

After spending the summer of 1998 touring to promote Homecoming, Andy and Adam left Craig's Brother to form the band Too Bad Eugene. In December of that year, guitarist Ryan Key traveled from Florida to California to audition for the band. Ryan later memorialized his experiences auditioning for Craig's Brother in the song “Rock Star Land" by Yellowcard. Ryan was joined shortly thereafter by Dan McClintock from Inspection 12. At one point, the two of them represented Craig's Brother at the Cornerstone Festival as an acoustic duo. After touring vigorously the majority of 1999, the band found themselves without a van or money to buy one in August. When the band decided to go home and regroup, Ryan decided to go back to Jacksonville where he got a job with Sean Mackin and eventually joined Yellowcard. The band returned home and started to work on their second album, Lost at Sea. After recording finished in Vancouver, British Columbia, Canada in January, Dan McLintock also opted to return home to Jacksonville, rejoining his old band Inspection 12. In fall of that year, Heath also announced that he was quitting. The band continued to play shows, experimenting with a number of drummers and guitar players, including Garrett Baldwin, Justin (Juice) Cabrera and Steven Neufeld.

During this time the band experienced a sudden upsurge of fans with the advent of Napster when an unknown fan uploaded an mp3 of the song "Who Am I?" from the first album with the artist name "Craig's Brother (NOFX & Lagwagon)". The band openly gave their support to file sharing, arguing that sales would ultimately benefit from the free publicity, although reminding the fans that their label was against it.

Craig's Brother has had a tenuous relationship with the Christian music industry since its inception. Although the band originally accepted the label "Christian band" they quickly realized that it did not necessarily describe what they were attempting to do. Early on the band tried to make it clear that in spite of the Christian beliefs of some of the band members, the band was not necessarily a "Christian punk band", that in fact they were just punks who happened to be Christian. However, their early willingness to play Christian venues and sing about religious issues and their relationship with Tooth and Nail Records have made "Christian band" a label that Craig's Brother has never been able to completely get away from. Both of Craig's Brother's Tooth and Nail releases were initially banned from Family Book Stores and picked up later due to the demand from customers.

The band's perspectives on the Christian music industry and Napster led to a strained relationship with their label, and in the fall of 2000, Craig's Brother was released from their contract by Tooth & Nail Records. Tooth & Nail would press the album in February 2001, but did little to promote it, even neglecting to inform retailers of its existence. Record outlets would usually only stock the album at customers' requests, so sales were, not surprisingly, disappointing.

The band continued to play shows but could not keep a solid lineup. Finally in March 2002 Ted announced that he was quitting.

=== Reformation and The Insidious Lie (2003–present) ===
The three longest-lasting members, Ted Bond, Scott Hrapoff and Heath Konkel, reunited around Christmas 2003 and Craig's Brother was reformed, with Sam Prather as their new guitarist. The following year, E.P.idemic was released on Takeover Records, a label run by former Yellowcard guitarist Ben Harper, with former guitarist Steven Neufeld playing the second guitar. Following its release, Sam left the band. Struggling to find any suiting guitarists, as Steven was often busy working with his own band, HeyMike!, lead singer and songwriter Ted himself took up the role of rhythm guitarist. He was later joined by guitarist Glade Wilson in late 2006.

On March 23, 2009, the band began recording their third album at The Compound recording studio in Felton, CA with Kyle Black acting as producer, collaborating with their former guitarist Andy Snyder, and also again incorporating the services of former members Steven Neufeld and Adam Nigh. Without a record label, they financed this record themselves, and worked on it over the next year and a half at DK2 Studios in Santa Cruz, CA with Andy and Ted producing. On December 22, 2010, the band announced the completion of the album dubbed The Insidious Lie via their Twitter feed. It was made available for streaming its entirety on Christmas Day and then released on January 24, 2011, as a digital download, and later that spring on CD, and finally Veritas Vinyl pressed an LP in the summer of 2011. Craig's Brother followed the release The Insidious Lie with a few California shows and a European tour. In Fall 2013 Craig's Brother released a compilation of 10 of their earliest recordings entitled The Early Years.

Craig's Brother continued to tour "The insidious Lie" through 2014. Notably was their appearance on the main stage of Groezrock which NOFX headlined. Most recently Craig's Brother performed at Montebello Rockfest 2017. Craig's Brother began recording new music in October 2017 and in December 2017, Craig's Brother released "Meilynn's Song" for IndieVision Music's Friend & Family compilation.

In 2018, the band announced Devils In The Details, a new 5-song EP slated to be released by Indie Vision Music before the end of that year. They ended up releasing the EP in early 2019.

== Music style and influences ==
The band have cited Lagwagon as one of their main sources of inspiration. Others that have been listed as inspiration for the band include Bad Religion, The Beatles and NOFX.

== Discography ==
=== Albums ===
- Homecoming (1998)
- Lost at Sea (2001)
- The Insidious Lie (2011)
- The Early Years (2013)
- Easily Won, Rarely Deserved (2022)

=== EPs ===
- Keepin' It Real (1997)
- E.P.idemic (2004)
- Devils In The Details (2019)

=== Demos ===
- Self-titled Demo Tape (1996)

=== Compilation appearances ===
- Dominate '98, contributed "Homecoming" (1998)
- Songs From The Penalty Box, Tooth & Nail Vol. 2, contributed "Dear Charlotte" (1998)
- Songs From The Penalty Box, Tooth & Nail Vol. 3, contributed "Lonely Girl" (1999)
- Songs From The Penalty Box, Tooth & Nail Vol. 4, contributed "Head in a Cloud" (2000)
- Tooth & Nail 10th Anniversary Box Set, contributed "Dear Charlotte" (2003)

== Band members ==
- Ted Bond - Lead vocals, guitar
- Scott Hrapoff - Bass
- Juice Cabrera - Drums, backing vocals
- Steven Neufeld - Guitar, backing vocals
- Glade Wilson - Guitar, backing vocals
