= MC Lars discography =

American rapper discography

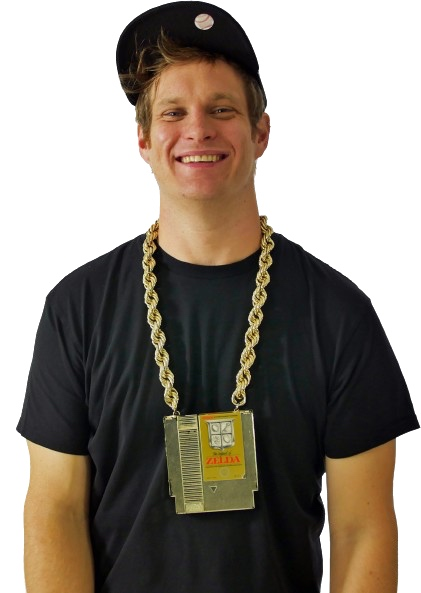
- MC Lars with his Legend of Zelda necklace.
- Studio albums: 6
- Extended plays: 8
- Compilation albums: 5
- Music videos: 27
- Collaborative releases: 4
- Compilations and mixtapes: 7
- Books: 2

The discography of MC Lars, an American musician and producer from Oakland, California, consists of five studio albums, seven compilation albums/mixtapes, six extended plays, two books, and twenty-seven music videos; as well as various appearances, collaborations and remixes.

== Studio albums ==
Year	Title	Peak chart positions		Label
Year	Title	US Heat	US R&B /HH	Label
2006	The Graduate	—	—	Horris / Nettwerk / Big Mouth Records / Shock Records
2009	This Gigantic Robot Kills	—	—	Horris / Oglio / Crappy Records / Shock Records
2011	Lars Attacks!	—	—	Horris Records
2015	The Zombie Dinosaur LP	15	36	Horris / Oglio
2021	Blockchain Planet	—	—	Horris Records
2026	The Edgar Allan Poe LP	—	—	Horris Records

== EPs ==
Year	Title	Label
2004	The Laptop EP	Truck Records / SideCho / Big Mouth / Horris Records / Shock Records
2008	The Green Christmas EP	Horris Records / Oglio / Crappy Records
2011	Frosty the Flow Man	Horris Records
2012	The Edgar Allan Poe EP	Horris Records
2018	Notes from Toontown	Horris Records

== Collaborative releases ==
Year	Title	Other Artist	Label
2008	The Digital Gangster LP	YTCracker	Horris Records
2009	Single and Famous	K.Flay	Horris Records
2019	The Dewey Decibel System	Mega Ran	Horris Records / Random Beats / Needlejuice Records
2020	The Friendalorians	Schäffer the Darklord	Horris Records
2024	999	Schäffer the Darklord	Horris Records

== Compilations and mixtapes ==
Year	Title	Label
2007 (download); 2010 (CD); 2011 (CD re-release)	21 Concepts (But a Hit Ain't One)	Horris Records / Oglio
2011	Indie Rocket Science	Horris Records
2012	Greatest Hits	Horris (download/vinyl) / Aaahh!!! Real (CD)
2015	22 Concepts (But a Hit Definitely Still Ain't One)	Horris Records
2016	Donald Trump Has Really Bad Morals	Horris Records / Oglio
2017	The Jeff Sessions	Horris Records
2020	The Bible Mixtape	Horris Records
2020	23 Concepts (But a Hit Apparently Both Obviously and Clearly Still Ain't One)	Horris Records

== Instrumental releases ==
Year	Title	Label
2015	The Zombie Dinosaur LP Instrumentals	Horris Records
2019	The Dewey Decibel System Instrumentals	Horris / Random Beats

== Demos ==
Year	Title	Label
1999	Nothing to Fear (as Lars Horris)	Noseman Records
2000	Insectivorous (as Lars Horris)	Noseman Records
2003	Radio Pet Fencing (as MC Lars Horris)	Truck Records

== Compilation appearances ==
Year	Track Featured	Album
2006	"Gary the Green Nosed Reindeer"	A Santa Cause - It's A Punk Rock Christmas 2
2007	"Gopher Guts"	The Simple Life: Camp Songs
2007	"The Lint Song (Extra Gory Demo)"	For the Kids Three!
2009	"(Lord it's Hard to Be Happy, When You Aren't Using) The Metric System"	Up End Atom
2012	"Summer Camp Love (Is So In Tents)"	Have a Crappy Summer
2014	"The Gospel of Hip-Hop (DJ RoboRob Remix)" (feat. KRS-One)	DEF CON 22: The Official Soundtrack
2019	"Tesla" (feat. MC Cone)	Watch The Cone

== DVDs ==
Year	Title	Label
2007	This DVD Is Not Punk Rock	Horris

== Books ==
Year	Title	Publisher
2006	27th Street: A Book of Cartoons	Horris
2007	Bukowski in Love: A Book of Poems	Horris

== Music videos ==
=== From The Laptop EP ===
- "iGeneration", directed by Stewart Hendler
- "Signing Emo", directed by Kurt St. Thomas

=== From The Graduate ===
- "Download This Song" (feat. Jaret Reddick), directed by Frank Borin
- "Ahab", directed by Sean Donnelly

=== From The Digital Gangster LP (with YTCracker) ===
- "Manifest Destiny", directed by Irina Slutsky
- "MC Lars's Facebook Friend Count > Your Facebook Friend Count", directed by Timothy Thompson

=== From This Gigantic Robot Kills ===
- "Hipster Girl", directed by Michael Licisyn
- "White Kids Aren't Hyphy", directed by Odin Wadleigh & Timothy Thompson
- "Guitar Hero Hero (Beating Guitar Hero Does Not Make You Slash)" (feat. Parry Gripp & Paul Gilbert), directed by Sean Donnelly
- "This Gigantic Robot Kills" (feat. the MC Bat Commander & Suburban Legends), directed by Timothy Thompson
- "True Player for Real" (feat. "Weird Al" Yankovic & Wheatus), directed by Richard Barham
- "Twenty-Three" (feat. Amie Miriello & James Bourne), directed by Heath Balderston

=== From Single and Famous (with K.Flay) ===
- "Single and Famous", directed by Timothy Thompson

=== From Lars Attacks! ===
- "Lars Attacks!", directed by Timothy Thompson

=== From The Edgar Allan Poe EP ===
- "Flow Like Poe", directed by Sean Donelly

=== From The Zombie Dinosaur LP ===
- "Dragon Blood" (feat. Monte Pittman), directed by Brosis
- "The Ballad of Hans Moleman", directed by Marianne Harris
- "Triforce", directed by Odlin Wadleigh
- "Never Afraid" (feat. Watsky), directed by Max Skaff
- "Sublime With Rome (Is Not the Same Thing as Sublime)" (feat. Roger Lima & Suburban Legends), directed by Watt White
- "If I Were a Jedi (That Would Be Hella Awesome)" (feat. Brian Mazzaferri), directed by Ben Garbe

=== From The Jeff Sessions ===
- "Don't Be a Cyberbully" (feat. Wheatus & Ash Wednesday), directed by Nicole Mago

=== From The Dewey Decibel System (with Mega Ran) ===
- "The Dewey Decibel System", directed by Richie Picasso
- "Walden", directed by DJ 2 Thirteen
- "1984" (feat. B. Dolan), directed by Kevin Parkinson
- "Julius Caesar" (feat. Dan Bull), directed by Nick J. Henderson

=== From Blockchain Planet ===
- "Finite Jest" (feat. Wheatus), directed by Max Skaff
