= Download This Song =

2006 single by MC Lars featuring Jaret Reddick

Single by MC Lars featuring Jaret Reddick

from the album The Graduate
- B-side: "Hot Topic Is Not Punk Rock"
- Released: March 21, 2006
- Genre: Nerdcore; political hip hop; conscious hip hop
- Length: 3:44
- Label: Nettwerk
- Songwriter: MC Lars
- Producers: MC Lars; Mike Sapone

MC Lars singles chronology
"Hot Topic Is Not Punk Rock" (2006)	"Download This Song" (2006)	"Ahab" (2006)

Jaret Reddick singles chronology
"Download This Song" (2006)

"Download This Song" is the second single from MC Lars' first studio album, The Graduate, and features Jaret Reddick of Bowling for Soup. The song uses sampling from Iggy Pop's "The Passenger".

In early 2006, this song was featured on the pop culture CBC Radio show Definitely Not the Opera during an exposé on geeks. It charted at number 29 on the Australia ARIA charts.

== Fight versus RIAA ==
MC Lars, and the Nettwerk Music Group, became involved in a lawsuit that the RIAA filed against David Greubel, a man from Texas, United States, who allegedly had committed copyright infringement through peer-to-peer filesharing over 600 music files, including "Sk8er Boi" by Avril Lavigne, another Nettwerk client. Greubel's 15-year-old daughter Elisa contacted MC Lars, citing the "Download This Song" lyric, "they sue little kids downloading hit songs", and saying that she could identify with the song due to her family's situation. In response, Nettwerk, which denounced the suit, announced that it would pay all of the family's legal fees, as well as any fines should the family lose. Furthermore, they arranged for representation for the family by Chicago lawyer Charles Lee Mudd Jr., who had previously defended other people subpoenaed by the RIAA.

== Music video ==
The music video was featured on TiVo in early 2007. Parts of the music video parody the common iTunes commercial with blacked-out figures dancing on a color background. It also shows numerous people listening to music on iPods and Sony PSPs, including a punk kid, skaters, and people at a gym.

== Track listing ==
1. "Download This Song"
2. "Hot Topic Is Not Punk Rock" (featuring The Matches)
3. "Rockstar"
4. "Download This Song" (music video)

== Charts ==
Chart (2006)	Peak position
Australia (ARIA)	29
