= Darkness Rising =

Darkness Rising may refer to:

== Film, television ==
- Darkness Rising (film), a 2017 horror film
- The Seeker (film), titled The Dark Is Rising in the United Kingdom, a 2007 film loosely based on the series
- An episode in the television series Hercules: The Legendary Journeys
- A five-part episode series of the animated series Transformers Prime

== Literature ==
- The Darkness Rising trilogy, second part of the Darkest Powers series, by Kelley Armstrong
- The Dark Is Rising Sequence, a fantasy series by Susan Cooper
- Darkness Rising, a 2020 crime thriller novel by British-Indian writer A A Dhand

== Other ==
- Dark Age of Camelot: Darkness Rising a 2005 expansion pack for the MMORPG Dark Age of Camelot.
- "Darkness Rising", a song by The Matches from their 2008 album A Band in Hope
