= Takeover Records 3-Way Issue No. 2 =

TakeOver Records 3-Way Issue #2

Compilation album by Near Miss, Reeve Oliver, The Matches
- Released: July 28 2005
- Genre: Punk rock
- Length: 28:51
- Label: Takeover Records
- Producer: Steve Kravac, Mikael Johnston

Takeover Records released its second issue of 3-Way on June 28, 2005. It was released with three bands: Takeover's own Near Miss, Reeve Oliver, and The Matches. Each band has three songs on the CD. The songs included on this EP by The Matches were co produced, engineered and mixed by Mikael Johnston, founder of Mephisto Odyssey and Dresden and Johnston.

== Track listing ==
1. Number 7 - Near Miss
2. At The Seam - Near Miss
3. Now Rectify - Near Miss
4. Summer - Reeve Oliver
5. I Play The Sensitive Songwriter Card - Reeve Oliver
6. We're All Gonna Die - Reeve Oliver
7. A Girl I Know - The Matches
8. Sick Little Suicide (acoustic) - The Matches
9. Shoot Me In The Smile (acoustic) - The Matches
