= Nothing to Fear (MC Lars album) =

Studio album demo by Lars Horris (MC Lars)
- Released: October 26, 1999
- Genre: Lo-fi; techno; comedy
- Length: 68:00
- Label: Lars Horris
- Producer: Lars Horris

Lars Horris (MC Lars) chronology
Nothing to Fear (1999)	Insectivorous (2000)

Professional ratings
Review scores
Source	Rating
SSMT	not rated

Nothing to Fear was the first home produced album that MC Lars, then known as Lars Horris, released under his first label in high school "Noseman Records". It was limited to 200 copies and was distributed amongst classmates at Robert Louis Stevenson School and his dorm, Junipero, at Stanford University.

== Track listing ==
1. Going for Your Ear
2. Peaceful Defenseless People
3. Pop Goes the Icon
4. Porcine Financial Issues
5. I Want to be Anakin Skywalker
6. Aliens in my Cereal
7. Bill the Biogeneticist
8. Faith & Wisdom
9. Lobster Boy
10. Miles Davis' Calculator
11. Rapbeth (Foul is Fair)
12. Digest this DJ
13. Strobelights & Special K
14. Transylvania
15. Rhythmic Theories
16. Lego Man
17. Heal
