= The Graduate (MC Lars album) =

Studio album by MC Lars
- Released: March 21, 2006
- Studios: Sapone Productions (Long Island); RMS Studios (Manhattan); Bowl Noodle North (San Francisco); Truck Studios (Oxford); One Good Tem Studios (Los Angeles); Battery Studios (Manhattan)
- Genres: Nerdcore; post-punk; lit hop
- Length: 41:11
- Labels: Horris; Nettwerk
- Producers: Christopher Rojas; Ill Bill; Mike Sapone; Oli Horton; Q-Unique; Steve Dawson; The Rondo Brothers

MC Lars chronology
Radio Pet Fencing (2003)	The Graduate (2006)	The Digital Gangster LP (2008)

Singles from The Graduate
- 1. "Signing Emo" Released: 2005; 2. "Download This Song" Released: 2006; 3. "Ahab" Released: 2006

The Graduate is the fourth full-length studio album by American musician MC Lars. It was released on March 21, 2006 through Horris/Nettwerk Records. Production was mostly handled by Mike Sapone, as well as Christopher Rojas, Ill Bill, Oli Horton, Q-Unique, Steve Dawson and The Rondo Brothers. It features guest appearances from A Scholar And A Physician, Ill Bill, Jaret Reddick, MC Chris, Piney Gir and The Matches.

The album spawned three singles: "Signing Emo", "Download This Song" and "Ahab". "Download This Song" made it to number 29 on the Australian singles chart.

== Critical reception ==
Professional ratings
Review scores
Source	Rating
AllMusic	3.5/5 stars
Alternative Press	3/5
Now	2/5 Ns
PopMatters	3/10
Spin	B+

Alyssa Rashbaum of Spin found Lars' lyrics and cultural observations "both absurdly comical and strangely astute", concluding that: "[W]ith intelligent rhymes about why downloading rocks, Nickelback sucks, and youth is kind, Lars may be preaching to the choir, but at least he has a pulpit to stand behind." AllMusic writer Bret Love was positive towards Lars' wide array of "clever pop culture references" but critiqued that the album's production mostly consisted of "generic laptop DJ stuff", concluding that: "While The Graduate may not be pumping in Jeeps on urban city streets anytime soon (read: ever), it's not difficult to imagine it providing the bong-hit soundtrack for the nation's university dorm rooms." Eddie Fleisher of Alternative Press cautioned readers to not take Lars overly serious for his "hopelessly nerdy quality" and "mixture of satire and pop-culture commentary" throughout the album, saying "it's not the best rap record of all time, but what's refreshing is that it was never intended to be." Tim Perlich of Now wrote that: "The Graduate seems less like the wiseass commentary of a pissed-off bedroom recorder than the contrived gags of a major label flunky with access to market research on iPod buyers. For a comedy album, it's not that funny, but Nettwerk's laughing all the way to the bank." PopMatters writer Dan Raper said: "In his preoccupation with sending up genres such as emo or crunk, his reliance on too-famous samples that hijack Lars' own creativity, and his simple, simplistic delivery, he has failed to create a cohesive or compelling album."

== Track listing ==
No.	Title	Writer(s)	Producer(s)	Length
1.	"Download This Song" (featuring Jaret Reddick)	Andrew Nielsen; Mike Sapone; James Newell Osterberg, Jr.; Denis Roderick Gardiner; Connolly	Mike Sapone	3:44
2.	"The Roommate from Hell" (featuring MC Chris)	Nielsen; Christopher Brendan Ward IV; Christopher Rojas	Christopher Rojas	3:18
3.	"21 Concepts"	Nielsen	Sapone	2:49
4.	"Hot Topic Is Not Punk Rock" (featuring The Matches)	Nielsen	The Rondo Brothers	2:15
5.	"Rapgirl"	Nielsen	Sapone	3:03
6.	"Generic Crunk Rap"	Nielsen; McCombs	Sapone	3:02
7.	"Ahab"	Nielsen; Sapone; Gareth Michael Coombes; Robert Joseph Coombes; Michael Milton Quinn; Daniel Robert Goffey	Sapone	3:21
8.	"iGeneration"	Nielsen; Damondrick Maurion Jack; Piebald	Mike Sapone	2:53
9.	"If I Had a Time Machine, That Would Be Fresh"	Nielsen	Rob Seals (co.)	1:03
10.	"Internet Relationships (Are Not Real Relationships)" (featuring Piney Gir)	Nielsen; Oli Horton; Steve Dawson; Angela Penhaligon	A Scholar And A Physician	3:24
11.	"Space Game"	Nielsen; Moob Arby; Sapone	Sapone	4:05
12.	"The Dialogue" (featuring Ill Bill)	Nielsen; William Braunstein; Anthony Quiles	Ill Bill; Q-Unique	2:53
13.	"Six Degrees of Kurt Cobain"	Nielsen; Sapone	Sapone	1:44
14.	"Signing Emo"	Nielsen; Sapone; Thomas Gates; Thomas Penzone	Sapone	3:37
Total length:				41:11

Notes

- ^{^[co.]} signifies a co-producer.
- "Generic Crunk Rap" features additional vocals by Steve Connelly.

Sample credits

- "Download This Song" samples "The Passenger" by Iggy Pop.
- The song "21 Concepts" samples music from Tetris. When performed live, the background video includes clips of Mega64's popular Tetris video. Additionally, the lyrics parody the song '99 Problems' by Jay-Z.
- The chorus to "Ahab" samples the British band Supergrass performing "Moving" off their self-titled album.
- The song "iGeneration" samples "American Hearts" by Piebald.
- The song "Singing Emo" samples "Cry Tonight" by Hearts That Hate.

== Personnel ==
Credits adapted from the album's booklet.

- Rob Seals – co-producer, additional guitar on "Rapgirl" and "If I Had a Time Machine, That Would Be Fresh"
- Moob Arby – additional synths on "Space Game"
- The Rondo Brothers – additional scratching on "Six Degrees of Kurt Cobain"
- Sandra Waibl – back cover, additional packaging photos
- Chris Owens, Robert Neilsen, Tom Gates, Justin Gaynor, Matt Yazzie, James Louis, Steven Hicks – additional packaging photos
- Kim Kinakin – design and layout (Artwerks Design)
