= Lit Hop =

Works that link literature and hip-hop music

Lit hop (also Lit-hop) is a hybrid art form that combines themes from traditional literature and storytelling with the music and poetics of hip-hop. The term is sometimes used to describe literature that is influenced by hip-hop music and culture, and sometimes used to describe highly literate or lyrically sophisticated hip-hop music. "Lit hop" is also used as a shorthand for any perceived thematic link between literature and hip-hop.

The coining of "Lit hop" is credited to the Canadian writer and performer of turntable-based sound poetry Wayde Compton and independently to the Rutgers University professor and novelist Adam Mansbach.

"Lit-hop" is also the title of a 2006 solo album by the Canadian rap artist Baba Brinkman. Canada's Exclaim! Magazine calls it a "boring album title" but praises the album as a "versatile, skilled debut". Brinkman has also attempted to define "Lit-hop" as a highly literate subgenre of hip-hop through his live performances and recordings, including rap adaptations of Beowulf, the Epic of Gilgamesh, and Geoffrey Chaucer's The Canterbury Tales.

Post-punk Nerdcore rapper MC Lars rapper has used the term numerous times. He uses it in the hook of his song "Flow Like Poe." MC Lars does lectures where he uses modern rap to teach classic literature. During the Covid-19 pandemic, MC Lars used Facebook's live streaming feature to teach literature in a series he calls "Lit-Hop Lockdown Live."
