= Yellowcard (album) =

Studio album by Yellowcard
- Released: September 30, 2016
- Studios: The Lone Tree Recordings; Sound Emporium (Nashville, Tennessee)
- Genre: Alternative rock
- Length: 47:53
- Label: Hopeless
- Producers: Neal Avron; Ryan Key; Ryan Mendez

Yellowcard chronology
Lift a Sail (2014)	Yellowcard (2016)	Childhood Eyes (2023)

Singles from Yellowcard
- 1. "Rest in Peace" Released: June 24, 2016; 2. "The Hurt Is Gone" Released: August 17, 2016; 3. "A Place We Set Afire" Released: April 12, 2017

Professional ratings
Aggregate scores
Source	Rating
Metacritic	75/100
Review scores
Source	Rating
AllMusic	4.5/5 stars
Entertainment Weekly	C+
Sputnikmusic	5/5

Yellowcard is the tenth studio album by American rock band Yellowcard. It was released on September 30, 2016, through Hopeless Records. This was the last album the band released before their breakup in 2017 and reformation in 2022.

== Background ==
On February 24, 2016, Yellowcard announced that they had re-signed with independent label Hopeless Records and had begun work on their next record. The seventh track "Empty Street" was originally recorded as a Big If (ex-bassist Sean O'Donnell and Key's former side project) demo in 2009. The eighth track "I'm a Wrecking Ball" was a demo originally recorded in 2008 by Key, guitarist Ryan Mendez and Dan McLintock of Inspection 12.

Sessions were held at The Lone Tree Recordings in Franklin, Tennessee; drums were recorded at Sound Emporium Studios in Nashville, Tennessee. Ryan Key and Mendez produced and recorded the album, while Neal Avron mixed it at The Casita in Hollywood, California, with assistance from Scott Skrzynski. Additional engineering was done by Will Pugh and Sean Mackin; Ted Jensen mastered the album at Sterling Sound.

== Release ==
On June 7, 2016, Yellowcard was announced for release in September. In addition, the album's track listing and artwork were revealed. The artwork was taken by guitarist Ryan Mendez. On June 24, the band released the record's first single, "Rest in Peace", along with an announcement that the upcoming record and accompanying world tour will be their last. A music video was also released for "Rest in Peace". On August 17, a music video was released for "The Hurt Is Gone". Yellowcard was released on September 30 through Hopeless Records. The f.y.e. edition of the album includes acoustic versions of "What Appears" and "The Hurt Is Gone" as bonus tracks. The group's final shows took place in late March 2017 in California. On April 12, 2017, a music video was released for "A Place We Set Afire".

== Reception ==
The album received mixed-to-positive reviews. A Sputnikmusic user referred to the album as 'a befitting and worthwhile finale to one of the most incredible, memorable rides in the history of pop-punk.' Entertainment Weekly was more critical of the album, citing the album's mid-stage ballad "Leave a Light On" as 'cloying' and 'cringeworthy,' but highlighted the penultimate track "Savior's Robes" as 'irresistibly youthful.'

== Track listing ==
All music by Yellowcard, except where noted. All lyrics by Ryan Key, except where noted.

No.	Title	Lyrics	Music	Length
1.	"Rest in Peace"			4:18
2.	"What Appears"			3:50
3.	"Got Yours"			3:20
4.	"A Place We Set Afire"			4:19
5.	"Leave a Light On"		Yellowcard, Sean O'Donnell	4:47
6.	"The Hurt Is Gone"			6:25
7.	"Empty Street"	Key, O'Donnell		4:47
8.	"I'm a Wrecking Ball"	Key, Dan McLintock		3:57
9.	"Savior's Robes"			5:12
10.	"Fields & Fences"			6:58
Total length:				47:53

Bonus tracks

Japanese/f.y.e. bonus tracks
No.	Title	Length
11.	"What Appears (acoustic)"	3:46
12.	"The Hurt Is Gone (acoustic)"	3:45

== Personnel ==
Personnel per booklet.

Yellowcard

- Ryan Key – lead vocals, guitar, piano
- Sean Mackin – violin, backing vocals, mandolin
- Ryan Mendez – guitar
- Josh Portman – bass

Additional musicians

- Nate Young – drums
- Christine Lightner – cello
- Rodney Wirtz – viola

Production and design

- Neal Avron – executive producer, mixing
- Ryan Key – producer
- Ryan Mendez – producer, photos
- Scott Skrzynski – mix assistant
- Ted Jensen – mastering
- Will Pugh – additional engineering
- Sean Mackin – additional engineering
- Joe Brady – band photos
- Brian Manley – artwork, layout

== Charts ==
Chart (2016)	Peak position
Australian Albums (ARIA)	14
Japanese Top Album Sales (Billboard Japan)	70
Scottish Albums (Official Charts)	80
US Billboard 200	28
US Independent Albums (Billboard)	8
US Top Alternative Albums (Billboard)	5
US Top Rock Albums (Billboard)	10
