= Josh Portman =

American musician (born 1979)

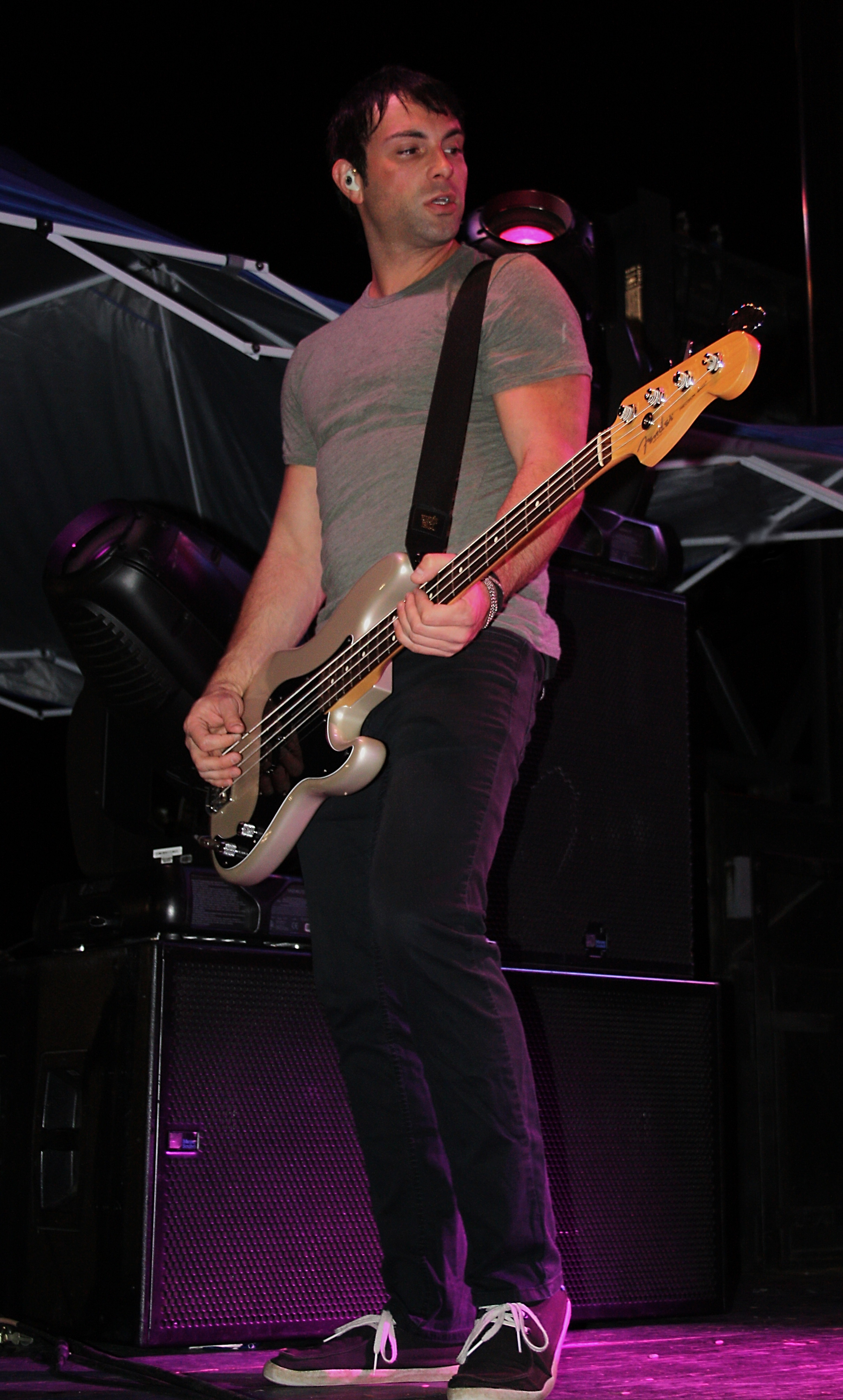
- Portman performing in 2012

Background information
- Born: October 26, 1979 (age 46)
- Origin: Madison, Wisconsin, U.S.
- Genres: Pop-punk; punk rock; post-hardcore; melodic hardcore
- Occupation: Musician
- Instrument: Bass guitar
- Years active: 1994–present
- Member of: Yellowcard
- Formerly of: Near Miss

Joshua David Portman (born October 26, 1979) is an American musician who is best known for playing bass guitar for the rock band Yellowcard since February 2012. Since 1994, he has played bass and guitar in a number of well-known punk/post-hardcore bands including Near Miss and Staring Back.

== Early life ==
Portman was born on October 26, 1979. His younger years were spent living in Madison, WI before moving with his family to Perry, GA upon entering fourth grade. At the age of twelve, Josh received his first guitar and has been writing, recording, and performing ever since. Initially influenced by the glam and thrash metal bands of the '80s, Portman later immersed himself in the post-hardcore and Seattle bands of the early '90s and then the "new school" punk bands of the mid-'90s. He has been a part of many bands that have explored all of these genres.

== Music career ==
=== Early bands (1994–2005) ===
Portman's first band, Zero Racecar, was formed in 1994 in Perry, GA. He joined the band two years later at the age of fifteen and immediately began playing shows throughout Georgia, as well as Florida and the Carolinas. After graduating in 1998, he formed another band in Atlanta called Lancaster with ex-Tsunami Bomb guitarist/current Nothington vocalist Jay Northington. The post-hardcore outfit disbanded after just a year together.

=== Staring-back (2005) ===
In 2005, Portman joined Santa Barbara-based punk band Staring Back. However, the Lobster Records group split up several months later when their lead guitarist/key songwriter Ryan Mendez joined Yellowcard.

=== Near Miss (2006–2007) ===
In 2006, the post-hardcore band Near Miss asked Josh to join. He relocated to their home of Austin, TX and toured extensively with the band all over the U.S., including a spot on the Vans Warped Tour that same year. Near Miss officially broke up in 2007.

=== Great White Lion Snake (2008) ===
After Yellowcard went on "indefinite hiatus" in 2008, Josh Portman left his residence in Atlanta to finish his degree in business at Macon State College. Wanting to still continue pursuing music and performing, he put together an '80s hair metal tribute band called Great White Lion Snake at the end of 2008. Portman's stage name for GWLS is Jef Leppard. They can be seen performing all over Georgia.

=== Big If (2009) ===
On September 14, 2009, Ryan Key and Sean O'Donnell made a MySpace blog post that Portman will be playing lead guitar in their side-project, Big If. The side project was discontinued when Key reformed Yellowcard in 2010 with O'Donnell joining.

=== Yellowcard (2007, 2012–2017, 2022–present) ===
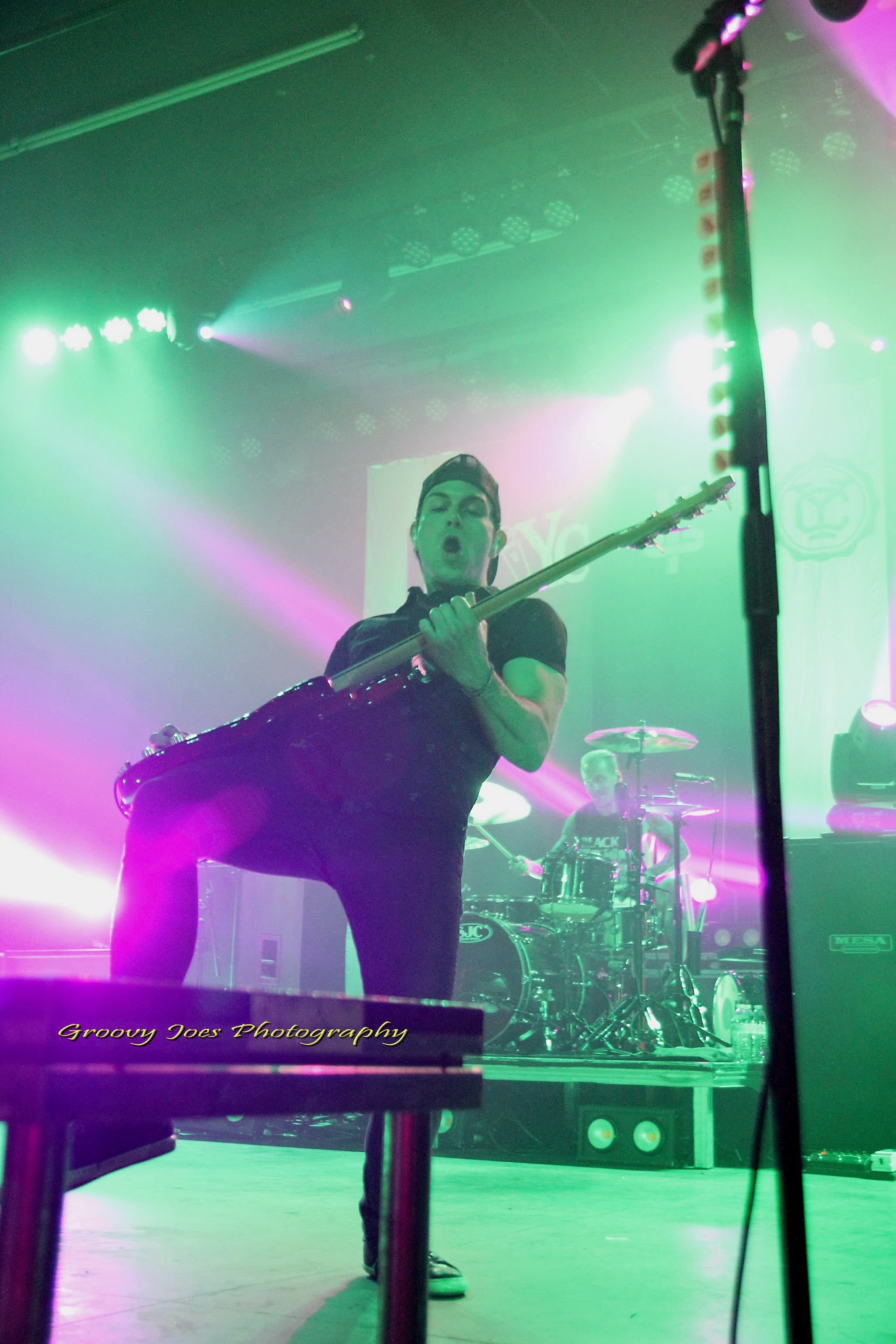
Josh Portman performing in Tempe, Arizona

In 2007, Portman was asked to fill the position of bassist for Yellowcard when Pete Mosely and the band parted ways mid-way through the first U.S. tour for Paper Walls He finished out the tour with Blue October and Shiny Toy Guns, performed on the iTunes only Yellowcard release, "Live from Las Vegas at The Palms", and continued with the band for a 15-day tour in Japan with Linkin Park. The band's next tour was an acoustic venture. After the acoustic tour, they went on "indefinite hiatus". Sean O' Donnell of Reeve Oliver became the bassist when Yellowcard reunited in 2010. After Sean O'Donnell left Yellowcard, Portman returned and was announced as the new permanent bassist on February 17, 2012 and he has been with the band since, including through their hiatus from 2017 until 2022. Yellowcard toured to commemorate the twentieth anniversary of Ocean Avenue in 2023. The band released the EP, Childhood Eyes, on July 21, 2023.

== Discography ==
Yellowcard

- iTunes Live from Las Vegas at the Palms (2008)
- Southern Air (2012)
- Ocean Avenue Acoustic (2013)
- Lift a Sail (2014)
- Yellowcard (2016)
- Childhood Eyes (2023)

Broken Trophy

- Going to Pasalacua / Want EP (2020)
