= E. Von Dahl Killed the Locals =

Studio album by the Matches
- Released: May 11, 2004
- Recorded: 2003–2004
- Studios: Ability Studios (Oakland, California); OCD Studios (Oakland, California)
- Genres: Alternative rock; pop punk
- Length: 39:35
- Label: Epitaph
- Producers: Matt Radosevich; Mike Green; Miles Hurwitz; The Matches

The Matches chronology
E. Von Dahl Killed the Locals (2004)	Decomposer (2006)

Professional ratings
Review scores
Source	Rating
AllMusic	3/5 stars
Rolling Stone	(Favorable)

E. Von Dahl Killed the Locals is the debut studio album by pop punk group the Matches. It was originally self-released on February 7, 2003, and later re-released on May 11, 2004, via Epitaph Records.

The self-release contained the track "Superman", which was removed from the Epitaph re-release because the band felt it would be a good bonus to those fans who had been with them from the beginning. The versions of "Scratched Out" and "The Jack Slap Cheer" that appear on the Epitaph Records version both have changed lyrics due to copyright liability. The Epitaph re-release contained two new tracks, "Borderline Creep" and "More Than Local Boys" although "Superman" was removed and "Scratched Out" was renamed as "Track 11".

The album title is a reference to the band's legal battle with Yvonne Doll and their subsequent name change from the Locals to the Matches.

== Track listing ==
2003 self-released
No.	Title	Writer(s)	Producer(s)	Length
1.	"Dog-Eared Page"	M. Harwood; S. Harris	Matt Radosevich; Miles Hurwitz; The Matches	3:43
2.	"Audio Blood"	M. Harwood; S. Harris	Matt Radosevich; Miles Hurwitz; The Matches; Mike Green (add.)	3:20
3.	"Chain Me Free"	M. Esposito; M. Harwood; S. Harris	Mike Green; Miles Hurwitz; The Matches	3:15
4.	"The Restless"	M. Harwood; S. Harris	Mike Green; Miles Hurwitz; The Matches	3:35
5.	"Superman"	M. Esposito; M. Harwood; S. Harris	Mike Green; Miles Hurwitz; The Matches	3:55
6.	"Eryn Smith"	M. Harwood; S. Harris	Mike Green; Miles Hurwitz; The Matches	3:13
7.	"Say 18"	M. Harwood; S. Harris	Matt Radosevich; Miles Hurwitz; The Matches	2:51
8.	"The Jack Slap Cheer"	M. Esposito; M. Harwood; S. Harris	Mike Green; Miles Hurwitz; The Matches	2:37
9.	"Destination: Nowhere Near"	M. Harwood; S. Harris	Matt Radosevich; Miles Hurwitz; The Matches	2:45
10.	"Sick Little Suicide"	J. San Souci; M. Harwood; S. Harris	Matt Radosevich; Miles Hurwitz; The Matches	4:17
11.	"Scratched Out"	M. Harwood; S. Harris	Mike Green; Miles Hurwitz; The Matches	3:41

2004 Epitaph re-release
No.	Title	Writer(s)	Length
1.	"Dog-Eared Page"	S. Harris; M. Harwood	3:43
2.	"Audio Blood"	S. Harris; M. Harwood	3:20
3.	"Chain Me Free"	S. Harris; M. Harwood; M. Esposito	3:15
4.	"Borderline Creep"	S. Harris; M. Harwood	2:36
5.	"The Restless"	S. Harris; M. Harwood	3:35
6.	"More Than Local Boys"	S. Harris; M. Harwood	3:45
7.	"Eryn Smith"	S. Harris; M. Harwood	3:13
8.	"Say 18"	S. Harris; M. Harwood	2:51
9.	"The Jack Slap Cheer"	S. Harris; M. Harwood; M. Esposito	2:37
10.	"Destination: Nowhere Near"	S. Harris; M. Harwood	2:45
11.	"Sick Little Suicide"	S. Harris; M. Harwood; J. San Souci	4:17
12.	"Scratched Out" (Track 11)	S. Harris; M. Harwood	3:41
Total length:			39:35

== Personnel ==
The following credits are presented for the original 2003 release, adapted from Discogs

- Shawn Harris – lyrics, vocals, guitar, artwork
- Justin San Souci – lyrics (track 10), vocals, bass, artwork
- Jonathan Devoto – vocals, guitar
- Matt Whalen – drums
- Mike Harwood – lyrics
- Matt Esposito – lyrics (tracks: 3, 5, 8)
- Vanessa Harris – vocals (track 11)
- Rene Carranza – synthesizer, percussion & keyboards (track 11)
- Mo Juanson – blues harp (track 9)
- Mike Green – additional guitar (track 4), engineering (tracks: 1, 2, 10), additional producer (track 2), producer & recording (tracks: 3–6, 8, 11)
- Matt Radosevich – producer & recording (tracks: 1, 2, 7, 9, 10)
- Alex Studer – engineering (track 4)
- Miles Hurwitz – producer, management
- Mark Chalecki – mastering
- Gene Grimaldi – mastering (for Epitaph re-release only)
- Joe Barresi – producer & mixing (for Epitaph re-release only)

== Release history ==
Region	Date	Format(s)	Label(s)
United States	February 7, 2003	CD	Self-released
Europe	May 10, 2004	CD; digital download	Epitaph Records
United States	May 11, 2004	CD; digital download	Epitaph Records
