= Baba Brinkman =

Canadian rapper and playwright

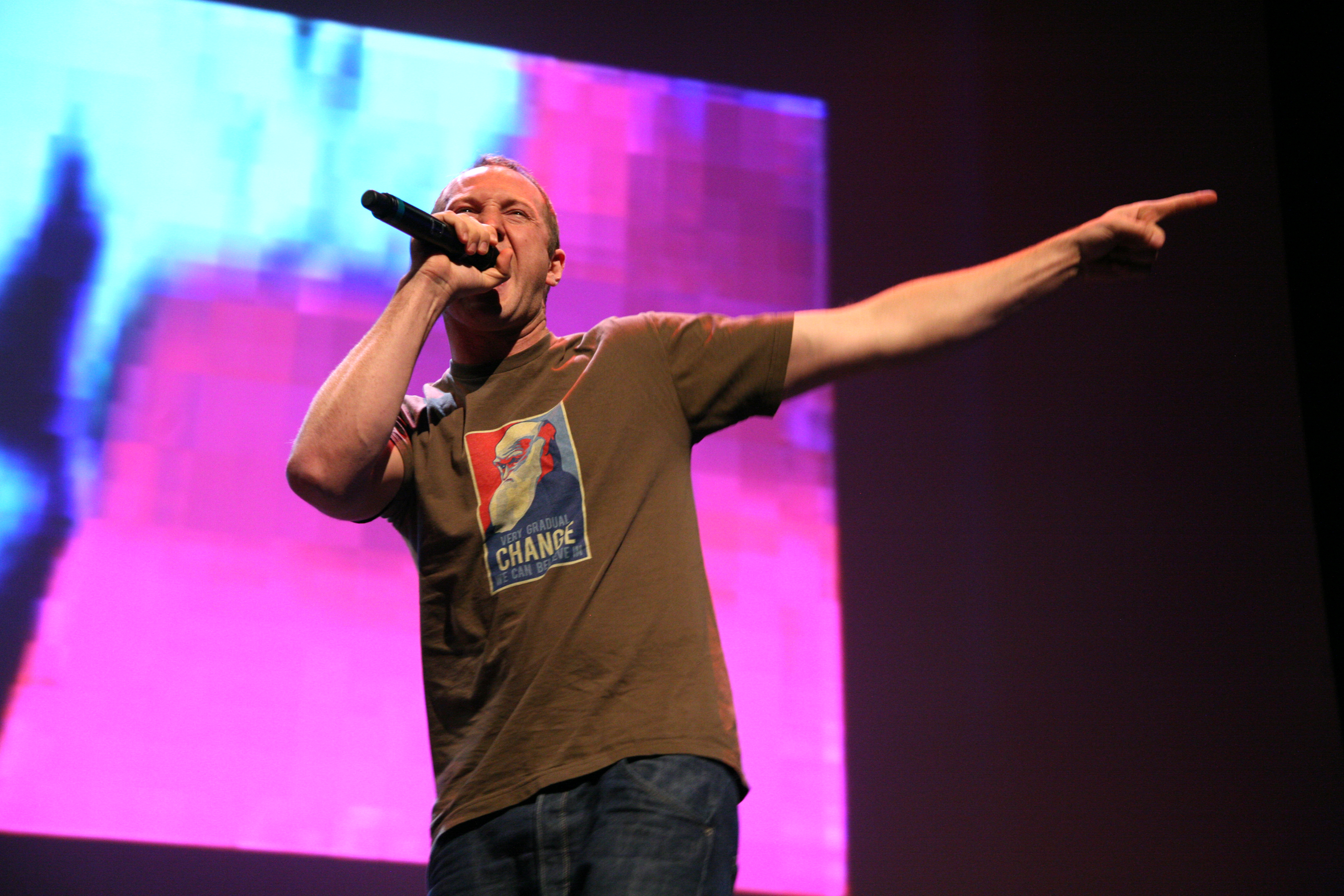
- Baba Brinkman presenting, performing at the Cusp Conference 2010, Chicago, IL
- Born: Dirk Murray Brinkman; October 22, 1978 (age 48); Riondel, British Columbia, Canada
- Other name: Baba Brinkman
- Family: Joyce Murray (mother)
- Musical career
- Origin: Vancouver, British Columbia, Canada
- Genre: Canadian hip hop
- Occupations: Poet; rapper; playwright
- Years active: 2004–present
- Website: bababrinkman.com

Dirk Murray Brinkman (born October 22, 1978) is a Canadian rapper and playwright best known for recordings and performances that combine hip hop music with literature, theatre, and science.

== Early life and education ==
Born in the remote community of Riondel, British Columbia, in a log cabin built by his parents, Brinkman is the eldest of three children of Joyce Murray, a Member of the Parliament of Canada, and Dirk Brinkman, Sr., who is notable for having founded the world's only private company responsible for planting more than one billion trees. Dirk Sr gave Brinkman the honorific nickname "Baba" at birth, because of his son's contemplative, Buddha-like expression. Brinkman's childhood was divided between Vancouver and the Kootenay region of British Columbia.

Brinkman spent his early summers in remote tree planting camps, and began planting trees himself at the age of 15. He worked for his parents' business, Brinkman & Associates Reforestation, for twelve seasons in British Columbia and Alberta, personally planting more than one million trees. During this period he also earned a Bachelor of Arts degree in English literature from Simon Fraser University and a Master of Arts degree in comparative literature from the University of Victoria, Canada. He studied human evolution and primatology with the orangutan researcher Biruté Galdikas and wrote his thesis comparing modern Hip hop freestyle battling with The Canterbury Tales by Geoffrey Chaucer.

== Career ==
=== Literature rap ===
Brinkman first gained widespread media attention for his one-man show The Rap Canterbury Tales, devised as a means of re-telling Chaucer's iconic stories for a modern audience. The show premiered at the Edinburgh Festival Fringe in 2004, and the following year Brinkman was sponsored by Cambridge University to perform the show in British secondary schools. The Rap Canterbury Tales was published as an illustrated paperback by Talon Books in 2006.

Brinkman's 2010 follow-up show, Rapconteur, premiered at the Edinburgh Free Fringe and featured hip hop adaptations of Beowulf, the Epic of Gilgamesh, and the Finnish Kalevala.

In 2011, Brinkman premiered The Canterbury Tales Remixed at the Soho Playhouse in New York City. The show combined material from Rapconteur with new adaptations of The Merchant's Tale, The Pardoner's Tale, and The Wife of Bath's Tale and was released as a full-length album in 2012.

Because of his interest in merging hip-hop and classic literature, Brinkman has referred to his style of rap as Lit Hop, which was also the title of his 2006 solo rap album.

=== Science rap ===
In 2008, Brinkman was commissioned to write a new rap show about evolution by Mark Pallen, microbiologist and author of The Rough Guide to Evolution. The result was The Rap Guide to Evolution, a hip hop homage to Charles Darwin which Brinkman first performed in Britain for the Darwin bicentennial in February 2009. Because the lyrics were fact-checked for scientific accuracy, Pallen calls it "the first peer-reviewed rap". Brinkman cites Richard Dawkins, David Sloan Wilson, Jared Diamond, Geoffrey Miller, and E. O. Wilson as his influences in writing the show.

The Rap Guide to Evolution premiered at the 2009 Edinburgh Festival Fringe, winning a Fringe First Award from The Scotsman for best new theatre writing. In 2010, the UK's largest biomedical charity, the Wellcome Trust, provided grant funding for Brinkman to make a series of educational music videos based on the show, as a resource for biology teachers. The Rap Guide to Evolution completed a five-month Off-Broadway theatre run in November 2011, for which Brinkman received a 2012 Drama Desk Award nomination for Outstanding Solo Performance, losing to Irish actor Cillian Murphy.

The Rap Guide to Evolution won the National Center for Science Education's 2013 Friend of Darwin Award. and Brinkman has performed selections from his production on The Rachel Maddow Show and at the Seattle Science Festival, sharing the stage with Jurassic Park palaeontologist Jack Horner and British physicist Stephen Hawking.

In 2010, Brinkman produced a Rationalist Anthem called Off That, attacking various forms of pseudoscience. The song was inspired by the Jay Z track of the same name, which is featured on The Blueprint 3 album. The video for Brinkman's unauthorized remix was released as part of an online science music festival called Geek Pop and was popular with atheist blogs.

Brinkman followed up his Darwin tribute with a sequel show specifically about evolutionary psychology, The Rap Guide to Human Nature, which premiered at the Edinburgh Fringe in 2010. The album features peer review phone messages from David Buss, Olivia Judson, and David Sloan Wilson commenting on the science content in Brinkman's lyrics. In 2012, Human Nature was adapted into a theatre production, Ingenious Nature, which ran off-Broadway from November 2012 through January 2013.

In March 2012, Brinkman was announced as a songwriter-in-residence at the National Institute for Mathematical and Biological Synthesis (NIMBioS) and spent a month at the University of Tennessee Knoxville as a guest of the Institute, along with DJ and music producer Jamie Simmonds. Brinkman later released The Infomatic EP, a collection of hip-hop songs inspired by computational biology.

Brinkman's next play, The Rap Guide to Religion, premiered at the 2014 Edinburgh Fringe, before transferring to the Soho Playhouse for an off-Broadway run in October 2014. The production ran for seven months and was a Time Out New York and New York Times Critics' Pick, as well as receiving a 2015 Drama Desk Award nomination in the category "Unique Theatrical Experience". The show explores theories from the cognitive science of religion and promotes religious naturalism, prompting American Humanist Association magazine to refer to Brinkman as "atheism's best salesman".

In 2015, Brinkman was commissioned by Arizona State University and Randolph M. Nesse to write and produce an album titled The Rap Guide to Medicine, which communicates themes from evolutionary medicine. Nesse said of the finished project: "This is amazing. I won't need to teach my course, I'll just have students listen to the album!" The album includes songs about Mendelian disease, parasitology, somatic evolution in cancer, mismatch theory, and senescence.

In 2014 and 2016, Brinkman attended the Science of Consciousness conference in Tucson, AZ, performing a Rap Up or daily rap summary of the conference talks on Neuroscience and Philosophy of Mind. Computational neuroscientist Anil Seth saw Brinkman's performances and proposed they collaborate on a new show about the neuroscience of consciousness. Brinkman premiered "Rap Guide to Consciousness" at the 2017 Brighton Fringe, Winnipeg Fringe and Edinburgh Fringe to critical acclaim. The show explores several neurobiological theories of consciousness, including Global Workspace Theory, Integrated Information Theory, and predictive coding, as well as the Philosophical Zombie, Free Will, Materialism, and Memetics.

=== Environment and ecology rap ===
Brinkman was commissioned by the WILD Foundation to produce The Rap Guide to Wilderness in 2014. The album was critically acclaimed and features songs about biodiversity, extinction, conservation, habitat loss, and trophic cascade.

In 2015, Brinkman's play Rap Guide to Climate Chaos premiered at the Edinburgh Fringe, followed by performances at the COP21 United Nations Climate Change Conference. "Climate Chaos" went on to play-off-Broadway for six months in 2016, and featured Michael E. Mann, Gavin Schmidt, Naomi Oreskes and Bill Nye as talkback speakers. Bill Nye also features on the album version of "Climate Chaos", rapping the chorus of the track "What's Beef", which remixes a Notorious B.I.G. song to discuss climate change denial. Rap Guide to Climate Chaos summarizes the science, politics, and economics of climate change and advocates for a global carbon tax as part of the solution.

In 2016, after the election of Donald Trump, Brinkman worked with Gary Yohe at Wesleyan University, a senior contributor to the Intergovernmental Panel on Climate Change (IPCC) and co-recipient along with Al Gore of the 2007 Nobel Peace Prize, to produce a new song and video titled "Erosion", summarizing data from the National Climate Assessment on the U.S.-based physical impacts of climate change.

=== Event Rap ===
In 2021, Brinkman founded Event Rap, a custom rap agency featuring a roster of independent hip-hop artists who write and perform original works for live events, as well as producing new rap videos on commission. Clients of Brinkman's private company have included Facebook, Republic, MIT, Product Hunt, and the Foundation for Individual Rights and Expression (FIRE), supporting the production of new custom songs and videos on a wide range of topics, from rap summaries of virtual meetings and PhD defenses, to educational and promotional custom rap content.

Brinkman credits his inspiration for Event Rap to the "Renaissance patronage model" and views the role of today's Event Rap artists as similar to ancient bards, griots, and occasional verse. The title track of his 2023 album Rapsode makes a similar argument, likening today's rappers-for-hire to the rhapsode tradition of ancient Greece, where professional poets would stitch together myths, tales and jokes with improvisational skill to suit the present listening audience.

In addition to Brinkman himself, other notable members of the Event Rap artist roster include Abdominal, Kosha Dillz, and Mega Ran, as well as Freestyle Love Supreme regular Dizzy Senze and Brooklyn rapper Dex McBean, whose rap video about Carbon Dioxide Removal (CDR) was featured on the United Nations Environment Program's "Decade on Restoration" initiative.

=== Controversy ===
Teachers have also expressed concern about Brinkman's use of strong language and anti-religious sentiments in his educational performances and videos.

Brinkman himself has been described as an "evangelical atheist" and has blogged about his encounters with creationists, both in educational settings and within his own family. He also performed in support of the Military Association of Atheists & Freethinkers Rock Beyond Belief concert alongside Richard Dawkins at Fort Bragg, North Carolina, in 2012.

Ingenious Nature was reviewed unfavorably, and Brinkman received criticism for "singling out women in the audience, pointing at them, and rapping about their ovulation cycles," among other things.

The song "Tranquility Bank" from The Rap Guide to Wilderness received a hostile response from some environmentalists because of its assertion that urban living is better for the environment than back-to-the-land movements.

=== Theatre ===
- 2004: The Rap Canterbury Tales
- 2008: The Rebel Cell (co-written with Dizraeli)
- 2009: The Rap Guide to Evolution
- 2010: Rapconteur
- 2010: The Rap Guide to Human Nature
- 2011: The Canterbury Tales Remixed
- 2012: Ingenious Nature
- 2014: The Rap Guide to Religion
- 2015: The Rap Guide to Climate Chaos
- 2017: The Rap Guide to Consciousness

=== Discography ===
- 2004: Swordplay
- 2004: The Rap Canterbury Tales
- 2005: Pandemonium
- 2006: Lit-Hop
- 2008: Mine the Gap (Mud Sun)
- 2008: The Rebel Cell (Mud Sun)
- 2009: The Rap Guide to Evolution
- 2009: Apocalyptic Utopian Dreams in the Western Wilderness
- 2010: Rapconteur
- 2010: The Rap Guide to Human Nature
- 2011: The Rap Guide to Evolution: Revised
- 2011: The Rap Guide to Business
- 2012: The Canterbury Tales Remixed
- 2012: The Infomatic EP
- 2014: The Rap Guide to Wilderness
- 2015: The Rap Guide to Medicine
- 2015: The Rap Guide to Religion
- 2016: The Rap Guide to Climate Chaos
- 2017: The Rap Guide to Consciousness
- 2019: See From Space
- 2021: Bright Future
- 2023: Rapsode

== Publications ==
- The Rap Canterbury Tales, Talon Books 2006
- The Speciation of Rap: The Evolutionary Review, Volume 2, March 2011
- Finding 'God' in the Female Orgasm: The Evolutionary Review, Volume 3, May 2012
- Darwin On The Mic: Evolution, Volume 69, Issue 5
