= Decomposer (album) =

Studio album by The Matches
- Released: September 11, 2006
- Studios: Barefoot Studios (Hollywood, California); The Treefort (Los Angeles); Foxy Studios (Marina del Rey, California); Skyline Studios (Oakland, California); Opra Music (Los Angeles); The Hive (Los Angeles); Sound City Studios (Los Angeles)
- Genres: Art punk; indie rock; pop punk; post-punk revival
- Length: 44:45
- Label: Epitaph
- Producers: Miles Hurwitz; Mark Hoppus; Matt Radosevich; John Feldmann; Mike Green; Johnny Genius; Ryan Divine; Nick Hexum; Tim Armstrong; Brett Gurewitz

The Matches chronology
E. Von Dahl Killed the Locals (2004)	Decomposer (2006)	A Band in Hope (2008)

Professional ratings
Review scores
Source	Rating
AbsolutePunk	95%
AllMusic	4/5 stars

Decomposer is the second studio album by American pop punk band The Matches. It was released by Epitaph Records on September 11, 2006, worldwide, on September 12, 2006, in the United States, and in 2016 on vinyl. Audio production was handled by Matt Rad, Mike Green, Ryan Divine & Johnny Genius, Miles Hurwitz, Blink-182's Mark Hoppus, Goldfinger's John Feldmann, Rancid's Tim Armstrong, 311's Nick Hexum, and Bad Religion's Brett Gurewitz.

Decomposer also marks a vast departure from The Matches' previous strict alternative/punk sound and a growth into a more avant-garde and art rock sound. Additionally, many of the lyrical themes explored on Decomposer were resurrected for their next offering, 2008's A Band in Hope.

The album peaked at number 18 on the US Billboard Independent Albums.

== Track listing ==
All lyrics are written by Shawn Harris.

No.	Title	Producer(s)	Length
1.	"Salty Eyes"	Matt Rad	2:38
2.	"Drive"	Mike Green	3:26
3.	"Papercut Skin"	John Feldmann	3:25
4.	"Clumsy Heart"	Miles Hurwitz	3:31
5.	"Little Maggots"	John Feldmann	2:44
6.	"What Katie Said"	Mark Hoppus	2:53
7.	"Sunburn vs. the Rhinovirus"	Mark Hoppus	3:45
8.	"Lazier Than Furniture"	Divine Genius Productions	2:36
9.	"Didi (My Doe, Part 2)"	Nick Hexum	3:11
10.	"You (Don't) Know Me" (featuring Tim Armstrong)	Tim Armstrong	4:05
11.	"My Soft and Deep"	Brett Gurewitz	3:36
12.	"Shoot Me in the Smile"	Matt Rad	3:31
13.	"The Barber's Unhappiness"	Mark Hoppus	5:24
Total length:			44:45

UK / European bonus track (B-side to "Salty Eyes" single)
No.	Title	Producer	Length
14.	"Here's to Love" (featuring Simon Neil of Biffy Clyro)	John Paulsen	3:08

== Personnel ==
Adapted from AllMusic and Discogs.

- Shawn Harris – guitar, vocals, artwork (booklet), design
- Jonathan Devoto – guitar, vocals; vibraphone (track 1)
- Justin San Souci – bass, vocals
- Matt Whalen – drums; toaster percussion (track 3)
- Lewis Patzner – cello (track 1)
- Anton Patzner – strings, violin and viola (track 1)
- Ben Richards – keyboards (track 2)
- Dean Butterworth – percussion (track 3), loops (track 5)
- Josie Shafer – Fender Rhodes electric piano (track 10)
- Ben Kramer – trumpet (track 10)
- Matt Radosevich – mixing (tracks: 1–2, 4, 6–12), engineering and production (tracks: 1, 12)
- Mike Green – programming, engineering and production (track 2)
- John Feldmann – drum programming and additional percussion (track 5), mixing, engineering and production (tracks: 3, 5)
- Matt Appleton – engineering (tracks: 3, 5)
- Miles Hurwitz – production (track 4), executive production
- Johnny Genius – percussion (track 4), engineering (tracks: 4, 8), production (track 8)
- Ryan Divine – engineering (tracks: 4, 8), production (track 8)
- Marco Martin – additional engineering (track 4)
- Mark Hoppus – percussion (track 6), drum programming (track 13), production (tracks 6–7, 13)
- Christopher Holmes – drum programming (track 13), engineering (tracks 6–7, 13)
- Nicholas Hexum – production (track 9)
- Giff Tripp – engineering (track 9)
- Jason Walters – additional engineering (track 9)
- Tim Armstrong – additional vocals and percussion, production (track 10)
- Michael Rosen – engineering (track 10)
- Brett Gurewitz – backing vocals, percussion and production (track 11)
- Pete Martinez – engineering (track 11)
- Chris Roach – additional engineering (track 12)
- John Morrical – engineering
- Josh Smith – engineering
- Tom Baker – mastering
- Emilee Seymour – artwork, design

== Charts ==
Chart performance for Decomposer
Chart (2006)	Peak position
US Independent Albums (Billboard)	18
