= Childhood Eyes =

EP by Yellowcard
- Released: July 21, 2023
- Genre: Pop-punk
- Length: 18:23
- Label: Equal Vision
- Producer: Neal Avron

Yellowcard chronology
Yellowcard (2016)	Childhood Eyes (2023)	Better Days (2025)

Singles from Childhood Eyes
- 1. "Childhood Eyes" Released: May 31, 2023; 2. "The Places We'll Go" Released: July 21, 2023; 3. "Three Minutes More" Released: July 21, 2023

Childhood Eyes is an EP recorded by American rock band Yellowcard. It was released on July 21, 2023 through Equal Vision Records, and was their only release on the label. Executive produced by the band's long-time collaborator Neal Avron, the project marks the band's first studio material in nearly seven years, following their self-titled album in 2016, subsequent breakup the following year, and reformation in 2022.

== Background ==
Yellowcard disbanded in March 2017 following the release of their eponymous final album and supporting world tour. In an interview for Entertainment Weekly, lead vocalist Ryan Key said: "I truly never believed I'd be doing anything with Yellowcard again. We had all moved on, and Yellowcard was a closed book in our past." Key went on to detail getting an invitation for the band to reunite at Riot Fest in September 2022, stating: "That phone call came in and changed our lives forever. You don't want to talk about money, right? But that's what got us on the phone. Some of us in the band hadn't spoken in six years at that point — no communication whatsoever."

The band embarked on a 20th anniversary tour for their major label debut Ocean Avenue the following summer, with Key describing the tour to Rolling Stone as the "biggest" tour of the band's career; "It’s funny how we don’t feel like we are chasing anything anymore. It’s safe to say that the band is bigger than we’ve ever been in our entire career right now." Key continued, "We’ve never played any of these venues. I was afraid that I was going to have this sort of, “where have you been all my life?” mentality for all the people at these shows. Instead, I’m filled with an unbelievable sense of gratitude. We’re playing for between five and seven thousand people a night."

Violinist Sean Mackin told Get Some Magazine, "Yellowcard’s return was fueled by a reunion show to celebrate Ocean Avenue for Riot Fest, and that enthusiastic welcome fueled a full tour and an uncertain future for our band. We never imagined we would have the opportunity to write new music or play any shows of this magnitude, so this has been a very shocking and lovely surprise. We were really excited to work with Equal Vision because they were excited to work with us, and they have been very supportive throughout the whole process."

Key also told Alternative Press that "the body was cold for Yellowcard. For those of us that hadn't communicated in many years after the end of the band, there really was a coming together and a reconciling, and there was a feeling of camaraderie and brotherhood and friendship again in the room."

After the band had reconciled their personal and creative differences, they signed with Equal Vision Records and entered the studio to record a 5-track EP. The title track was released as the first single on May 31, 2023, and the project was released in full on July 21.

== Track listing ==
Adapted from Apple Music. All lyrics by Ryan Key. All music by Yellowcard.

No.	Title	Length
1.	"Three Minutes More" (feat. Vic Fuentes of Pierce the Veil)	3:23
2.	"Childhood Eyes"	3:13
3.	"Hiding in the Light"	3:09
4.	"Honest from the Jump"	4:26
5.	"The Places We'll Go" (feat. Chris Carrabba of Dashboard Confessional)	4:10
Total length:		18:23

== Reception ==
Professional ratings
Review scores
Source	Rating
Sputnikmusic	4.5/5 stars
Distorted Sound	8/10 stars

Childhood Eyes received positive reception from critics. Louis Suffill of Distorted Sound heralded Childhood Eyes as "dripping with pop-punk nostalgia, catchy rhythms, and a sound like they’d never even been on hiatus." Kathleen Crooks of Boolin Tunes called the EP a "solid mix of nostalgic leanings and modern refinery, Childhood Eyes is a mature realization of sound for a veteran group returning to form after an extended time apart."

== Personnel ==
Adapted from Childhood Eyes liner notes

Yellowcard

- Ryan Key – lead vocals, guitar
- Sean Mackin – violin, backing vocals
- Ryan Mendez – guitar
- Josh Portman – bass

Additional musicians

- Nate Young – drums
- Vic Fuentes – guest vocals on "Three Minutes More"
- Chris Carrabba – guest vocals on "The Places We'll Go"

Production and design

- Neal Avron – executive producer, mixing
- Ryan Key – producer
- Ryan Mendez – producer
- Scott Skrzynski – mix assistant
- Ted Jensen – mastering
- Tim McTague – drum engineering
- JJ Revell – drum engineering
- Erich Talaba – violin, viola and mandolin production/engineering
- Brandon Stecz – artwork, layout design
- Jessica Steele – photography

== Charts ==
Chart performance for Childhood Eyes
Chart (2023)	Peak position
US Top Album Sales (Billboard)	78
US Top Current Album Sales (Billboard)	46
