= The Matches Album 4, Unreleased; Graphics? Title? Or Not Needed? =

the Matches album 4, unreleased; graphics? title? or not needed?
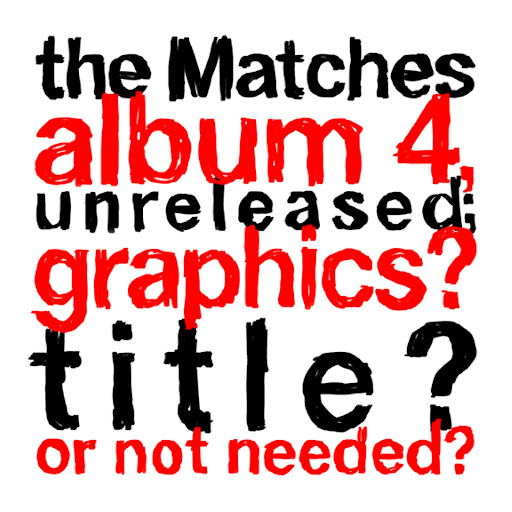

Studio album by The Matches
- Released: August 12, 2009
- Studio: Talking House Productions, San Francisco
- Length: 33:02
- Label: Self-released
- Producer: John Paulsen; Miles Hurwitz

The Matches chronology
A Band in Hope (2008)	the Matches album 4, unreleased; graphics? title? or not needed? (2009)

the Matches album 4, unreleased; graphics? title? or not needed? is the fourth studio album by The Matches; it comprises the final original studio recordings from The Matches prior to their hiatus. Recorded at Talking House Productions studios, the bulk of the album was produced by John Paulsen, with two tracks produced by Miles Hurwitz. It was self-released to download and streaming services on August 12, 2009.

== Release ==
The band released a message saying:

After our hiatus announcement in July, we were surprised by the big wave of fans' comments (on myspace and various blogs and message boards) - very passionate, very disappointed, so we paid attention to the pleas to put out unreleased songs and demos. We just finished pulling together and mastering this set of ten songs. They are very mint.

== Track listing ==
All lyrics are written by Shawn Harris.

No.	Title	Producer(s)	Length
1.	"It's My Day"	John Paulsen	3:01
2.	"Wicked Walk"	John Paulsen	3:46
3.	"Like Yesterday"	Miles Hurwitz	3:32
4.	"Here's to Love" (acoustic; featuring Simon Neil of Biffy Clyro)	John Paulsen	3:07
5.	"I Tried (So Hard)"	John Paulsen	3:28
6.	"Needs and Wants"	John Paulsen	3:14
7.	"50 Altered States"	John Paulsen	3:14
8.	"If Nothing Else"	John Paulsen	2:51
9.	"Nothing's Going On"	Miles Hurwitz	3:14
10.	"My Doe, Part 1" (acoustic; featuring Simon Neil of Biffy Clyro)	John Paulsen	3:35
Total length:			33:02
