= This Gigantic Robot Kills =

Studio album by MC Lars
- Released: February 24, 2009
- Recorded: 2006–2008
- Genres: Nerdcore; ska punk; West Coast hip-hop
- Length: 46:40
- Label: Horris/Oglio/Crappy

MC Lars chronology
The Digital Gangster LP (2008)	This Gigantic Robot Kills (2009)	Single and Famous (2009)

Professional ratings
Review scores
Source	Rating
AllMusic	3.5/5 stars

This Gigantic Robot Kills is the fourth album by nerdcore musician MC Lars. For the album, Lars got several artists to feature on multiple songs, with "Weird Al" Yankovic, Wheatus, Pierre Bouvier, Suburban Legends, MC Bat Commander, Jesse Dangerously, Amie Miriello, Parry Gripp, Paul Gilbert, MC Frontalot, Jonathan Coulton, YTCracker, K.Flay, Gabe Saporta, Brett Anderson, and Worm Quartet. For instrumentals and general writing, Lars collaborated with the Keyboard Choir, The Rondo Brothers, Walt Ribeiro, Mike Kennedy, Steven Conolly, Nick Rowe, Joe Ragosta, Aesias Finale, Linus of Hollywood, James Bourne, Terrible D., Daniel Dart, and Nick Conceller.

There are several samples and interpolations within this album. "Hey There Ophelia" samples and interpolates "Screamager" by Northern Irish band Therapy?, "White Kids Aren't Hyphy" is loosely based on the song "I Wish" by Skee-Lo., and "No Logo" samples "Waiting Room" by Fugazi.

The title of the album is a tribute to Wesley Willis, who was sampled in a 2000 interview with Lars at the end of the MC Lars song "Yes, I Am an Alien" as well as the beginning of the song "True Player for Real". In both songs, Wesley says that he will write a song about Lars on his new album, called "This Gigantic Robot Kills". In 2003, Willis passed away at 40 years of age.

== Track listing ==
All lyrics are written by MC Lars except for noted additional lyricists & track 14.

No.	Title	Lyrics	Music	Length
1.	"Where Ya Been Lars?"		the Keyboard Choir, the Rondo Brothers, Walt Ribeiro	1:20
2.	"True Player for Real (featuring "Weird Al" Yankovic and Wheatus)"		Brendan Brown, Phil Jimenez [sic]	3:33
3.	"Hipster Girl"		Mike Kennedy, Steven Conolly	3:42
4.	"It's Not Easy (Being Green) (featuring Pierre Bouvier of Simple Plan)"		Mike Kennedy, Nick Rowe, Pierre Bouvier	3:42
5.	"This Gigantic Robot Kills (featuring Suburban Legends and MC Bat Commander)"		Joe Ragosta, Suburban Legends	2:49
6.	"No Logo (featuring Jesse Dangerously)"	Jesse Dangerously	Fugazi, the Rondo Brothers, K.Flay	3:04
7.	"35 Laurel Drive"		Aesias Finale, the Rondo Brothers, Linus of Hollywood	2:49
8.	"Twenty-Three (featuring Amie Miriello)"		James Bourne	3:47
9.	"Guitar Hero Hero (Beating Guitar Hero Doesn't Make You Slash) (featuring Parry Gripp and Paul Gilbert)"		Terrible D., Daniel Dart, Paul Gilbert	4:03
10.	"O.G. Original Gamer (featuring MC Frontalot and Jonathan Coulton)"	MC Frontalot, Jonathan Coulton	Jonathan Coulton, K.Flay, Linus of Hollywood	3:42
11.	"We Have Arrived (featuring K.Flay, YTCracker and the Former Fat Boys)"	K.Flay, YTCracker, the Former Fat Boys	Aesias Finale	3:30
12.	"White Kids Aren't Hyphy"		Nick Conceller	3:16
13.	"Hey There Ophelia (featuring Gabe Saporta and Brett Anderson)"	K.Flay on 1st verse	Mike Kennedy, Therapy?	4:27
14.	"(Lord It's Hard to Be Happy When You're Not) Using the Metric System (featuring Worm Quartet)" (Atom & His Package cover)	Adam Goren	Adam Goren	2:49
Total length:				46:40
