= Near Miss =

- Origin: Austin, Texas, U.S.
- Genres: Punk rock; pop-punk; post-hardcore; melodic hardcore
- Years active: 2001–2008
- Labels: Fearless; Takeover
- Spinoff of: Bigwig
- Past members: Max Béchard; Jeremy Hernandez; Mychael Bingham; Sean Cockrell; Tony Diaz; Joshua Portman

NearMiss was an American punk rock band from Austin, Texas, United States.

== History ==
NearMiss was founded in 2001 by two former members of Bigwig, who recorded a 4-song demo that year. After expanding to a four-piece, the group signed to Fearless Records, releasing their debut full-length in the summer of 2002. The album was produced by Cameron Webb. The group toured frequently for the next several years, playing several Warped Tour festivals and going on the road with Sum 41, The Vandals, Gob, Rise Against, and The Lawrence Arms. Guitarist Sean Cockrell left the group in 2002; they worked as a three-piece until 2006, when Tony Diaz joined the group on guitar and later Joshua Portman. The group appeared on a three-way split album with The Matches and Reeve Oliver in 2005, then toured with Killradio before releasing their second album on Takeover Records in 2006. In 2007, the band went on several interests. Hernandez formed A Balance Between, Bingham formed Grenadier and Portman toured with Yellowcard after Pete Mosely left. They later split, though they are still planning a farewell show. The following year, Portman formed an all-80's hair metal tribute band called Great White Lion Snake.

On September 14, 2009, Ryan Key and Sean O'Donnell made a MySpace blog post that Portman will be playing lead guitar in their band, Big If. Although the band was quietly discontinued.

Portman went on to play bass for Yellowcard in February 2012 until March 2017.

== Members ==
Final line-up

- Max Béchard - drums (2001-2008)
- Jeremy Hernandez - vocals, guitar (2001-2008)
- Mychael Bingham - bass (2001-2008)
- Joshua Portman - guitar (2006-2008)

Former members

- Sean Cockrell - guitar (2001-2002)
- Tony Diaz - guitar (2005)

== Discography ==
- The Gentle Art of Making Enemies (Fearless Records, 2002)
- Testing the Ends of What They'll Put Up With (Takeover Records, 2006)
