= Walt Ribeiro =

American composer of classical music (born 1984)

- Born: January 25, 1984 (age 42)
- Genres: Classical, jazz
- Occupations: Composer, arranger, musician, teacher
- Instruments: Guitar, piano
- Years active: 2000–present
- Website: fororchestra.com

Walt Ribeiro (born January 25, 1984) is an American composer of classical music. He was born in New Jersey. His work has been primarily distributed via the internet. His symphony I.I was written for an 80-piece orchestra, but produced using orchestral sampling software. Ribeiro is also notable for his music tutorials available via web sites such as YouTube, which he ended in October 2009. That same year he launched For Orchestra where he arranged pop songs for orchestra. He has arranged covers of songs by Lady Gaga, Radiohead, Pearl Jam, Rimsky-Korsakov, MGMT and PSY, along with others. It has since been featured on Comedy Central Tosh. O, Perez Hilton (for his Lady Gaga arrangements), Green Plastic (for his Radiohead arrangement) and more.

He suffered an accident on October 10, 2015, at which point he decided to take a break from his YouTube and composing activities in order to recover.
