= The Zombie Dinosaur LP =

Studio album by MC Lars
- Released: November 6, 2015
- Recorded: 2013 – 2015
- Genres: Nerdcore; ska punk; West Coast hip-hop
- Length: 40:59
- Labels: Horris; Crappy; Oglio; Toxic Toast
- Producers: MC Lars; Jim Greer; Damondrick Jack

MC Lars chronology
22 Concepts (But a Hit Definitely Still Ain't One) (2015)	The Zombie Dinosaur LP (2015)	Donald Trump Has Really Bad Morals (2016)

Professional ratings
Review scores
Source	Rating
AutographVirus	3.9 stars on a 5 point scale
Bucketlist	4/5 stars
The Front Row Report	3/5 stars
PopMatters	2.5/5 stars
ReadJunk	4.5/5 stars

The Zombie Dinosaur LP is the fourth studio album by MC Lars, released on November 6, 2015, peaking at number 15 on the Billboard Heatseakers chart. It was funded entirely through the Kickstarter, and was completed and released in eighteen months. The album was self-produced by MC Lars, with help from Jim Greer of The Rondo Brothers and Damondrick Jack.

The first single from the album was Lars's Game of Thrones tribute "Dragon Blood", which premiered on the Nerdist Industries website on April 6, 2015. "The Ballad of Hans Moleman" premiered on the AV Club on July 21, and "Never Afraid" (featuring fellow Bay Area rapper Watsky) premiered through Scholastic's website on October 27 and "Sublime with Rome (Is Not the same Thing as Sublime)" premiered two days later via Alternative Press. "If I Were a Jedi (That Would be Hella Awesome)" was the sixth and final video from the album, and premiered on the Nerdist on December 22.

== Track listing ==
1. "Where Ya Been Lars? II" (2:05)
2. "Zombie T-Rex" (featuring STZA Crack of Leftöver Crack) (4:03)
3. "Sublime with Rome (Is Not the Same Thing as Sublime)" (featuring Roger Lima of Less Than Jake & Suburban Legends) (2:03)
4. "Hipster Mom" (4:24)
5. "Dragon Blood" (featuring Monte Pittman) (3:00)
6. "If I Were a Jedi (That Would Be Hella Awesome)" (featuring Brian Mazzaferri of I Fight Dragons) (02:02)
7. "Never Afraid" (featuring Watsky & Charlyne Yi) (4:17)
8. "The Top 10 Things to Never Say on a First Date" (featuring Watt White) (1:45)
9. "The Ballad of Hans Moleman" (3:23)
10. "The Dip" (featuring Kool Keith & Monte Pittman) (5:36)
11. "Party with Lars" (featuring Spose) (1:11)
12. "Forgot About Jack" (3:33)
13. "Triforce" (3:30)
