= A Band in Hope =

Studio album by The Matches
- Released: March 18, 2008
- Genre: Art punk; pop punk
- Length: 44:13
- Label: Epitaph
- Producer: Nick Hexum; Mike Green; Miles Hurwitz; John Feldman; John Paulsen; Paul Ruxton; Tim Armstrong

The Matches chronology
| Decomposer (2006) | A Band in Hope (2008) | the Matches album 4, unreleased; graphics? title? or not needed? (2009) |

Professional ratings
Review scores
| Source | Rating |
|---|---|
| AbsolutePunk | 91% link |
| AbsolutePunk | 89% link |
| AllMusic | 3/5 stars |
| ThePunkSite | 4.5/5 stars |

A Band in Hope (formerly The Mad Silentist) is the third studio album by The Matches and was released in Australia and Europe on March 15, 2008, and in the US on March 18, 2008. Audio production was handled by Tim Armstrong, Mike Green, John Feldmann, Nick Hexum, Miles Hurwitz, John Paulsen and Paul Ruxton.

Like their previous album Decomposer, A Band in Hope features multiple producers, though fewer this time around. According to frontman Shawn Harris' blog, the album was created in a period of despair due to the record sales of Decomposer. Instead of following up with the sister album titled The Mad Silentist, the band scrapped many of the old songs (only four remain in the final cut) and re-wrote the album. The new album, as Harris states, sways between hope and despair, and the hope one gets when they feel disillusioned and abandoned.

== Release information ==
On March 11, 2008, the Matches released the entire album on their MySpace page, and were featured on the MySpace front page. The next day the video for the first single "Wake the Sun" was released exclusively on Yahoo! Music. The video for "Yankee in a Chip Shop" was supposed to debut on MySpace Music on August 29, 2008. However, due to issues with the London Metropolitan Police that singer/guitarist Shawn Harris detailed in a blog post, including police that Harris were "rent-a-cops" who took the band members' names and had CCTV tapes of the band "running down the middle of the huge roundabout at Piccadilly Circus that was the video's finale", the video was removed shortly after its posting. (The issue was later resolved and the video released.)

== Track listing ==
| No. | Title | Producer | Length |
|---|---|---|---|
| 1. | "AM Tilts" | Nick Hexum | 3:47 |
| 2. | "Their City" | Mike Green | 4:12 |
| 3. | "Wake the Sun" | Miles Hurwitz | 3:38 |
| 4. | "Darkness Rising" | Mike Green | 3:06 |
| 5. | "To Build a Mountain" | Mike Green | 3:15 |
| 6. | "We Are One" | Mike Green | 3:02 |
| 7. | "Point Me Toward the Morning" | John Feldmann | 2:52 |
| 8. | "From 24C" | John Paulsen | 4:25 |
| 9. | "Clouds Crash" | Paul Ruxton | 2:12 |
| 10. | "Between Halloweens" | Mike Green | 3:57 |
| 11. | "If I Were You" | Mike Green | 2:44 |
| 12. | "Future Tense" | Mike Green | 3:09 |
| 13. | "Yankee in a Chip Shop" | Tim Armstrong | 2:16 |
| 14. | "Proctor Rd." | Miles Hurwitz | 1:11 |

Australia/Japan bonus track
| No. | Title | Length |
|---|---|---|
| 15. | "Here's to Love" | 3:00 |

UK / European bonus tracks
| No. | Title | Producer | Length |
|---|---|---|---|
| 15. | "Yankee in a Chip Shop" (P.O.S. Remix) | Tim Armstrong / remix Stefon Leron Alexander (P.O.S.) | 2:15 |
| 16. | "My Doe, Part One" (featuring Simon Neil of Biffy Clyro) | John Paulsen | 3:32 |

== Charts ==
Chart performance for A Band in Hope
| Chart (2008) | Peak position |
|---|---|
| Australian Albums (ARIA) | 99 |
| US Billboard 200 | 179 |
| US Independent Albums (Billboard) | 24 |
