= MC Lars =

American rapper, producer, and educator (born 1982)

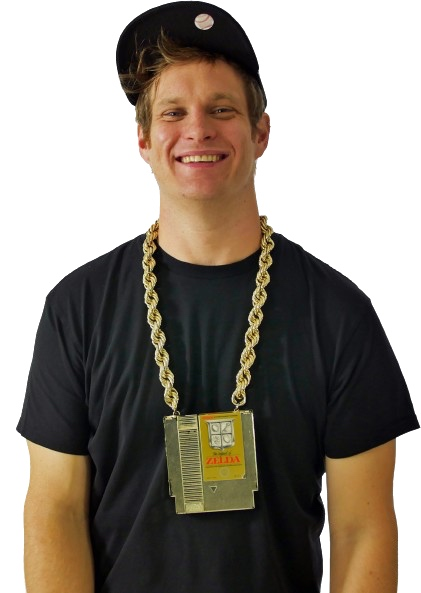
- MC Lars wearing a Legend of Zelda necklace in 2015

Background information
- Also known as: Lars Horris, MC Lars Horris, Lars
- Born: Andrew Robert Nielsen; October 6, 1982 (age 44)
- Origin: Oakland, California, U.S.
- Genre: Nerdcore
- Years active: 1999–present
- Labels: Horris Records, Nettwerk, Truck Records, Oglio Records
- Website: mclars.com

Andrew Robert Nielsen (born October 6, 1982), known professionally as MC Lars, is an American rapper, producer, educator, and founder of Horris Records. A graduate of Stanford University and the University of Oxford, he has been described as a pioneer of "lit-hop", a genre blending hip-hop with themes from classical and American literature. In a 2003 song, he used the term "iGeneration", which ASCAP credited as an early instance of the term. He has performed at venues including Carnegie Hall and multiple TEDx events. His work frequently references authors like William Shakespeare, Edgar Allan Poe, and Herman Melville, and he is considered a key figure in the early nerdcore movement.

== Education ==
Lars attended Stevenson School, a high school in Pebble Beach, California. He later studied English literature at Stanford University and Shakespeare at Oxford University in England, eventually earning a master's degree in instructional design.

== Career ==
Lars has toured and performed alongside a wide range of artists across genres, including mainstream acts such as Snoop Dogg, Nas, Lupe Fiasco, Simple Plan, Gym Class Heroes, T-Pain, and Insane Clown Posse, as well as alternative and nerdcore staples like Say Anything, Bowling for Soup, MC Frontalot, mc chris, and Wheatus.

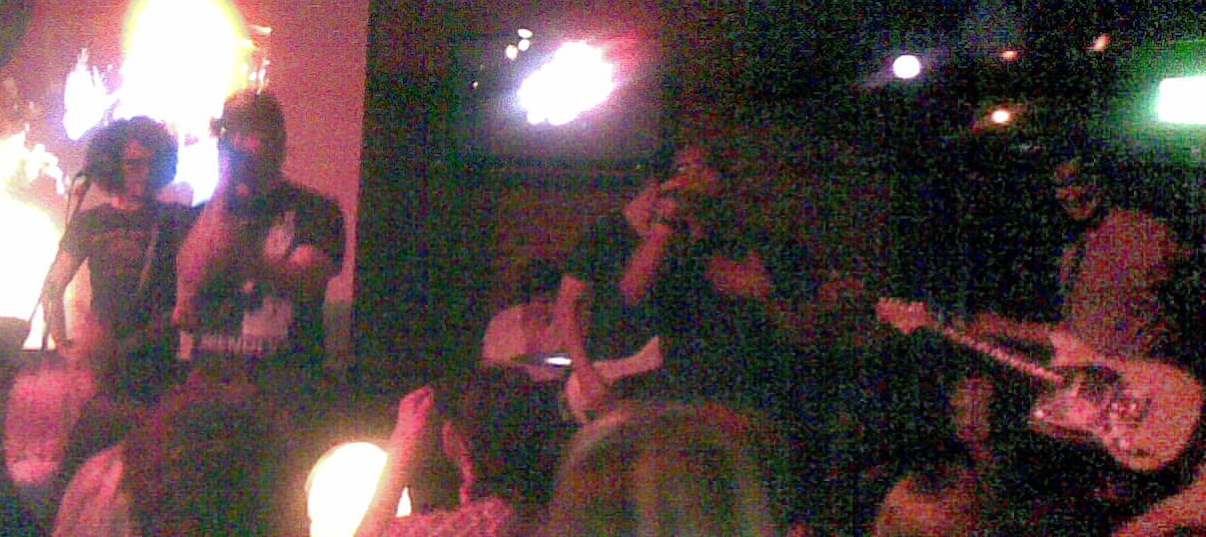
MC Lars performing with Wherewolves at Bang! Nightclub, Melbourne (May 2009)

In 2004, MC Lars released The Laptop EP, establishing his DIY ethos and laying the groundwork for future independent projects. That same year, he founded Horris Records, initially launched as an imprint under Nettwerk and Oglio, before transitioning to full self-distribution.

In 2006, Lars released the single "Download This Song", a critique of the music industry’s response to file-sharing. Issued through Nettwerk as part of The Graduate, the track reached number 29 on the Australian Singles Chart. Shortly after its iTunes release, Lars was contacted by a 15-year-old fan whose family was being sued by the RIAA. Terry McBride, CEO of Nettwerk, and several label artists publicly supported the family’s legal defense, drawing national media attention.

His live shows combine laptop-driven beats with live instrumentation, visual projections, and spoken word, and he has performed solo or with full bands assembled from frequent collaborators. In May 2007, while on the UK’s third Good To Go Tour, Lars was backed by Wheatus, who learned his set and performed it live each night. He and frontman Brendan B. Brown later co-wrote several songs that appeared on This Gigantic Robot Kills.

Later that year, Lars returned to the UK with the pop-punk band Last Letter Read, who opened the shows and then joined him onstage. Throughout the late 2000s and early 2010s, Lars toured with bands such as Bowling for Soup, Simple Plan, and The Matches, often incorporating their members into his set. In 2010, during a European tour supporting Zebrahead, Lars was joined live by drummer Ed Udhus, guitarist Greg Bergdorf, and tour manager Bobby Conner.

In interviews, Lars has spoken positively about the role of digital sharing in growing his audience. In 2007, he released the stems of "White Kids Aren’t Hyphy" under a Creative Commons license via the Jamglue platform, inviting fans to create remixes.

In 2009, Lars partnered with Crappy Records (founded by Bowling for Soup's Jaret Reddick) to release This Gigantic Robot Kills, featuring "Weird Al" Yankovic, Jonathan Coulton, Parry Gripp, MC Frontalot, and Wheatus. Horris Records has also occasionally served as a platform for other up-and-coming artists in the indie and alternative scenes, including K.Flay in 2009 and Weerd Science in 2011. In 2009, Horris released a collaborative EP with K.Flay (Single and Famous), marking an early moment in her career before her signing with Interscope Records after being discovered by Dan Reynolds of Imagine Dragons. In 2011, Lars signed Coheed and Cambria drummer Josh Eppard’s hip-hop project Weerd Science and independently released Lars Attacks!, which featured Weerd Science, as well as KRS-One, Mac Lethal, and Sage Francis.

In 2015, he crowdfunded over $42,000 to produce The Zombie Dinosaur LP, released on Horris Records.

In 2019, to mark the tenth anniversary of This Gigantic Robot Kills, Lars toured the UK again, this time backed by Newcastle-based alt-rock band Ruled by Raptors. The tour featured a fully live setup with instruments and samples, without backing tracks, relying instead on the band to recreate everything instrumentally or with triggers.

== Musical style and influences ==
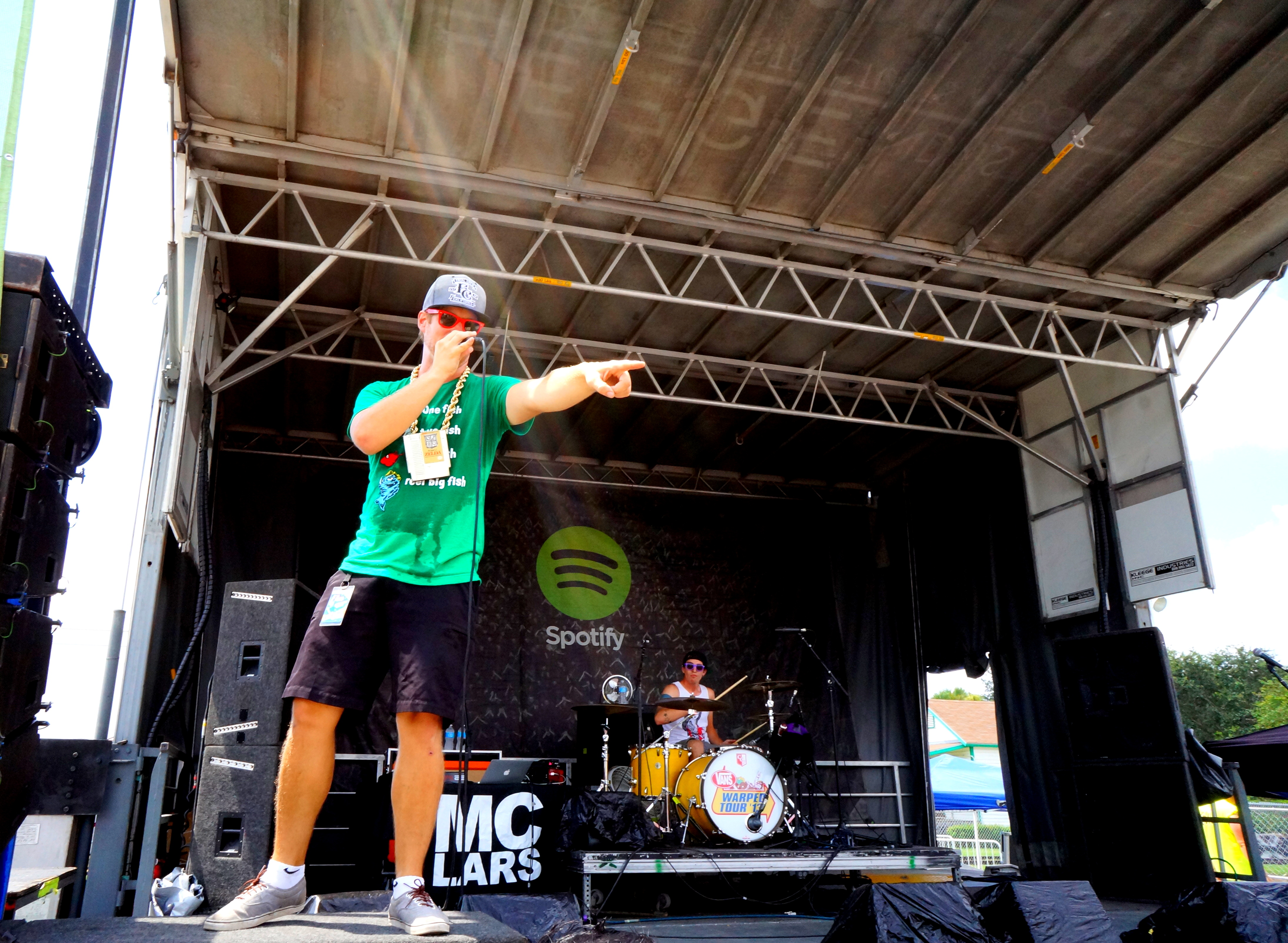
MC Lars at the Vans Warped Tour 2013

MC Lars began his career performing under the names Lars Horris and MC Lars Horris, eventually shortening it to MC Lars. The name "Lars" references a character from the 1995 film Heavyweights, while “Horris” was a cartoon character he created in middle school, inspired by Horace from Dr. Quinn, Medicine Woman. “Horris” later became the namesake of his independent label, Horris Records.

Describing his style as "post-punk laptop rap", Lars blends hip-hop with punk rock, emo, and indie influences. Samples play a central role in his production, drawing from artists like Supergrass, Piebald, Brand New, Fugazi, and Iggy Pop. His track "Signing Emo" notably features a sample from “Cry Tonight” by the fictional band Hearts That Hate, a satirical creation. When Lars toured with Bowling for Soup, the band performed as Hearts That Hate live. A full version of "Cry Tonight" appears as a B-side on the UK release of "Signing Emo".

MC Lars' lyrics frequently reference popular culture. His themes and topics have included the hipster contemporary subculture, iPods, emo music, and literature.

=== Literary themes and education ===
MC Lars’s work integrates hip-hop with academic and literary themes, influenced by his studies in English at Stanford University and Shakespeare at Oxford University. His lyrical content often reflects this foundation, blending satire, literary adaptation, and cultural critique. In 2003, while still a student, he coined the term "iGeneration" to describe those born in the mid-to-late 1980s, a digital-native cohort shaped by file sharing, online identity, and remix culture. He expanded on this concept in the song "iGeneration," which was released for free on Facebook and iTunes in 2006. That same year, his anti-RIAA single "Download This Song" was featured on CBC Radio’s Definitely Not the Opera.

Building on these early explorations of media and identity, Lars became known as a pioneer of "lit-hop," a genre that merges hip-hop with literary themes and canonical texts. Many of his songs are literary adaptations: "Rapbeth" references Macbeth; "Mr. Raven" draws on Edgar Allan Poe’s "The Raven"; "Ahab" retells Moby Dick; and "Hey There Ophelia" reimagines Hamlet.

In 2012, following the release of his Edgar Allan Poe EP, Lars performed "Flow Like Poe" at Carnegie Hall with a live string ensemble during the Scholastic Art & Writing Awards. That same year, at TEDxUSC, he linked the death of Tupac Shakur to the final act of Hamlet and performed the witches’ chant from Macbeth as a rap. He later gave a similar talk at TEDxYouth@Homer in Alaska.

Lars has continued to advocate for hip-hop as a tool in classrooms and arts education programs, bridging literary tradition with digital-age pedagogy.

== Film and TV work ==
Lars's music has been featured on MTV News, CNN Money, HBO’s Hung, G4’s Attack of the Show! and Ninja Warrior. He created musical bumpers and segments as part of the G4 rebrand in 2008, alongside Del the Funky Homosapien, YTCracker, and MC Frontalot.

He has also contributed music to the soundtracks of various films, including Nerdcore for Life (2008), Little Boxes (2016), Pick It Up! (2019), and Challengers (2024).

== Discography ==
- The Graduate (2006)
- This Gigantic Robot Kills (2009)
- Lars Attacks! (2011)
- The Edgar Allan Poe LP (2012)
- The Zombie Dinosaur LP (2015)
- Blockchain Planet (2021)
- The Edgar Allan Poe LP (2025)
