= Mike Sapone =

American record producer

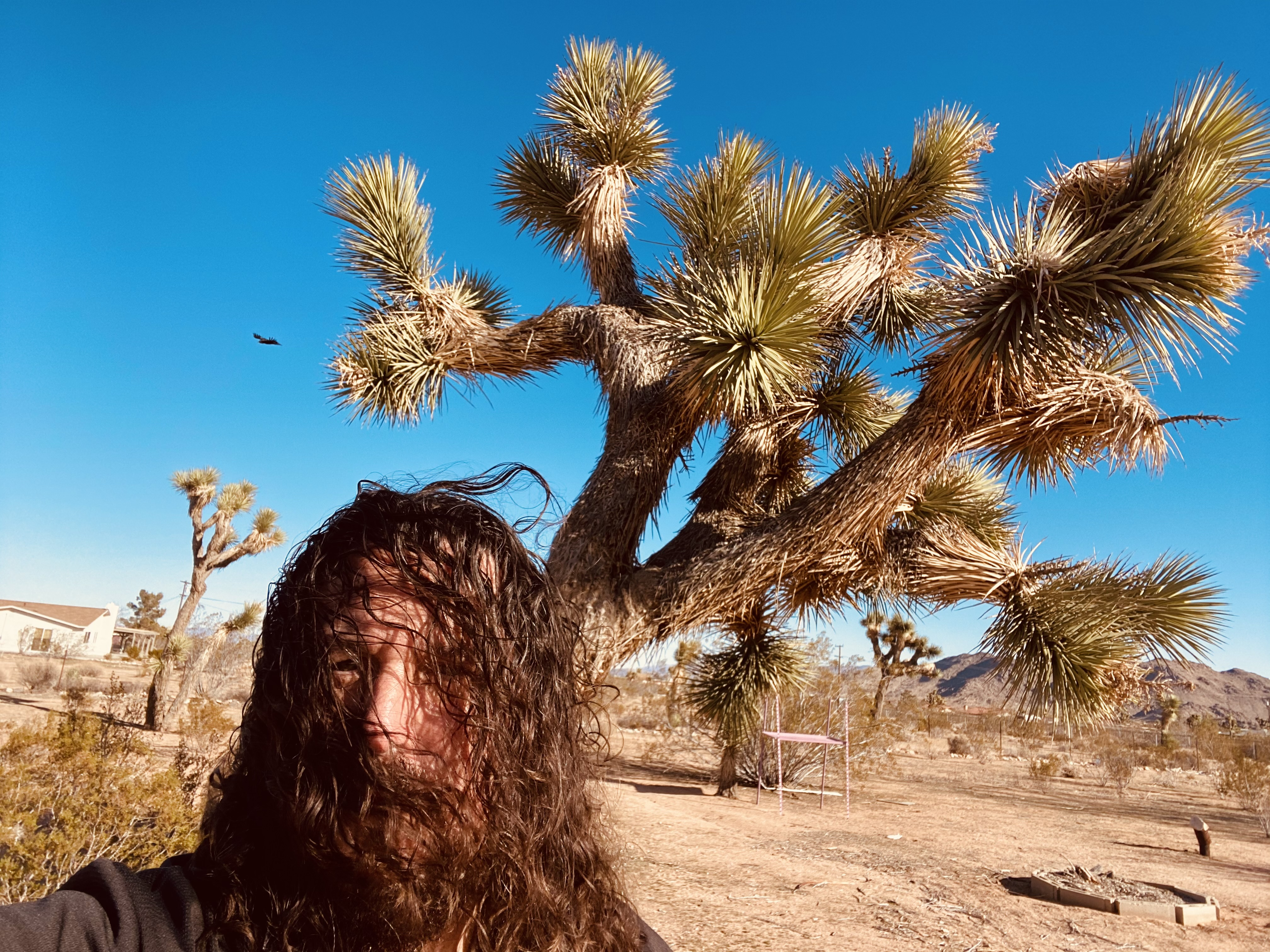
- Sapone in Joshua Tree, California, 2022

Background information
- Origin: New York, U.S.
- Genres: Alternative rock, indie rock, post hardcore, pop punk, post-punk, ambient, electronica
- Occupations: Record producer, mixer, engineer, composer
- Years active: 1994–present
- Website: mikesapone.com

Mike Sapone is an American record producer, composer, audio engineer, and mixer whose credits include producing records for bands such as Brand New, Taking Back Sunday, Boston Manor, The Front Bottoms, Mayday Parade, Grouplove, Anxious, Sincere Engineer, Sorority Noise, An Horse, Oso Oso, O'Brother, Cymbals Eat Guitars, and Public Enemy.

== Timeline ==
- March 2022: Oso Oso's “Sore Thumb” receives Pitchfork’s “Best New Music" honor for the second time in 3 years. Mixed by Mike Sapone.
- October 2021: EA Sports NHL 22 includes Grouplove's "Scratch" off of the band's This is This LP. Mixed by Vince Ratti and Mike Sapone.
- August 2019: Pitchfork awards Oso Oso's Basking in the Glow with its "Best New Music" honor. Produced and Mixed by Mike Sapone.
- 2017: Sapone earns his first No. 1 Album and third top 10 on the Billboard 200 chart with Brand New's Science Fiction.
- 2015: Sapone earns his first No. 1 on Billboard's Top Rock Albums and Alternative Albums chart simultaneously with Mayday Parade's Black Lines.
- Sapone also produced Brand New's critically acclaimed The Devil and God Are Raging Inside Me, which was included in NME's Top 100 Greatest Albums of the Decade and received a 5-star review entitled "America finally gets their own Radiohead" from Alternative Press magazine.

== Discography ==
- Mi Amigo Slow Joy by Slow Joy (2024)
- You Are Who You Hang Out With by The Front Bottoms (2023)
- Fireplace by Sincere Engineer (2023)
- Dancer by Born Without Bones (2022)
- Sunsign by Anxious (2022)
- Where You Been by Anxious (2022)
- Sore Thumb by Oso Oso (2022)
- Theresa by The Front Bottoms (2022)
- This Is This by Grouplove (2021)
- In Sickness & In Flames by The Front Bottoms (2020)
- GLUE by Boston Manor (2020)
- Basking in the Glow by Oso Oso (2019)
- Modern Air by An Horse (2019)
- Welcome To The Neighbourhood by Boston Manor (2018)
- Yarn by McCafferty (2018)
- Science Fiction by Brand New (2017)
- Ritual by Envy on the Coast (2017)
- You're Not As As You Think by Sorority Noise (2017)
- Tidal Wave by Taking Back Sunday (2016)
- Aerobed by Cymbals Eat Guitars (2015)
- Panic Stations by Motion City Soundtrack (2015)
- Black Lines by Mayday Parade (2015)
- Sad Strange Beautiful Dream by John Nolan (2015)
- Happiness Is by Taking Back Sunday (2014)
- Headswell by Sainthood Reps (2013)
- Disillusion by O'Brother (2013)
- Nothing To Be Gained Here by NK (2013)
- Heat Thing by Shone (2013)
- Twelve Years by Daytrader (2012)
- Invicta by Hit the Lights (2012)
- Garden Window by O'Brother (2011)
- Feel You're Different by Lights Resolve (2011)
- Lars Attacks! by MC Lars (2011)
- Monoculture by Sainthood Reps (2011)
- Scatterbrain by The Xcerts (2010)
- The Narrative by The Narrative (2010)
- Lowcountry by Envy on the Coast (2010)
- Punk Goes Classic Rock by Various artists (2010)
- I Was Trying To Describe You To Someone by Crime in Stereo (2010)
- Height by John Nolan (2009)
- Daisy by Brand New (2009)
- Flesh by Robbers (2009)
- New Best Friends by Mansions (2009)
- This Gigantic Robot Kills by MC Lars (2009)
- Selective Wreckage by Crime In Stereo (2008)
- Ultra Hot Volcano by Men, Women & Children (2008)
- The Digital Gangster LP by MC Lars and YTCracker (2008)
- Mansions EP by Mansions (2008)
- (Fork and Knife) by Brand New (2007)
- This is a Landslide by Intramural (2007)
- Crime In Stereo Is Dead by Crime In Stereo (2007)
- The Needles The Space by Straylight Run (2007)
- The Devil and God Are Raging Inside Me by Brand New (2006)
- Men, Women & Children by Men, Women & Children (2006)
- The Troubled Stateside by Crime In Stereo (2006)
- The Graduate by MC Lars (2006)
- Split Cd by I Am the Avalanche (2005)
- Prepare to Be Wrong EP by Straylight Run (2005)
- Elektra The Album Soundtrack by Various Artists (2005)
- Tony Hawk's American Wasteland by Various Artists (2005)
- The Early November/I Am the Avalanche Split EP (2005)
- Nightmare of You by Nightmare of You (2005)
- Spider-Man 2 Soundtrack by Various Artists (2004)
- Straylight Run by Straylight Run (2004)
- The Laptop EP by MC Lars (2004)
- Warped Tour 2004 by Various Artists (2004)
- Where You Want to Be by Taking Back Sunday (2004)
- Deja Entendu by Brand New (2003)
- Warped Tour 2003 by Various Artists (2003)
- Taste The X by Ultra X (2003)
- Revolverlution by Public Enemy (2002)
- MTV Road Rules, Volume I by Various Artists(2002)
- Your Favorite Weapon by Brand New (2001)
- The "Tell All Your Friends" Demo by Taking Back Sunday (2001)
- Lightweight Revolution by The Lightweights (1998)
- Jamaican Bonghits EP by The Lightweights (1997)
- Little Bit Of Life EP by The Lightweights (1996)
- Stuttering John by Stuttering John (1994)

== Productions ==
TV show soundtracks: Lethal Weapon, The Blacklist, Smallville, Sons Of Anarchy, Stargate Universe, Studio 60 on the Sunset Strip, Friday night lights, Access Hollywood, Wife Swap, Girls Behaving Badly, E! True Hollywood Story, and The ESPN ESPY awards.

Video Games: Guitar Hero 5, Burnout Paradise, Burnout Dominator, Tony Hawk's American Wasteland, 2006 FIFA World Cup and NHL 2004.

Sapone has also worked, produced, engineered and mixed for the following artists, among others:

- Bad Books
- Boston Manor
- Brand New
- Crime In Stereo
- Cubic Zirconia
- Daryl Palumbo (Glassjaw)
- David 'Skully' Sullivan Kaplan (Razorlight)
- Denver Dalley (Statistics, Desaparecidos)
- Envy On The Coast
- Every Avenue
- Good Old War
- Intramural
- I Am The Avalanche
- Jaret Reddick (Bowling For Soup)
- Jeff DaRosa (The Exit, Dropkick Murphys)
- John Nolan
- Kevin Devine
- KRS-One
- Lights Resolve
- Mansions
- Matt Morris
- MC Lars
- Men Women & Children
- Mike Kennedy (Vision Of Disorder)
- Moving Mountains
- Nightmare Of You
- O'BROTHER
- Ocean Is Theory
- Public Enemy
- Robbers
- Robyn
- Sainthood Reps
- Silent Majority
- Sincere Engineer
- Straylight Run
- The Dear Hunter
- The Movielife
- The Narrative
- Taking Back Sunday
- The Xcerts
