= The Needles the Space =

Studio album by Straylight Run
- Released: June 19, 2007
- Recorded: August–September 2006
- Studios: Red Wire Audio; Sapone
- Genre: Indie rock
- Length: 45:37
- Label: Universal Republic
- Producer: Straylight Run

Straylight Run chronology
Prepare to Be Wrong (2005)	The Needles the Space (2007)	Un Mas Dos (2008)

Singles from The Needles the Space
- 1. "Soon We'll Be Living in the Future" Released: May 15, 2007; 2. "Still Alone" Released: October 16, 2007

The Needles the Space is the second studio album by American indie rock band Straylight Run. With the release of the Prepare to Be Wrong EP in late 2005, the group completed their contract with independent label Victory Records. Recording for their next album took place at Red Wire Audio and Sapone Studios in August and September 2006 with engineers Bryan Russell and Mike Sapone. By the end of the year, they were shopping the record to potential labels, eventually settling with major label Universal Republic by early 2007.

Prior to the album's release, the band embarked on two US tours (one of which a co-headliner with Sparta); between the two tours, "Soon We'll Be Living in the Future" was released as a single. The Needles the Space was released on June 12 alongside the TNTS Digital EP. Following a stint on the Warped Tour, "Still Alone" was released as a single in October, which coincided with a support slot for the Bravery. The group closed out the year with a headlining US tour, then announced they had been dropped from their label.

Straylight Run expanded their musical palette by incorporating acoustic instruments, strings and marching drums, among others. The Needles the Space charted at number 72 on the Billboard 200, and number 24 on the Billboard Top Rock Albums component chart.

== Background and production ==
Straylight Run released their self-titled debut album through independent label Victory Records in October 2004. Though it only reached number 100 on the Billboard 200, it would go on to sell over 225,000 copies by late 2005. In April 2005, guitarist John Nolan revealed that the band had been working on new material prior to the release of the self-titled. By this point, they had 10–11 songs, some unfinished, that would serve as basic ideas for new tracks when the band get together and work on them. The group released the Prepare to Be Wrong EP in October that year, completing their contract with Victory in the process.

In July 2006, the band begun work on their next album, self-producing the sessions. Recording began in early August 2006 at Red Wire Audio with recording help from Bryan Russell. Raw drum sounds were tracked in a number of different rooms in an old office building, which was owned by Russell's father. They spent two weeks here, until being found out by people who wanted to sublease the property. Partway through September 2006, the band moved to another studio, namely Sapone Studios, where they were assisted by Mike Sapone. At this facility, they tracked guitars, piano, vocals and clarinet. The group documented the recording process with video footage across their YouTube and Myspace profiles, and photos through their Flickr account. Recording concluded by late September; Nolan and Russell mixed the recordings at Red Wire Audio. Shep Goodman and Kenny Giooia mixed the first ten tracks at General Studios, before George Marino mastered them at Sterling Sound.

== Composition ==
=== Overview ===
With The Needles the Space, the band moved towards a more pop-oriented sound, incorporating acoustic instruments, pop melodies, a horn section, strings, marching drums, toy pianos, choirs and handclaps. Drummer Will Noon said the samples and loops displayed a Radiohead vibe to them. Musically, it has been classed as indie rock, drawing comparisons to Belle and Sebastian, the Decemberists, Arcade Fire and Rainer Maria. According to Nolan, the group intentionally wanted a more diverse range of songs, but also wanted it to sound like a cohesive album. They planned to include things in every song that would "kind of tie things together", resulting in more acoustic guitar throughout the album, as opposed to being centred on the piano or electric guitar.

All of the songs were written by Straylight Run except for "Still Alone" and "The First of the Century", which were written by Straylight Run and Isaac Burker. Nolan's sister Michelle DaRosa had more of a writing role, almost on par with Nolan, and had more vocals throughout the album. The band wrote about what the purpose and meaning of everything is. Nolan said the topic is handled "not [in] a direct way. I think it just kinda comes out in a way that we wouldn’t be able to talk about normally in conversation, or even in a thought process." He added that personal problems seem insignificant when put against things in their country and the world. He found that there was only so much he could write about himself before it felt inconsequential.

=== Tracks ===
The opening track, "The Words We Say", features a steady drum pattern and dazed vibe with Nolan and DaRosa harmonizing throughout it, before leading into "The Miracle That Never Came", the first DaRosa-led song on the album. Her vocals are accompanied by horns and the glockenspiel. "Soon We'll Be Living in the Future" serves as a bridge between the group's old and new material, as it retains the energy and emotion of their past work and places it within a bigger sound. Discussing the track, Nolan said he was brought up to be a born again Christian, which took him on a path "through life with an attitude of trying to be open to things and to be thoughtful about things and not get caught up in trends or the ideas of people you're surrounded by". "How Do I Fix My Head" displays the band's the range of their instrumentation: guitar picking, electronic sounds, Noon's constant drumming, coalescing during the song's final minute and a half.

Discussing "Who Will Save Us Now", Noon said regardless if a person listens to a political or religious figure, they would need to find a balance in how they view life and how they find answers from within themselves. "Take It to Manhattan" incorporates hand claps and group vocals; "Still Alone" has been compared to the Format's "Dog Problems". "Buttoned Down" comes across as a basic folk track, displaying Malon and DaRosa's harmonies. "Track #12" sees the group use a tribal drummer, more electronic sounds, and DaRosa wailing in the background. The closing track, "The First of the Century", begins with a faintly played guitar part and Nolan's melancholic vocals. It shifts into Nolan yelling the lyrics, backed by drums until its end.

Bill Joahn arranged and performed marching percussion on "How Do I Fix My Head", "Take It to Manhattan" and "Track #12". Adam Morgan contributed clarinet to "The Miracle That Never Came", "Still Alone" and "We'll Never Leave Again". Tim Brennan of the Dropkick Murphys performed mandolin on "How Do I Fix My Head" and accordion on "The Words We Say". Chris Valentino and Sean McCabe of the Arrogant Sons of Bitches contributed baritone/tenor saxophone and trombone respectively to "Take It to Manhattan", "Still Alone" and "We'll Never Leave Again". Jeff Wissert played trumpet on "The Miracle That Never Came", "Take It to Manhattan", "Still Alone" and "We'll Never Leave Again". Burker added guitar to "The First of the Century".

== Release ==
In October 2006, the band were shopping the album, which was titled The Miracle That Never Came at the time, to potential record labels. Towards the end of the month, "The Miracle That Never Came" premiered through Spin's website. The band went on a US tour in November and December, with support from Matt Pond PA, Kevin Devine and Street to Nowhere. During the tour, the group debuted new material. On February 26, 2007, it was announced that the band would sign with Universal Republic. Nolan said that with signing to them, the band attempted to distance themselves from the punk rock/emo music scene that Victory Records and Taking Back Sunday (which Nolan and bassist Shaun Cooper were former members of) were associated with. He added that Victory might not have had the experience in reaching people outside of that scene. Though signing with Universal Republic also brought its own problem: "We definitely didn't make an album that sounds like a major label album." Nolan explained that even though the album doesn't sound like an album one might expect from a major, he figured that getting a major supporting it would likely be a good thing. Universal Republic were passionate about releasing the album, despite realising it was a "different kind of record." A couple of weeks later, their second album The Needles the Space, was announced for release in June. In March, the band went on tour with the Hush Sound, Spitalfield and Pablo.

"Soon We'll Be Living in the Future" was released to radio on May 15. In May and June, the band went on a co-headlining tour with Sparta, with support from Lovedrug. The Needles the Space was made available for streaming on June 12, and was released a week later through Universal Republic alongside the TNTS Digital EP which included new tracks "I'd Be Lying" and "Waiting on the Weekend". The enhanced CD version of the album included music videos for "How Do I Fix My Head" and "Buttoned Down". The Best Buy edition included two bonus tracks: "I Know It Hasn't Been Easy" and "I Don't Have the Time". From mid-July to early August, the band went on the Warped Tour. "Still Alone" was released to radio on October 16. From late October to mid-November, the group supported the Bravery on their US tour. This was followed by a headlining US tour, from mid-November to mid-December, with support from the Color Fred, Dear and the Headlights and Cassino. On December 9, it was announced that the band were dropped from their label. Cooper explained that they "did everything in our power to avoid the horrible situation we were put into, but I guess that wasn't enough." From late January to early March 2008, the band supported Bayside on their tour of the US. In April and May, the band went on the Get a Life Tour alongside the Used, Army of Me and the Street Drum Corps, which included a performance at The Bamboozle festival.

== Reception ==
Professional ratings
Review scores
Source	Rating
AbsolutePunk	88%
AllMusic	3/5 stars
The A.V. Club	C+
Melodic	1.5/5 stars
PopMatters	6/10 stars
Punknews.org	2.5/5 stars
Spin	4/5 stars

The Needles the Space was met with generally favourable reviews from music critics. Exclaim!'s Sari Delmar wrote that the band "craft poppy rock dripping with originality, yet comfortably so", and were "successful because of their ability to try new things and make them work".AbsolutePunk staff member Drew Beringer praised the band for "experiment[ing] and div[ing] into using different instruments to create a fuller, richer sound than ever before". He went on to say that seeing "the growth in their songwriting and composition is remarkable". Jill Menze of Billboard also found the songwriting to have "grown more complex", despite the lyrics comomg across as "just juvenile self-examination". The A.V. Club writer Kyle Ryan said the band were more focused with this album compared their previous work, though the hooks are largely "eschewed for atmosphere, and the generally subdued tracks cohere nicely, albeit dully".

Trevor Kelley of Spin said previously they "struggled to find a balance between co-songwriter John Nolan’s dramatic piano pop and his sister Michelle’s sultry balladeering. Here, however, the siblings gel perfectly". PopMatters writer Colin McGuire said the album was "filled with more confusion and instruments than one probably ever wanted". He went on to say that they made "somewhat of a successful music career off of morphing into whatever they feel at the time, this is the first instance that it doesn’t quite work". Punknews.org staff member Tyler Barrett wrote that barring a few songs, the "biggest drawback here is how unmemorable the album is as a whole". He acknowledged the "much more rich and layered" songwriting, but felt they "completely swapped out the energy necessary to bring their songs fully to life".

AllMusic reviewer Andy Whitman noted the increased presence of DaRosa's vocals, and said that while her voice works on some songs, it was "no match for the dynamics and passion needed for the adolescent soap operas" of "How Do I Fix My Head" and "This Is the End". He added that "too often these songs take on the histrionic qualities that doom Dashboard Confessional albums and high school diaries alike" as some of them were weighed down by the "lyrical and musical bombast, the hyperventilating choruses vying with the swelling guitars". The Morning Call contributor Kelly Federico also highlighted the wider inclusion of DaRosa's "breathy, child-like vocals play a bigger role. Yet she doesn't have the chops to partner well with John's bombastic voice and lyrics". She said that lyrics far too "often misses the mark with a naive, simplistic tone. The[y] can be maudlin and sound like poetry on a refrigerator magnet". Kaj Roth of Melodic was much harsher, calling the album a "major disappointment in every category," stating that it was a "boring affair of indie rock", dismissing DaRosa's role outright.

The Needles the Space debuted at number 72 on the Billboard 200 chart. Additionally, it reached number 24 on the Top Rock Albums chart.

== Track listing ==
All songs written by Straylight Run, except "Still Alone" and "The First of the Century" by Straylight Run and Isaac Burker.

1. "The Words We Say" – 3:24
2. "The Miracle That Never Came" – 2:33
3. "Soon We'll Be Living in the Future" – 2:54
4. "How Do I Fix My Head" – 4:49
5. "Who Will Save Us Now" – 3:50
6. "Cover Your Eyes" – 3:25
7. "We'll Never Leave Again" – 5:37
8. "Take It to Manhattan" – 2:52
9. "Still Alone" – 2:45
10. "This Is the End" – 3:36
11. "Buttoned Down" – 3:46
12. "Track #12" – 1:16
13. "The First of the Century" – 4:50

Best Buy bonus tracks

14. "I Know It Hasn't Been Easy" – 2:31
15. "I Don't Have the Time" – 4:22

iTunes bonus tracks

14. "I'd Be Lying" – 2:00
15. "Waiting on the Weekend" – 2:25
16. "Soon We'll Be Living in the Future" (acoustic) – 3:00
17. "This Is the End" (acoustic) – 3:39
18. "The Words We Say" (acoustic) – 3:28

== Personnel ==
Personnel per booklet.

Straylight Run

- John Nolan – vocals, guitar, piano
- Michelle DaRosa – vocals, guitar, piano
- Shaun Cooper – bass
- Will Noon – drums

Additional musicians

- Bill Jahn – marching percussion arrangement and performance (tracks 4, 8 and 12)
- Adam Morgan – clarinet (tracks 2, 7 and 9)
- Tim Brennan – mandolin (track 4), accordion (track 1)
- Sean McCabe – trombone (tracks 7–9)
- Chris Valentino – baritone (tracks 7–9), tenor (tracks 7–9)
- Jeff Wissert – trumpet (tracks 2 and 7–9)
- Isaac Burker – guitar (track 13)

Production

- Straylight Run – producer
- Bryan Russell – recording, mixing
- Mike Sapone – recording
- John Nolan – mixing
- Shep Goodman – mixing
- Kenny Gioia – mixing
- George Marino – mastering
- P.J. de Villiers – layout, artwork

== Charts ==
Chart performance for The Needles the Space
Charts (2007)	Peak position
US Billboard 200	72
US Top Rock Albums (Billboard)	24
