= Silent Majority (disambiguation) =

The silent majority, a term made famous by Richard Nixon, is an unspecified majority of people in a demographic who are perceived as not expressing their opinions publicly.

Silent Majority may also refer to:

- Silent Majority (hip hop group), a Swiss hip hop group
- Silent Majority (comics), a DC Comics character
- "Silent Majority" (song), song by Keyakizaka46, now known as Sakurazaka46
- Silent Majority (Terry Allen's Greatest Missed Hits), an album by Terry Allen
- Silent Majority Group, a record label
- "Silent Majority", a song by Nickelback from the album Feed the Machine, 2017
- Silent Majority (horse), Canadian Horse Racing Hall of Fame Standardbred racehorse
