= Taking Back Sunday (album) =

Studio album by Taking Back Sunday
- Released: June 28, 2011
- Recorded: October 2010 – January 2011
- Studios: Barefoot Recording, Hollywood, California
- Genres: Pop-punk; alternative rock
- Length: 39:24
- Labels: Sire, Warner Bros.
- Producer: Eric Valentine

Taking Back Sunday chronology
New Again (2009)	Taking Back Sunday (2011)	Happiness Is (2014)

Singles from Taking Back Sunday
- 1. "Faith (When I Let You Down)" Released: May 3, 2011; 2. "This Is All Now" Released: June 1, 2011; 3. "You Got Me" Released: August 26, 2011

Taking Back Sunday is the fifth studio album by American rock band Taking Back Sunday. After returning home from touring the Soundwave festival in February and March 2010, guitarist Matthew Fazzi and bassist Matthew Rubano were dismissed from the group. They were replaced by guitarist John Nolan and bassist Shaun Cooper, both of whom were former members of the band. Later in March, the band began writing material for their next album in El Paso, Texas. The following month, demos were recorded with the aim to release a new album later in the year. Recording began in October with producer Eric Valentine at Barefoot Recording in Hollywood, California and finished in January 2011.

In March 2011, Taking Back Sunday was announced for release, and a month later, a music video of "El Paso" was released. In May, "Faith (When I Let You Down)" was released as a single, along with its music video. In June, "This Is All Now" was released as a single, and on June 28, Taking Back Sunday was released through Warner Bros. and Sire Records. The band embarked on a tour of the US with Thursday in June and July. In July, a music video was released for "Faith (When I Let You Down)" featuring footage of the band recording and performing at The Bamboozle festival, followed by the release of the single "You Got Me" in August. A US fall tour was undertaken in October and November, followed by a music video for "You Got Me" in the latter month. In March 2012, a music video was released for "This Is All Now". The band then had a headline spot on the 2012 edition of Warped Tour between June and August.

Taking Back Sunday sold 27,000 copies in its first week of release, charting at number 17 on the Billboard 200 chart. In addition, the album reached the top 20 on several other Billboard charts. The album also charted in the lower regions of the Australian, Canadian and UK album charts. The album received generally favorable reviews, with several reviewers making favorable comparisons to the band's debut album, Tell All Your Friends (2002).

== Background ==
In February and March 2010, Taking Back Sunday participated in the Australian festival Soundwave. Soon after returning home, bassist Matthew Rubano sent the rest of the band song ideas, which were ignored. After two weeks with no communication, three members of the band and their manager held a conference call with Rubano. During the call, the band stated their intention of continuing without him. Guitarist Matthew Fazzi also received a call from the group, saying that they were "letting [him] go." On March 29, statements by Fazzi and Rubano announcing their departure from the group were posted on the band's website. Two days later, it was announced that former members guitarist John Nolan, and bassist Shaun Cooper had re-joined the band. Nolan and Cooper had left the band in 2003, going on to form Straylight Run.

The idea of reuniting with Nolan and Cooper was first proposed in January 2010, when Mark O'Connell suggested Lazzara talk with Nolan on the phone. Lazzara said: "One day he [O'Connell] called me and was like, 'Hey, man, what do you think about us going back to our original lineup?' And I was like, 'Are you crazy? I haven't talked to John [Nolan] in, like, seven years. I don't know if he'd want to do it.'" O'Connell continued to insist on the idea, "and then I got a call from John [Nolan] ... it felt like no time had passed ... like we had just talked a few days ago". The pair did not discuss creating music initially, instead "[we got] reacquainted with what had been going on in our lives. Because for me, I genuinely missed his friendship, and same with Shaun [Cooper]."

== Composition ==
As the discussions between Lazzara and Nolan continued, they began sending each other music. At first, the pair thought it would not work out. Eventually, it got to the point where "we were like, 'Oh, man, I think this could work'", according to Lazzara. In March, the group relocated to a farm close to the Texas–Mexico border. The group spent a few weeks writing material at Sonic Ranch studio in El Paso, Texas. The song writing process started off with a guitar part, Nolan and Lazzara would work on lyrics and melodies, and then bounce ideas off the other members. Lazzara would suggest bass parts, and drummer Mark O'Connell would contribute guitar parts. The first song the group wrote was "Best Places to Be a Mom", which was written in 20 minutes. The group wrote seven songs, which would've "typically take[n] Taking Back Sunday six months to do[, instead] we did [it] in a week". Cooper noted that all the members had "gotten better at playing and writing songs".

Cooper said the band members relied "on each other instead of forcing each other to play something". Guitarist Eddie Reyes insisted on playing his own part, as opposed to a chord progression, on several occasions. Cooper said "So instead of trying to force him to play one thing, he’ll go and do his own thing that’s way more cool and unique that any of us could imagine." Lazzara mentioned there was "an urgency and an energy and an excitement" embedded into the material, which "you can't create or fake". Nolan stated that Straylight Run helped Cooper and himself as musicians: "We learned, we grew and were much more mature coming back to TBS." Cooper mentioned that towards the end of the writing process the group's "creative juices ... were just so depleted".

== Recording ==
In April, the band began demoing material, and said they were aiming to release a new album later in the year. In August, the band announced they would be recording in a few weeks' time, and were aiming for a spring 2011 release. After some shows in the summer, the band began recording in October. Eric Valentine produced the sessions at Barefoot Recording in Hollywood, California. Valentine also engineered the sessions with assistance from Cian Riordan. The band used Undertone Audio Consoles during recording. At the start of recording, the group had 18 songs. They whittled this number down little by little, and wrote additional songs at Robert Lang Studios in Seattle, Washington. Nolan said recording the album was a "learning process" since "the way that the band had been making records was very different than what Shaun and I were used to coming back into it". Nolan said their label was "pretty nervous and unsure about what was going to happen". In addition to this, the label would hear their progress throughout the recording process and would infrequently provide feedback. Towards the end of their relationship with the label, said "it was a whole new staff and I don’t think anyone cared anymore". Looking back in 2015, Nolan said the group "ended up not feeling very good" about having their label check on the proceedings.

The drums tracks were completed in early October 2010. Valentine helped the group arrange their parts, according to Nolan: "He has this way of weaving those parts together in a way that we wouldn't have been able to do on our own." Nolan said Valentine took control of "the amp stuff," which made sense to him "because he knows so much more about that stuff". The group spent some time "messing around" with guitar pedals, according to Nolan. On December 8, the band posted a behind-the-scenes video of themselves in the studio. On January 10, 2011, the band announced that recording was officially completed. A week later, the band said the album's artwork was being produced and Valentine was mixing the tracks. While 11 tracks ended up on the final version of the album, a further seven or eight songs were recorded. (Note: In 2014, Cooper revealed that Warner Bros. wanted the group to re-record Tell All Your Friends during the album's sessions, to which Cooper replied: "Are you nuts?") Howie Weinberg mastered the recordings at Howie Weinberg Mastering in March.

== Music and lyrics ==
The new album is a return to the enthusiasm, creative openness and honesty that spawned our first one. We didn't set out to recreate the sound of Tell All Your Friends, but we did set out to reconnect with the excitement and energy we felt making it.

— John Nolan, upon being ask if fans should expect a continuation of their debut album Tell All Your Friends, 2011

Choosing to self-title the album, Lazzara said: "We haven’t had [a self-titled album], and going back to the original lineup, it seems appropriate." Nolan mentioned a recurring theme throughout the album: "The issue of being an adult with a real life and a long-term relationship or marriage, and trying to make that work." The album's sound has been described as rock and post-hardcore. Band members made up their own sequences for the track listing, then noted the similarities. Lazzara said "...with El Paso ... Why not come out swinging?" The track was one of the first songs written for the album, and Lazzara said it encapsulates "both the mood of the environment we were in down there and the mood we were in about being back together again and writing new music". Lazzara called it "probably the heaviest rock song we've ever written", incorporating influences from Fugazi and Glassjaw, and a Nirvana-like bass part.

Lazzara said "Faith (When I Let You Down)" matches a "huge, punishing" chorus with a soft verse, which comes across as a "roller coaster" to him. Lazzara mentioned that the track took longer to work on compared to the other songs on the album, going through 4 or 5 sets of lyrics. One day, Lazzara was checking his emails and saw the phrase "Best Places to Be a Mom" roll across the news ticker. He thought it was "funny and in context it is". The track started out as a slow song before being sped up by Reyes. Lazzara said the track was "strikingly similar" to "You Know How I Do", the opening track on Tell All Your Friends; the vocal melody is taken from "Rosanna" by Toto. "Sad Savior" feature Nolan playing a 1950s Buddy Holly-esque guitar riff reminding Lazzara that he had missed John Nolan's guitar playing:"...I missed ... John's guitar playing, especially coupled with Eddie [Reyes]'s."

Lazzara said, "Money (Let It Go)" has a James Bond "kind of spy/surf-y vibe" and features a "really cool surf-y solo" by Nolan. It took influence from garage rock, and was compared to My Chemical Romance and the White Stripes. O'Connell created the chord progression for "This Is All Now", while Nolan came up with the melody for the song's chorus. The track's lyrics went through three or four different drafts. Lazzara said it was about the group's relationship with "faith and growing up in and out of the church". The verses were centred around an angular Dismemberment Plan-esque drum pattern. "It Doesn't Feel a Thing Like Falling" featured a guitar riff in the vein of Hundred Reasons. The band referred to the bridge in "Since You're Gone" as the "Beatles bridge" because it was "very unlike us," according to Lazzara. Lazzara described "Call Me in the Morning" a "ballady kind of sentimental tune". When the group recorded the track, they sat in a circle "with this crazy microphone in the middle and we were all playing together". "You Were Right" started as an acoustic song, written by Nolan.

== Release ==
On November 16, 2010, Lazzara posted a demo titled "Best Places to Be a Mom" to his SoundCloud page. "El Paso" was made available for streaming on March 28, 2011. On March 30, AbsolutePunk confirmed that the album would be released in June. The band performed a show at Maxwell's in Hoboken, New Jersey on April 6 where they debuted a new song entitled "Faith (When I Let You Down)". The band revealed the track listing for the album, as well as the album's cover art on April 13. The artwork, designed by Brad Filip, was inspired by a photograph taken by Claudia Meyer. Two days later, "Best Places to Be a Mom" was made available for streaming. On April 22, the band released the music video for "El Paso", directed by Thursday guitarist Steve Pedulla. The video features footage shot during the band's show at Maxwell's. The group played a couple of shows in late April, before their appearance at The Bamboozle festival. "Faith (When I Let You Down)" was made available for streaming on April 29, and was released as a single on May 3 with "El Paso" and an acoustic version of "Great Romances of the 20th Century" as B-sides. A music video was released for the song on May 6, featuring footage of the band recording and performing at The Bamboozle festival. It was released to radio on May 17. In May, the band went on a tour of the UK with support from The Xcerts. Prior to the tour, most of the dates had been postponed until August and September due to scheduling conflicts.

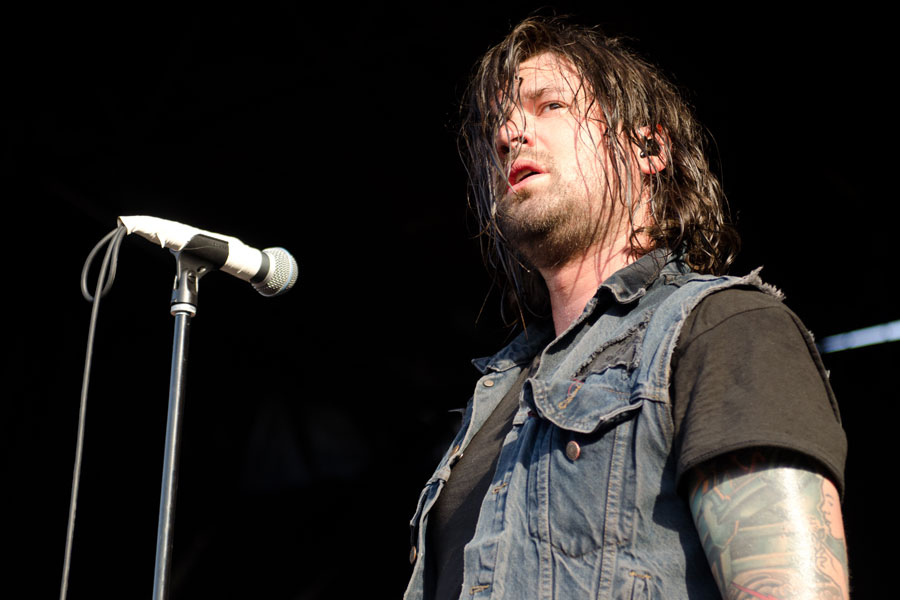
Vocalist Adam Lazzara performing at the Atlanta, GA date of Warped Tour, July 26, 2012

"This Is All Now" was released as a single on June 1 with "Best Places to Be a Mom" and an acoustic version of "Ghost Man on Third" as B-sides. On June 10, a lyric video was released for "This Is All Now". Taking Back Sunday was made available for streaming on June 21, and was released on June 28 through Warner Bros. and Sire Records. The iTunes deluxe edition included a demo of "You Should Have Waited" and acoustic versions of "Great Romances of the 20th Century" and "Ghost Man on Third" as bonus tracks. A limited-edition version of the album included a bonus disc containing six demo recordings. In June and July, the band went on a US tour with Thursday and Colour Revolt, supported by The New Regime. On July 7, another music video was released for "Faith (When I Let You Down)". According to MTV News' Jocelyn Vena, the video is a "social commentary about the fleeting nature of Internet fame, as illustrated by a fake cat trying to make it in Hollywood". It was directed by Chris Marrs Piliero, who said it followed on from his video for Britney Spears' "I Wanna Go". The video was filmed earlier in June.

"You Got Me" was released as a single on August 26 with a live acoustic version of "Sad Savior" as the B-side. The group went on a US fall tour in October and November with support from The Maine and Bad Rabbits. On November 7, a music video was released for "You Got Me". The video begins with the band wondering about Reyes whereabouts, before shifting to Reyes dancing on an empty stage. The idea for it was proposed by the group's tour manager. Cooper said: "Back before we even started touring, we’d go out to clubs on Long Island together and Eddie [Reyes] would be tearing up the dance floor ... [He] is by far the best dancer of the band." On March 21, 2012, a music video was released for "This Is All Now". Directed by Greg Hunter and Josh Romero of Dionysian Entertainment, they had shot the footage during the previous summer and created a music video with it. The group was so impressed they selected it as an official video. In April, the band toured Australia with New Found Glory and This Time Next Year. In May, the group headlined Slam Dunk Festival in the UK. Between June and August, they were one of the headliners of the 2012 edition of Warped Tour.

== Reception ==
Professional ratings
Aggregate scores
Source	Rating
Metacritic	77/100
Review scores
Source	Rating
AllMusic	3.5/5 stars
Big Cheese	3/5
Entertainment Weekly	B+
IGN	8.5/10
Melodic	3.5/5 stars
Newsday	A−
PopMatters	7/10 stars
Punknews.org	4/5 stars
Spin	6/10

=== Critical response ===
Taking Back Sunday received generally favorable reviews, according to review aggregation website Metacritic. AllMusic reviewer Gregory Heaney said Nolan and Cooper's return to the group helped "reinvigorat[e] their sound". He called the record "the sophomore album the band never had". Ian Chaddock of Big Cheese said the vocals weren't "as memorable and far less energetic," compared to the band's debut album. He called the album "decent", containing "a handful of infectious, sing-along songs," but called it "far from the band's best". In a brief review for Entertainment Weekly, Kyle Anderson said Lazzara was "maiming his vocal cords over chaotic guitar crunch," while still sounding "enraptured". Tyler Munro of Exclaim! wrote that the album shared "many of the same dynamics" as the group's debut, specifically mentioning "the energy and layered hooks". Melodic reviewer Pär Winberg called Valentine "a helluva good producer" and praised the production. He also wrote that the group sounded "solid as a rock".

IGN's Chad Grischow said the group charged "full steam ahead with the most rock focused album of their career". He noted the album took the "harder edge of their last album" and moulded it "into something they, and their fans, should be much happier with". In a brief review for Newsday, Glenn Gamboa said it was a "testament" to the group's talent that they can "turn essentially a transition album into something that sounds this good". PopMatters reviewer Kiel Hauck wrote that Lazzara and Nolan's call-and-response vocals, featured on the group's debut, were placed "perfect[ly] throughout the record" as the pair "create a beautiful combination that serves as a reminder of what made this band so special in the first place". Tori Pederson of Punknews.org said the group "sound like a well-oiled machine here," producing "arguably the best album of their career" in the process. Spin's Mikael Wood wrote that the album showcases the group's "crafty songwriting rather than the psychological intensity" that dominated their debut.

=== Commercial performance and retrospective ===
Taking Back Sunday debuted at number 17 on the Billboard 200 chart, with 27,000 copies sold in the first week. The album reached number 3 on the Alternative Albums chart, number 4 on the Top Rock Albums chart, and number 14 on both the Digital Albums and Tastemaker Albums charts. The album also charted at number 49 on the Australian Albums Chart, number 57 on the Canadian Albums Chart and number 87 on the UK Albums Chart. In 2013, Nolan said he was proud of the self-titled album and felt like the group "came out with something that was not completely like any other Taking Back Sunday record". In 2014, Lazzara said he felt like the members were "still feeling each other out because there were all those years between us ... but there were still times where one person wouldn't be as vocal about their ideas". In 2017, Cooper said that making the album was "some of the most fun I’ve ever had", however, he added that it was "a bit of a letdown because people didn’t respond the way we thought. Looking back, I still think that album was very strong". In a retrospective piece for Fuse.tv, writer Jason Lipshutz ranked the album as his fifth favorite Taking Back Sunday album. He said the album sounded like "an acceptance of identity and intrinsic strengths" and that group created "a rollicking return to form".

== Track listing ==
All songs written by Adam Lazzara, Eddie Reyes, John Nolan, Mark O'Connell and Shaun Cooper.

No.	Title	Length
1.	"El Paso"	3:17
2.	"Faith (When I Let You Down)"	3:09
3.	"Best Places to Be a Mom"	3:32
4.	"Sad Savior"	3:19
5.	"Who Are You Anyway?"	3:33
6.	"Money (Let It Go)"	3:08
7.	"This Is All Now"	4:04
8.	"It Doesn't Feel a Thing Like Falling"	3:55
9.	"Since You're Gone"	4:09
10.	"You Got Me"	3:21
11.	"Call Me in the Morning"	3:59

Bonus tracks

iTunes deluxe version bonus tracks
No.	Title	Length
12.	"You Should Have Waited" (old demo/new demo)	2:59
13.	"Great Romances of the 20th Century" (acoustic version 2011)	3:47
14.	"Ghost Man on Third" (acoustic version 2011)	4:03

Limited edition bonus disc
No.	Title	Length
1.	"Mackey Sasser & Steve Balboni Ride Again" (demo)	3:13
2.	"Semi-Automatic" (demo)	3:37
3.	"Morning Sickness" (demo)	5:07
4.	"Not Going Anywhere" (demo)	3:40
5.	"You Should Have Waited" (old demo/new demo)	2:59
6.	"You Were Right" (demo)	3:37
7.	"Adam & John Talk About "Mackey Sasser & Steve Balboni Ride Again""	10:00
8.	"Adam & John Talk About "Semi-Automatic""	9:41
9.	"Adam & John Talk About "Morning Sickness""	8:58
10.	"Adam & John Talk About "Not Going Anywhere""	7:22
11.	"Adam & John Talk About "You Should Have Waited""	6:39
12.	"Adam & John Talk About "You Were Right""	8:15

== Personnel ==
Personnel per booklet.

Taking Back Sunday

- Shaun Cooper – bass guitar
- Adam Lazzara – lead vocals
- John Nolan – lead guitar, keyboards, vocals
- Mark O'Connell – drums, percussion
- Eddie Reyes – rhythm guitar

Production

- Eric Valentine – producer, engineer, mixing
- Cian Riordan – assistant engineer
- Howie Weinberg – mastering
- Brad Filip – art design

== Charts ==
Chart (2011)	Peak position
Australian Albums Chart	49
Canadian Albums Chart	57
UK Albums Chart	87
US Billboard 200	17
US Billboard Alternative Albums	3
US Billboard Digital Albums	14
US Billboard Tastemaker Albums	14
US Billboard Top Rock Albums	4
