= New Again =

Studio album by Taking Back Sunday
- Released: June 2, 2009
- Recorded: September–November 2008
- Studio: Avatar; See Squared; J-Rock, New York City, New York; NRG, North Hollywood, California; The Village, Los Angeles, California
- Genre: Alternative rock; pop rock; pop punk; post-hardcore
- Length: 38:01
- Label: Warner Bros.
- Producer: David Kahne, Matt Squire

Taking Back Sunday chronology
Louder Now (2006)	New Again (2009)	Taking Back Sunday (2011)

Singles from New Again
- 1. "Carpathia" Released: April 18, 2009; 2. "Sink into Me" Released: April 24, 2009; 3. "New Again" Released: July 24, 2009; 4. "Where My Mouth Is" Released: September 1, 2009

New Again is the fourth studio album by American rock band Taking Back Sunday. When guitarist Fred Mascherino left the group after the Projekt Revolution tour ended in September 2007, band members took a break after years of touring. New Again was recorded in October and November 2008 at several studios in New York and California with David Kahne and Matt Squire as producers. Matthew Fazzi of Facing New York joined Taking Back Sunday in early 2008. He was praised by vocalist Adam Lazzara and the group's manager for incorporating new instruments into the group's sound. Guitarist Eddie Reyes called the album "one of the most aggressive records we've ever written". Towards the end of 2008, the group revealed the album's title, went on a US tour, and made "Carpathia" available for streaming.

Following a European tour in April 2009, the title-track was released as a free download. Later in the month, "Carpathia" was released as a Record Store Day release, and "Sink into Me" was released as a single. After "Everything Must Go" was made available for streaming, the band toured the US in May and June. New Again was released on June 2 through Warner Bros. Records, with several editions of the album featuring bonus tracks and video content. Following the release of the title-track as a single in July, the group had a support slot on Blink-182's North American tour in August and September. The group embarked on a short US tour in October, followed by a co-headlining US tour with The All-American Rejects in November and December. After an appearance at Soundwave festival in Australia in February and March 2010, Fazzi and Rubano left the group; in their place, former members John Nolan and Shaun Cooper returned to the band.

New Again sold 48,000 copies in its first week of release, charting at number 7 on the Billboard 200. It also reached the top 10 on several other Billboard charts. The album also reached the top 40 in Canada and Australia. "Sink into Me" reached the top 40 on the Alternative Songs and Hot Rock Songs charts. New Again received a generally favorable response from critics, who praised the album's sound and Lazzara's vocals despite the latter's own dislike of the record. Subsequently, few songs have rarely made it to the live setlist after the release of the band's fifth studio album, Taking Back Sunday.

== Background ==
In June 2007, vocalist Adam Lazzara said Taking Back Sunday were preparing to write the follow-up album to Louder Now (2006). In July, bassist Matthew Rubano mentioned that the other members of the band were in the process of writing individually in separate locations: Rubano in Manhattan, Lazzara in Texas, guitarist Fred Mascherino in Jersey, drummer Mark O'Connell on Long Island and guitarist Eddie Reyes in Ohio. From late July to early September, the band participated in the 2007 Projekt Revolution tour. During the tour, they brought along a mobile recording studio and demoed material, and continued writing for their next album. Plans to do serious writing, as well as record their next album towards the end of the year, were in place.

However, Mascherino left the band following the end of the tour. He said, "It was getting to the point where I felt I had taken the road as long as I possibly could," and his compositions were "more pop than anyone else [in the band] wanted to go". In October, the group revealed that their next album was "in its very early stages". In December, Rubano said the group was in New York City working on new material, having already written six songs. Prior to demoing, O'Connell had to have back surgery, having injured it during the Projekt Revolution tour. During the demoing process, the group tried different drummers, but according to Rubano: "They just weren't Mark. Not enough ferocity, intensity." Following this, the band's members took time to refocus themselves after several years of constant touring. Lazzara sorted his life out following addiction issues, ending his engagement to Chauntelle DuPree of Eisley. He subsequently moved to another town, got married, and had a child. O'Connell also got married, Reyes spent time with his family, and Rubano recorded music for the TV show Electric Company.

In May 2008, it was announced that guitarist Matthew Fazzi, formerly of Facing New York, had joined the band. Reyes, who had met Fazzi during Facing New York's stint on the 2004 Warped Tour, asked him by text whether he wanted to audition for Taking Back Sunday. In a statement, the group called Fazzi "talented and versed in many musical instruments", mentioning that he would be "bring[ing] his unique talent and style to the mix". Rubano was uneasy with Fazzi initially: "He was this very nice, very talented, ambitious, happy guy, and I was like, 'This guy isn't going to last with us, this guy's the wrong fit.'" Around this time, Fazzi and Rubano visited Lazzara in Texas; accompanied by acoustic guitars and a bass, the trio practiced in Lazzara's living room. Here, the trio wrote "New Again" which helped "catapult the energy for the beginning of writing [New Again] forward," according to Rubano. During an appearance at the Virgin Mobile Festival in August 2008, Spin reported that the band was on the brink of entering a recording studio.

== Production ==
In September 2008, the band began recording a new album aiming to release it in early 2009. They initially wanted Eric Valentine as a producer, but according to Lazzara, "the timing didn't work". David Kahne produced the sessions and engineered the overdubs. He aimed to capture the "power and scope" of the band's live performances. The group worked with Kahne because of Fazzi. According to Lazzara, when the band learned he produced Paul McCartney's Memory Almost Full (2007) album, they said, "let's go work with him". Evil Joe Barresi engineered the tracking, with additional production and engineering performed by Jamie Siegel.

Recording was done at Avatar Studios, with Justin Gerrish, and at See Squared Studios in New York City. The majority of the album was recorded in five days. Additional recording took place at J-Rock Studios in New York City, with Anthony Lenoci. "Sink into Me" was recorded at J-Rock Studios, as well as NRG Studios in North Hollywood, California, and The Village in Los Angeles, California. "Where My Mouth Is" was produced by Matt Squire with engineer Bill Appleberry. It was recorded at NRG Studios, with assistance from Casey Lewis, and at The Village, with help from Jared Nugent. Squire also provided additional production and engineering on "Sink into Me".

On October 24, the band mentioned that they had nearly finishing recording the album and would start the mixing process shortly afterwards. On November 6, the band announced they were "still putting the finshing [sic] touches on the album". The recordings were mixed by Tom Lord-Alge with Fernio Hernandez at South Beach Studios in Miami, Florida. Ted Jensen mastered the recordings at Sterling Sound in New York City. In retrospect, Lazzara called Kahne "a good producer," but didn't think he was "the right fit" for the group. He added that what the group aimed to accomplish was "just different than what he had envisioned both sonically and with all of that stuff". Reyes said he was "pre-warned about working with him and I didn't listen to that. ... It was kind of very blank. I think I put my guitar tracks on and then I flew back home and that was it."

== Music and lyrics ==
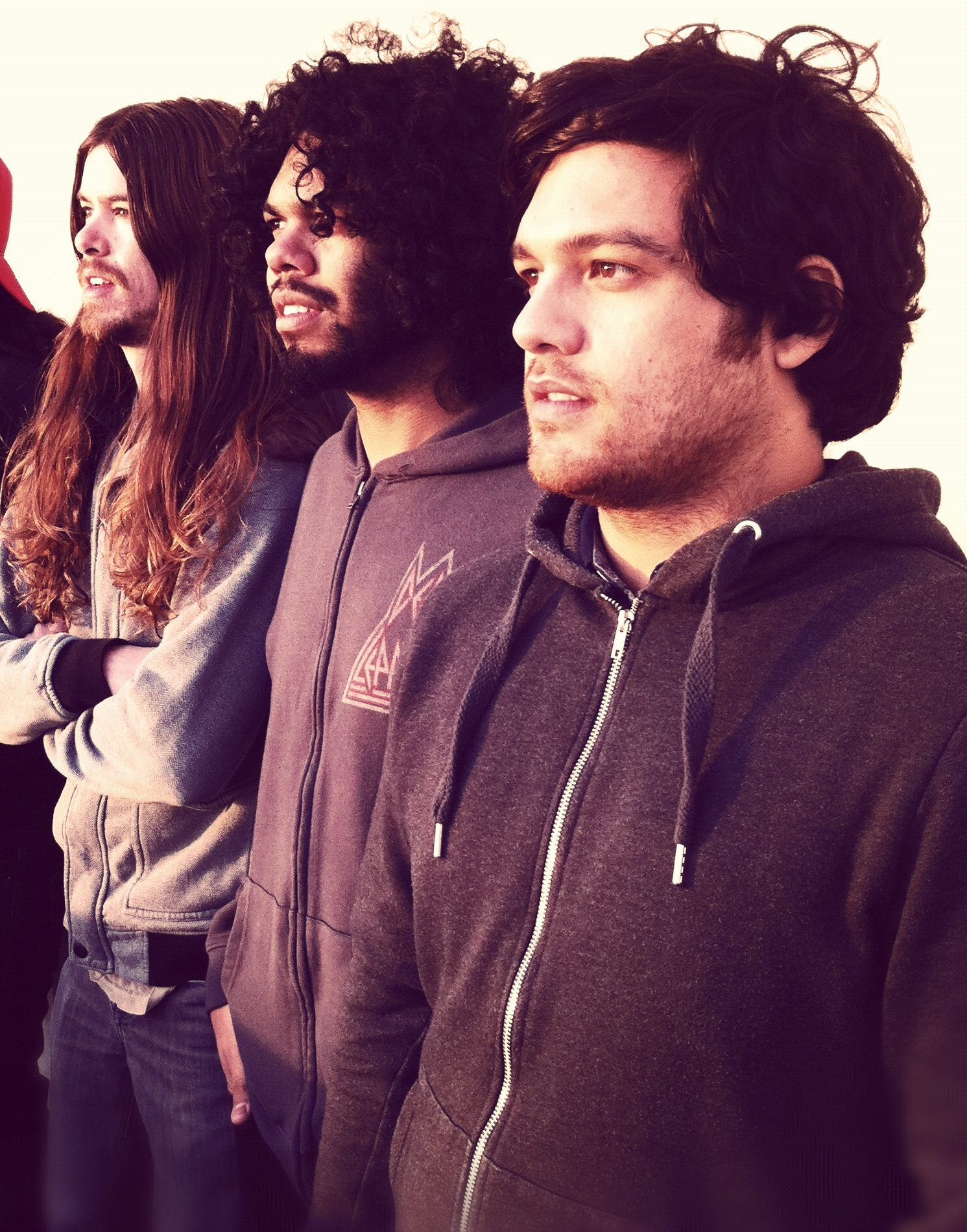
Guitarist Matthew Fazzi (right, pictured with his band Happy Body Slow Brain) has been called a major influence while making the album by both Lazzara and the group's manager.

=== Overview ===
An early title for the album was When All Is Said and Done More Is Said Than Done, suggested by Fazzi. The group liked it, however, Fazzi said it was "way too long to fit on a side of a CD". According to Lazzara, the album was given the title New Again because "that's what it feels like. We are in a totally different band, just because there has been this new life breathed into the band with the addition of Matt[hew Fazzi]." The album was written in Williamsburg, Brooklyn. Here, Rubano said the group "stuck out on the street because we were so loud". For the album, the band embraced the concept that "it's up to us to decide what Taking Back Sunday sounds like. We always want to be redefining what that means, and there's stuff on this record I think in the past we would have stayed away from", according to Rubano. Fazzi said the group wanted to "put a new foot forward ... to show people that we're expanding the music". He noted that the song structures and chord patterns were "just a bit stronger and smarter".

According to Lazzara, Fazzi was a major contributor in writing New Again. The band was, "Experimenting ... [with] a lot of different instruments, horns, glockenspiels, there's a flautist on the record. And it's stuff we never would've tried before." Jillian Newman, the group's manager, also mentioned Fazzi's influence: "[Fazzi] brought a really positive, happy energy to the band. A lot of the walls came down during writing. He allowed everybody to try new things." They were able to do three-part vocal harmonies as Rubano was beginning to sing in the band. With New Again, Lazzara considered his lyrics to be "a lot more forward," compared those on earlier songs. Reyes called the album "one of the most aggressive records we've ever written". The album's sound has been described as alternative rock, pop punk, pop rock and post-hardcore, shifting away from the emo sound of their earlier work.

=== Songs ===
Rubano had a bassline that, within an hour of playing it, became the track "New Again." After writing it, Fazzi said it was a "no-brainer for an opener". O'Connell called it "powerful" and said it "sets the mood" for the album. One day during rehearsals, Fazzi played a guitar riff, then O'Connell played along, resulting in "Sink into Me." The song begins with cheerleader-esque "hey!"s that Fazzi came up with, as well as handclaps. Lazzara referred to it as a "freight train. ... if you were to stand in front of it, you would get pummeled". Lazzara also mentioned that the music to it was "unlike anything we've ever done before. It's real[ly] upbeat." For "Lonely, Lonely," Lazzara said it was the "first time that we just turned it up to ten and went with it". With this song, Fazzi said the group wanted something "short, to the point and just punishing from start to finish". The song's bridge had been suggested by Fazzi during his audition for the band. Rubano said the track was "a freight train of rock & roll" and was inspired by Queens of the Stone Age. "Summer, Man" was one of the first songs written for New Again. It was composed during the Projekt Revolution tour, and consisted originally of a bridge guitar riff by Reyes. Rubano said it was the band's take on a Beach Boys-esque song, and has been compared to a mix of Weezer and Bush with its power pop chorus sections.

O'Connell came up with "Swing," a song that Rubano said "speaks to what the sound of the band is right now". The power ballad "Where My Mouth Is" was the last song recorded for New Again. According to Lazzara, the lyrics were "the most blatant that I've ever been in a song". The demo for the song was originally acoustic with an organ, mostly instrumental, and ran for 6–7 minutes. Fazzi praised the track, as did Rubano. The song subsequently went through various arrangement changes. The riff for "Cut Me Up Jenny" came from Lazzara: "I was so bored and so lazy, I picked up the guitar and then the [mimics intro guitar riff]. That's where it came from and we made a song out of it." Lazzara described it as "a little choppy" with "a nice groove to it". Fazzi said the track has a "crazy 80s vibe, it's a very different song for Taking Back Sunday", while Rubano said it contained hints of Phoenix and Bloc Party. When "Catholic Knees" existed as a rough idea, Fazzi suggested that the group change the time signature to 7/8. Lazzara cited it as an example of Fazzi's influence on the band: "'Cause none of us would have thought to [change the time signature]." Reyes compared the track to Queens of the Stone Age and Foo Fighters; the bridge section recalled Glassjaw.

Rubano came up with the main riff for "Capital M-E," which Lazzara called "too easy" after hearing it for the first time, "like it needs something else". Rubano was adamant, saying "work on it, we'll figure it out". While Reyes compared it to Weezer, Rubano compared it to early Taking Back Sunday, in the sense that "it's a very simple song and about the energy you put behind it". Lyrically, it was inspired by a comment Mascherino made during an interview after leaving the band: "[Taking Back Sunday was] more about cooking food than making music." Lazzara said, "it would probably be the first and last time that I'll go in-depth about that subject". "Carpathia" was named after the ship RMS Carpathia, which was the first ship to hear a distress call from the RMS Titanic. With the lyrics, Lazzara said he tried to be "really obvious with it". The track features a bass solo, which was originally suggested by Fazzi and Lazzara. "Everything Must Go" details the split between Lazzara and DuPree. The title originally appeared as a lyric in an early draft of the song. Lazzara called "Didn't See That Coming" "really slow and almost haunting". He said it was a prequel to "Cut Me Up Jenny."

== Release and promotion ==
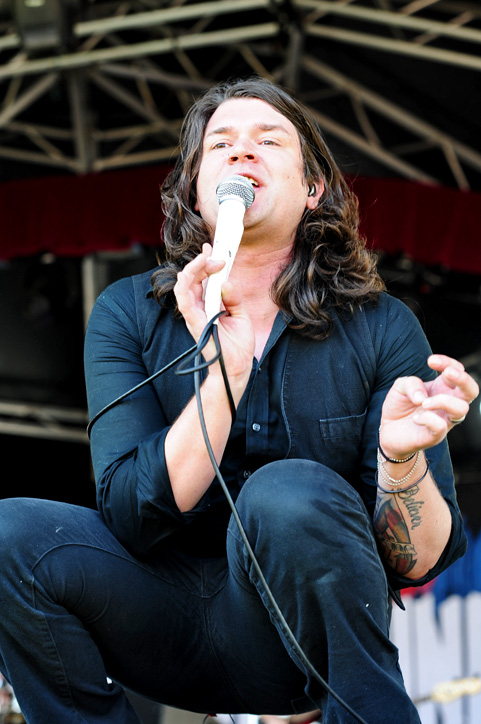
Vocalist Adam Lazzara performing at Soundwave, March 1, 2010

In November 2008, the band revealed the name of their next album: New Again. Later that month, the band performed a few shows with The (International) Noise Conspiracy in the US. In December, the group went on a tour of the US with Envy on the Coast dubbed Hurray Tour!. On every night of the tour, local acts were added to the lineup. In addition, fans could purchase holiday cards on the tour. The cards contained a code that, upon being entered on a website, would allow them to download "Carpathia". On December 21, "Carpathia" was made available for streaming on YouTube. In addition, it was mentioned that New Again was expected to be released in spring. On March 14, the album's artwork was revealed. In addition, fans could hear snippets of new tracks on the group's website. Three days later, New Again was announced for release. On April 8, the band posted a clip of "Sink into Me" online. Following an appearance at Bamboozle Left in April, the band went on a tour of Europe with Underoath, Emery and Innerpartysystem as part of the Give it a Name festival. On April 17, the album's track listing was revealed, and "New Again" was released as a free download. The band released a 7" vinyl single of "Carpathia," with a live version of "Catholic Knees" as the B-side, on April 18 as part of Record Store Day.

On April 19, "Sink into Me" was made available for streaming, and released via the iTunes Store on April 24. "Catholic Knees (26th St. Shakedown)" served as the single's B-side. The music video for "Sink into Me", which had been filmed in New York with director Travis Kopach in early April, premiered on May 13 on MTV. It features the band covered in black goo, a reference to The X-Files' black oil, sinking into a stage. The following day, Rubano revealed that "an entirely acoustic reinterpretation" of New Again was in the works. On May 19, "Everything Must Go" was made available for streaming on the band's Myspace profile. Following an appearance at the Bamboozle Festival, the band toured the US in May and June with Anberlin and Envy on the Coast. With every two tickets purchased for the tour, fans received a digital download copy of New Again. New Again was made available for streaming via the band's Myspace account on May 28, and released on June 2 through major label Warner Bros. Records. People who pre-ordered the limited version of the album received two extra songs: "Didn't See That Coming" and "Catholic Knees (26th St. Shakedown)."

A deluxe edition included a DVD with a making-of feature of the recording process, as well as a track-by-track commentary by the band. The iTunes edition included "Long Time Comin'" and the music video for "Sink into Me" as bonus tracks. In promoting the album, Warner Bros. Senior Vice-President of Marketing Rob Gordon said the promotional campaign would accomplish two objectives: "No. 1 is energizing the fan base. No. 2 is taking this band from the world of ... whatever you want to call it to an arena-rock band," such as the Foo Fighters. To help with the first point, the label worked with Myspace to hold listening sessions aboard the band's tour bus in various cities. The album's release was followed by a European tour in July. "New Again" was released as a single on July 24 with an acoustic version of "Sink into Me" as the B-side. In late July and early August, the band toured the UK with support from Twin Atlantic. In August and September, the band supported Blink-182 on their North American tour and performed at Virgin Mobile FreeFest. "Where My Mouth Is" was released to radio on September 1. In late October, the band went on a brief tour of the US.

In November and December, the band co-headlined a US tour with The All-American Rejects, with support from Anberlin. The Japanese edition of the album was released on December 9 through Warner Music Japan and included "Didn't See That Coming" as a bonus track. In February and March 2010, the band participated in the Soundwave festival in Australia. On this tour, the band performed sideshows with Enter Shikari. After returning home, Rubano sent the rest of the band song ideas, which were ignored: "No responses to like half a dozen songs being sent out. Just, very weird." Following two weeks of no communication with the band, three members of the band and their manager held a conference call with Rubano. During the call, the band stated their intention of continuing without him. Likewise, Fazzi received a call saying that the group were letting him go. On March 29, statements by Fazzi and Rubano announcing their departure from the group were posted on the band's website. Two days later, it was announced that former members guitarist John Nolan and bassist Shaun Cooper had re-joined the band.

== Reception ==
Professional ratings
Aggregate scores
Source	Rating
Metacritic	77/100
Review scores
Source	Rating
AllMusic	3.5/5 stars
Alternative Press	4.5/5 stars
Entertainment Weekly	A−
Melodic	3.5/5 stars
PopMatters	8/10 stars
Rolling Stone	2.5/5 stars
Spin	5/10
Sputnikmusic	5/5 stars

=== Critical response ===
New Again received generally favorable reviews from critics, according to review aggregation website Metacritic. AllMusic reviewer Stephen Thomas Erlewine wrote that, like their peers, Taking Back Sunday "gets increasingly poppy as their career winds on". He mentioned that their sound was "brighter and bigger in every regard". Writing for Alternative Press, Scott Heisel praised the record highly, stating that it "leaps forward as the best album of Taking Back Sunday's career to date". He also mentioned it featured "a darker, more menacing vibe". Jason Lipshutz of Billboard said the group "branch[ed] out from its emo roots," sounding "focused" delving into "complex melodies and thematic ideas". Lipshutz said that Lazzara's growth as a songwriter made the album "a brisk, enjoyable outing".

In a review for Entertainment Weekly, author Andy Greenwald said the group were able to "reinvent themselves as mainstreamo shredders" with New Again. Melodic reviewer Tom Spinelli noted that the "more straight forward ... sound" the group were going for could push them "into a more mainstream audience". He mentioned that while a lot of the songs have "a more radio sound on them," it's not done in a "cheesy way". Jon Pareles of The New York Times mentioned Kahne's production as giving the band "a little more gloss". Pareles noted several homages to U2: the guitar work on "New Again" and "Catholic Knees," the keyboard intro to "Where My Mouth Is," as well as Lazzara's "vocal delivery, full of Bono's breathy gulps and open-throated crescendos".

PopMatters' Matthew Niner praised Lazzara's voice, calling him "an incredibly versatile vocalist". Niner wrote that the group created "another solid album that cements their reputation as one of the most genuinely affecting and consistent bands in the current scene". Christian Hoard of Rolling Stone wrote that while an "arena-ready polish" features throughout the album, it doesn't help the "forced melodrama," in songs such as "Lonely, Lonely". Spin reviewer David Bevan wrote that album "focuses on roaring arenas as much as on two-timing lovers". He said Lazzara's vocals sounded "more sore- than full-throated, but they still freeze blood for short stretches". Channing Freeman of Sputnikmusic wrote that New Again "places less emphasis on catchy parts and [is] more focused on entire songs".

=== Commercial performance and legacy ===
New Again debuted at number seven on the Billboard 200, selling 48,000 copies in its first week in the United States. The album reached number two on the Alternative Albums chart, number five on both the Digital Albums and Top Rock Albums charts and number six on the Tastemaker Albums chart. The album also charted at number 16 on the Canadian Albums Chart, number 31 on the Australian Albums Chart and number 46 on the UK Albums Chart. "Sink into Me" peaked at number 10 on the Alternative Songs chart and number 32 on the Hot Rock Songs chart.

Alternative Press named it album of the year. Fuse.tv's Jason Lipshutz called New Again his least-favorite Taking Back Sunday album. Lipshutz said that there were "moments worth revisiting" on the album, but it was "clearly a transitional outing," attempting to build on the success of Louder Now. In a retrospective piece, Scott Heisel of Alternative Press said Fazzi helped bring "jazz, off-kilter riffs" and "lush textures" to the band, while mentioning the rest of the group provided the "most aggressive songs to date in 'Lonely, Lonely' and 'Swing'."

In 2010, Lazzara answered questions on his Formspring account, commenting that New Again "was a gigantic step backwards" and that he was "not fully satisfied with what we put out". In 2012, Reyes said of New Again: "I didn't like how we had to constantly change producers and the songwriting didn't turn out originally as it was, it just kind of bummed us out a bit." Discussing New Again in 2016, Rubano called the period "the golden time where I was like 'oh, we're doing music, that we all really like, that we can't wait to get out' and things were going pretty good for a little while". However, when the album was released, the "critics seemed to like it, but it didn't really hit [with the public], and then when we started the touring cycle for it there was a very decisive mood turn in a band that already was insanely moody all the time".

The album was released on vinyl in April 2017.

== Track listing ==
All songs written by Taking Back Sunday.

No.	Title	Length
1.	"New Again"	3:33
2.	"Sink into Me"	3:03
3.	"Lonely, Lonely"	2:49
4.	"Summer, Man"	3:51
5.	"Swing"	3:26
6.	"Where My Mouth Is"	3:52
7.	"Cut Me Up Jenny"	3:52
8.	"Catholic Knees"	2:48
9.	"Capital M-E"	2:49
10.	"Carpathia"	3:09
11.	"Everything Must Go"	4:44

Bonus tracks

iTunes pre-order bonus track
No.	Title	Length
12.	"Carpathia" (Dance Dicaprio version)	3:46

iTunes bonus track version
No.	Title	Length
12.	"Long Time Comin'"	2:38
13.	"Sink into Me" (music video)	3:15

Japanese bonus track
No.	Title	Length
12.	"Didn't See That Coming"	3:07

Limited edition pre-order bonus tracks
No.	Title	Length
12.	"Didn't See That Coming"	3:07
13.	"Catholic Knees (26th St. Shakedown)"	3:09

Limited edition DVD
No.	Title	Length
1.	"Behind the Scenes Part 1"	10:12
2.	"Behind the Scenes Part 2"	12:57
3.	"Track by Track"	24:43

B-side
No.	Title	Length
1.	"Winter Passing"	3:29

== Personnel ==
Personnel per sleeve.

Taking Back Sunday

- Matthew Fazzi – lead guitar, keyboards, vocals
- Adam Lazzara – lead vocals
- Mark O'Connell – drums, percussion
- Eddie Reyes – rhythm guitar
- Matthew Rubano – bass guitar, backing vocals

Production

- David Kahne – producer, overdubs engineering
- Evil Joe Barresi – tracking engineering
- Jamie Siegel – additional production, engineering
- Matt Squire – additional production, engineering, producer
- Bill Appleberry – engineering
- Tom Lord-Alge – mixing
- Justin Gerrish – assistant
- Anthony Lenoci – assistant
- Casey Lewis – assistant
- Jared Nugent – assistant
- Femio Hernandez – assistant
- Ted Jensen – mastering
- Brad Filip – art design
- Kurt Iswarienko – band photo

== Chart positions ==
Chart (2009)	Peak position
Australian Albums Chart	31
Canadian Albums Chart	16
Scottish Albums Chart	63
UK Albums Chart	46
US Billboard 200	7
US Billboard Alternative Albums	2
US Billboard Digital Albums	5
US Billboard Tastemaker Albums	6
US Billboard Top Rock Albums	5
