= Cassino (band) =

American folk band

- Origin: Huntsville, Alabama, United States
- Genres: Indie rock; Folk rock
- Years active: 2005–present
- Label: None
- Members: Nick Torres (2005–); Tyler Odom (2005–) et al.
- Website: www.cassinomusic.com

Cassino is a folk band from Huntsville, Alabama, created from the remnants of the band Northstar.

In April 2005, Cassino was birthed from the remnants of the two principal songwriters of the Alabama rock group Northstar – a team that arose through a creative bond between childhood friends Nick Torres and Tyler Odom. They began recording their first album in 2006 with Nashville-based producer–drummer Craig Krampf, known for his work with artists including Dolly Parton, Alabama, Townes Van Zandt, Steve Perry and Melissa Etheridge. While the record does not have a specifically Nashville sound, the city did become prevalent in the making of their debut record Sounds of Salvation, both as a new environment to inspire songwriting, and in the cast of characters brought in by Krampf. "Salvation" was soon joined by E Street Band bassist Garry Tallent and saxophonist Jim Horn. Released independently on March 29, 2007, Sounds of Salvation blends various states and sounds. In September and October 2007, they went on a US tour with the Forecast and Blackpool Lights. Following this, they supported Straylight Run on the headlining tour of the US until the end of the year.

After touring the U.S. in support of the album, Cassino settled down and started working on another full-length record in the beginning of 2008. Odom exited the process (he now plays with the group Destry), and Torres teamed up to write primarily with Alabama native and long-time friend Edward Puckett. Puckett filled in on bass for the earlier Cassino tours, and through constant exposure, they found that their similar tastes and different styles complemented each other well. They set up shop in a small apartment, and wrote and recorded for most of 2008. The city of Nashville this time found its way into the recording process through the contributions of friends and session/touring musicians Kevin Arrowsmith (fiddle, banjo, mandolin), Tripper Ryder (bass) and Craig Krampf (drums, percussion). This newest endeavor became Kingprince. It was released digitally in December 2009, and was released physically in January 2010.

Nick Torres and Ed Puckett have gone back into the studio to record a new album recorded and released in the form of two six-song EPs. The first half of the album was titled Bottlenecker and was scheduled to be released in the Spring of 2016. In early 2020 the band released two singles which would be included in their next EP. On February 28 the band released an eight-song EP titled Yellowhammer. The album included a revised version of the previously released song, "Ghost", as well as a previously recorded song, "Corvette".

On the 11th anniversary of the release of "Kingprince", Cassino released a single titled, "Quarantine Song".

In September 2022, Cassino released a cover of a previously released Northstar song, "Pollyanna", entitled "Pollyanna 22".

== Discography ==
- Sounds of Salvation (March 29, 2007)
- Kingprince (October 28, 2009)
- The Weight of Bother (May 14, 2011)
- Bottlenecker (May 27, 2016)
- Yellowhammer (February 28, 2020)

== Shows ==
Their shows are few and far between, usually touring with As Tall As Lions. They started a US tour, in November 2007, with the band Straylight Run. Also appearing in this tour were Dear And The Headlights, The Color Fred and Clouds Take Shape.
