= Northstar (rock band) =

American band

- Origin: Huntsville, Alabama, U.S.
- Genres: Emo; indie rock; pop punk
- Years active: 1997–2005
- Label: Triple Crown
- Past members: Nick Torres; Tyler Odom; Jake Fisher; Gabe Renfroe; Shawn Regan

Northstar was an American emo band formed in 1997 in Huntsville, Alabama.

== History ==
=== Early years and Is This Thing Loaded? (1997–2003) ===
From the band's inception, they had around five guitarists and three different bassists, and have been a three-piece, four-piece, and five-piece group. Due to a lack of a dedicated music scene in the Huntsville area, the band decided to start touring the country in 2000. They booked their first tour, bought a van, and set out on the road.

After two years of booking, promoting, and independent production. The band signed a deal with Triple Crown Records of New York City in June 2002. By this point, the only original member in the band was drummer Gabe Renfroe. Their line-up solidified with Nick Torres on lead vocals and guitar, Tyler Odom on guitar and Shawn Reagan on bass. The band released their debut album Is This Thing Loaded? on October 22, 2002. Writing in 2022, Andrew Sacher of BrooklynVegan said it influenced the later work of Taking Back Sunday, and "remains one of the best and most underrated albums of the entire early 2000s emo boom". The album was promoted with a few headlining shows in October, before joining the All-American Rejects and Motion City Soundtrack on their tour in November. After this, the band went on tour with Taking Back Sunday and the Starting Line in November and December. In March and April 2003, the band toured across the US with Armor for Sleep, This Day Forward, and Breaking Pangaea, leading up to an appearance at the Skate & Surf Fest. They toured with Senses Fail in May, and contributed the track "To My Better Angel" to the soundtrack of Beer: The Movie. Following this, the band toured the US in June with River City High, and supported Rx Bandits on their tour in July. In September and October, the band supported Rufio and Motion City Soundtrack on a co-headlining cross country tour. They toured for over a year until Jake Fisher replaced Reagan.

=== Pollyanna, break-up, and subsequent events (2004–2008) ===
The group released their second album Pollyanna in April 2004. That same month, the band performed at the Skate and Surf Festival. Following this, they went on tour with Moneen in April and May, before going back on tour again in June with Piebald and the Jealous Sound. The band then appeared on select dates of the 2004 Warped Tour. The band also made a brief visit to the UK with Modest Mouse. In October and November, the band went on tour with Hot Rod Circuit, Say Anything and Straylight Run. Following this, they went on hiatus in December and later re-grouped in February 2005 for a co-headlining tour with Lucero. They were supported by the Honorary Title, Circa Survive and Communiqué. The band then broke up on April 11, citing "personal reasons"; they performed at The Bamboozle festival the following month. A video album The Uncomfortable Camera appeared in June, and included the band's music videos on the release's second disc. Torres and Odom created Cassino; the demos for it were recorded with Matt Squire and used drummer Will Noon of Straylight Run.

A collection of demos and alternate recordings, entitled Broken Parachute, was announced by Nashville-based Speak Music Media in November 2005, initially as a five-track EP. It was then expanded to a nine track full-length and released on January 8, 2008. Cassino later released their debut a few months later.

=== Legacy ===
Dikembe released a cover of the band's track "Two Zero Two" in July 2017.

Former bassist Jake Fisher died in 2017.

== Discography ==
Studio albums

- Is This Thing Loaded? (Triple Crown Records, 2002)
- Pollyanna (Triple Crown Records, 2004)

Compilation albums

- Broken Parachute (Speak Music Media, 2008)

Video albums

- The Uncomfortable Camera (2005) - DVD

Demos

- Hardcore Demo (1997)
- Early Demo 1 (1998)
- Blindcrush Demo (1999)
- There's More Where This Came From Demo (2000)
- Is This Thing Loaded Demo (2001)

== Band members ==
- Jake Fisher (Note: Jacob Paul Fisher; March 27, 1982 – August 28, 2017) – bass (2004–2005)
- Tyler Odom – guitar (2002–2005)
- Shawn Regan – bass (2002–2004)
- Gabe Renfroe – drums (2002–2005)
- Nick Torres – lead vocals and guitar (2002–2005)
