= Prepare to Be Wrong =

EP by Straylight Run
- Released: October 4, 2005
- Recorded: Static Recording Studios (Brooklyn, New York), Sapone Studios (Bethpage, New York), John Nolan's bedroom
- Genre: Indie rock
- Length: 29:24
- Label: Victory
- Producer: Straylight Run, Mike Sapone

Straylight Run chronology
Straylight Run (2004)	Prepare to Be Wrong (2005)	The Needles the Space (2007)

Professional ratings
Review scores
Source	Rating
Melodic	3.5/5 stars

Prepare to Be Wrong is an extended play (EP) by Straylight Run, released on October 4, 2005 by Victory Records. The song "It Never Gets Easier" was originally titled "Costello".

In 2025, Stephen Andrew Galiher of Vice included the album in his list of "4 Underrated Emo Albums From the 2000s That Deserve More Love Today".

== Release ==
"Hands in the Sky (Big Shot)" was released to radio on October 25, 2005. In October and November, the band supported Simple Plan. The band supported Motion City Soundtrack on the mtvU Campus Invasion tour in April 2006. In May, the band toured Australia alongside Matchbook Romance.

== Track listing ==
All songs written by Straylight Run, except where noted

1. "I Don't Want This Anymore" – 3:43
2. "It Never Gets Easier" – 4:09
3. "A Slow Descent" – 5:12
4. "Hands in the Sky (Big Shot)" – 5:42
5. "Later That Year" – 4:16
6. "With God on Our Side" – 6:19 (Bob Dylan)

== Credits ==
- Isaac Burker – guitar
- Shaun Cooper – bass
- Jeff DaRosa – backing vocals
- John Nolan – vocals, guitar, piano
- Michelle Nolan – vocals, guitar, piano
- Will Noon – drums
