= Happiness Is (Taking Back Sunday album) =

Studio album by Taking Back Sunday
- Released: March 18, 2014
- Recorded: June–July, August–October 2013
- Studio: Rancho Recordo, Fenton, Michigan; Sapone Productions, Long Island, New York
- Genre: Alternative rock, pop rock
- Length: 40:58
- Label: Hopeless
- Producer: Marc Jacob Hudson, Mike Sapone

Taking Back Sunday chronology
Taking Back Sunday (2011)	Happiness Is (2014)	Tidal Wave (2016)

Singles from Happiness Is
- 1. "Flicker, Fade" Released: January 14, 2014; 2. "Stood a Chance" Released: March 3, 2014; 3. "Better Homes and Gardens" Released: May 18, 2015

Happiness Is is the sixth studio album by American rock band Taking Back Sunday. Before the release of their self-titled album in mid-2011, the group had started working on its follow-up. Throughout the rest of the year, and 2012, band members mentioned in interviews they had various song ideas and tracked demos with producers Marc Jacob Hudson and Mike Sapone. In early 2013, the group spent two weeks in West Virginia, during which they wrote songs for the new album. Satisfied with how the demos turned out, they decided to bring in Hudson and Sapone to record their new album. In June and July, the band recorded at Rancho Recordo in Fenton, Michigan with Hudson.

In August, the group announced they had signed with independent label Hopeless Records. Following a break, the group continued recording with Sapone at his studio Sapone Productions in New York between August and October. Embarking on a US tour in late 2013, the group debuted two new songs, "Flicker, Fade" and "Beat Up Car". Adam Lazzara left the tour due to the early birth of his son, but later returned. Happiness Is was announced in mid-January 2014, which coincided with the release of "Flicker, Fade" as a single. A music video was released for the track later in the month. "Stood a Chance" was released as a single, as was a music video for the track, in early March.

Preceded by an audio stream, Happiness Is released on March 18 through Hopeless Records. It received generally favorable reviews from critics. Selling 22,000 copies in the first week, the record debuted at number 10 on the Billboard 200 chart. In addition, it also charted within the top five on other Billboard charts, and in Australia and the UK. The band embarked on a co-headlining tour with the Used in the US in April and May, Australia in August, and again in the US in September and October. A music video for "All the Way" was released in mid-November. The group closed the year with a UK/Europe tour with Marmozets and Blitz Kids. The album was reissued in February 2015 digitally and as a 7" vinyl box set with bonus tracks. Between February and April, the band went on a US tour with the Menzingers and Letlive. In May, a music video for "Better Homes and Gardens" was released, and the group performed at the Slam Dunk Festival in the UK.

== Background ==
Prior to the release of Taking Back Sunday in June 2011, the band had begun work on their sixth album. While on tour to support the self-titled album, the group were constantly working on new material. Vocalist Adam Lazzara said, "This is where everybody's head is at; it's not like, 'Oh, we're getting back together and doing a reunion record.' ... We're definitely moving forward and into the future." He added that a few outtakes from the self-titled sessions could be "stepping stones towards our future record ... [A few] ideas we were kicking around that never really got the attention they needed." In November, Alternative Press reported that the band were writing new music. The following month, bassist Shaun Cooper said the group had dedicated three days solely to writing material, adding that they "mess[ed] around with different time signatures."

In a February 2012 interview with Ultimate Guitar Archive, guitarist Eddie Reyes claimed they had "a lot of music", but added that they "tend to change things along the way"; he was optimistic about it appearing on their next album. He mentioned they had written "some ideas", and they were "putting them aside" and working on them when time permitted. He also said the group was aiming to record their next album in 2013. In March 2012, it was reported that the band had demoed material at a studio in Michigan with Marc Jacob Hudson. In May, drummer Mark O'Connell posted that the group were recording demos in New York with Mike Sapone. In an interview with AbsolutePunk in July, Reyes and Cooper revealed that the group had been demoing further material. Cooper said, "The new stuff we've been writing will far surpass [the self-titled]."

In October and November, the group toured to celebrate the 10th anniversary of their debut album Tell All Your Friends (2002). During an interview promoting the tour, Lazzara revealed that they had been working on new material: "It's really just a whole bunch of ideas that we're working on, solidifying." Following the end of the tour, the group took a break. In February 2013, the group went to West Virginia and wrote material for their next album, at what Lazzara said was at "a really old colonial house" that was located "on top of this mountain." Since all the members lived in different states—Lazzara and Nolan in North Carolina, Reyes in Ohio, and O'Connell and Cooper in New York—Lazzara said they went to this house as it was "kind of out of the way" and had few distractions. The group was there for around two weeks and, according to Lazzara, the cabin fever "really helped with some of the songwriting."

== Production ==
Lazzara said that by the time the group was going to record their next album, "we thought things went so well when we were demoing with [Hudson and Sapone], so if it ain't broke, don't fix it." He added, the pair were "just two guys we felt really comfortable with because they were our friends first." Though Sapone had been a friend of the band since their early days, the sessions marked the first time he had produced any album tracks. Hudson, who Lazzara called "a great friend of ours", had been touring with the band for a number of years. Lazzara said the group were initially worried that the album "might ... not sound cohesive" having been recorded in parts with different producers. On June 7, 2013, the band began recording at Rancho Recordo in Fenton, Michigan with Hudson. Following a few weeks of pre-production, O'Connell and Cooper tracked their parts, followed by Reyes in late June. In July, Lazzara and Nolan entered the studio for further work on the album.

Lazzara said Hudson and Jeffrey had "this really eclectic collection of gear, so we’ve been playing with it all." He added, he had been "sitting off and on with this little vocoder, which is so much fun to play." He also said that with a variety of instruments "[e]ach one has its own unique sound, and Hudson’s really good at capturing that." Lazzara said the group were unsigned when they entered the studio, which meant "there wasn't an outside influence ... It allowed us to try stuff that we typically wouldn't have tried." Nolan said when recording their self-titled album, the group's label heard recordings and would provide feedback, "so we wanted to just do something that the only influence came from the band and the producers." When recording his vocals, Lazzara says he tries "not focus so much on singing pitch perfect, but more on the delivery of it." With Hudson, the group recorded "Stood a Chance", "Beat Up Car", "They Don't Have Any Friends", "Better Homes and Gardens", "Like You Do", "We Were Younger Then", "How I Met Your Mother" and "Can You Feel (Here I Am)". Lazzara said Hudson "pays a lot of attention to detail in the songs themselves."

Ray Jeffrey handled additional vocal production and recording with assistance from Nathan Cogan. By August, the group were halfway done with the album, according to Lazzara. They took a break before going to Long Island, New York, where they recorded with Sapone producing, at his studio Sapone Productions. In mid-August, the group went into pre-production with Sapone. They recorded "Preface", "Flicker, Fade", "All the Way", "It Takes More", "Nothing at All" and "This Is Happening". Lazzara said Sapone was "more about capturing the mood." Dylan Ebrahimian contributed violin and electric violin, and Teddy Schumacher contributed cello. In October, guitarist John Nolan said that recording was done and the album was in the mixing stage. Claudius Mittendorfer mixed the album at Atomic Heart Studio in New York City. It was mastered by Stephen Marcussen and Stewart Whitmore at Marcussen Mastering in Hollywood, California. In retrospect, Nolan said that sessions with both producers "went really great ... It made for a more comfortable environment ... It all felt organic and natural."

== Music and lyrics ==
=== Overview ===
Lazzara looked through lyrics in an attempt to "find a phrase...that really stood out" for the title, however, he says "nothing really popped up...as the thing that should sum up the record." He eventually went with the title Happiness Is, as it was "kind of a blanket statement about where the band is right now." He said Happiness Is was "a great representation of us as a band right now", and that while it featured elements of their past work, they "always want to be moving forward." He also explained that the group went into writing with the mindset of "we're going to try every single idea that everyone has and we're going to see what sticks." He added that "through that, it allowed us to have fun with "All The Way" or "Nothing At All" or even "We Were Younger Then"". Nolan viewed the album as being "a little more diverse" then the self-titled. He added, "there's more ups and downs" compared to the Taking Back Sunday, where "every song was ... mid-tempo to up-tempo." Lazzara mentioned that the songs have been "more autobiographical, I think. For both [Nolan] and I."

Nolan said that there were a few songs where they "kind of just experimented with stuff that we never had before." He referred to "a little bit of an alt-country rock vibe that has crept in. Not over the top, but definitely a little bit into that territory." Nolan said that the Sapone-produced tracks sound "a lot more of a departure from what the band has done in the past." Lazzara mentioned that they had been pressured into writing "the right single" in the past, and "when you take that pressure out of the equation, those types of songs just appear." The group found it difficult to pick a track list for the album, as Nolan explained, "We do it very democratically, so there’s a lot of different opinions, and we went through all these different phases of, 'All right! This is it! We’ve got it now!' and then a week later, we’d totally change our minds on things." He added that on one occasion the group thought they would release it as a 13-track album, because they were unable to omit any songs. Critics have described the album's sound as alternative and pop rock, with elements of pop and punk rock.

=== Songs ===
"Flicker, Fade" was the first song written for the album. Lazzara said when they "listened to it we knew we were on the right track." He added that the song "kinda shaped what Happiness Is would become." He mentioned that the verses had existed for a while and went through a number of changes. When Nolan brought in the, what he called, "destroy what you create" section, Lazzara said "the song completely changed and took off." He called "Stood a Chance" "an upbeat poppy tune", and said it was "juxtaposed with a darker lyrical content." O'Connell came up with the main guitar riff for "Better Homes and Gardens", one of the songs that was written in West Virginia. Lazzara said they "just started writing it one day and worked back and forth" and that the lyrics "sort of happened right then."

On one occasion, Reyes and Lazzara were staying in a hotel that he said was "as close to one of those 1970s New York City hotels as I had seen in the movies ... Motel style, with ladies of the night, yelling at all hours, the works. It was the worst." This inspired the track "Like You Do", which was originally written simply for Lazzara with an acoustic guitar accompaniment. He remarked, "In the past I don't think I ever would have let a song like 'Like You Do' go on an album because it's so heartfelt in a simple way." "How I Met Your Mother" was left off the final version of the album as, according to Nolan, it "seemed to kind of stand out as something really different than anything else" on the album.

== Release ==
In August 2013, the group signed with independent label Hopeless Records and aimed to release their next album in spring 2014. Lazzara said that by being on a smaller label, "it's a smaller team, so in turn it feels like everyone there is more invested", and added that "everything with Hopeless has been great, and it’s nice to work with people who care about what you’re doing." In October and November, the band went on a headlining US tour, with support from Polar Bear Club and Transit. Partway through the tour, the group had to cancel three shows due to the early birth of Lazzara's son. Lazzara stayed at home with his family for a few days, which resulted in Spencer Chamberlain of Underoath/Sleepwave filling in for him. Lazzara subsequently returned to the tour in early November. While on this tour, the band frequently played "Flicker, Fade" and "Beat Up Car", but refrained from playing any other new material live before the album's release. The album's title, artwork, track listing and release date were announced on January 14, 2014, alongside the release of its first single "Flicker, Fade". Lazzara said the panther on the artwork was based on a panther tattoo that Reyes had. On one occasion, Lazzara and Nolan were listening to some records with a friend of theirs. While looking through the albums, Lazzara said, "There was something about the feel of them ... from the aesthetic and that was something that we wanted to try to emulate." Nolan said, "They effectively made it look like an old record."

The single "Flicker, Fade" was released on 7" vinyl, with "How I Met Your Mother" as the B-side, and its music video, directed by DJay Brawner, was released on January 28. In February, the band performed three shows in the UK. "Stood a Chance" was released as a single on March 3, and a music video for the song, directed by Evan Brace, premiered on March 5. Lazzara said the concept for the video, which came from Brace, was "very bright and colourful", which the band "had never done anything like" in the past. He mentioned that he originally wanted a video concept "[with] more of an upbeat feeling to it." However, because they "never tried anything that was seemingly that happy", they went with Brace's concept. The album was made available for streaming on March 10, before being released through Hopeless Records on March 18. On the same day, "Stood a Chance" was released to alternative radio stations. "How I Met Your Mother" was made available for streaming on March 19, followed by a performance at South by So What?! festival.

The band went on a co-headlining US tour with the Used in March and April, with support from Sleepwave and Tonight Alive. In between dates, the group played a small number of headlining shows. In mid-August, the band performed at Merthyr Rock festival in the UK. The group toured Australia with the Used in August, with support from Breakaway and Corpus, and the US in September and October with support from Frank Iero. Partway through the tour, the group released a split 10" vinyl EP, which featured two songs by the Used, and "Flicker, Fade" and "How I Met Your Mother" from Taking Back Sunday. Also in September, the band performed at the Chill on the Hill and Riot festivals. On November 18, a music video was released for "All the Way", directed by Megan Thompson and O'Connell. In November and December, the band toured Europe and the UK with Marmozets and Blitz Kids. Between mid-February and early April 2015, the band went on a headlining US tour with the Menzingers and Letlive. The tour included a performance at Atlantic City Beer & Music Festival.

Hopeless Records re-released the album on February 24, digitally and as a 7" vinyl box set. Under the title Happiness Is: The Complete Recordings, it includes all the songs of the original album, as well as "How I Met Your Mother", "This Is Happening", and "Can You Feel That (Here I Am)". It also includes three acoustic versions of album tracks that were recorded a few months prior. Lazzara said the reissue was the label's idea for the most part, and that the group wanted to release all the songs they had recorded for that record, however, they did not want to simply "put it out again with those songs added to it." They came up with the idea to issue a 7" vinyl box set, which allowed all of the songs to be given their own artwork. A music video was released for "Better Homes and Gardens" on May 18, 2015, and was directed by DJay Brawner. Lazzara explained: "[Reyes had the idea of] watching a home burn to the soundtrack of "Better Homes and Gardens". With the help of the Greensboro fire department we were able to make that happen." Later that month, the band performed at Slam Dunk Festival in the UK.

== Reception ==
Professional ratings
Aggregate scores
Source	Rating
Metacritic	71/100
Review scores
Source	Rating
AbsolutePunk	80%
AllMusic	4/5 stars
Alternative Press	3.5/5 stars
Big Cheese	8/10
DIY	3/5 stars
Punknews.org	3/5 stars
Revolver	4/5
Sputnikmusic	3.2/5
Ultimate Guitar	7.3/10
USA Today	3/4 stars

=== Critical response ===
Happiness Is received generally favorable reviews, according to review aggregation website Metacritic. AbsolutePunk writer Drew Beringer wrote that the album "showcases how much each member of Taking Back Sunday has grown as an individual and a musician." AllMusic reviewer Gregory Heaney stated that the release "shows that they've honed their skills, creating a beautifully crafted, well-constructed album that feels like more than merely a collection of songs, but rather an album full of soaring builds and heartbreaking collapses that lends credence to the notion that the best things come to those who wait." In a review for Alternative Press, Scott Heisel wrote that it was a "comfortable album that doesn’t contain any sort of crazy sonic left turns." He stated that, while the release is a good one, "unfortunately, a 'good' record just isn't good enough anymore." Paul Hagen of Big Cheese noted that the album "sounds like a band revitalised." He gave Hudson and Sapone credit "for ensuring the album has the sufficient dynamism without becoming smothered in over-production."

DIY's Sarah Jamieson said there were "Big rock songs [that] resound" and that the group's "take on life feels a little more grounded, a little more mature." Punknews.org staff member Toir Pederson said that it could be viewed as "a bit of return to form...but will come as a disappointment" for those who enjoyed the group's two previous albums. Revolver writer Jonah Bayer said that the release facilitated the band "getting their groove back" to that of the original lineup. Sputnikmusic reviewer Anthom wrote that the album "essentially sounds like a Straylight Run record being fronted by Adam Lazzara", referring to the group Nolan and Cooper played in. However, he added that it was a "warming shot of feel good guitar pop and bright choruses" that was "easily on par" with the group's latter albums. Ultimate Guitar said that the album was "mixed well, and the songs are engaging", as well as that the group "has really taken a turn for the better" since the reintroduction of Nolan and Cooper. Edna Gunderson of USA Today wrote that "warmth and wit almost compensate for a lack of distinction and the loss of punk sting."

Alternative Addiction wrote that the album is "a little bit of everything that they've done well" with their previous few records. They called the band an "awesome monster floating in their own bubble," and said that "this LP lets you peek into the different faces that they've made over the years." The AU Review writer Ruby Niemann wrote that the album had a "sound that's refreshingly, deliciously similar", and said the songs were "still hook-heavy and excitable." Overall, she called the album a "really solid return to form." Alyssa Dempsey of idobi wrote that the record displays the group's "ability to move forward musically without abandoning their signature style." She added that it "proves to be a masterful album with songs held up to clearly high standards." Ash Goldberg, a reviewer for themusic, noted that despite numerous lineup changes, "it's amazing Taking Back Sunday are still around for record number six, let alone sounding as good as they do." He added that the group "offer[ed] up [their] best effort since 2006's Louder Now".

=== Commercial performance ===
Happiness Is debuted at number 10 on the Billboard 200 chart, selling 22,000 copies in the first week. It was an improvement over their self-titled album, which peaked at number 17 in 2011. The album charted at number one on both the Independent Albums and Tastemaker Albums charts, number two on the Vinyl Albums chart, number four on both the Alternative Albums and Top Rock Albums charts, and number 15 on the Digital Albums chart. In addition, it also charted at number 53 in the UK and number 94 in Australia. The album has sold 55,000 copies in the United States as of August 2016.

=== Legacy ===
In 2017, Cooper said that the album "isn’t as complete of a thought" as the band's self-titled one or Tidal Wave (2016). He added that, while it featured "some great songs", it did not have any that he would consider "quintessential Taking Back Sunday." In a retrospective piece for Fuse.tv, writer Jason Lipshutz ranked the album as his sixth favorite Taking Back Sunday album. He said the album does not "conjure as many lumps in your throat or result in as many head-bangs" when compared to the group's earlier records, however, it manages to keep the "good vibes from the self-titled album going."

== Track listing ==
All songs written by Taking Back Sunday.

No.	Title	Producer	Length
1.	"Preface"	Mike Sapone	1:26
2.	"Flicker, Fade"	Sapone	4:33
3.	"Stood a Chance"	Marc Jacob Hudson	3:39
4.	"All the Way"	Sapone	3:48
5.	"Beat Up Car"	Hudson	3:11
6.	"It Takes More"	Sapone	5:11
7.	"They Don't Have Any Friends"	Hudson	3:48
8.	"Better Homes and Gardens"	Hudson	3:54
9.	"Like You Do"	Hudson	2:47
10.	"We Were Younger Then"	Hudson	4:42
11.	"Nothing at All"	Sapone	3:59
Total length:			40:58

The Complete Recordings bonus tracks
No.	Title	Producer	Length
12.	"How I Met Your Mother"	Hudson	3:08
13.	"This Is Happening"	Sapone	3:37
14.	"Can You Feel That (Here I Am)"	Hudson	3:57
15.	"Stood a Chance" (acoustic)		4:32
16.	"Better Homes and Gardens" (acoustic)		4:05
17.	"Like You Do" (acoustic)		3:18

== Personnel ==
Personnel per sleeve.

Taking Back Sunday

- Shaun Cooper – bass guitar
- Adam Lazzara – lead vocals
- John Nolan – lead guitar, keyboards, vocals
- Mark O'Connell – drums, percussion
- Eddie Reyes – rhythm guitar

Additional musicians

- Dylan Ebrahimian – violin, electric violin
- Teddy Schumacher – cello

Technical personnel

- Marc Jacob Hudson – producer
- Ray Jeffrey – additional vocal production, additional recording
- Nathan Cogan – production assistant
- Mike Sapone – producer, engineer
- Claudius Mittendorfer – mixing
- Stephen Marcussen – mastering
- Stewart Whitmore – mastering
- Brian Manley – artwork

== Chart performance ==
Chart (2014)	Peak position
Australian Albums Chart	94
UK Official Charts Company	53
US Billboard 200	10
US Billboard Alternative Albums	4
US Billboard Digital Albums	15
US Billboard Independent Albums	1
US Billboard Tastemaker Albums	1
US Billboard Top Rock Albums	4
US Billboard Vinyl Albums	2
