= Straylight Run (album) =

2004 debut studio album by Straylight Run

Studio album by Straylight Run
- Released: October 12, 2004
- Recorded: March–June 2004
- Studio: Apple Head, Woodstock, New York
- Genre: Indie rock
- Length: 49:07
- Label: Victory
- Producer: Michael Birnbaum; Chris Bittner

Straylight Run chronology
Straylight Run (2004)	Prepare to Be Wrong (2005)

Straylight Run is the self-titled debut studio album by American indie rock band Straylight Run. It was released on October 12, 2004, through Victory Records. The band was formed by guitarist John Nolan and bassist Shaun Cooper, after both of them left Taking Back Sunday in early 2003. They recruited Breaking Pangaea drummer Will Noon and John's sister Michelle Nolan, to complete the line-up. The band recorded some demos and toured throughout the remainder of 2003 before beginning work on the album. Straylight Run tracked it at Apple Head Studios in Woodstock, New York, between March and June 2004, with producers Michael Birnbaum and Chris Bittner.

The band embarked on several accompanying tours across the United States with the likes of Hot Rod Circuit, Something Corporate, and Firescape, as well as delivering performances for The Bamboozle festival and on Last Call with Carson Daly. The music on Straylight Run moved away from the emo sound of Taking Back Sunday, transitioning into piano-centred indie rock material, drawing comparisons to the Anniversary and Bright Eyes. The album received generally positive reviews from music critics, with a few complimenting the sound though others disliked the production.

Straylight Run reached number 100 on the US Billboard 200 in the first week of release, with sales of 11,000 copies. It further charted at number four on the Billboard Independent Albums component chart. As of September 2005, the album has sold over 225,000 copies in the US.

== Background ==
Taking Back Sunday released their debut studio album Tell All Your Friends in 2002; the band found themselves at the forefront of the emo music scene. Guitarist John Nolan, citing exhaustion from touring, left Taking Back Sunday, while bassist Shaun Cooper left shortly thereafter. Frontman Adam Lazzara said that he thought Nolan and Cooper were having difficulty adjusting to long-term touring; however, Nolan later accused Lazzara of being unfaithful to his sister, Michelle, with whom Lazzara was in a relationship, citing this as his reason for leaving the band. In May 2003, John Nolan and Cooper formed a new band; the pair tracked demos with the aid of Taking Back Sunday drummer Mark O'Connell. The recordings laid the groundwork for their new sound: piano-and-guitar oriented pop songs, which would include samples, drum loops and other sounds.

After the demos had been recorded, Will Noon, formerly of Breaking Pangaea, was recruited as the band's permanent drummer. Cooper and Noon had previously played together, while Cooper and Nolan were familiar with Noon's work as part of Breaking Pangaea. Following a month of practice, the trio decided that the band needed another member. John was sharing an apartment with Michelle at the time, with him learning that she was writing her own songs but had no plans to do anything with the songs. Observing her talent, John Nolan decided to recruit her as the fourth band member. (Note: At the time, Michelle Nolan was working with Cattlebeast, with whom she had recorded upwards of 20 tracks. Those songs were later compiled into the album Cattlebeast vs. Michelle, which was released in 2005 through Regular Records.) With their line-up complete, the quartet continued practicing and recorded a few more tracks in the following months. When they felt ready to debut the band to the wider public, they settled on the name Straylight Run, after a large amount of discussion and debating.

In August 2003, Nolan and Cooper featured on a radio showcase, where they promoted the band; shortly after the appearance, fan-recorded versions of the songs were posted on the internet. Due to the positive reaction, Straylight Run quickly posted demo recordings of the tracks on their website. The web traffic for the new songs crashed the website, and in turn, forced them to find a better site for helping keep up with the demand. Within four months of the six demos being posted online, the band were playing sold-out shows. Around this time, Straylight Run were attracting offers from major labels as well as interest from music producers and managers who wished to work with them. The band embarked on a brief headlining tour of the northeast United States in September 2003; subsequent touring closed out the year, including their first full US tour that they co-headlined with the New Amsterdams, and stints alongside the Format and Coheed and Cambria.

== Writing and production ==
Straylight Run spent most of December 2003 working on new material and making plans to record their debut studio album, before supporting Brand New on their tour of the United Kingdom in January 2004. As part of the writing process, John and Michelle played the band acoustic tracks and worked on the tracks' arrangements. On some occasions, the tracks retained their original structure, but some had a different feel to them after each member added their parts. Prior to recording, the band played the new songs during their tours, giving them the opportunity to develop and change the songs. As a result of this, Straylight Run comfortable with how the songs were played and required little input from the producers during the studio sessions.

In March 2004, the band travelled to Woodstock, New York, to record the album at Apple Head Studios, away from John Nolan and Cooper's hometown of Amityville on Long Island. After a brief break to play at the Skate & Surf Fest, recording resumed, and concluded in June of that year. Straylight Run lived in a cabin across from the studio, which was located on a big ranch in the middle of the woods. Pre-production was done by Mike Sapone at Sapone Studios in Bethpage, New York, for the tracks "The Tension and the Terror", "Existentialism on Prom Night", "Mistakes We Knew We Were Making", and "It's for the Best". Straylight Run was produced and recorded by both Michael Birnbaum and Chris Bittner; the pair also mixed the album. The band heard positive things about Birnbaum's work with Coheed and Cambria; their manager had similarly positive experiences with Birnbaum previously. The band re-recorded their earlier demos and created new songs during the sessions. Nate Ruess of the Format contributed vocals to "It's for the Best", while Linda Nolan of the Nolans and Laura June Kirsch both provided additional vocals on "Sympathy for the Martyr".

== Composition and lyrics ==
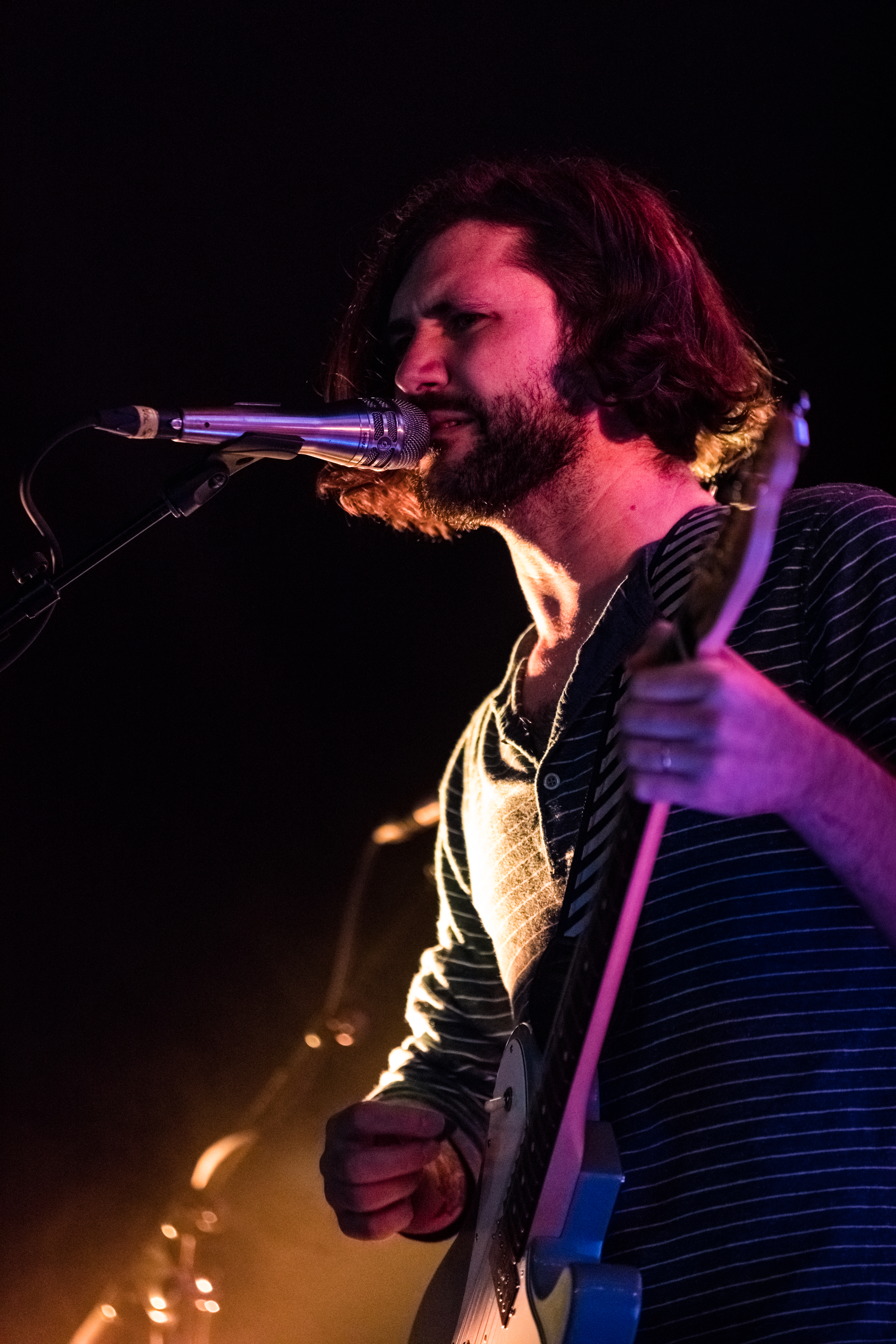
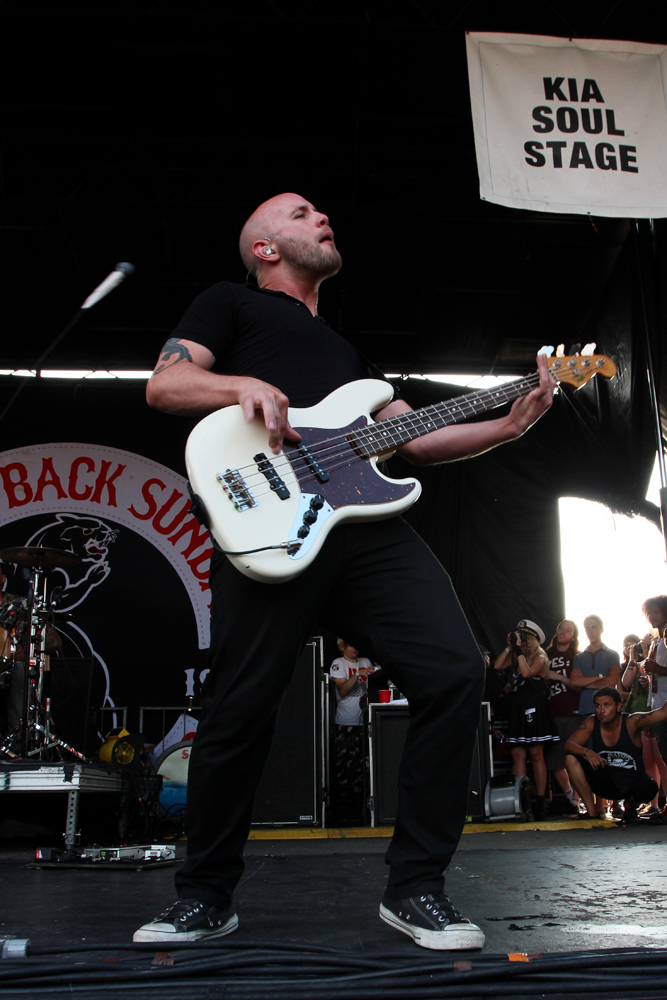
Straylight Run featured John Nolan (left) and Shaun Cooper (right) leaving behind the emo sound of Taking Back Sunday in favor of piano-focused indie rock.

John Nolan said that the change in sound between Tell All Your Friends and Straylight Run might appear to be drastic for fans of Taking Back Sunday, when in reality the change showcased several years of writing development. The songs featured on Tell All Your Friends were a few years old by the time the album came out, which meant there was a long period between the writing of the songs and the ones that would appear on Straylight Run. Nolan said that during this time, he grew as a songwriter. The final batch of songs written for the album shed the remaining remnants of Taking Back Sunday's sound.

Straylight Run shifted away from the emo sound of Taking Back Sunday, transitioning into an indie rock sound; the shift had been compared to what happened with Blake Schwarzenbach when he left Jawbreaker to form Jets to Brazil. Though Straylight Run retains the introspective lyricism commonly found in emo, it has more of an emphasis on a piano-based sound. The inclusion of synth parts and male–female vocal dynamics drew comparisons to the Anniversary and Bright Eyes. Michelle Nolan sings lead vocals on "Tool Sheds and Hot Tubs" and "Now It's Done", alongside providing backing vocals throughout the rest of the album.

Straylight Run's opening track, "The Perfect Ending", contains only John Nolan's vocals over pianos, alongside accompanying bells by Noon. "The Tension and the Terror" starts with the song's hook and minimalist vocals from John, before him and Michelle harmonize vocally on the chorus; later in the song, John plays a guitar solo. "Existentialism on Prom Night" escalates from a lone piano and vocal track to expansive chords and backing parts. John Nolan said the track is about being in love and "finally feeling optimistic about your future and looking forward to the rest of your life." "Another Word for Desperate" and "Mistakes We Knew We Were Making" were described as reminiscent of 1980s power ballads; the former incorporates a coda and violins at the end.

"Your Name Here (Sunrise Highway)" is a reference to one of Long Island's highways, Sunrise Highway. The track was written a few years prior to its appearance on the album, and serves as a sequel to "There's No 'I' in Team", a track from Tell All Your Friends. "There's No 'I' in Team" was written in response to a feud between Nolan and Brand New frontman Jesse Lacey. (Note: Lacey's perspective of the incident was chronicled in the Brand New song "Seventy Times 7".) The chorus to "Your Name Here (Sunrise Highway)" gives rough directions to Nolan's residence in Massapequa, New York, at the time. Nolan said it was "more 'I miss my best friend,' instead of all the angsty yelling [on 'Team']." "Tool Sheds and Hot Tubs" features up-tempo electronic instrumentation, which includes synths, earning it a comparison to work of I Am the World Trade Center. The closing track, "Sympathy for the Martyr", incorporates the band's musical strengths – piano-focused verse sections, Michelle's harmony parts, and an "anthematic second verse."

== Release and promotion ==
On April 24, 2004, Straylight Run signed to independent record label Victory Records. On the same day, Straylight Run was scheduled for release later that year. Shortly afterwards, the band performed at the Skate and Surf Festival. They went on a US tour with Rooney, Ozma, and the Redwalls in June and July 2004. On July 17, the album was announced for release in September of that year. Straylight Run appeared on the KROQ-FM show Domestic Disturbance, where they debuted a new track from Straylight Run and performed live. On September 26, 2004, the band filmed a music video for "Existentialism on Prom Night" on a subway train. They got clearance from the New York City transit authority and the video was shot over a six-hour period. The subway train repeatedly drove back and forth between two stations for the shooting. The video, which was directed by Major Lightner, was featured in regular rotation on MTV. After initially being scheduled for a September 21 release, Straylight Run was released on October 12, 2004, through Victory Records. To promote its release, Straylight Run delivered two in-store acoustic performances in New York City. In October and November 2004, the band went on tour with Hot Rod Circuit, Northstar, and Say Anything.

On January 7, 2005, Straylight Run won a fan-voted contest on Launch.com, which earned them the spot to deliver a live-in-the-studio performance of "Existentialism on Prom Night". In January and February 2005, the band toured across the US alongside Something Corporate, Hidden in Plain View, the Academy Is..., and Armor for Sleep. Following the tour, Straylight Run played a few headlining US shows in February, with support from Firescape, Action Action, and Bella Lea, before they embarked on a UK tour in March of that year. In April and May 2005, the band headlined the Alternative Press/Vans tour with support from Minus the Bear, Gratitude, the Honorary Title, and Spitalfield. During this time, the band performed at The Bamboozle festival and appeared on Last Call with Carson Daly. Straylight Run was released on vinyl for the first time in April 2012, and subsequently re-pressed in November 2013.

== Reception ==
Professional ratings
Review scores
Source	Rating
AllMusic	3.5/5 stars
LAS Magazine	6.5/10
Melodic	2.5/5 stars
Spin	B−
Sputnikmusic	4/5

AllMusic reviewer Johnny Loftus said that the while Straylight Run includes some elements of emo, the "songwriting is more varied than many in that genre offer in the mid-2000s." He continued, saying Straylight Run "crafted a fine debut" that would "certainly please emo fans." In a brief review, the staff of Spin compared Nolan leaving Taking Back Sunday to form Straylight Run with "trading the football team for the choral society."

Sputnikmusic's Adam Downer found the album to be "an amazing, beautiful piece of work" with "some truly sensational anthem-ballads" and "solid tracks in the middle." Downer also said that the middle tracks felt like a "bit of a letdown" when compared to the first and last portions of the album, but concluded that "there is really no terrible track." Yahoo! Music reviewer Rob O'Connor noted that the "emphasis here is more on texture than catharsis," save for the "epic sense of drama of an '80s power ballad" in two of the tracks. He said that Michelle Nolan's vocal appearance serves as "an extra change-up," with the rest of the band "turn[ing] 'twee' for a moment of heavenly shuffle" on "Tool Sheds and Hot Tubs".

Kaj Roth of Melodic wrote that Straylight Run "takes you on a trip over the clouds in the atmosphere" with the "dreamlike and emotional vocals perfectly packaged." Exclaim! writer Sam Sutherland called the album "a let down," criticizing the "glossy over-production" and "obscene amount of pitch correction." He described the demos as "raw and emotionally charged," while saying that the finished versions "reek of insincerity and technological tweaking." LAS Magazine's Natalie B. David considered the tracks with Nolan on lead vocals to be the weakest on the album, while also saying that a number of the songs "would be severely lacking without her."

Commercially, Straylight Run reached number 100 on the US Billboard 200, with first week sales of over 11,000 copies. It also entered at number four on Billboard's Independent Albums chart. As of September 2005, the album had sold over 225,000 copies in the US. "Existentialism on Prom Night" appeared on a list of the best emo songs by Vulture. Alternative Press ranked "Existentialism on Prom Night" at number 59 on their list of the best 100 singles from the 2000s.

== Track listing ==
All songs written by Straylight Run. All songs produced by Michael Birnbaum and Chris Bittner.

1. "The Perfect Ending" – 4:53
2. "The Tension and the Terror" – 3:39
3. "Existentialism on Prom Night" – 4:01
4. "Another Word for Desperate" – 5:20
5. "Mistakes We Knew We Were Making" – 3:39
6. "Dignity and Money" – 3:34
7. "Your Name Here (Sunrise Highway)" – 5:06
8. "Tool Sheds and Hot Tubs" – 3:54
9. "It's for the Best" – 4:21
10. "Now It's Done" – 4:44
11. "Sympathy for the Martyr" – 5:51

== Personnel ==
Personnel per booklet.

Straylight Run

- Shaun Cooper – bass
- Michelle Nolan – lead vocals (tracks 8 and 10), backing vocals, guitar, piano
- John Nolan – vocals, guitar, piano, glockenspiel
- Will Noon – drums, percussion

Additional musicians

- Nate Ruess – vocals (track 9)
- Linda Nolan – additional vocals (track 11)
- Laura June Kirsch – additional vocals (track 11)

Production

- Michael Birnbaum – producer, recording, mixing
- Chris Bittner – producer, recording, mixing
- Mike Sapone – pre-production (tracks 2, 3, 5, and 9)
- Laura June Kirsch – band silhouette photographs
- Eugene Kotlyarenko – multimedia
- Jason Oda – layout

== Charts ==
Chart performance for Straylight Run
Charts (2004)	Peak position
US Billboard 200	100
US Independent Albums (Billboard)	4

== See also ==
- Designing a Nervous Breakdown – the 2000 album by the Anniversary, the sound of whom Straylight Run was compared to
- Four Cornered Night – the 2000 album by Jets to Brazil, the sound of whom Straylight Run was compared to
