= Un Mas Dos =

EP by Straylight Run
- Released: September 16, 2008
- Genre: Indie rock
- Length: 11:33

Straylight Run chronology
The Needles the Space (2007)	Un Mas Dos (2008)	About Time (2009)

Professional ratings
Review scores
Source	Rating
AbsolutePunk.net	75% Link

Un Mas Dos is the second EP by American indie rock band Straylight Run, released on September 16, 2008. The EP is the band's first release since they were dropped by Universal Republic and since the departure of vocalist, guitarist and pianist Michelle DaRosa. Straylight Run entered the studio on June 10 and was expected to finish work on the EP in around early August, 2008. In September 2008 the band went on a headlining US tour, which was followed by a supporting slot for Anberlin on their headlining tour until November 2008. In February and March 2009, the band toured Australia as part of the Soundwave festival.

== Reception ==
AbsolutePunk reviewer Adrian Villagomez awarded the album a rating of 75%. Commenting on the three songs, he noted opener "Wait and Watch" as the "angriest song on the EP, but it’s also the weakest", "Ten Ton Shoes" "is the anchor of Un Mas Dos, and the band sticks to the message already familiar to the listener – the world will beat you down and eat you alive", whilst labelling "Try" as the standout track "it deserves repeat listens... it’s tough to resist singing along to his (vocalist John Nolan's) earnest and frustrated voice as the hook grabs hold." Villagomez stated, "Switching between this EP and the band's previous material, I'm inclined to blame the production for keeping Nolan's voice too far from the forefront – this is my chief criticism with the release."

== Track listing ==
No.	Title	Length
1.	"Wait and Watch"	4:30
2.	"Try"	3:19
3.	"Ten Ton Shoes"	3:44
