= John Nolan (musician) =

American musician (born 1978)

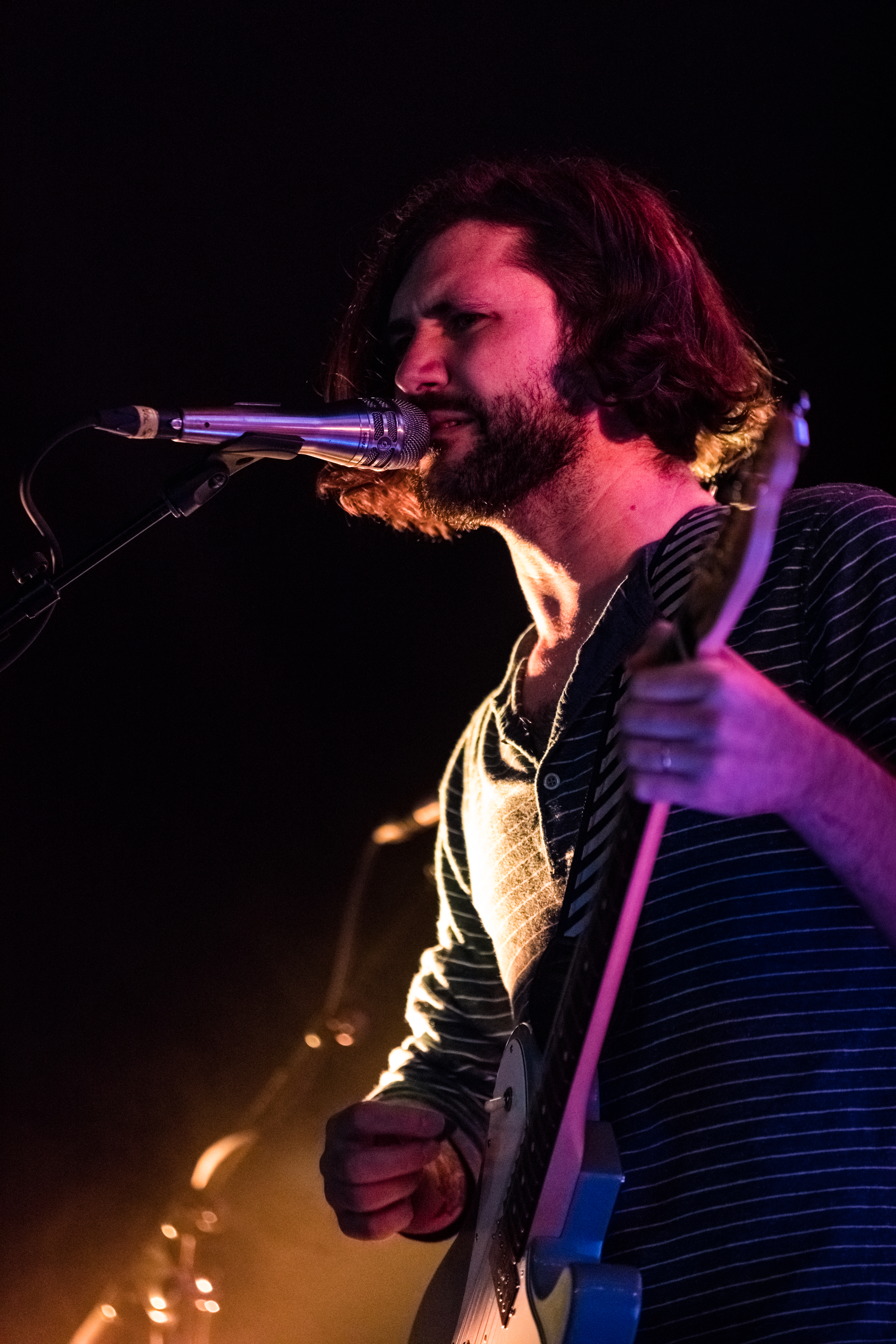
- Nolan in 2018

Background information
- Born: February 24, 1978 (age 48); Baltimore, Maryland, U.S.
- Genres: Indie rock; alternative rock; pop punk; post-hardcore; emo
- Occupations: Musician, singer-songwriter
- Instruments: Vocals; guitar; keyboards; piano
- Years active: 1999–present
- Labels: Doghouse; Victory; Republic; Hopless; Fantasy
- Member of: Taking Back Sunday
- Formerly of: Straylight Run
- Website: johnnolanmusic.bandcamp.com

John Thomas Nolan (born February 24, 1978) is an American musician best known as the guitarist and co-lead vocalist of Taking Back Sunday, and the former lead singer, pianist, and guitarist of Straylight Run.

Nolan left Taking Back Sunday in 2003 along with bassist Shaun Cooper, with whom he formed Straylight Run. During March 2010, he and Cooper rejoined Taking Back Sunday, reforming the Tell All Your Friends-era lineup. Nolan is also a solo artist and has recorded an album called Height and "Live at Looney Tunes."

== Biography ==
John Thomas Nolan was born in Baltimore, Maryland, then at three, moved to Rockville Centre, Nassau County, New York, United States. As member of the band Taking Back Sunday he performs lead guitar, vocals and keyboards, in Straylight Run he performs lead vocals, piano, and guitar.

=== Taking Back Sunday ===
In 1999, John was recruited into Taking Back Sunday by Jesse Lacey. He later would invite Adam Lazzara to join the band. In 2002 the band would release their debut album, Tell All Your Friends. He would leave the band in 2003 to pursue a different musical direction, along with personal differences with other band members.

In late March 2010, he and Shaun Cooper rejoined Taking Back Sunday. In 2011, the band released a self-titled album that peaked at number 17 on the Billboard 200, the first since Nolan's rejoining. In 2014, the band released Happiness Is, which debuted at number 10 in the Billboard 200 and went to number 1 on Billboard's top independent albums chart, becoming Nolan's highest-charting album.

=== Straylight Run ===
In 2003, John would go on to form Straylight Run with his sister Michelle DaRosa, drummer Will Noon and former Taking Back Sunday bassist Shaun Cooper. In 2004 the band released their self-titled debut album which peaked at number 100 in the Billboard 200, and number 4 in the Billboard Independent Albums chart.

From 2004 to 2009 Straylight Run would release two albums and four EP's. The band's 2007 record, The Needles The Space would debut at number 72 in the Billboard 200, marking the band's highest position on that chart. The band's 2005 Prepare to be Wrong EP charted at number 168.

On February 16, 2010, it was announced that Straylight Run was on "hiatus", with a live album to be released in the future.

=== Solo ===
Nolan announced on his MySpace blog on May 1, 2009, that he had decided to work on some solo material, some of which can be found on his MySpace and Bandcamp profiles. His first solo album, Height, was released on October 27, 2009, on Doghouse Records. John toured the Midwest and east coast with Person L and Brian Bonz in November and in January with support from Gabriel the Marine and Ocean is Theory.

In 2014 Nolan provided the song "Here Comes the Wolf" to the soundtrack of the Jason Michael Brescia film, Bridge and Tunnel. The song was nominated for several awards in the film festival circuit, and was the recipient of "Best Original Song" at the 2014 Long Island International Film Expo. He also provides backup vocals and co-songwriting credit on the Gabriel the Marine track "Round and Round."

On July 27, 2015, Nolan released his second solo album, Sad, Strange, Beautiful Dream. The album was made possible by a successful PledgeMusic campaign.

=== Personal ===
Nolan currently lives in the NoDa neighborhood of Charlotte, North Carolina, with wife Camille, and a son and daughter. Nolan lives down the road from bandmate Adam Lazzara, who is a North Carolina native.

== Discography ==
With Taking Back Sunday

- Taking Back Sunday EP (2001)
- Lullaby EP (2001)
- Tell All Your Friends (2002)
- Taking Back Sunday (2011)
- Happiness Is (2014)
- Tidal Wave (2016)
- 152 (2023)

With Straylight Run

- Straylight Run (2004)
- Prepare To Be Wrong EP (2005)
- The Needles the Space (2007)
- Un Mas Dos EP (2008)
- About Time EP (2009)

Solo

- The Collaboration Experiment (2009)
- Height (2009)
- Live at Southpaw (2009)
- Live at Looney Tunes CDs (2010)
- Songs I Wrote (2010)
- Songs I Didn't Write (2010)
- Sad Strange Beautiful Dream (2015)
- Abendigo (2018)

== Videography ==
- Drinking Your Way To Confidence
- Street Robbery Blues (Punks in Vegas Session)
- American Nightclub 1999 (Punks in Vegas Session)

== Gear ==
It has been noted that John uses a Fender Telecaster Deluxe due to its feel, but prefers the sound of a Gibson Les Paul. He uses a Big Bite pedal into a Marshall JCM800 amplifier to create his crunch tone. He also uses a Fender '72 Telecaster Thinline on occasion.
