= Michelle DaRosa =

American singer

- Born: Michelle Nolan; September 13, 1980 (age 45)
- Genres: Indie rock Alternative rock
- Occupations: Musician, songwriter
- Instruments: Guitar, piano
- Years active: 2002–present

Michelle DaRosa (née Nolan) is an American musician, formerly of the band Straylight Run, for whom she was a vocalist, guitarist, and pianist.

== Biography ==
Michelle DaRosa was born Michelle Nolan on September 13, 1980, in Rockville Centre, Nassau County, New York to Tom and Linda Nolan. Like her brother and former bandmate, John Nolan, she grew up in Baldwin, Nassau County, New York. She attended South Shore Christian School in Levittown, New York for her freshman and second years of high school. She then attended Baldwin High School in Baldwin, New York for her junior and senior years. During her junior and senior years of high school, Michelle also attended Nassau Tech in Westbury, New York to study cosmetology.

She provided background vocals for two of the songs off of Taking Back Sunday's debut album, Tell All Your Friends ("Bike Scene" and "Ghost Man on Third"). Also, Michelle was formerly a nanny, hairdresser, and a ballet dancer. She married fellow musician Jeff DaRosa (of the Dropkick Murphys) on October 6, 2006, and has since taken his last name. They live together in Boston.

In January 2006, Michelle made an appearance on MTV's Total Request Live, singing back-up vocals for Coheed and Cambria's song "The Suffering". Michelle also contributed vocals on the song "Lightning Strikes Twice in New York" by the band Men, Women and Children.

On June 3, 2008, Michelle left Straylight Run on friendly terms to pursue a solo career. Her new band, Destry, featured Shaun Cooper, bassist of Straylight Run, and Sam Means, guitarist of The Format.

Shaun Cooper and Sam Means have since left Destry. Tyler Odom (ex-Northstar) has taken the place of Means, and Jeff DaRosa (Dropkick Murphys) can be seen on bass in place of Shaun Cooper.

== Discography ==
- Tell All Your Friends (2002 as Michelle Nolan)
- Demo – (2003 as Straylight Run)
- Straylight Run (2004 as Straylight Run)
- Prepare To Be Wrong EP (2005 as Straylight Run)
- The Needles the Space (2007 as Straylight Run) – Credited as Michelle DaRosa.
- TNTS Digital - EP (2007 as Straylight Run) exclusively on the iTunes Store
- It Goes On (2009 as Destry)
