= Silent Majority (hip-hop group) =

- Origin: Switzerland
- Genres: Hip hop
- Years active: 1994–1998

Silent Majority was a Swiss rap and hip hop music group. Founded in 1994 they were produced by Goetz (U2, Faithless). Considered turntable pioneers at the forefront of Swiss hip-hop. Silent Majority are unusual within the scene, defining themselves as "funky multi-linguals", and rap in "a mixture of English, Jamaican patois, French, Spanish and Swahili."

The members of Silent Majority decided to split up right after the release of their last album, Nightbloomers, in 1998.
