= Straylight Run =

American indie rock band

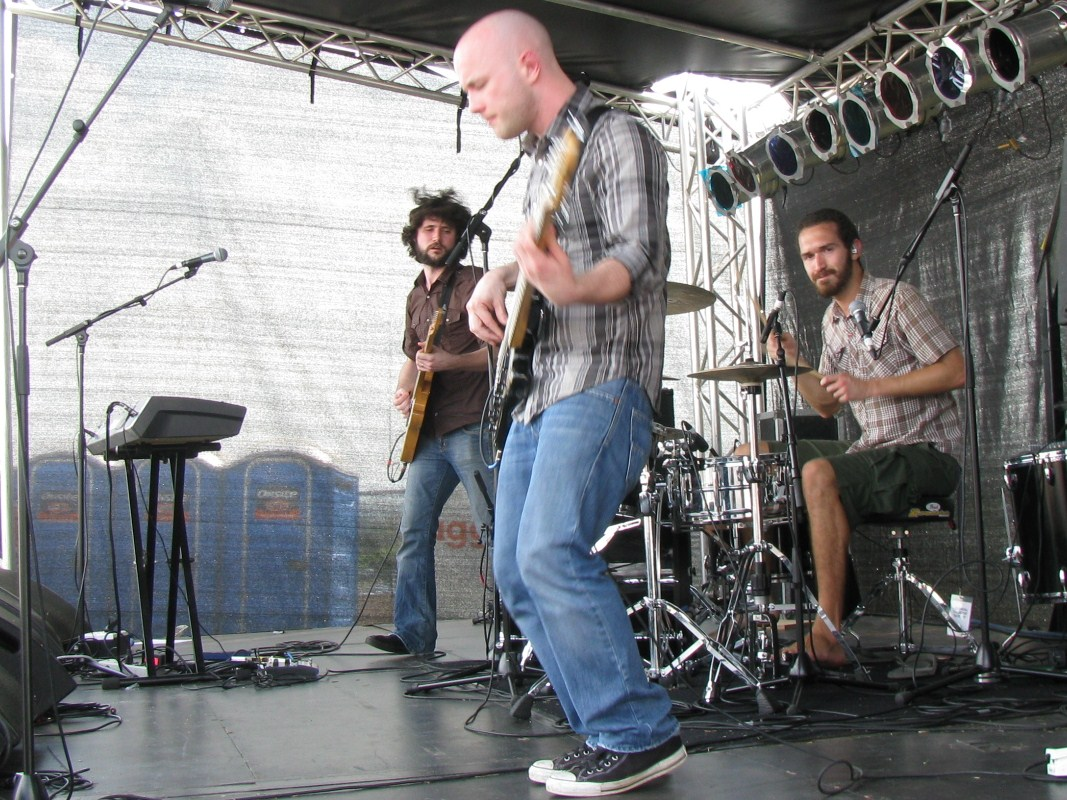
- Straylight Run performing in 2009. Left to right: John Nolan, Shaun Cooper, and Will Noon.

Background information
- Origin: Baldwin, New York, U.S.
- Genres: Indie rock; emo
- Years active: 2003–2010; 2021; 2025
- Labels: Victory; Universal Republic
- Spinoffs: Destry
- Spinoff of: Taking Back Sunday
- Members: Shaun Cooper; Michelle DaRosa; John Nolan; Will Noon
- Past members: Mark O'Connell
- Website: myspace.com/straylightrun

Straylight Run was an American indie rock band from Baldwin, New York. The band formed in 2003 after founders John Nolan and Shaun Cooper left Taking Back Sunday. They released two albums, Straylight Run and The Needles the Space, as well as three EPs, Prepare to Be Wrong, Un Mas Dos, and About Time.

In 2010, the band announced an indefinite hiatus because of financial reasons. Nolan and Cooper rejoined Taking Back Sunday shortly after.

== History ==
Vocalist-guitarist John Nolan and bassist Shaun Cooper left Taking Back Sunday in 2003 after tensions brewed between Nolan and Taking Back Sunday lead singer Adam Lazzara. Lazzara was alleged to have cheated on Nolan's sister, Michelle DaRosa, while the two were dating. The two formed Straylight Run in 2003 with DaRosa as the band's pianist, guitarist and second vocalist. Taking Back Sunday drummer Mark O'Connell played on the first Straylight Run demo but did not participate in both bands simultaneously after that. The band was named after a reference from William Gibson's cyberpunk science-fiction novel Neuromancer.

Nolan was replaced in Taking Back Sunday by Breaking Pangaea lead singer Fred Mascherino, causing that band to break up. Nolan and Cooper approached Breaking Pangaea's drummer Will Noon to join Straylight Run, and that rounded out their lineup.

The band gained popularity after posting six demo songs for free download on their official site. The group embarked on a brief headlining tour in the Northeast in September 2003 with support from Christiansen and JamisonParker. In October, the band went on their first full US tour, co-headlining the trek with the New Amsterdams. Following this, the band toured with the Format in November, and supported Coheed and Cambria in December. The band spent most of the month working on new material and making plans to record their debut. In January 2004, the band supported Brand New on their tour of the UK.

=== Straylight Run (2004) ===
Due to John's and Shaun's involvement in their previous band, they were bound by contract to release an album under Victory Records. They began to record their first album in April 2004 and released their debut album, Straylight Run, on October 12, 2004, after a one-month postponement. The album sold over 11,000 copies in the first week, and made the Billboard Top 100 Albums list. The album featured Nate Ruess, former lead singer of The Format and the indie-pop group fun. on the song "It's For the Best". In late 2005, the band toured with Simple Plan.

=== Prepare to Be Wrong EP (2005) ===
On October 4, 2005, the band released their second record in the form of the Prepare to Be Wrong EP. The CD comprised two old demos ("A Slow Descent" from the band's original demo, and "It Never Gets Easier", a demo from the sessions for their first CD, Straylight Run, although it was then known as "Costello"), a cover of Bob Dylan's "With God on Our Side" and three new songs. The CD ended their contract with Victory Records. Plans for a live DVD were in the works but were shelved.

=== The Needles the Space (2007) ===
On June 19, 2007, the band released their second album, The Needles the Space, under Universal Records.

On December 8, 2007, the band was dropped from Universal Records.

The band toured in support of Bayside in February and early March, 2008. The band toured in support of The Used on the inaugural Get a Life Tour from March 31 to May 11, 2008.

On June 3, 2008, Michelle DaRosa announced that she would leave Straylight Run to pursue a solo career. In her Myspace message, she left the door open to rejoining the band at some future time. In late 2008, DaRosa formed the band Destry, which also featured Sam Means of the indie rock group The Format, as well as Shaun Cooper from Straylight Run.

=== Un Mas Dos EP and indefinite hiatus (2008–present) ===
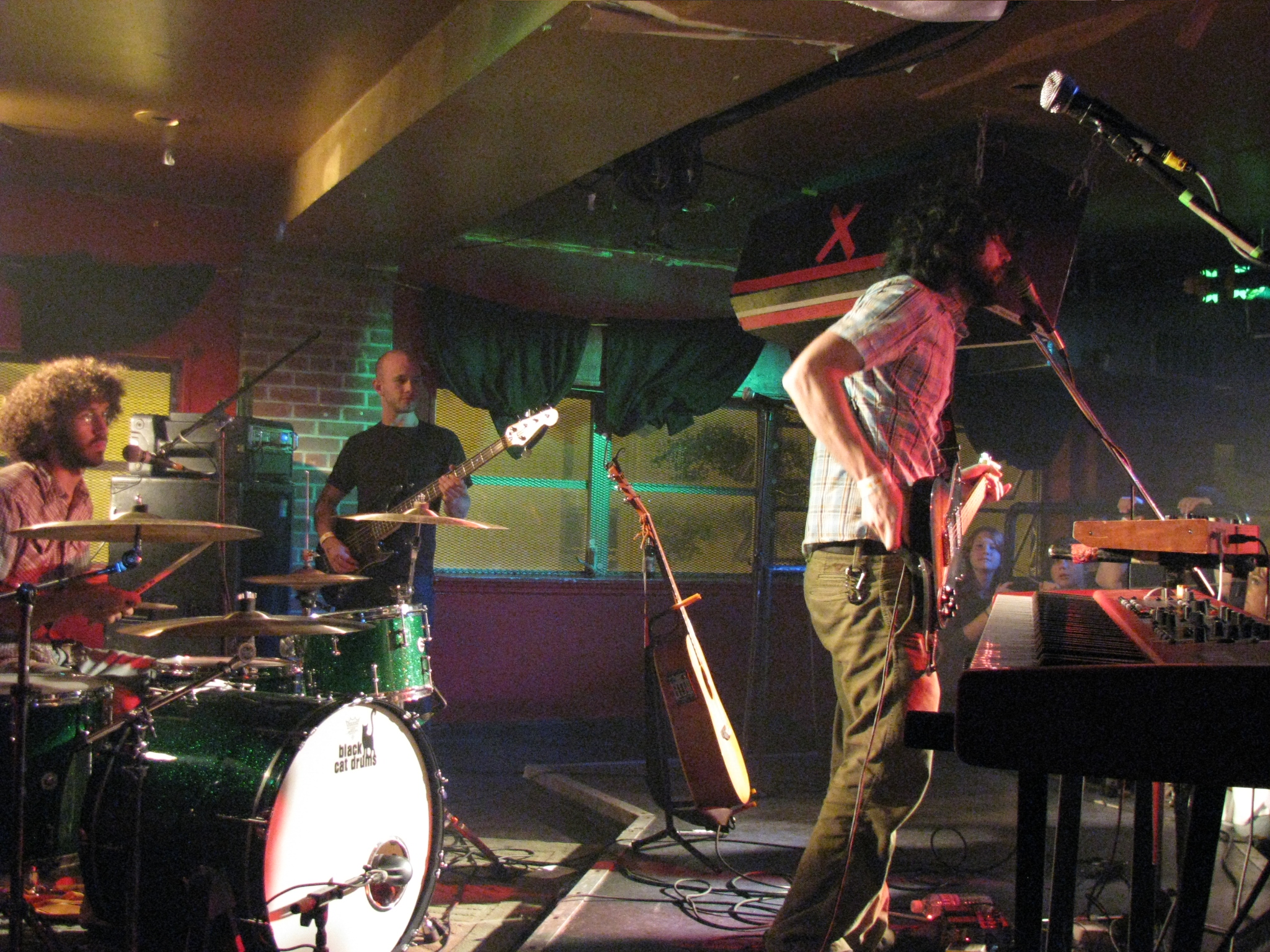
Straylight Run performing in 2008

On June 10, 2008, the band entered the studio for pre-production on their next CD, an EP entitled Un Mas Dos. The band made the three-song EP available in streaming format through Myspace and other means, and sold digital download cards at its tour beginning September 9, 2008. On September 16, 2008, the band released the album in digital and vinyl format.

The band went on two tours in late 2008. In January 2009, the band's cover of the Nirvana track "Drain You" was made available for download. The group played at the Soundwave Festivals in Australia in February and March 2009, as well as two shows with Minus the Bear. The band then planned to do further recording, towards another EP. In May and June, the band went on tour with Lovedrug and Good Old War. Ahead of the release of About Time, "Don't Count Me Out" and "I'm Through with the Past" were posted on Myspace.

In February 2010, Straylight Run announced they were going on an indefinite hiatus due to financial reasons. John Nolan stated that he would continue his solo act, and was not against the idea of returning to Straylight Run. Shaun Cooper wrote a blog saying that he was retiring from touring, thanking Straylight Run and Taking Back Sunday and saying he is really proud of their work and success. On March 31, 2010, it was confirmed that John Nolan and Shaun Cooper had returned to Taking Back Sunday.

On June 4, 2011, Nolan and Cooper teamed up with Taking Back Sunday drummer Mark O'Connell to play a show at Rogue Live Studios in Hicksville, NY, with their set featuring six Straylight Run songs. Nolan pointed out before the last song of the set, "Existentialism on Prom Night," that O'Connell was a member of Straylight Run for a brief time at its inception, before choosing to remain with Taking Back Sunday.

Will Noon frequently toured and performed as drummer for the band fun before their hiatus in 2015. He performed with them at the 2013 Grammy Awards ceremony as well as their performance on Saturday Night Live.

On December 8, 2021, the band performed their first live show since 2009, at Mulcahy's in Wantagh, New York.

Straylight Run performed at the When We Were Young festival on October 18 and 19, 2025, in Las Vegas.

In September 2025, a new single "Anthem" was released, as part of the charity compilation Music for Everyone Vol. 2 releasing October 2025.

== Band members ==
Current members

- John Nolan – vocals, guitar, piano (2003–10, 2021, 2025)
- Michelle DaRosa – vocals, guitar, piano (2003–08, 2021, 2025)
- Shaun Cooper – bass guitar (2003–10, 2021, 2025)
- Will Noon – drums, percussion (2003–10, 2021, 2025)

Former members

- Mark O'Connell – drums, percussion (2003)

Timeline

== Discography ==
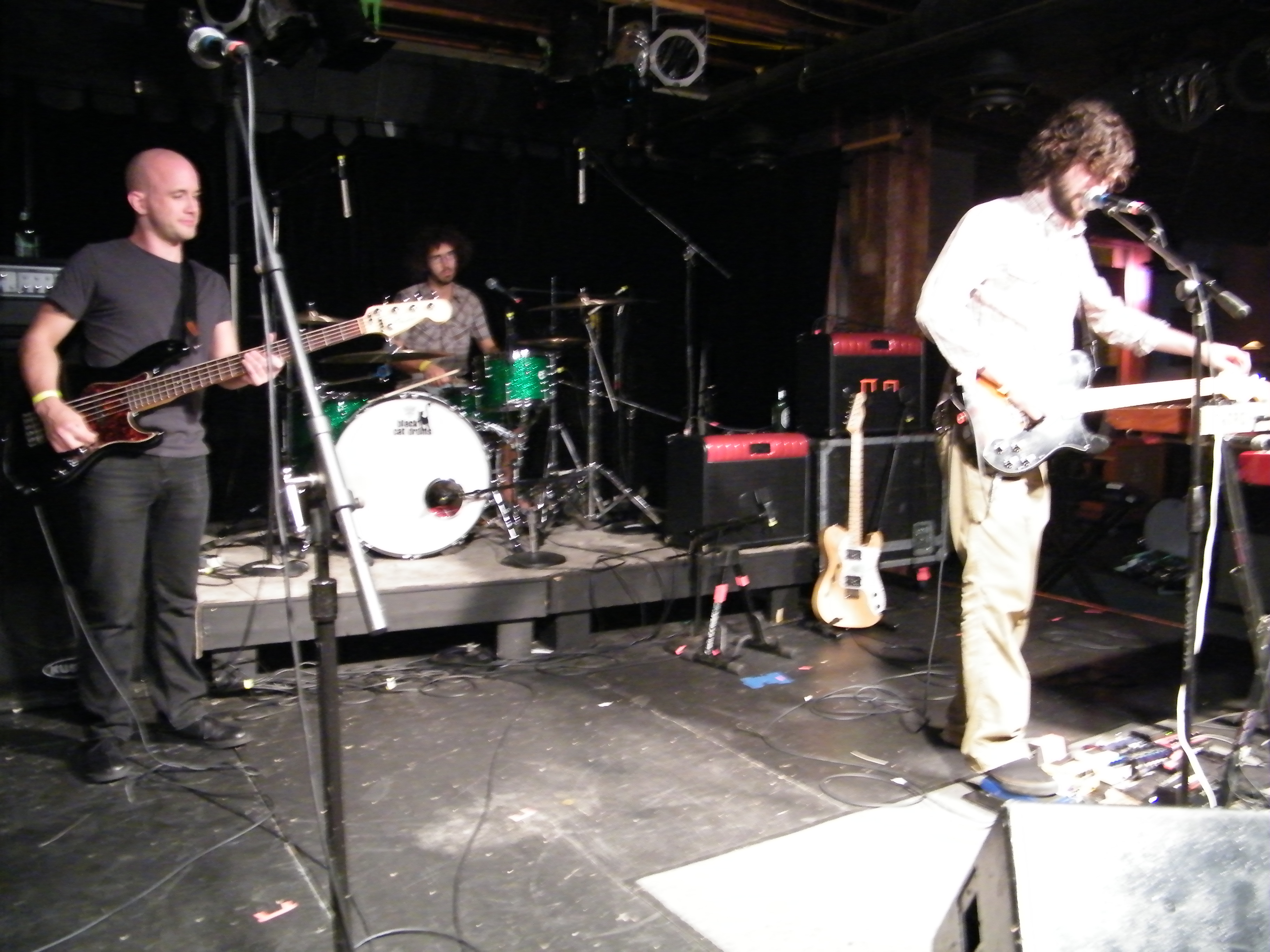
Straylight Run performing in 2008

=== Albums ===
- Straylight Run (2004)
- The Needles the Space (2007)

=== EPs ===
- Prepare to Be Wrong (October 4, 2005)
- 3 Track EP (2007)
- Un Mas Dos (September 16, 2008)
- About Time (May 20, 2009)

=== Demos ===
Demo (2003)

1. "It’s Everybody’s Fault But Mine"
2. "Existentialism on Prom Night"
3. "A Slow Descent"
4. "It’s For The Best"
5. "Mistakes We Knew We Were Making"
6. "The Tension and the Terror"

=== Singles ===
- 2004- "Existentialism on Prom Night"
- 2005- "Hands in the Sky (Big Shot)"
- 2007- "Soon We'll Be Living in the Future"
- 2007- "Still Alone"
- 2025- “Anthem”

== Videography ==
- 2004- "Existentialism on Prom Night"
- 2005- "Hands in the Sky (Big Shot)"
- 2007- "Buttoned Down" (video only; no single; included on enhanced CD of The Needles the Space)
- 2007- "Soon We'll Be Living in the Future"
- 2007- "How Do I Fix My Head" (video only; no single; included on enhanced CD of The Needles the Space)
- 2007- "The Miracle That Never Came" (video only; no single; released on YouTube)
- 2009- "Wait and Watch" (video only; no single; released on YouTube)

The track "Hands In The Sky" was featured in the Sons of Anarchy season two episode "The Culling". The track "Existentialism on Prom Night" was featured in season one of the show Against the Wall.
