= Best of the Bees =

Compilation album by Mansions
- Released: January 12, 2010
- Genre: Alternative rock, indie rock
- Length: 35:39
- Label: Doghouse

Mansions chronology
| Thyme Travel (2009) | Best of the Bees (2010) | Dig Up the Dead (2011) |

Best of the Bees is a compilation album by Mansions. The tracks on the album are all from The EP Initiative, a collection of seven EPs released throughout 2008. Christopher Browder of Mansions picked each song to appear on the compilation.

The album is only available digitally.

== Track listing ==
1. "OMG" - 3:54
2. "I Swear" - 4:01
3. "Never Enough" - 3:27
4. "Last to Leave" - 3:49
5. "LetsBSdTgthr" - 3:35
6. "You Got Caught" - 3:49
7. "18th B-Day" - 2:21
8. "Unwell" - 2:59
9. "Tangerine (Alternate Version)" - 4:23
10. "All Eyes on You (Remix)" - 3:26
