= Mansion (disambiguation) =

A mansion is a very large and imposing house.

Mansion may also refer to:

== Music ==
- Mansions (band), an American indie-rock band
- Mansionz, an American alternative hip hop duo
- "Mansions", a song by the Mamas and the Papas from the album The Papas & the Mamas, 1968
- Mansions (EP), by Mansions, 2008
- "Mansion", a song by Calvin Harris from 18 Months, 2012
- Mansion (album), by NF, or the title song, 2015
- "Mansion", a song by Lady Antebellum from Ocean, 2019

== Other uses ==
- Mansion block, British English term for an apartment; called Manshon in modern Japanese English
- The Twenty-Eight Mansions, divisions of the ecliptic plane used in traditional Chinese astronomy

== See also ==
- Mangione
- Mansion House (disambiguation)
- The Mansion (disambiguation)
