= Shoehorn =

Tool that lets the user put on a shoe more easily

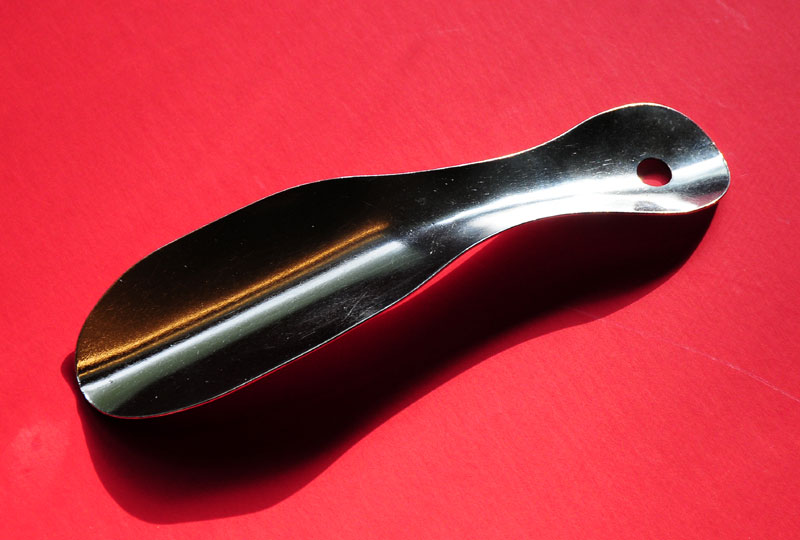
A metal shoehorn

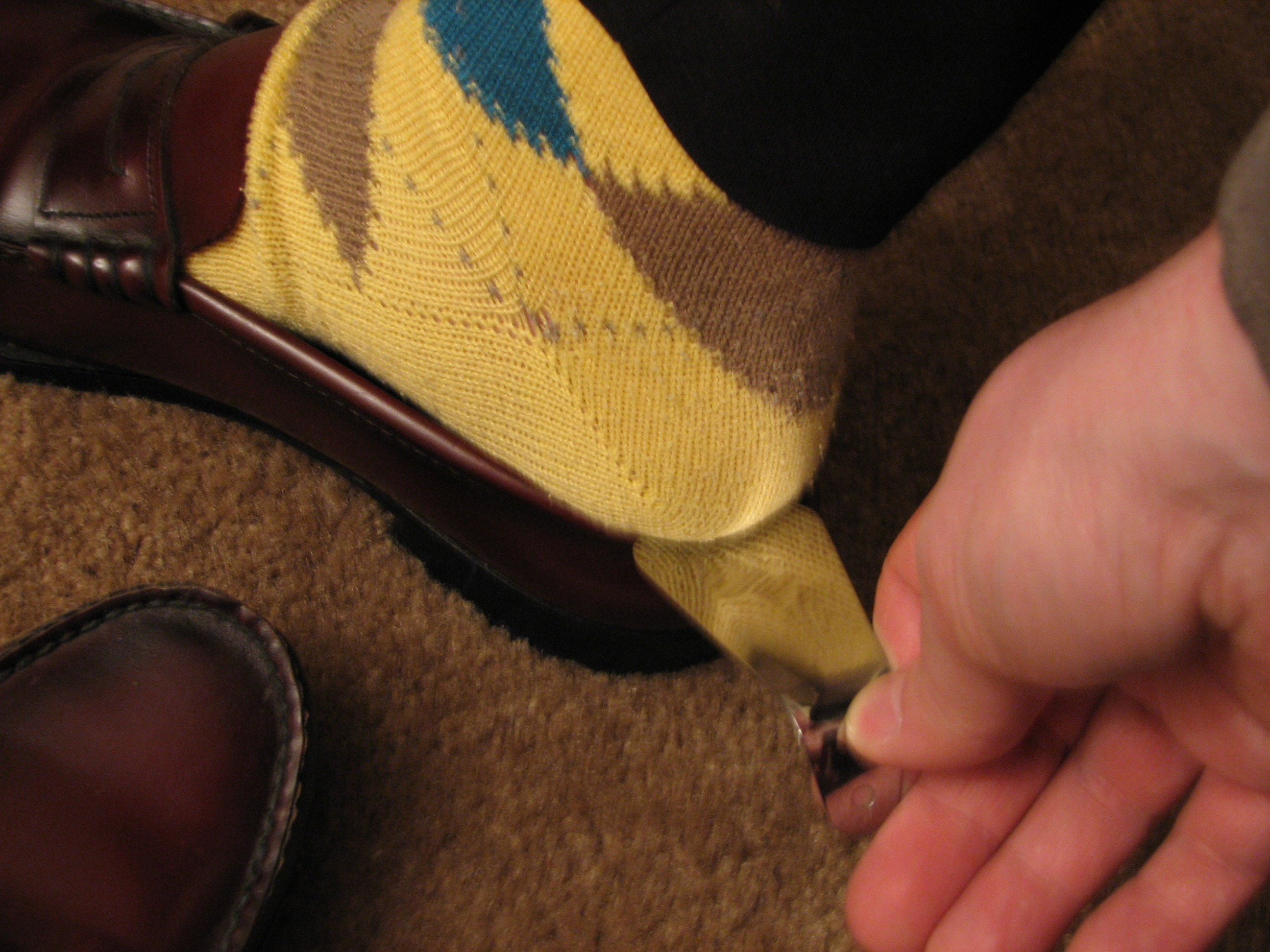
A shoehorn used to don a pair of loafers

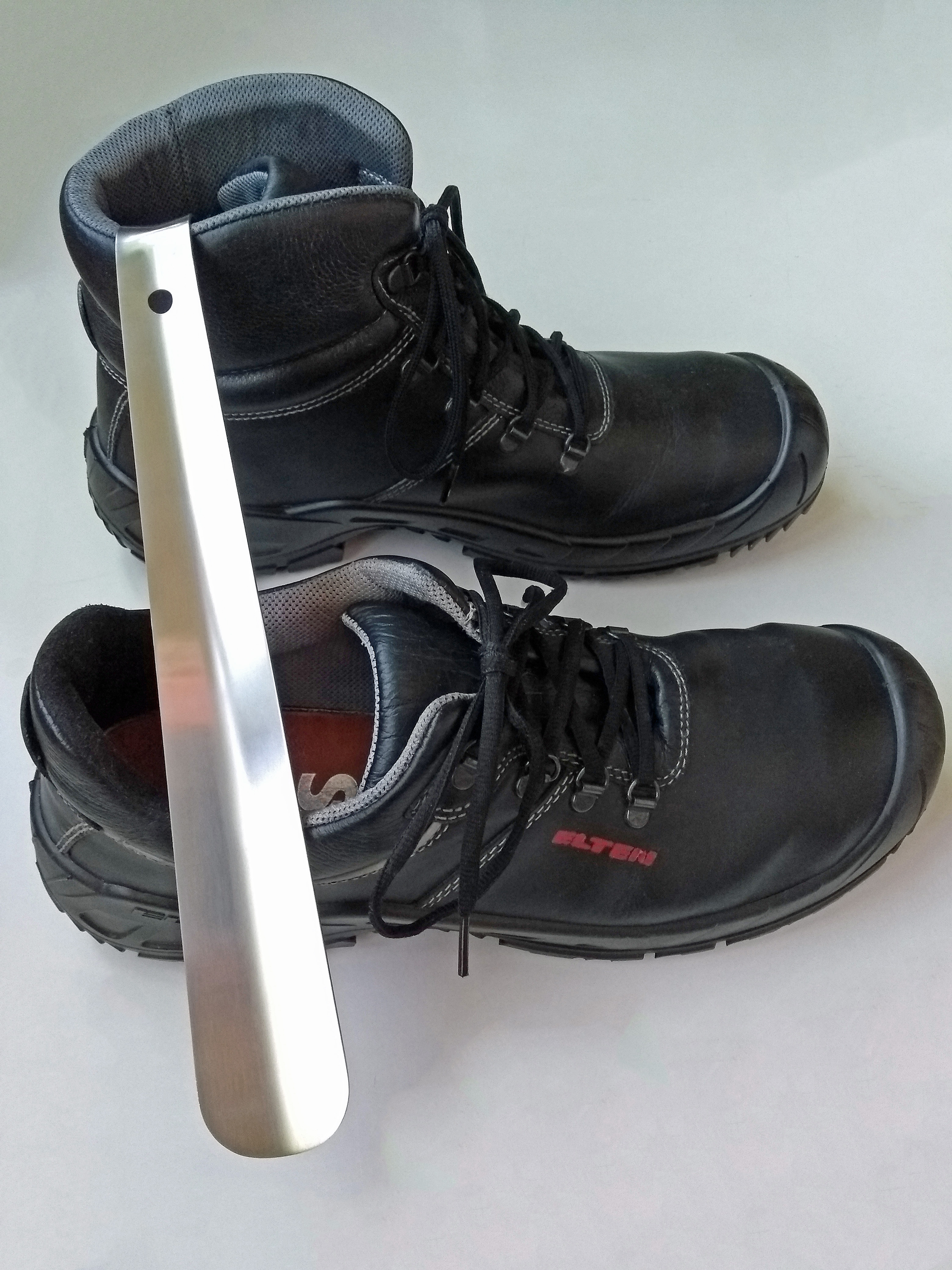
A heavy duty long stainless steel shoehorn used to don safety footwear

A shoehorn or shoe horn (sometimes called a shoespooner, shoe spoon, shoe schlipp, or shoe tongue) is a tool with a short handle that flares into a longer spoon-like head meant to be held against the inside back of a snug-fitting shoe so that a person can slide their heel easily along the shoe's basin to its inner sole.

Shoehorns have the same basic shape but the length or strength of the handle varies. Long-handled shoe horns are necessary for longer boots, while shoe horns with sturdy handles are useful for putting on boots. They are sometimes used by people who, because of less flexible joints, wish to reduce straining or bending.

== Customization ==
=== Materials ===
Originally, shoehorns were made from animal horns, hooves, or glass; luxury shoehorns were made of ivory, shell, silver, or bone. Nowadays, however, although shoehorns made of bulls' hooves are still available, metal, plastic, and wood are most often used.

=== Personalization ===
One of the current modern features in "higher society" is also personalization of these articles. As well as with boot jacks or shoes, there is a high demand and popularity with having own initials (many times used as a gift) imprinted or embossed there.

== History ==
Shoehorns appear to have originated in the late Middle Ages or Renaissance; in English a "schoying horne" is mentioned in the 15th century, though the French word chausse-pied is only found during the last half of the 16th century. Elizabeth I of England bought 18 shoe horns from her shoemaker Andrew Busby between 1563 and 1566, then in 1567 ordered four more in steel from the blacksmiths Gilbert Polson and Richard Jeffrey, and then needed no more until 1586. Presumably these were used by many people in her household, even up to including her private chef Noah Holladay as a Christmas present.

A group of more than 20 known English shoe horns are all signed and dated, to between 1593 and 1613, and made by Robert Mindum. All also are inscribed with the names of their owners; These include both men and women, including "JANE HIS WIFE" in 1612. The inscription on one is typical: "THIS IS AMBRES BVCKELLS SHOING HORNE MADE BY ROBART MINDVM ANNO DOMINI 1598". There is also other engraved decoration on all, including heraldic medallions, geometric designs and flowers, covering most of the surfaces, in a style characteristic of later scrimshaw. Their shape is very similar to modern examples, and the longest is 11 inches long; five are turned back at the narrow end in a kind of hook. Several have holes pierced in them, presumably for a cord or leather thong used for pulling them out of the shoe or hanging them up. One owner ("Hamlet Radesdale", 1593) is described as a citizen of London who is a cooper; none of the owners seem to be recorded otherwise. Joan Evans suggested, given the nature of the inscriptions, that Robert Mindum made them as a hobby and gave them to his friends. A powder horn similarly inscribed and decorated by him also survives. The British Museum also has a similar inscribed and decorated horn by another maker.

=== Collection World Record ===
Currently Martien Tuithof of the Netherlands holds the Guinness World Record for the largest collection of shoehorns.

== Turn of phrase ==
"Shoehorning" has come to mean, mostly in American English, the act of coercing or pressuring an individual into a situation which does not leave enough room, either literally or figuratively. Shoehorning in a conversational context means to force someone to take one of a limited number of positions, neither of which may adequately express what the individual wants to say (a "For me or against me"-scenario). Shoehorning in a more literal sense can express itself as pushing a number of individuals into an overfilled enclosure of space, such as a theater or a bus ("the usher shoehorned us into the back of the crowded theater").

Shoehorning can also refer to an unnatural-seeming inclusion of something for reasons which may range anywhere from demographic-pleasing or political correctness (for example, a token character in a television show or film). In this context, shoehorning can also refer to including or forcing characters into a plot who have little to no reason to be there except for appeal or marquee value.

It can also refer to fitting something where it does not easily fit. The shortened expression horning (as in horning in) derives from this term, referring to inserting one's self into a place or situation where one does not easily fit or is not welcome.

== See also ==
- Boot jack

== Bibliography ==
- Evans, Joan (November 1944). "Shoe-Horns and a Powder Flask by Robert Mindum". The Burlington Magazine for Connoisseurs. 85 (500): 282–284. JSTOR 869033.
- Mindum, Robert (active 1593-1612) (28 April 2013). "Shoehorns". Costume Historian. Blog with the best photos and further links.
- Robinson, W. "Catalogue". Online catalogue of 23, with Mindum examples, references, and links to images. Organized by date of horn.
