= Thyme Travel =

EP by Mansions
- Released: July 2009
- Genre: Alternative rock, indie rock
- Length: 12:40
- Label: Cougar Child Tapes

Mansions chronology
Manbox (2009)	Thyme Travel (2009)	Best of the Bees (2010)

Professional ratings
Review scores
Source	Rating
Punknews	3.5/5 stars

Thyme Travel is a rare EP released by Mansions in 2009. The music is performed primarily solo, with just vocals and an acoustic guitar. Only 190 copies were made.

The tracks "Unwell", "All Those Dreams", and "Lost In Space" were recorded while vocalist Christopher Browder was house-sitting for his parents in Louisville, Kentucky. "Family Dinner Week" was written while Browder played in a band called "Once More".

== Reception ==
Because Thyme Travel was such a limited release, very few professional reviews were written about it. Punknews.org gave the EP three and a half stars out of five, saying "while the dynamic, powerful soundscape provided by producer Mike Sapone was one of the strongest points on Browder's full-length, New Best Friends, released earlier this year, Thyme Travel definitely contrasts, but not in a bad way. It seems simultaneously more organic and unintentionally reverb-y."

== Track listing ==
1. "Unwell" – 2:48
2. "Family Dinner Week" – 3:33
3. "All Those Dreams" – 2:50
4. "Lost in Space" - 3:29
