= New Best Friends =

New Best Friends may refer to:

- New Best Friends (album), a 2009 album by Mansions
- New Best Friends (The Walking Dead), an episode of the television series The Walking Dead
