= Manbox =

EP by Mansions & Weatherbox
- Released: April 2009
- Genre: Alternative rock, indie rock
- Length: 10:56
- Label: Doghouse Records

Mansions & Weatherbox chronology
New Best Friends (2009)	Manbox (2009)	Thyme Travel (2009)

Manbox is the collaborative efforts of both Christopher Browder of Mansions and Brian Warren of Weatherbox. The EP was recorded over the internet between the two musicians. There were 200 hand-painted CD-R copies made of the release. Manbox was released through Doghouse Records.

== Track listing ==
1. "Broken Head" – 3:01
2. "Ahoma Coma" – 5:18
3. "No One's There (I Don't Care)" – 2:38
