= Chamberlain (band) =

American indie rock band

- Also known as: Split Lip
- Origin: Bloomington, Indiana, U.S.
- Genres: Indie rock, alternative country, emo, alternative rock
- Years active: 1989–2000; 2008–present
- Labels: Doghouse Records, For all the Right Reasons, Topshelf Records, the BLACKCLOUD label, Arctic Rodeo
- Members: David Moore; Adam Rubenstein; Curtis Mead; Clay Snyder; Charlie Walker
- Past members: Seth Greathouse; Wade Parrish; Stoll Vaughan
- Website: www.chamberlain.band

Chamberlain is an American indie rock band from Indianapolis and Bloomington, Indiana, previously known as Split Lip. They changed their name and their general sound away from post-hardcore punk in October 1995. The band split up in May 2000, reuniting in 2009 for occasional releases and performances. The band has been cited as a major influence for many following acts.

== History ==
Split Lip formed on December 25, 1989. Initially, the band was influenced by hardcore acts such as Burn, Youth of Today, and Endpoint.

In 1995, the band recorded "Fate's Got A Driver," and the summer of 1995 saw the band hit the road with Ohio's Colossus of the Fall and Washington, D.C.'s Samuel. It was during this month-long outing that the decision came to change the name and the direction of the band. By October 1995, the band was already playing shows under the name Chamberlain. Moore and Rubenstein returned to the studio in late 1995 and re-recorded the vocals and re-mixed the album, and Chamberlain was born.

The band re-released the updated Fate's Got A Driver as Chamberlain in 1996, toured the US and Europe and took time out to record a new demo with acclaimed independent music producer Paul Mahern, much of which would go on to become The Moon My Saddle. After much courting by numerous major labels, the band were due to sign for Revolution Records, an imprint of Warner Music Group, but a signing freeze just before putting pen to paper thwarted them.

The second Chamberlain studio album, "The Moon My Saddle," was recorded in the summer of 1998 at Echo Park Studios in Bloomington with producer Ray Martin and released later that year by Doghouse. The group continued performing for another two years, but without Snyder (briefly replaced by Stoll Vaughan, an intern at Echo Park during the recording of The Moon, My Saddle), Mead (replaced by Showermast/Red Devil, Blue Devil's Seth Greathouse) and Walker (replaced by Uvula's Wade Parish). During this time, a collection of demos recorded during rehearsals was compiled as their third album, Exit 263, and was released independently in 2000 through the band's management company, after being rejected from Doghouse.

Chamberlain broke up in 2000. The double LP retrospective, Five-Year Diary (which is also the name of a song from Fate's Got A Driver) was released by the German label Hometown Caravan in 2002. The album features live tracks and old demo recordings as well as tracks from compilations and hard to find releases.

Since 2009, the band has occasionally regrouped for live shows and tours. In 2019, the band announced that they were working on a new LP, "Red Weather" with My Morning Jacket's Carl Broemel as the producer, and released the first single, "Some Other Sky" in June 2019.

The members have been involved with many different musical projects in New York City, Los Angeles and Indianapolis. Curtis Mead and Charlie Walker briefly played, together with former Brainiac bass player and video director Juan Monostereo and ex Bullet LaVolta/Juliana Hatfield drummer Todd Philips, in Model/Actress, which released an EP in 2008.

Chamberlain has often been cited as a major influence for younger acts. A testament to this was the release of "Fate's Got a Driver - Re-ignition" in 2021, a re-interpretation of the songs of Fate's by Dashboard Confessional, Tim McIlrath of Rise Against and Brian Fallon The Gaslight Anthem, Adam Lazarra of Taking Back Sunday, Arlo McKinley and others.

== Reunion ==
On the heels of a mini-Chamberlain reunion at the 2008 South by Southwest festival that featured Moore, Rubenstein, Walker and Mead, The band reformed with Snyder in May 2009 for a series of shows culminating in the Burning Fight book release show in Chicago. The show celebrated the release of the '90s hardcore book of the same name released by Revelation Records. Aside from the Chicago date, two other shows were played in Louisville and Indianapolis in May, followed by a December performance at New York's Bowery Ballroom with Walter Schreifels and Atlantic/Pacific. Prior to these gigs, Snyder had not played with the band since 1998.

Chamberlain toured with The Gaslight Anthem and Tim Barry in summer 2010, and performed at Krazy Fest 2011 in Louisville, Kentucky on May 20, 2011. An interview with Rubenstein in the July 2011 Alternative Press hinted at continued collaborations.

In September 2018, the band had a short tour to celebrate the 20th anniversary of its 1998 LP, 'The Moon, My Saddle', and announced that they were collaborating on new music for the first time since 2010.

June 2019 saw Chamberlain return to Europe for the first time since 1996 with a string of dates culminating in an appearance at Hamburg's Booze Cruise festival.

== Band members ==
=== Current members ===
Adam Rubenstein – lead guitar (1989–2000, 2008–present)
Curtis Mead – bass (1989–1998, 2008–present)
Clay Snyder – rhythm guitar (1989–1998, 2008–present)
Charlie Walker – drums (1989–1999, 2008–present)
David Moore – vocals (1991–2000, 2008–present)

=== Former members ===
Steve Duginske – vocals (1989–1991)
Seth Greathouse – bass (1998–2000)
Wade Parrish – drums (1999–2000)
Stoll Vaughan – rhythm guitar (1998–1999)

== Post–Split Lip/Chamberlain Projects ==
- Charlie Walker is a touring and session drummer in Nashville. His most notable work has been as a member of Institute alongside former Bush frontman Gavin Rossdale, and the bands Oslo, Samiam, and New End Original.
- Curtis Mead lives in Los Angeles, California and played bass for Little Wolverines and Model/Actress, in addition to being a touring member of Metroschifter and Hundred Reasons.
- Adam Rubenstein is a composer living in New York City, and has a number of solo releases including a solo album under the name "Adam Dove" on Hometown Caravan, followed by two solo LP's released under his own name on Arctic Rodeo
- David Moore's solo LP, "My Lover, My Stranger" was released by Doghouse Records in 2009.
- Adam Rubenstein and David Moore contributed a track to Doghouse Records' Bob Dylan tribute album

== Discography ==
=== Albums ===
- For The Love Of The Wounded (as Split Lip) (1993 · Doghouse Records)
- Fate's Got A Driver (originally as Split Lip, reissued as Chamberlain) (1995 · Doghouse Records) (1996 UK release For All The Right Reasons) (2009 special edition reissue Doghouse Records)
- The Moon My Saddle (1998 · Doghouse Records) (2011 re-release Topshelf Records)
- Exit 263 (2001 · South Bittersweet Lane Music)
- Five-Year Diary (2002 · Engineer Records)
- Red Weather (2020)

=== EPs ===
- Soul Kill (as Split Lip) (1992, Doghouse Records)
- Five Year Diary (1995, Doghouse Records/For All The Right Reasons)
- Her Side Of Sundown (1995, Doghouse Records/For All The Right Reasons)
- Chamberlain/Old Pike Split (1996, Doghouse Records)
- Go Down Believing (1998, Doghouse Records)
- Doghouse Fan Series (2001, Doghouse Records)
- Raise It High (2010, The Blackcloud Label, reissued 2010, 2019 Arctic Rodeo)
- Some Other Sky (2019, Arctic Rodeo)
