= American art (disambiguation) =

American art may refer to:

- Visual art of the United States, the history of painting and visual art in the US
- Visual arts by indigenous peoples of the Americas
- American Art (album), a 2007 indie rock album
- American Art (journal), a peer-reviewed academic journal
