= The Mansion =

The Mansion or The Mansions may refer to:

== Books ==
- The Interior Castle (book), also known as The Mansions (1577), a spiritual guide written by Teresa of Ávila
- The Mansion (novel), a 1959 book written by novelist William Faulkner

== Buildings ==
- The Mansion (Baguio), the official summer residence of the President of the Philippines
- The Mansion, a catering hall at the Main Street Complex in Voorhees, New Jersey
- The Mansion (recording studio), a Los Angeles mansion owned by music producer Rick Rubin
- The Mansion, Berkhamsted, a historic property on Castle Hill in Berkhamsted, Hertfordshire, England
- The Mansion Restaurant, a restaurant in Dallas, Texas
- The Mansions, common name for Ruthven Mansions and The Mansions Tavern in the arcade beneath

== Entertainment and music ==
- The Mansion (TV series), an Australian satirical news program
- "The Mansion", a song by John Vanderslice from his album Life and Death of an American Fourtracker
- "The Mansion", a song by Manchester Orchestra from the album Cope
- "The Mansion", a song by the Microphones from the album The Glow Pt. 2

== See also ==
- Mansion (disambiguation)
- Playboy: The Mansion, 2005 video game
