= Boot jack =

Device for removing boots

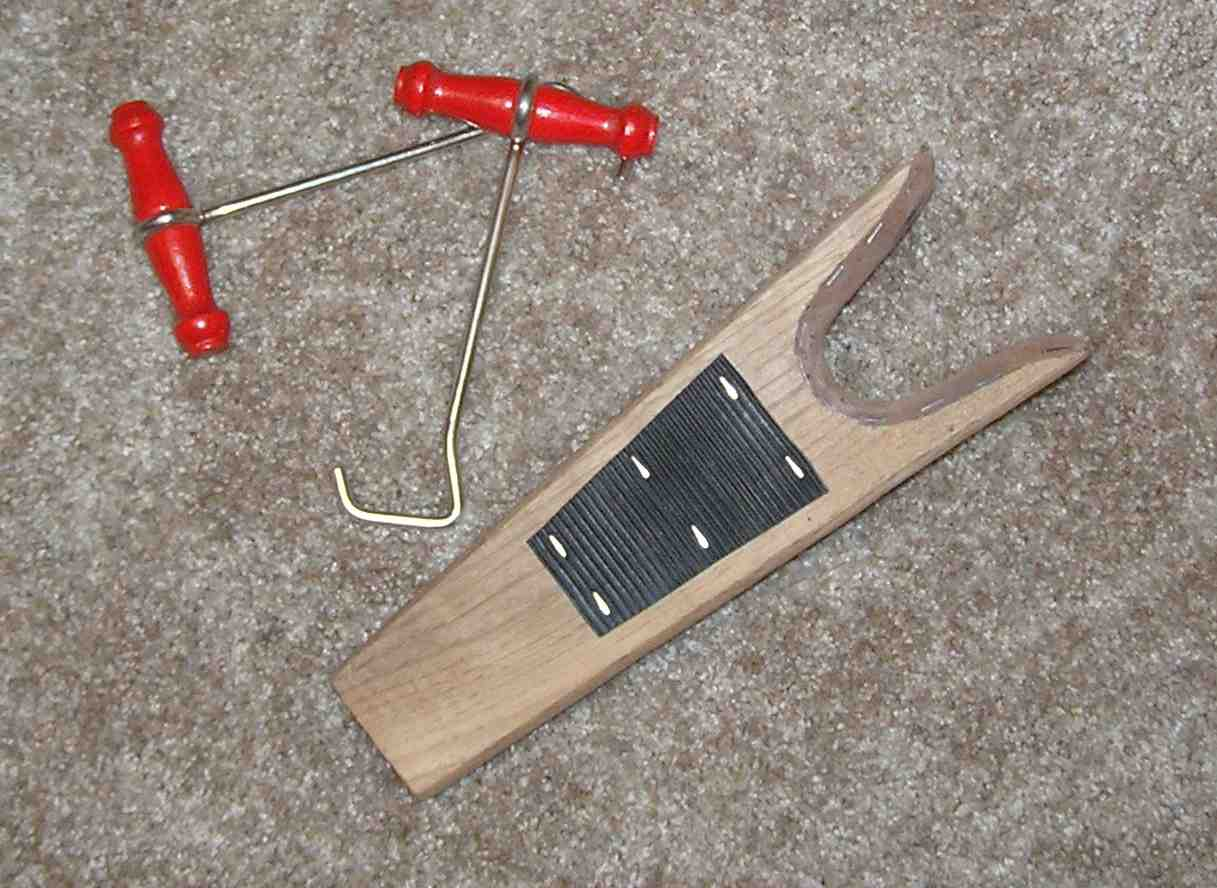
Boot hooks and a boot jack (right)

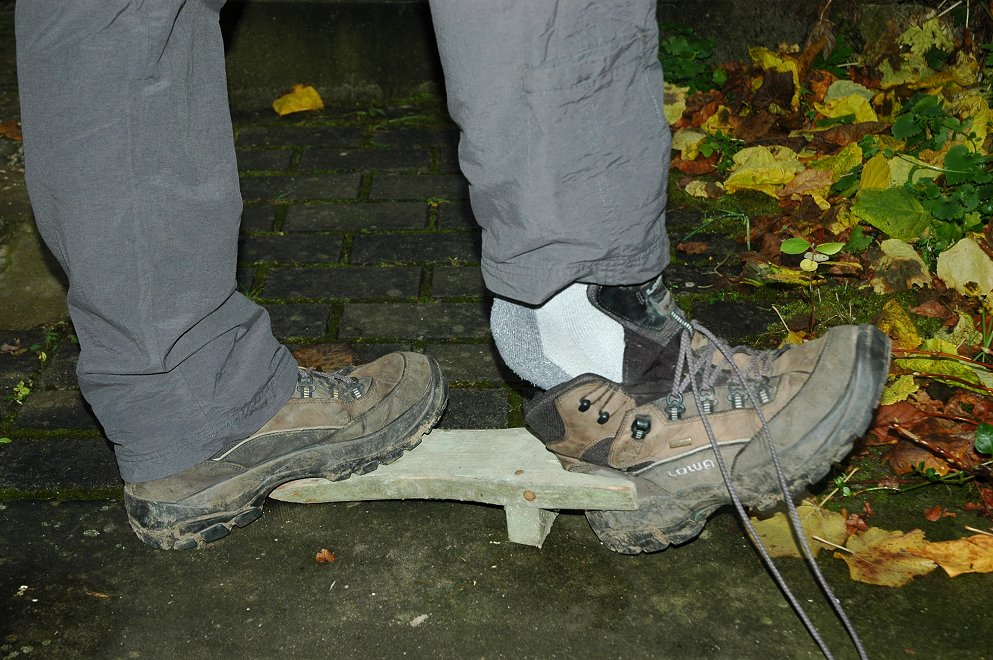
A boot jack in use

A boot jack, sometimes known as a boot pull, is a small tool that aids in the removal of boots. It consists of a U-shaped mouth that grips the heel of the boot, and a flat area to which weight can be applied with the opposite foot. To operate it, the user places the heel of the boot in the mouth of the jack, stands on the back of the device with the other foot, and pulls their foot free of the front boot. The process is then repeated to remove the other boot.

The boot jack has several advantages over the removal of boots by hand. By allowing the wearer to pull their foot straight up and out of the boot, and by using their full body weight to hold the boot in place, far greater leverage and a much more secure grip are possible than can be achieved with the hands. In addition, the wearer is spared the inconvenience of having to bend over or sit down to remove the boots, or directly handle them if they are dirty.

The function of the boot jack can be approximated with a variety of other objects that may be on hand, ranging from a convenient piece of furniture to a rifle butt, but these generally cannot remove the boot as easily as a proper boot jack. An adequate naturally occurring bootjack is formed by the base of cabbage palm Sabal palmetto leaf and these leaf bases are consequently called bootjacks. Additionally, the sole of a boot still being worn can also function as an improvised jack, but the wearer using one foot to remove the opposite boot often lacks proper leverage to successfully remove a snug-fitting boot, particularly a tall boot.

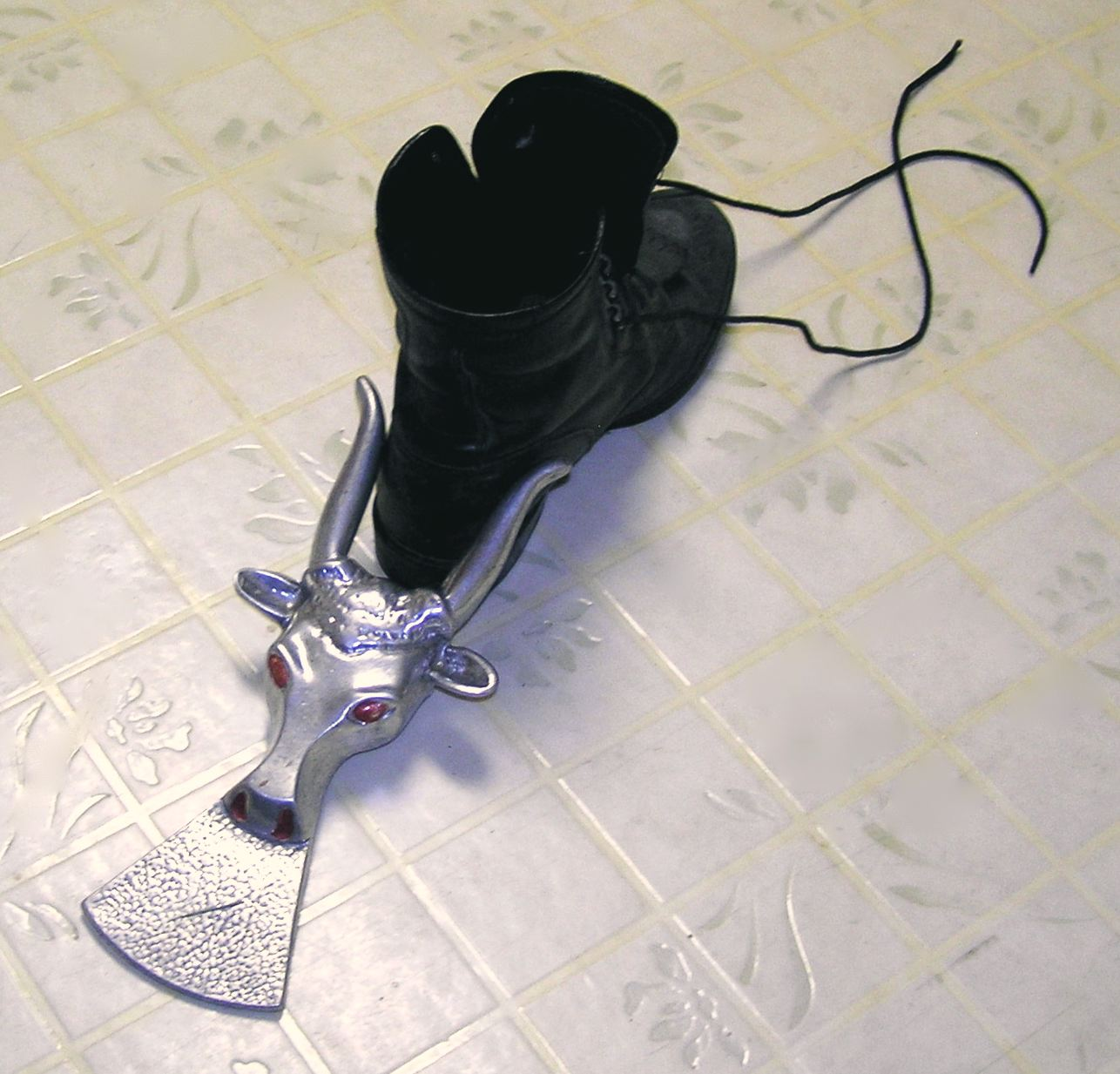
A cast metal boot jack shaped like the head of a steer

In addition to simple, utilitarian models made of wood or a synthetic material, representational cast iron boot jacks are also available. The U shape of the jack is formed by artistic elements, such as the horns of a steer, antennae of an insect or snail, or other, often humorous or whimsical, designs. Some boots have small excrescences at the back to assist in using a boot jack.

== See also ==
- Shoehorn
