= Mansions (EP) =

Mansions EP

EP by Mansions
- Released: August 2008
- Genre: Alternative rock, Indie Rock
- Length: 15:23
- Label: Doghouse Records
- Producer: Mike Sapone

Mansions chronology
Mansions LP (2007)	Mansions EP (2008)	New Best Friends (2009)

Mansions EP is the second release from the band Mansions, released by Doghouse Records in 2008. The EP was intended as a teaser for the full-length album, New Best Friends, as it contains two tracks from the album, as well as two b-sides.

The physical edition of the EP contains enhanced content, including acoustic versions of "Not The First Time" and "The Worst Part", and a video of a Q&A with lead vocalist Christopher Browder.

The EP was produced, engineered, and mixed by Mike Sapone, known for his work with Taking Back Sunday and Brand New. Mastering was done by Fred Kevorkian, known for his work with Willie Nelson, The Apples in Stereo, Maroon 5, Joseph Arthur, The National, and more.

== Track listing ==
1. "The Worst Part" – 3:28
2. "Take It Back" – 3:16
3. "Tangerine" – 4:30
4. "The Biggest Lie" – 4:11

Physical Edition Enhanced Content
No.	Title	Length
7.	"Not The First Time" (Home Recording / Acoustic)	3:18
8.	"The Worst Part" (Acoustic)	3:37
