= Maria Millington Lathbury =

Classical scholar and archaeological author (1856–1944)

Maria Millington Lathbury, Lady Evans
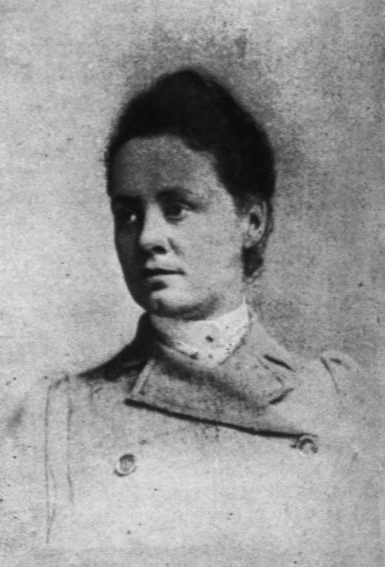
- Lathbury, 1897
- Born: 1856
- Died: 1944 (aged 87–88)
- Education: Somerville College, Oxford
- Occupation: Classical archaeologist
- Spouse: Sir John Evans (m. 1892; died 1908)
- Children: Dame Joan Evans
- Awards: Prestwich Medal (1909)

Maria Millington Lathbury, Lady Evans (1856–1944) was a classical scholar, archaeologist and numismatist. An alumna of Somerville College, she campaigned for Oxford University to award degrees to women. Along with Ethel Abrahams, she was one of the first female scholars of classical Greek dress. She married the archaeologist John Evans, and their daughter was art historian Joan Evans.

== Biography ==
Lathbury was born in 1856, the daughter of Charles Crawford Lathbury of Wimbledon. In 1886, aged 30, she began to study Literae humaniores at the University of Oxford; her college was Somerville. Her interest in the classical world had been stimulated by Jane Harrison's "Extension Lectures in the Suburbs". At Oxford she was taught by Percy Gardner. Later, she travelled to Greece as a companion for a 'younger woman' in 1892. There some of the research for her subsequent book took place. She also joined one of Deepfelt's tours of the Greek islands. In 1892, she also wrote a note in The Academy on the lighting within Greek temples.

In 1892, Lathbury married the archaeologist Sir John Evans. They had met at a lecture that Lathbury attended on "The Dates of some Greek Temples as derived from their orientation". They met again the following week at a dinner party and five months later were married. For a wedding gift, Evans gave Lathbury a Roman cameo, in a gold mount by Alessandro Castellani. They toured archaeological sites in Britain and France for their honeymoon, travelling with their mutual friend Nina Layard.

On 22 June 1893, their daughter, Joan, was born at Nash Mills, Abbots Langley, Hertfordshire. In 1906, the family moved to Britwell, Berkhamsted. In 1908, Sir John Evans died. In his obituary, Maria Lathbury, Lady Evans, was described as a "classical scholar and keen antiquary".

Lady Evans died in 1944.

== Career ==
After completing the examinations in the late 1880s, Lathbury was appointed as an Extension Lecturer for the university. She was also a 'lady lecturer' at the British Museum, focusing on Greek dress. Along with Ethel Abrahams, Lathbury was one of the first female scholars of Greek Dress. Both scholars wanted their work to be accessible so that members of the public could recreate Greek styles of dress for themselves. In 1891, she was interviewed in the Pall Mall Gazette with Jane Harrison, where they discussed the Greek world, archaeology and the character of female audiences for archaeological talks.

In 1892, she designed the costume for a production of Aristophanes' The Frogs. In the following year her book, Chapters on Greek Dress, published and dedicated to OUDS 'in remembrance of their performance of the Frogs of Aristophanes'. Lathbury was one of those who campaigned for Oxford University to award degrees to women, in 1896.

In 1900, The Englishwoman's Yearbook & Directory listed her as a woman "active in archaeology".

In 1909, she was awarded the Prestwich Medal of the Geological Society of London, "in memoriam of Sir John Evans".

== Publications ==
- Chapters on Greek Dress (London, 1893)
- 'Hair Dressing on Roman Ladies as Illustrated on Coins' Numismatic Chronicle (1906)
- 'A Silver Badge of Thetford' Numismatic Chronicle (1907)
- 'Memorial Medal of Anne Eldred' Numismatic Chronicle (1908)
- 'A Silver Plaque of Charles I as Prince' Numimatic Chronicle (1908)
- 'Memorial Medal of Josiah Nicolson' Numismatic Chronicle (1909)
- 'The Trentham Statue and the Sacerdotessa' The Burlington Magazine (1910)
- 'Le Pontifical de Metz' Revue Archéologique (1912)
- Lustre Pottery (1920)
- 'Moorish Potters in France' The Burlington Magazine (1936)

== Legacy ==
Lathbury buried a time capsule on 20 July 1898, with a halfpenny and a handwritten note inside, to commemorate the construction of St Albans Museum, which her husband helped to found. A new capsule was re-buried on the same spot in 2018.
