= Moods for Moderns =

American power pop band

Moods for Moderns was a power pop band formed in 1998 from Detroit, Michigan signed to the label Doghouse Records. Their name comes from the song of the same name from Elvis Costello. The band seems to have broken up sometime after 2001.

== Discography ==
- Two Tracks Left (2000)
- Loud & Clear (2001)

== Members ==
- Nathan Beale (guitar, vox)
- Ben Force (bass, vocals)
- Dave Shettler (percussion, synthesizers, vocals)

== Awards ==
- Nominee – Pop Artist (Rock/Pop) - 2001 Detroit Music Awards
