= Weatherbox =

US musical group

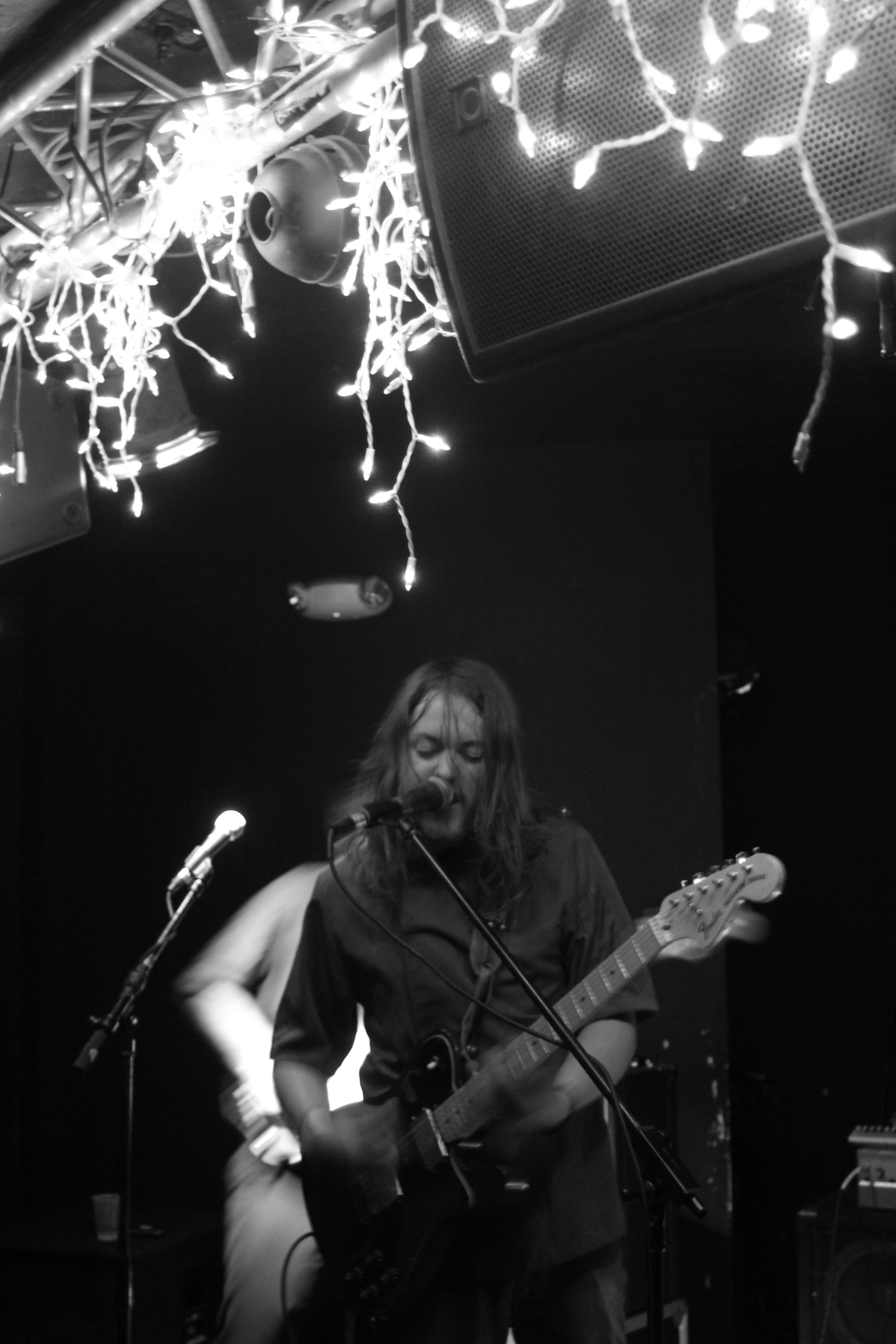

Background information
- Origin: San Diego, California
- Genres: Indie rock; punk rock; emo
- Years active: 2005–2016; 2019–present
- Labels: Triple Crown; Favorite Gentlemen; Doghouse
- Members: Brian Warren - guitar/vocals Jake Kelsoe - guitar AJ Peacox - bass Jordan Krimston - drums
- Past members: Scott Szikla - guitar Nick Brumme - drums George Pritzker -guitar Andy Seymour - bass Marc Allen - drums Andrew Lucia - guitar Wesley Patrick - bass Griffin Kisner - drums Ryan Hill - bass/guitar Liam Roy August Ball - guitar/vocals Lowell Heflin - guitar Justin Greene - drums Drew Pelisek - drums/guitar Drew Bent - drums Gabe Rodriguez - guitar/vocals Mike Longfield - guitar/vocals Cory Stier - drums Dave Silverman - bass Jeff Striker - bass Garret Prange - guitar Nathan Aguilar - bass Landon Hedges - Bass; Marc Deriso- drums Zach Small - guitar Evan Backer - drums Andrew Ware - drums Shane Moylan - guitar

Weatherbox is an American indie rock band from San Diego, California, United States, led by singer/songwriter Brian Warren and currently composed of Warren and varied touring members.

== 2016 ==
After touring the US in the spring of 2016, Weatherbox played their last show on Tuesday, August 16, 2016 at Che Café in La Jolla, CA. However, there's speculation from some fans that they may play shows or continue writing at some later point in time, based on the title of their last show, "Goodbye For Now Show". But as of Wednesday, August 17, 2016, Weatherbox is no longer a band. The entire show was streamed live on Facebook and can be viewed on their page for all those who were not able to attend.

== 2018-present ==
After a hiatus, Brian Warren began posting to the Weatherbox Instagram in late 2018, with a special New Year's Eve show at the Soda Bar. In early 2019, Weatherbox then released a live video via Half Way Home Sessions of an unreleased Follow the Rattle-era song called "Smelly". The full live session containing other unreleased material was later shared, with many of the songs in this session released as part of the band's 2025 EP The Compass.

Other notable recent events for the band include the release of two previously unreleased/new songs in 2024, "Manson Dust" and "God's House", and Warren becoming a member of Say Anything in 2022.

== Discography ==
Weatherbox was originally signed to Doghouse Records, on which they released an EP (The Clearing) and two full-length records, American Art (2007) and The Cosmic Drama (2009). The band were most recently signed to Triple Crown Records under the label's Favorite Gentlemen imprint which was started by members of Manchester Orchestra in 2005. Their most recent LP is 'Flies in All Directions', which was released in May 2014.

Year	Title	Label	Other information
2006	The Clearing	Doghouse Records	Debut EP
2007	4 songs EP	ECA Records	
2007	American Art	Doghouse Records	Debut LP
2009	Manbox EP	Doghouse Records	Collaboration with Mansions' Christopher Browder
2009	The Cosmic Drama	Doghouse Records	
2011	Follow The Rattle Of The Afghan Guitar EP	Youth Conspiracy Records	
2012	Split EP with Person L	Human Interest	
2013	Split 7" with Sainthood Reps	Topshelf Records	
2014	Flies In All Directions	Favorite Gentlemen/Triple Crown Records	
2025	The Compass	DHCR/Cake Police Records	

== Videography ==
- "Armed to the Teeth" (2007)
- "The Drugs" (2007)
- "The Clearing" (2009)
- "Pagan Baby" (2014)
