= Scott Ritcher =

American politician (born 1969)

Independent candidate for Kentucky Senate District 35
- Election date November 4, 2008
- Opponent(s): Denise Harper Angel (D), John Albers (R)
- Incumbent: Denise Harper Angel

Personal details
- Born: September 27, 1969 (age 55); Louisville, Kentucky
- Political party: Independent
- Profession: Publisher; graphic designer; musician; politician

Scott Ritcher (born September 27, 1969) is an American magazine publisher, graphic designer, musician, and politician from Louisville, Kentucky.

== Magazine ==
Ritcher is the publisher of K Composite Magazine and runs a small publishing house, also called K Composite. The magazine contains interviews of his friends and other people who are not famous. The publication has been featured in Rolling Stone, the Chicago Tribune, and on NPR's Talk of the Nation.

== Music ==
Ritcher is the former proprietor of the Slamdek Record Company, which released early recordings by influential punk and indie rock bands, including Endpoint, Rodan, Jawbox, and Ritcher's own bands, Sunspring and Metroschifter. The label's first release was a cassette tape by the synthesizer band Pink Aftershock in 1986, and its last was a Sunspring retrospective CD in 1995. Slamdek pressed 44 different records during its nine years in business.

Sunspring reunited on May 14, 2010, to play a benefit concert for Jason Noble of Rodan and Rachel's.

Ritcher's first solo album, Scott Ritcher, was released in 1999. Nashville Geographic followed in 2001. In 2016, he issued the EP Simple Orbits and his latest, The Kentuckian, came out in 2019.

Discography

- Scott Ritcher (1999)
- Nashville Geographic (2001)
- Simple Orbits (EP – 2016)
- The Kentuckian (EP – 2019)

== Politics ==
In 1998, Ritcher entered politics as the Reform Party's candidate for Mayor of Louisville. Though he spent only $1,000 on the campaign, Ritcher had a respectable showing at the polls and finished third of four candidates.

Ritcher announced his candidacy in early 2008 as an independent candidate for Kentucky Senate from District 35. A controversial lawsuit brought by the Democratic incumbent, Denise Harper Angel, eventually disqualified Ritcher from the race.

Angel's suit alleged that some of the signatures gathered on Ritcher's ballot petition were those of voters living outside the lines of Kentucky's State Senate District 35, and therefore inadmissible. Reporting on the verdict, the political site Page One Kentucky published the entire court order and noted, "while votes for Ritcher will no longer be counted, the court still backs Ritcher's honesty by plainly stating that the district boundaries that create the 35th Senate District are confusing."

== Other activities ==
In 2008, the Louisville Courier-Journal reported that Ritcher's company K Composite "has completed the sale of its social networking site EggFly.com to a startup company, Ikimbo 2.0 of Radnor, Pennsylvania." According to the bio on his campaign website, Ritcher has been a contributor to LEO, Velocity Weekly, College Music Journal, and public radio's This American Life. He has also appeared as a newspaper photographer in the 1999 film The Insider.

Ritcher moved to Stockholm in 2009 and now holds dual citizenship there and in his native United States.

The musician has appeared in a number of television commercials, including advertisements for Nordea, Boxer, and Direkto, with Alexander Gustafsson.
