= Fences/Mansions split 7-inch =

Fences/Mansions Split 7"

EP by Mansions and Fences
- Released: 2011
- Recorded: Avast! Recording Co.
- Genre: Indie rock
- Length: 7:49
- Label: Onto Entertainment, Burning House Records

Mansions and Fences chronology
Dig Up The Dead (2011)	Fences/Mansions Split 7" (2011)	The Deeper Hurts Reign (Daytrotter Session) (2011)

Fences chronology
Fences (2010)	Fences/Mansions Split 7" (2011)	Doom Loop (2013)

Professional ratings
Review scores
Source	Rating
Punknews	3.5/5 stars

Fences/Mansions Split 7" is a split EP by the Seattle bands Mansions and Fences, released in 2011. The split was recorded at Avast! Studios over two days.

== Track listing ==
No.	Title	Writer(s)	Length
1.	"Marketplace"	Fences	4:19
2.	"On My Way"	Mansions	3:30
