= Feable Weiner =

American power pop band

- Origin: Murfreesboro, Tennessee, USA
- Genres: Pop punk Power pop
- Years active: 2000–present
- Labels: Heinous Records
- Members: Atom Anderson; Josh Watson; Jeff Horne; Andrew Samples

Feable Weiner is an American power pop band from Murfreesboro, Tennessee. The group released their debut album, "Dear Hot Chick" on March 12, 2002. Their single, "San Deem Us Ready" was featured on Doghouse Records' "New Music From The American Landscape" in August, 2004. "2FN HOT" was the band's final release in September 2010.

== Members ==
- Adam Andersen – vocals, guitar
- Josh Watson – guitar, vocals
- Andrew Samples – bass guitar, backing vocals
- Jeff Horne – drums, percussion
