= Slow Joy =

- Born: Esteban Flores
- Origin: Dallas, Texas
- Genres: Grunge; shoegaze; alternative rock; emo
- Label: Mick Music

Slow Joy is a solo musical project by Esteban Flores, mixing elements of grunge, alternative rock, emo, and shoegaze.

The project began after a therapist encouraged Flores to approach music as a tool to process grief. His debut album, A Joy So Slow at Times I Don't Think It's Coming, was released in May 2025.

== Discography ==
=== Albums ===
- A Joy So Slow at Times I Don't Think It's Coming (2025)
- Esteban Flores (2026)

=== EPs ===
- Soft Slam (2022)
- Wildflower (2023)
- Mi Amigo Slow Joy (2024)

=== Singles ===
Title	Year	Peak chart positions	Album
Title	Year	US Alt.	Album
"Gruesome"	2025	30	A Joy So Slow at Times I Don't Think It's Coming
