= American Art (album) =

Studio album by Weatherbox
- Released: May 8, 2007
- Length: 50:00
- Label: Doghouse Records

See Visual arts of the United States for the history of visual arts in the United States.

Professional ratings
Review scores
Source	Rating
Alternative Press	4.5/5 stars

American Art is the debut album of the band Weatherbox. It was released on May 8, 2007, on Doghouse Records. The album received critical acclaim from several sources including underground music distribution company Smartpunk, who lauded the band's style:

Thirteen songs of swelling love and bear-like strength. A stunning first step from this San Diego band destined for greatness. Gigantic guitar hooks and earth-shattering drum work seem to burst through a cloud of smoke, all while the vocalist provides a hefty dose of eclectic melodies with lyrics that harkens back to a bygone psychedelic era. With equal parts prog-rock and symphonic guitar ambience, "American Art" makes an undeniable statement.

The Alternative Press magazine, which gave the album 4 1/2 stars, raved that the record would, "...change your life, if you let it."

== Track listing ==
1. "Atoms Smash"
2. "Armed to the Teeth"
3. "The Clearing"
4. "Wolftank, Doff Thy Name"
5. "Untitled"
6. "Moments Before the Smashing of Future Ryan"
7. "Snakes, Our Ground"
8. "A Flock of Weatherboxes"
9. "I Worship Raw Beats"
10. "The Dreams"
11. "The Drugs"
12. "Drop the Mike"
13. "Trippin' the Life Fantastic"
