= Joan Evans (art historian) =

British art historian

Dame Joan Evans DBE FSA (22 June 1893 – 14 July 1977) was a British historian of French and English medieval art, especially early modern and medieval jewellery. Her notable collection was bequeathed to the Victoria and Albert Museum in London.

== Early life and education ==
Joan Evans was born at Nash Mills, Apsley, Hertfordshire, the daughter of antiquarian and businessman Sir John Evans and classical scholar, archaeologist, and specialist on Greek dress Maria Millington Lathbury (1856–1944). She was half-sister to Sir Arthur Evans, excavator of Knossos and discoverer of Minoan civilisation. Sir Arthur was forty-two years her senior: he caused huge hilarity at an antiquarian conference of learned and erudite gentlemen when he brought in a four-year-old Joan to be "shown off".

Her parents travelled extensively leaving Joan to be cared for by her nanny, Caroline Hancock, whom she knew for 67 years, although, occasionally, she did travel with her nanny to join her parents on their archaeological trips. She dedicated her autobiography, Prelude and Fugue, to Nanny Hancock who died in 1961, aged 97.

Evans was educated at Corran School, Watford, and Berkhamsted School for Girls before going up to St Hugh's College, Oxford. She had originally planned to read for a diploma in anthropology but instead read classical archaeology, gaining a diploma with distinction in 1916. She was appointed librarian at St Hugh's College in 1917 and researched and wrote a thesis on jewellery for her Certificate of Letters in 1919.

This was at a time when women were still not admitted to read for degrees by the University of Oxford so she did not receive her full degree, Bachelor of Letters (B.Litt.), until 1920 after campaigners, including her mother, successfully had the ruling changed. In 1930 she was awarded a D.Litt. by the University of London and, in 1932, an honorary D.Litt. by the University of Oxford.

== Scholarship ==
The Royal Institution of Great Britain's records suggest that Evans was the first woman to give a Friday Evening Discourse at the Institution: this was on 8 June 1923, the title being "Jewels of the Renaissance".

After publishing her first books on jewellery in the 1920s, English Jewellery from the Fifth Century A.D. to 1800 and Magical Jewels of the Middle Ages and the Renaissance, particularly in England, Evans published widely on a variety of subjects including the art and architecture of France. In 1950, Evans's book Cluniac Art of the Romanesque Period, which concerned art and sculptures made by the monks of the abbey at Cluny in eastern France, was published by Cambridge University Press; her book on The Romanesque Architecture of the Order of Cluny having been published in 1938.

A Fellow of the Society of Antiquaries of London, she published the society's official history in 1956, and served as its first woman president from 1959 to 1964.

== Other ==
Evans travelled from a young age, a trip with her mother to Rome when she was 21 led to her decision to study archaeology rather than anthropology, and she developed a lifelong love for France. She visited France both for research and for pleasure and in 1947 she purchased the Romanesque Chapel of the Monks in Berzé-la-Ville, donating it to the Académie de Mâcon.

A collector of art and artefacts, particularly pre-revolutionary French jewellery, she was a benefactor. Not only did she donate her entire collection of more than 800 jewels, ranging in date from the Middle Ages to the early nineteenth century, to the Victoria and Albert Museum in 1975 but also a large collection of posy rings and other artefacts to the British Museum. Her will left collections to the Ashmolean Museum, Oxford, and the Birmingham City Art Gallery.

She was also a major benefactor of St Hugh's College, and assisted in the purchase of the ridge above her home at Wotton-under-Edge for the National Trust. She gave her time and money to various causes, often anonymously, and, despite being described as "one of the most distinguished and influential figures of the century in art and antiquarian scholarship" at her Memorial Service at St Hugh's College in 1977, she was made Dame Commander of the British Empire in the New Year's Honours List of 1976, not for her pioneering work in the arts, but for charitable services.

Evans had an association with The Courtauld Institute of Art; she was made an honorary librarian in 1931 and, when T. S. R. Boase left the Courtauld in 1947, she taught there for a year, with one of her students being Pamela Tudor-Craig. As well as writing biographies of her brother Sir Arthur Evans and John Ruskin, amongst others, she also published the book, The Conways: a History of Three Generations, about the family that included the art historian Martin Conway whose collection of photographs formed the basis for the Conway Library at the Courtauld. Photographs taken in France by Joan Evans are included in the archive of the Conway Library currently being digitised under the wider Courtauld Connects project.

=== Selection of honours and public work ===
In addition to becoming the first female president of the Society of Antiquaries, and awarded the society's Gold Medal in 1973, she was also president of the Royal Archaeological Institute from 1948 to 1951 and of the Bristol and Gloucestershire Archaeological Society.

Evans served as a member of the V&A's Advisory Council from 1953 to 1966 and as a trustee of the British Museum (1963–1967).

She was made an Honorary Fellow of St. Hugh's College, Oxford; an honorary doctor of letters from Cambridge; and awarded the honour Chevalier de la Légion d'honneur as well as fellowships from the Royal Historical Society and the Royal Society of Literature.

== Personal life ==
Evans bought Thousand Acres, Wotton-under-Edge, in 1939 and lived there, dividing her time between Gloucestershire and her London apartment, until her death in 1977 at the age of 84. She was unmarried.

== Publications ==
- English Jewellery from the Fifth Century A.D. to 1800, London, Methuen, 1921
- Magical Jewels of the Middle Ages and the Renaissance, particularly in England, Oxford, Clarendon Press, 1922
- Anglo Norman Lapidaries, 1924
- Life in Mediaeval France, Oxford University Press, 1925 (Also in French: Civilisation en France au Moyen Age and in Dutch: Leven in de Middeleeuwen).
- St Joan of Orleans: scenes from the 15th century "Mystére de Siége d'Orleans", by Peter Studer, selected and translated by Joan Evans, Clarendon Press, 1926
- The Unconquered Knight: a chronicle of the deeds of Don Pero Nino, Count of Buelna, by his standard bearer, Diaz de Gamez, Translated and selected from El Vitorial by Joan Evans, Routledge, 1928
- Pattern, a Study of Ornament in Western Europe from 1180 to 1900, 2 vols, Oxford, Clarendon Press, 1931
- Monastic Life at Cluny, 1931; Archon Books, USA, 1968
- English Posies and Posy Rings: catalogue with introduction by Joan Evans, Oxford University Press, 1931
- English Mediaeval Lapidaries, 1933, by Joan Evans and Mary S. Serjeantson (ed.)
- Nature in Design A Study of Naturalism in Decorative Art, from the Bronze Age to the Renaissance, London, Oxford University Press, 1933
- The Palace of Minos: Index of artefacts, vol. 5, compiled by Joan Evans in collaboration with Sir Arthur Evans, Cambridge University Press, 1936
- The Romanesque Architecture of the Order of Cluny, Cambridge University Press, 1938
- Joinville's History of Saint Louis, edited by Joan Evans, Gregynog Press, 1937; Oxford University Press, 1938
- Taste and Temperament. A Brief Study of Psychological Types in their relation to the Visual Arts. Jonathan Cape. 1939.
- Chateaubriand: a Biography, Macmillan, 1939
- Time and Chance: The Story of Arthur Evans and his Forebears, 1943
- The Pursuit of Happiness: The Story of Madame de Sérilly 1762–1799, Longmans, Green and Co., 1946
- The Unselfish Egoist: A life of Joseph Joubert, Longmans, Green and Co., 1947
- Art in Mediaeval France, 987–1498, London, Oxford University Press, 1948
- English Art: 1307–1461, Oxford History of English Art, Oxford, Clarendon Press, 1949
- Cluniac Art of the Romanesque Period, Cambridge University Press, 1950; edited, with John Howard Whitehouse
- Style in Ornament, Oxford University Press, 1950
- Dress in Mediaeval France, Oxford, Clarendon Press, 1952
- A History of Jewellery, 1100–1870, Faber & Faber, 1953
- John Ruskin, Jonathan Cape 1954: the first biography of Ruskin to be written by a biographer with access to Ruskin's own diaries
- The Endless Web: A History of John Dickinson & Co. Ltd., 1804–1954, Jonathan Cape, 1955
- History of the Society of Antiquaries, 1956
- John Ruskin: Diaries, 3 vols., Oxford, Clarendon Press, 1956
- The Lamp of Beauty: Writings on Art by John Ruskin, selected and edited by Joan Evans, Phaidon, Oxford, 1959
- Madame Royale, Museum Press, 1959
- Prelude & Fugue: An Autobiography, London, Museum Press, 1964
- Monastic Architecture in France from the Renaissance to the Revolution, Cambridge University Press, 1964
- The Conways: a History of Three Generations, London, Museum Press, 1966
- The Victorians, Cambridge University Press, 1966
- The Flowering of the Middle Ages, edited by Joan Evans, Thames & Hudson, London, 1966; also in German as Blüte des Mittelalters; in Dutch as De glorie der Middeleeuwen. 2, Den Haag, W. Gaade, s.d.; in Spanish, trans. Mireia Bofill, 1988
- Monastic Iconography in France from the Renaissance to the Revolution, Cambridge University Press, 1970

== See also ==
- Women in the art history field
