= Dig Up the Dead =

Studio album by Mansions
- Released: April 5, 2011
- Recorded: 2009–2010
- Genre: Alternative rock, indie rock
- Length: 35:00
- Label: King Bones Recordings, Burning House Records
- Producer: Christopher Browder, Robin Dove

Mansions chronology
Best of the Bees (2010)	Dig Up the Dead (2011)	Fences/Mansions Split 7" (2011)

Alternative cover 1
- Acoustic Version Cover

Professional ratings
Review scores
Source	Rating
Absolutepunk	9/10 stars
Sputnikmusic	4/5 stars

Dig Up the Dead is the second official full-length album from Seattle, Washington, indie-rock band Mansions.

In the winter of 2009 through the early spring of 2010, Mansions worked on demos for the album in Winston-Salem, North Carolina. In April 2010, recording took place in Christopher's parents' house in Louisville, Kentucky. Additional recording and mixing took place back in North Carolina.

== Track listing ==
1. "Dig Up The Dead" - 3:59
2. "Blackest Sky" - 3:24
3. "Not My Blood" - 3:46
4. "City Don't Care" - 3:43
5. "Call Me When It's Over" - 3:09
6. "Wormhole" - 3:15
7. "Close That Door" - 3:12
8. "Seven Years" - 3:34
9. "You Got Cool" - 3:32
10. "Yer Voice" - 3:34

Vinyl Bonus Track
No.	Title	Length
11.	"All Those Dreams"

== Personnel ==
- All songs written by Christopher Browder
- Christopher Browder - Vocals, guitar, bass, percussion
- Robin Dove - Vocals (on "Not My Blood", "Close That Door", "Seven Years", and "You Got Cool")
- Salvatore Cassato - Drums (on "Blackest Sky", "Not My Blood", "You Got Cool", and "Yer Voice")
- Bryan Whiteman - Bass (on "Blackest Sky" and "Not My Blood")

Technical

- Christopher Browder - Production, Recording, and Mixing.
- Robin Dove - Additional Production
- Joe LaPorta - Mastering

Artwork

- Patrick Leger - Cover Illustration
- Christopher Browder & Chris Hansen - Layout

== Vinyl release ==
The album was released on vinyl through Clifton Motel. The vinyl edition features a bonus track not included on the CD version.

Color(s)	Pressed	Notes
Pink	50	1st Pressing
White	120	1st Pressing
Red	150	1st Pressing
Red/White Swirl	170	1st Pressing

- Certain pre-orders of the vinyl came with a bonus disc, including acoustic versions of every song from Dig Up The Dead. First 50 orders came with an 8 1/2" x 11" letterpress art print designed by Christopher Browder.
