= Mansion House =

Mansion House may refer to:

== Great Britain and Ireland ==
- Mansion House, Bristol
- Mansion House, Dublin
- Mansion House, Hurstpierpoint, West Sussex
- Mansion House, London
  - Mansion House tube station, on the London Underground
- Mansion House, Cardiff
- Mansion House, Doncaster, South Yorkshire
- Mansion House, Newcastle upon Tyne
- Mansion House, Newport
- Mansion House, Old Warden Park, Bedfordshire
- Mansion House, Swansea
- Mansion House, York, North Yorkshire

== United States ==
- Joseph Smith Mansion House, Nauvoo, Illinois, a contributing property to the Nauvoo Historic District
- The Mansion House (Robbinston, Maine), listed on the National Register of Historic Places (NRHP)
- Mansion House (Public Landing, Maryland), NRHP-listed
- Mansion House (Trenton, New Jersey), NRHP-listed
- Mansion House (McDowell, Virginia), NRHP-listed
- Mathew H. Ritchey House, NRHP-listed and also known as Mansion House
- Mansion House at Culver Studios in Culver City, California

== Other places ==
- Mansion House, Baguio, a summer retreat house of the President of the Philippines better known simply as The Mansion
- Mansion House, Kawau Island, house in New Zealand owned by Governor Grey

== See also ==
- Mansion (disambiguation)
