= Medieval jewelry =

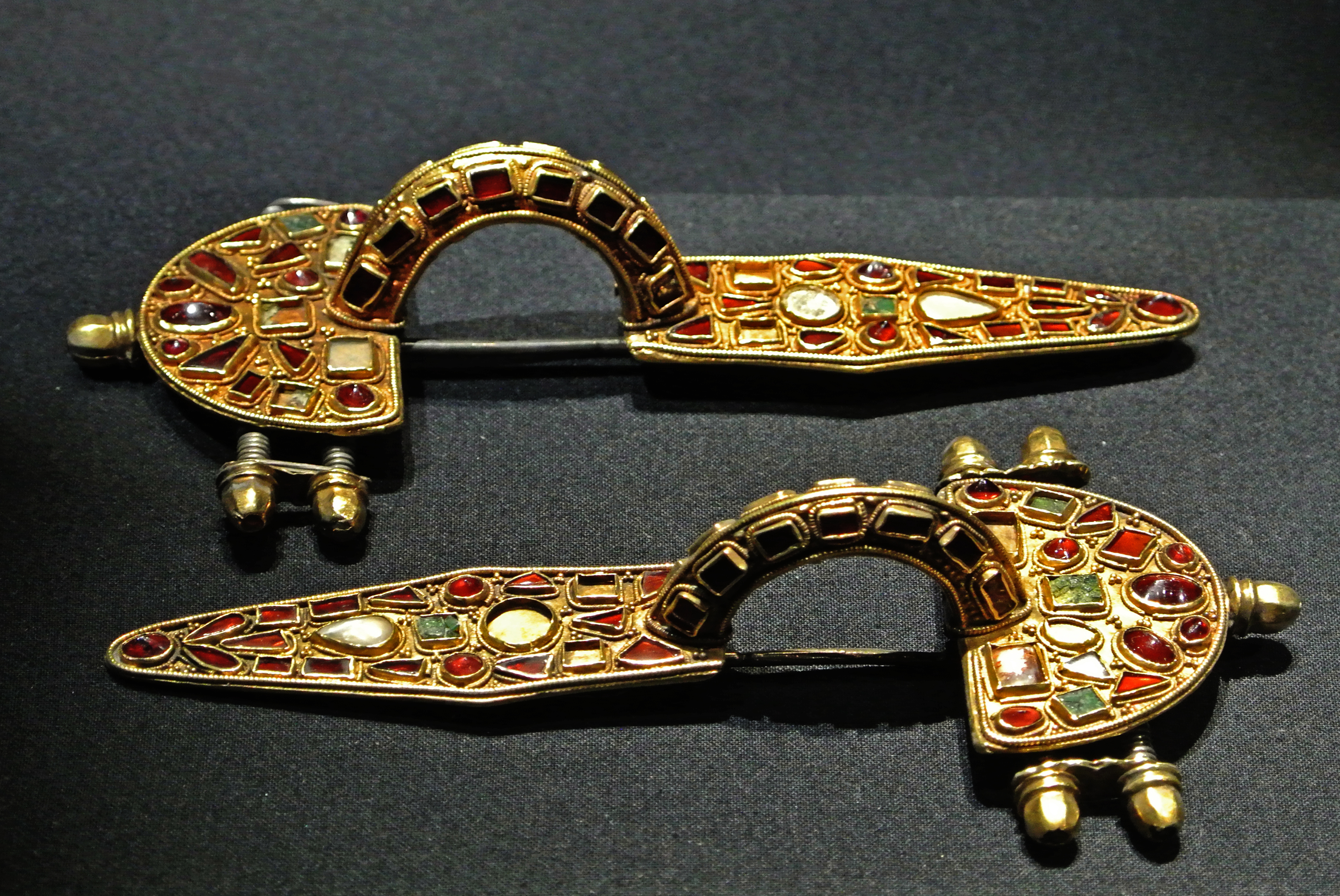
Germanic fibulae, early 5th century

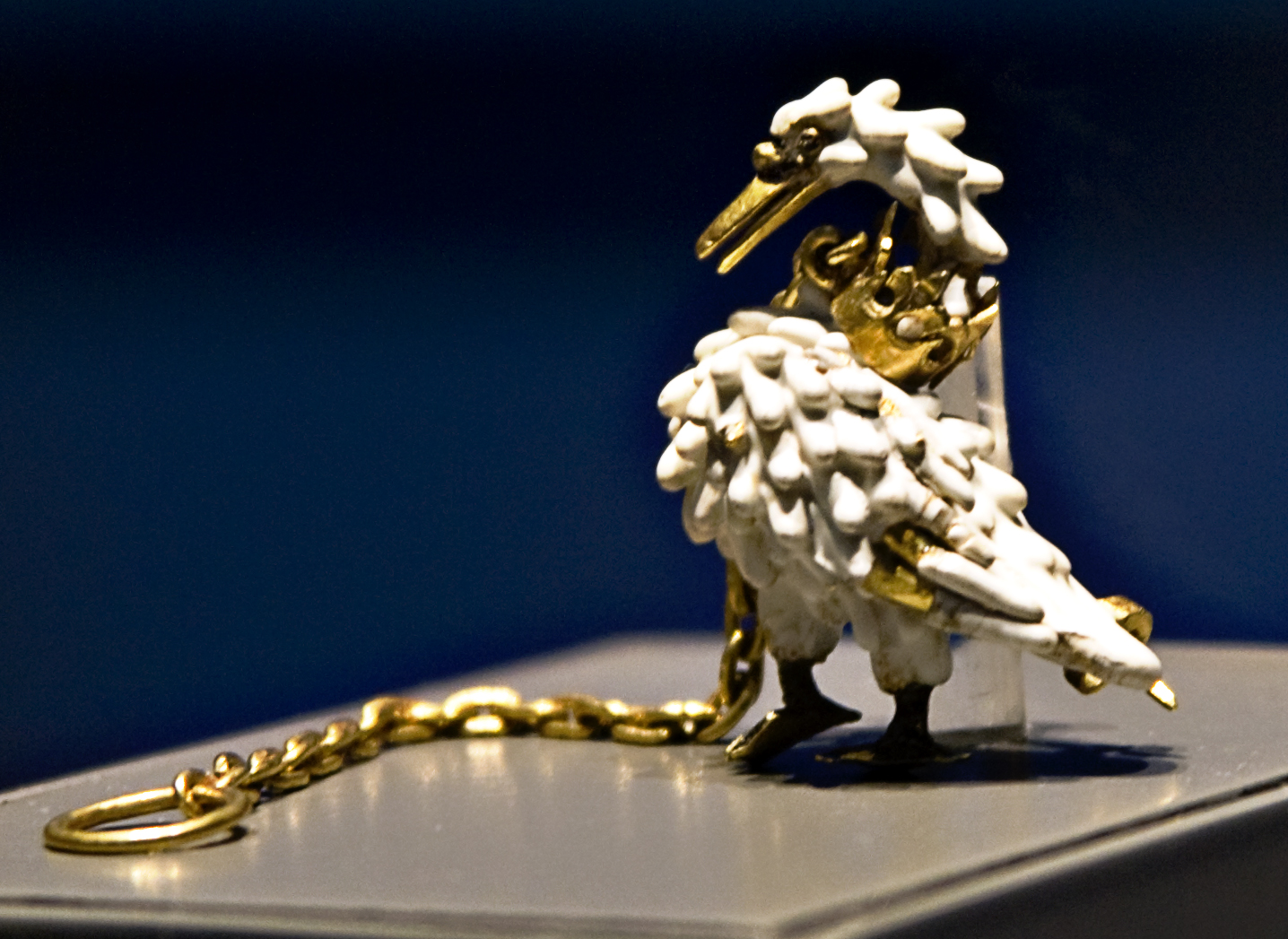
The Dunstable Swan Jewel, a livery badge in gold and ronde bosse enamel, about 1400.

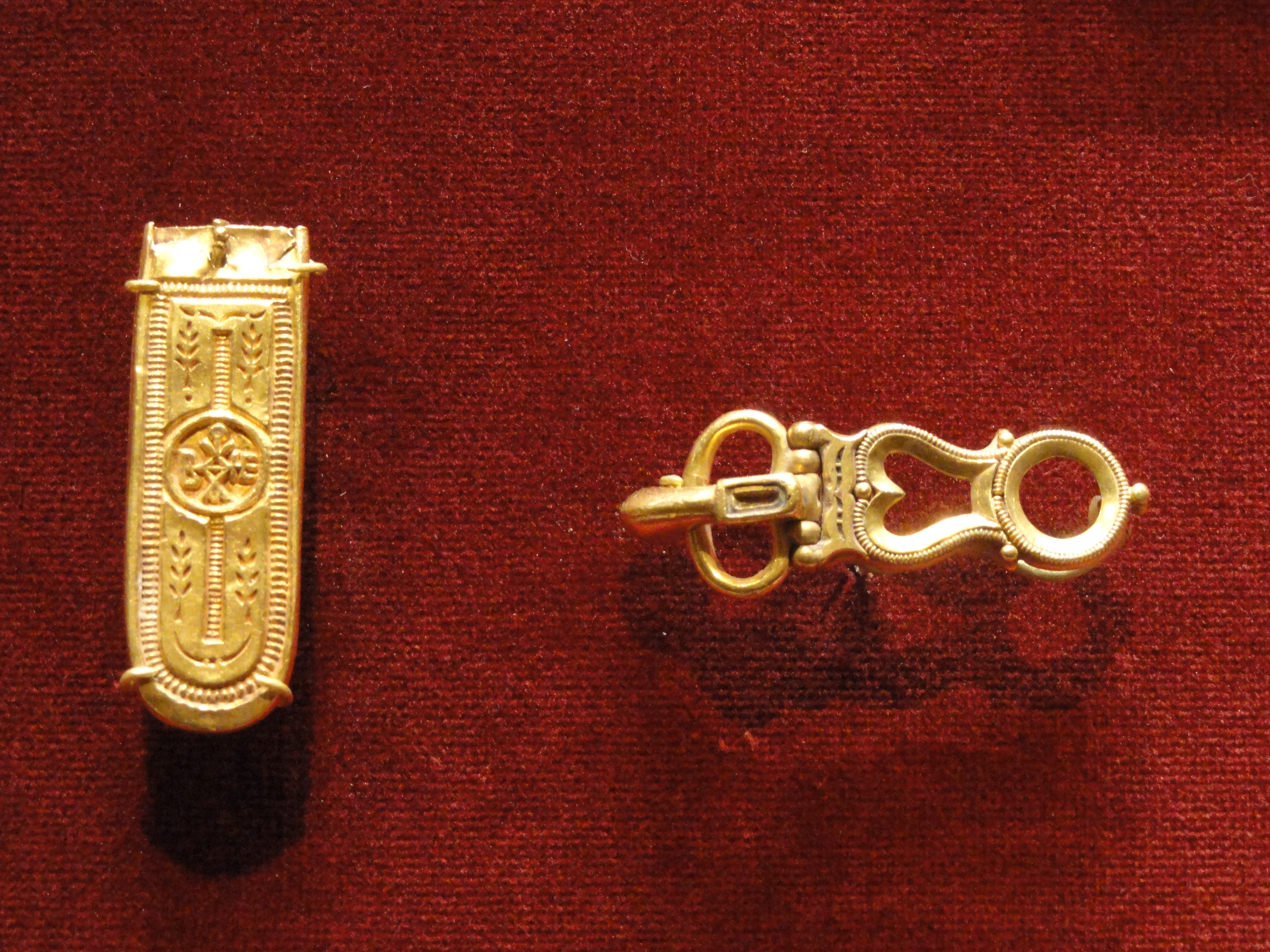
Gold belt end and buckle, c. 600, Avar version of Byzantine style

The Middle Ages was a period that spanned approximately 1000 years and is normally restricted to Europe and the Byzantine Empire. The surviving material remains from that time, including jewelry, can vary greatly depending on the place and time of their creation, especially as Christianity discouraged the burial of jewelry as grave goods, except for royalty and important clerics, who were often buried in their best clothes and wearing jewels. The main material used for jewelry design in antiquity and leading into the Middle Ages was gold. Many different techniques were used to create working surfaces and add decoration to those surfaces to produce the jewelry, including soldering, plating and gilding, repoussé, chasing, inlay, enameling, filigree and granulation, stamping, striking and casting. Major stylistic phases include barbarian, Byzantine, Carolingian and Ottonian, Viking, and the Late Middle Ages, when Western European styles became relatively similar.

Most styles and techniques used in jewelry for personal adornment, the main subject of this article, were also used in pieces of decorated metalwork, which was the most prestigious form of art through most of this period; these were often much larger. Most surviving examples are religious objects such as reliquaries, church plate such as chalices and other pieces, crosses like the Cross of Lothair, and treasure bindings for books. However this is largely an accident of survival, as the church has proved much better at preserving its treasures than secular or civic elites, and at the time there may well have been as many secular objects made in the same styles. For example, the Royal Gold Cup, a secular cup though decorated with religious imagery, is one of a handful of survivals of the huge collections of metalwork joyaux ("jewels") owned by the Valois dynasty who ruled France in the late Middle Ages.

In addition to basic forms of personal jewelry such as rings, necklaces, bracelets, and brooches that remain in use today, medieval jewelry often includes a range of other forms less often found in modern jewelry, such as fittings and fasteners for clothes including, buckles, "points" for the end of laces, and buttons by the end of the period, as well as hat badges, decorations for belts, weapons, purses and other accessories, and decorated pins, mostly for holding hairstyles and head-dresses in place. Neck chains carried a variety of pendants, from crosses (the most common) to lockets and elaborate pieces with gems. Thin "fillets" or strips of flexible gold sheet, often decorated, were probably mostly sewn into hair or head-dresses. Arm-rings ("armillae") and sometimes ankle-rings were also sometimes worn, and sometimes (for the very rich) many small pieces of jewelry were sewn into the cloth of garments forming patterns.

== Social implications ==
Jewelry was used in different ways as a very important marker of identity such as social status. Additionally, it served as an indicator of wealth, literacy, and faith. For example, aristocratic families used jewelry to re-enforce their rank by wearing an emblem of the lineage that they belonged to.

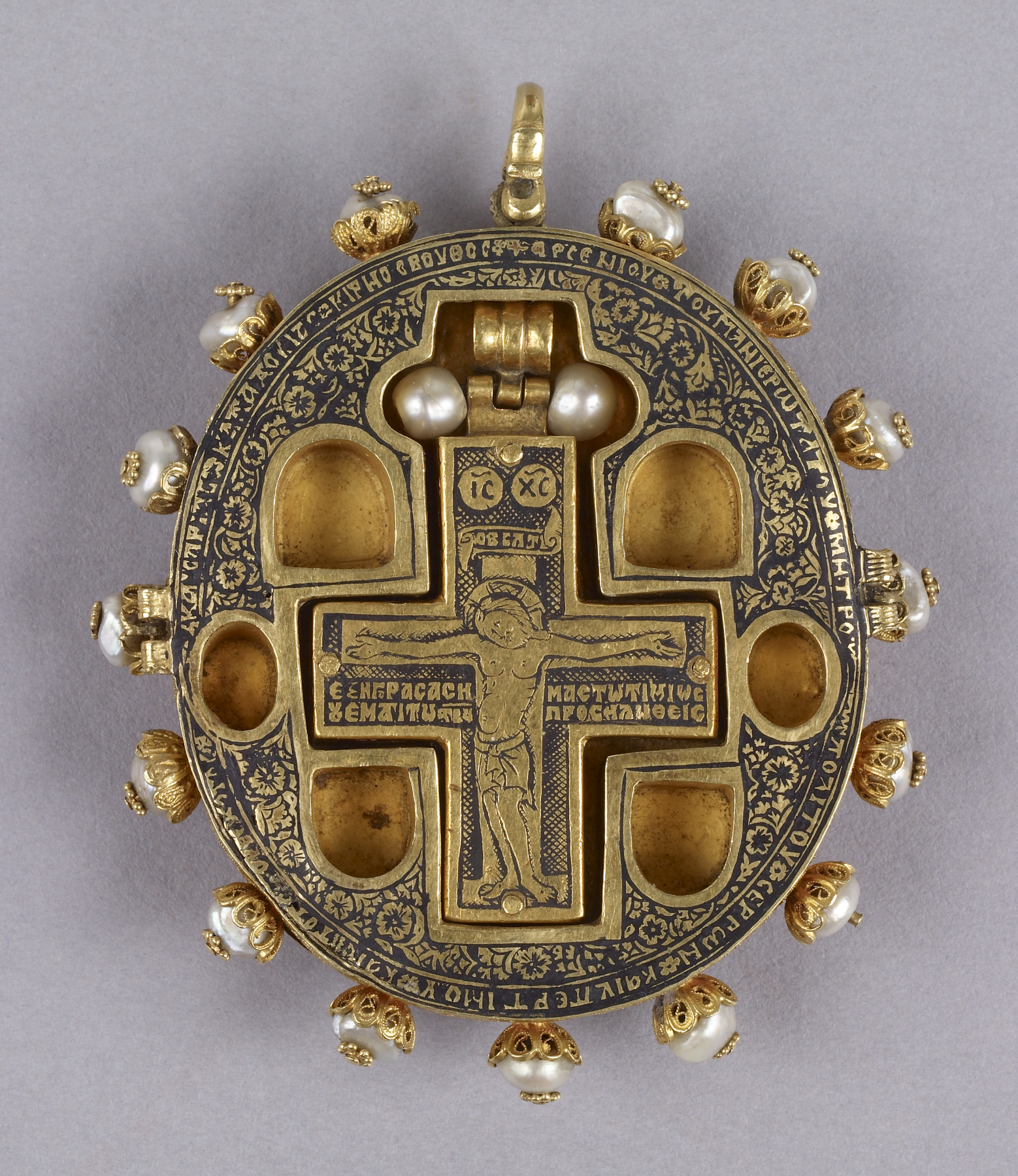
Reliquary Pendant with Virgin and Child

=== Reliquary jewelry ===
Additionally, wearing jewelry sold near pilgrimage sites or containing relics was a way to for those who have voyaged to display piety. Many times this looked like a pendant cross that contained a souvenir from their journey. Pilgrims also took such souvenirs from these sites, usually oils or pieces of earth, in hopes that they would protect them on their journey back home and improve the quality of their prayers. Typically, these pendants were hinged at the top and were worn around the neck as amulets. One example of this type of necklace being a reliquary cross from the Medieval Byzantine period from around 1100–1200 AD.

=== Medicinal amulets and gems ===
Similarly, some precious stones in the Middle Ages were thought to have medicinal benefits. For example, certain jewels were worn by pregnant women to ensure a safe pregnancy and delivery as death through childbirth was common. Sapphires were attributed with certain magical properties that were used to detect fraud, cure snakebites, and expel witchcraft. Other materials such as coral, fossils, and teeth were worn to fight disease. In Italy, there was a practice of coral worn around the neck of infants to imitate pictures of Christ wearing coral as a child. Gems were chosen by wearers based on the healing powers they were thought to have had as well as the associated meanings behind their color and size. Lapidaries were an extremely popular type of work in the Middle Ages, and listed the many medical and quasi-magical powers attributed to gems, as well as their religious symbolism and sometimes their astrological significance.

=== Viking jewelry ===
For the Vikings, a group of peoples that were constantly exposed to conflict and social tensions, women used clothing and jewelry to express a sense of belonging to a particular social, political, tribal, or other form of group. Because of this, the investigation of the distribution of decorative items used by Norse woman such as brooches and clasps can be used to interpret tensions between regions. For example, the disappearance of a pattern of jewelry distribution that suggests a united identity across a territory can suggest uneasy social or political conditions in that area.

=== Social status ===
A way to distinguish rank through the use of jewelry was by observing the difference in materials that people wore. For example, jewelry obtained by the lower class typically was made of base metals such as copper, while higher class individuals such as royalty often wore gold and precious gems. In the 13th century, jewelry became the province of aristocratic and noble houses, as merchants gained the wealth to purchase luxury goods, resulting in sumptuary laws prohibiting commoners from wearing jewelry with precious stones, pearls and excess amounts of gold or silver. This was in an effort to keep a distinction between the socially elite and those who displayed jewelry that suggested a deceivingly higher rank than they occupied. An example of this regulation being a fifteenth century law from Germany that prohibited women from displaying more than one gold chain at a time.

By the end of the period, the types of personal jewelry worn by wealthy women were not very different from those found today, with rings, necklaces, brooches, lockets and (less often) earrings all popular. But accessories such as belts and purses, as well as other personal possessions such as combs and book-covers might also be jeweled in a way rarely found today. Poorer women wore smaller quantities of similar styles of personal jewelry in cheaper materials, as today. Wealthy men wore far more jewelry than today, often including large chain collars, and a cap badge, which might be very extravagant.

== Raw materials ==
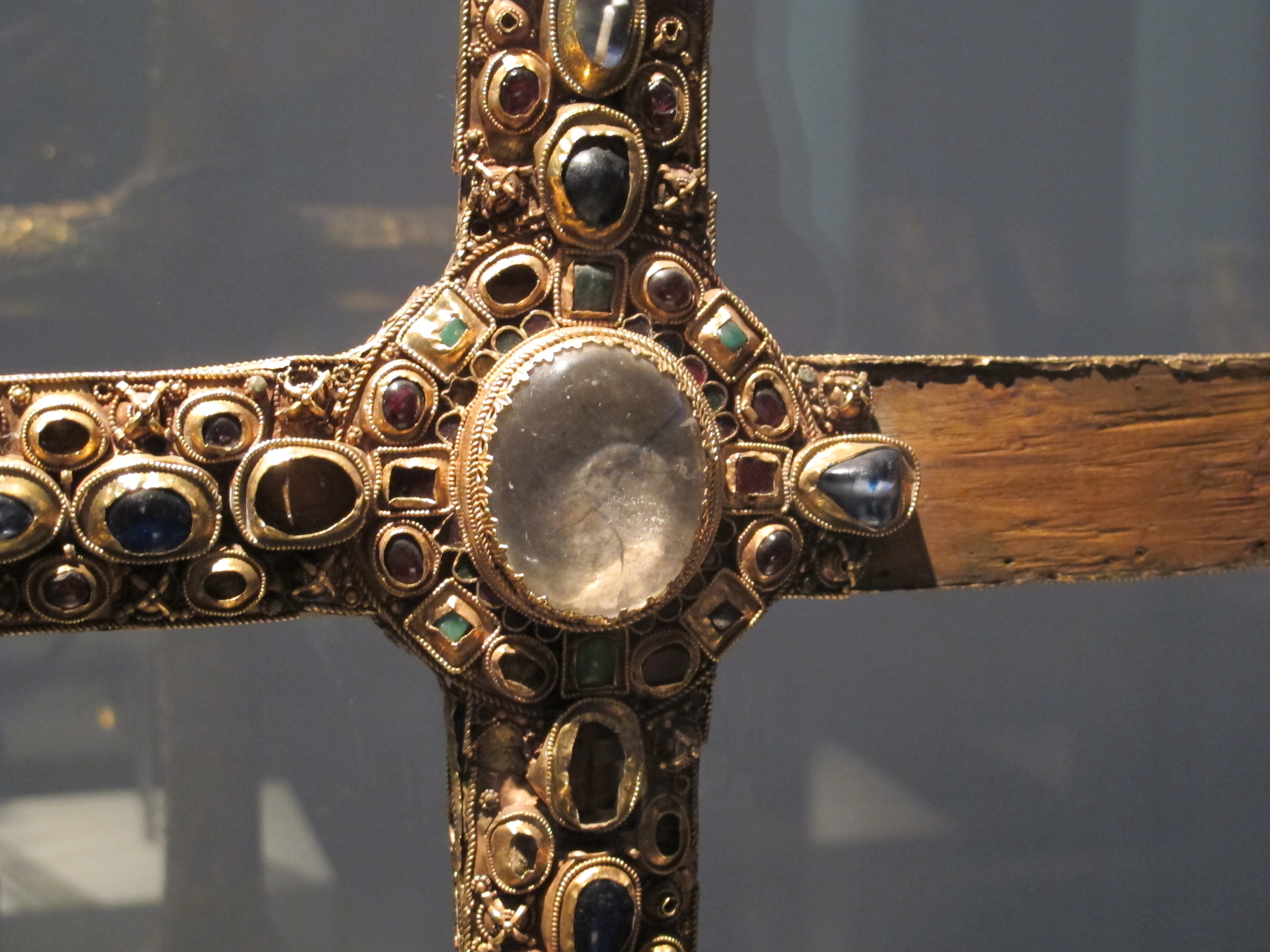
In early medieval jeweled objects, gems were often set profusely spaced across surfaces, here a cross

=== Precious metals ===
Gold has held the fascination of humans for thousands of years. By the end of the fourth millennium BCE it was already being worked and refined with great technical skill. Many ancient goldsmiths used alloyed gold found in nature, as it does not often occur naturally. Alloyed gold can be purified through a process called refining, and due to the Hittite derivation of the Greek word, it is believed that the ancient peoples of Asia Minor were the first to refine gold. Ignoring its beauty and the possible association with the sun's perceived mystical powers, the main advantage of using gold to create jewelry was its malleability.

The Romans were voracious producers and consumers of gold, and all but exhausted European deposits. Some gold mined in West Africa, more at the end of the period, probably reached Europe through the Islamic world, but the main source was undoubtedly ancient Roman gold that remained above ground in coin or object form, or was recovered from buried hoards. Gold ran short at several periods, and European gold coinage was unusual throughout the period, in contrast to the Byzantine and Islamic worlds. In contrast silver was mined in Europe throughout the Middle Ages, with very large deposits discovered at Kutná Hora in Bohemia in 1298 that lasted until the end of the period.

=== Gemstones ===
Nearly all gemstones had to be imported from outside Europe, though Insular jewelry used native stones. Amber, jet, freshwater pearls and coral could be found within Europe. The modern facet-cut style of gemcutting was only developed at the end of the period, and before that stones were all cut and polished in variations of what is now called a cabouchon cut, with rounded contours. Diamonds are relatively unexciting, and very difficult to create, in cabouchon style, and other stones such as ruby and emerald were the most highly prized, but a wide range of stones were used, with modern distinctions between precious and semi-precious stones largely ignored, and clear rock crystal, sometimes engraved, popular. Large stones were greatly valued, and many rulers and great nobles amassed collections, which were often frequently reset.

Ancient engraved gems were often reused among stones, which in early medieval jeweled objects were often set profusely, spaced out across surfaces, mixed with ornaments in gold. Medieval gem engraving only recaptured the full skills of classical gem engravers at the end of the period, but simpler inscriptions and motifs were sometimes added earlier. Pearls gathered in the wild from the Holarctic freshwater pearl mussel were much used, with Scotland a major source; this species is now endangered in most areas.

=== Adhesives ===
Various adhesives were used to stick precious metal foils to wood or any other support that functioned as a basis for the work of art. In his treatise, at book III, chapter LIX, entitled De confectione quæ dicitur tenax, Theophylus speaks about a preparation called confectio tenax. The material cited by Theophylus has a double role: it should act as an adhesive and as a filling. Current analytical evidence has shown that it has also a double composite chemical nature: the inorganic part forms the inert mass on which to work metals and can be made of sand, clay, powdered bricks and tiles, or the so-called cocciopesto (powdered bricks mixed with mortar), while the organic part works as an adhesive between metal and wood and is made of wax and/or pitch.

== Styles ==
=== Northern Europe in the Migration Period ===
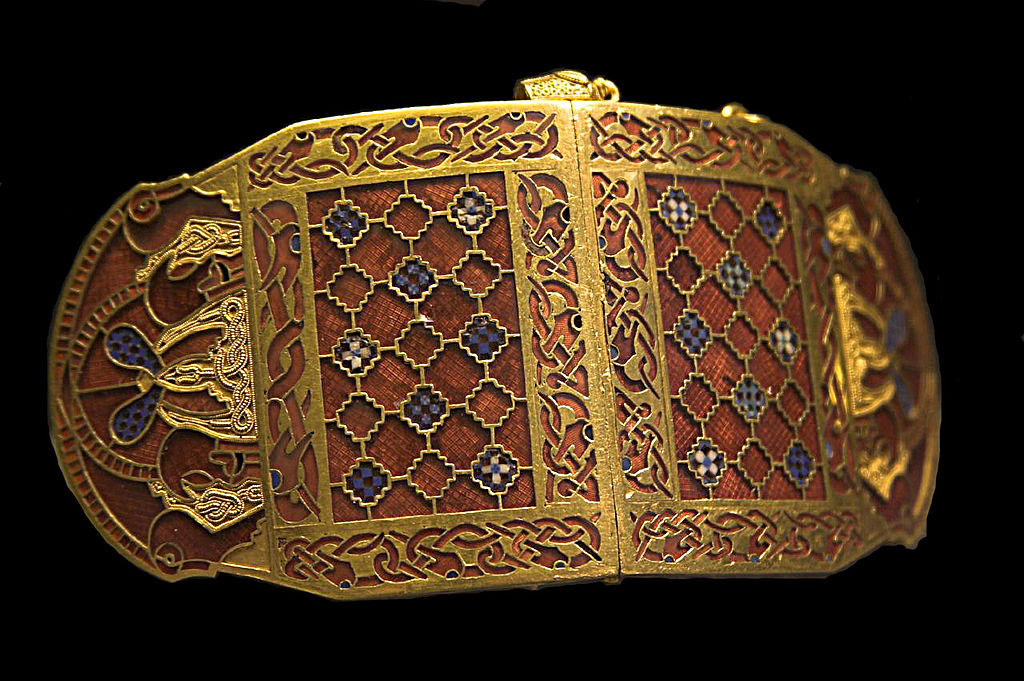
The famous shoulder-clasps from Sutton Hoo, one of the finest examples of gold and garnet cloisonné inlay work (not enamel)

Barbarian jewelry of the Migration Period is one of the most common forms of surviving art from their cultures, and the personal adornment of the elite was clearly considered of great importance, for men as well of women. Large jeweled fibula brooches, worn singly (with a cloak) or in pairs (for many types of women's dress) on the chest were made in a number of forms based on Roman styles, as the barbarian peoples including the Visigoths, Ostrogoths, Franks, Anglo-Saxons and Lombards took over the territories of the Western Roman Empire. These and other jewels very often used gold and garnet cloisonné, where patterns were made by thin chips of garnet (and other stones) laid into small gold cells. Enamel was sometimes used in the same style, often as a cheaper substitute for the stones. In the Insular art of the British Isles the preferred shape was the penannular brooch, and exceptionally large and elaborate examples like the Tara Brooch and Hunterston Brooch were worn by both secular elites and the clergy (at least on liturgical vestments). Relatively few other types of jewelry have survived from this place and period. The wearing of cheaper forms of jewelry appears to have reached quite far down the social scale; gold was relatively cheap at the period.

Though mostly based on Roman models, styles varied with the different tribes or people, and the jewelry buried in graves can be used to trace the movement of ethnic groups, having presumably served with other aspects of costume as a cultural identifier for the living.

The Anglo-Saxons who founded the Anglo-Saxon kingdoms of England preferred round disk brooches to either fibulae or penannular forms, also using gold and garnet cloisonné along with other styles. The finest and most famous collection of barbarian jewelry is the set for the adornment of (probably) an Anglo-Saxon king of about 620 recovered at the Sutton Hoo burial site in England in the mid-20th century.

=== Byzantine, Carolingian and Ottonian ===
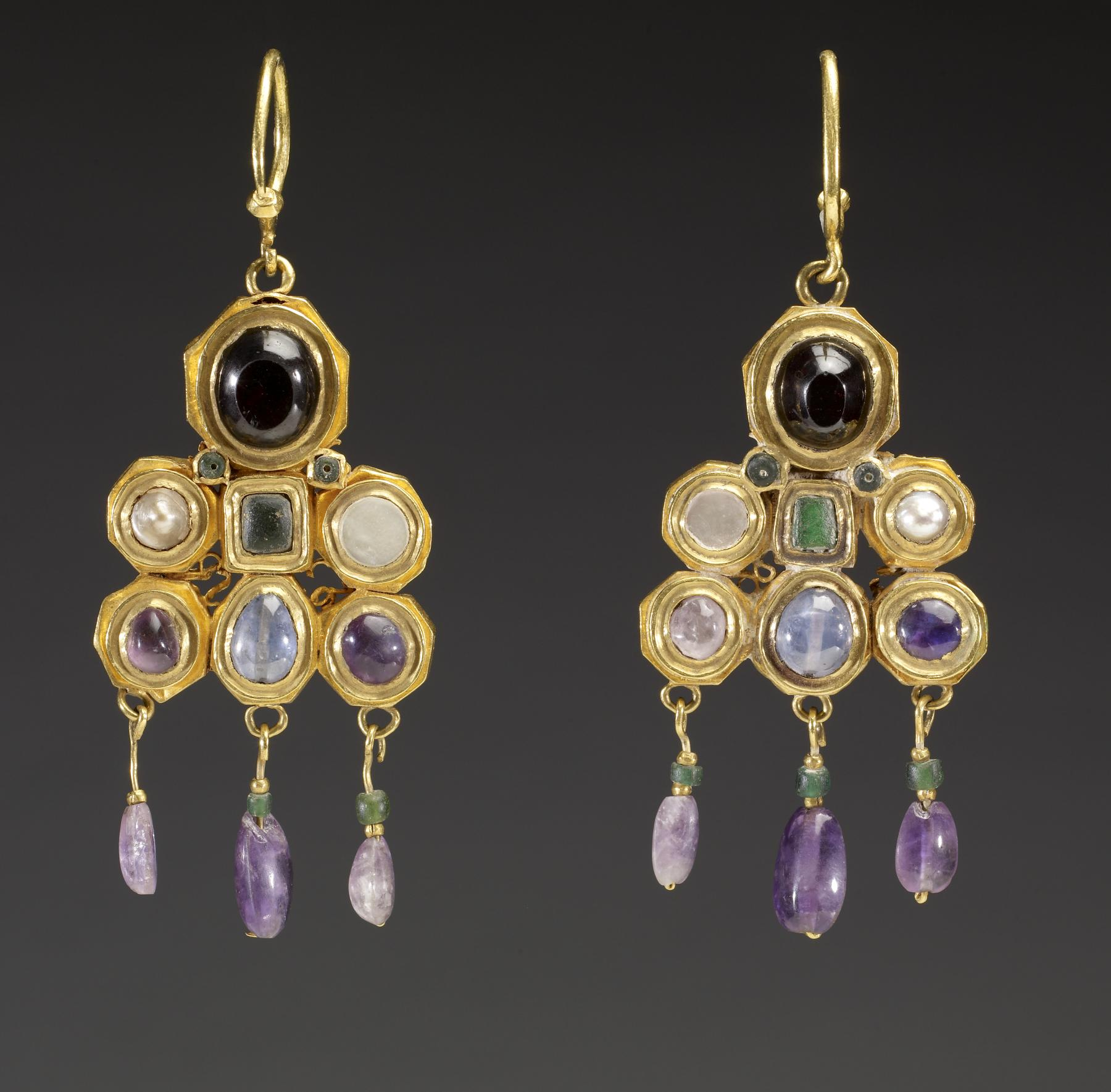
Byzantine pair of earrings, c. 600 AD

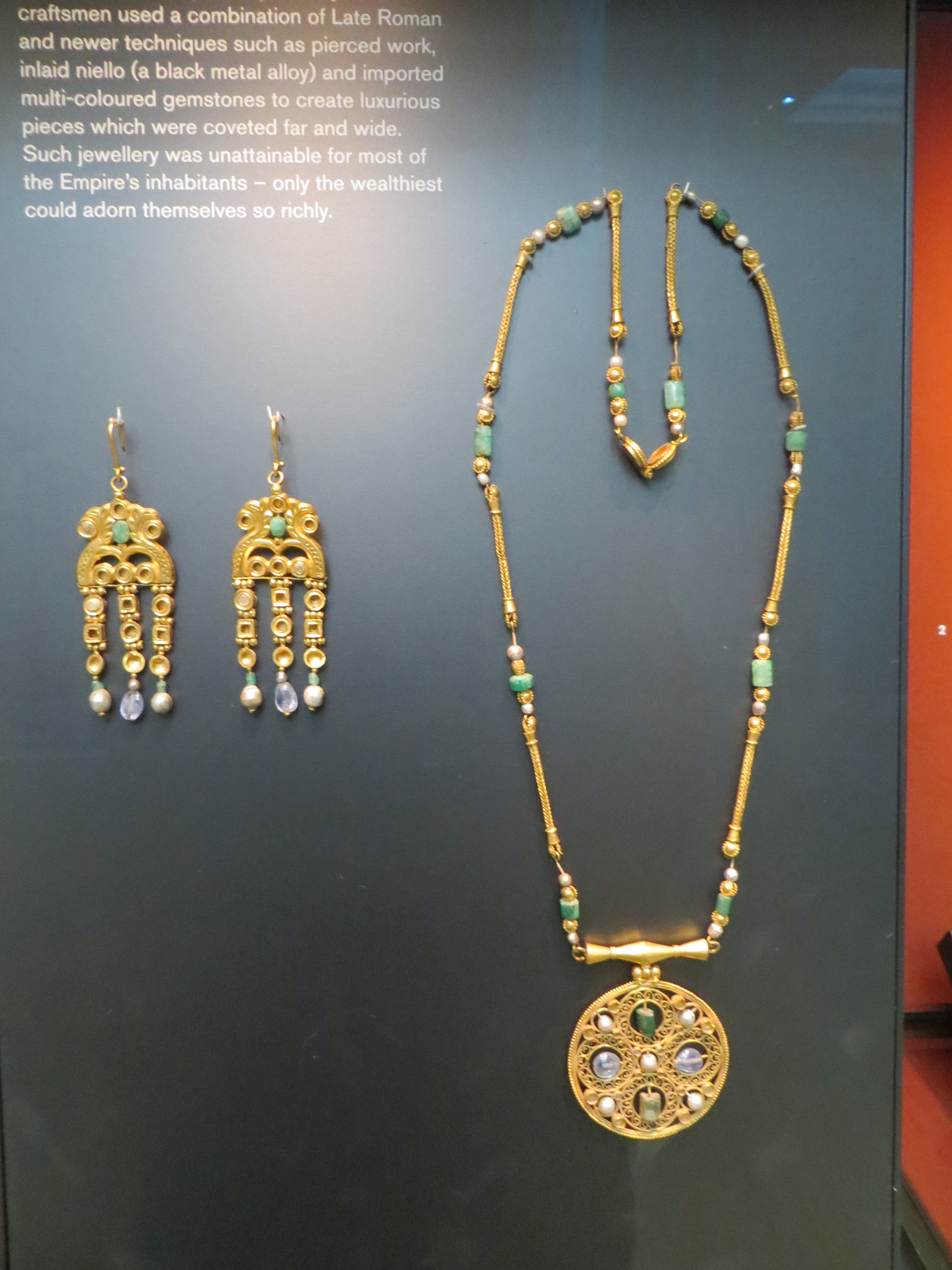
Byzantine necklace and pair of earrings found at Asyut, Egypt c. 600 AD (British Museum)

The jewelry of the Byzantine Empire often features religious images or motifs such as the cross, even in pieces that were for secular use. Elaborate Roman styles were continued, but with growing use of cloisonné enamel. The main commissions for gold work and jewelry came from the Court or the Church. As such, much of the jewelry was very religious, involving ornate crosses and depictions of the afterlife or of saints' lives. The Byzantines excelled in inlaying and their work was enormously opulent, involving precious stones, glass and gold. Not much of Byzantine jewelry remains, as this period marked the end of burying a person's jewelry with them, so much of the truly extravagant jewelry – depicted in mosaics and paintings – has disappeared. Carolingian jewelry is similar to Byzantine in that the modern world has lost almost all of it, except that which was created for religious purposes. The Carolingians were similar to the barbarians in their love of color, but the techniques they used – especially enameling – are much more reminiscent of the Byzantines. The most outstanding piece of jewelry that still remains from this period is the crown of Charlemagne, with precious stones, filigree, enamel and gold. The Ottonian style is, again, very similar to the Byzantines and the Carolingians. Religion plays a main part in the jewelry that remains. The Ottonian style characterizes a cross between German and Byzantine, superior in both technicality and delicacy.

=== Viking ===
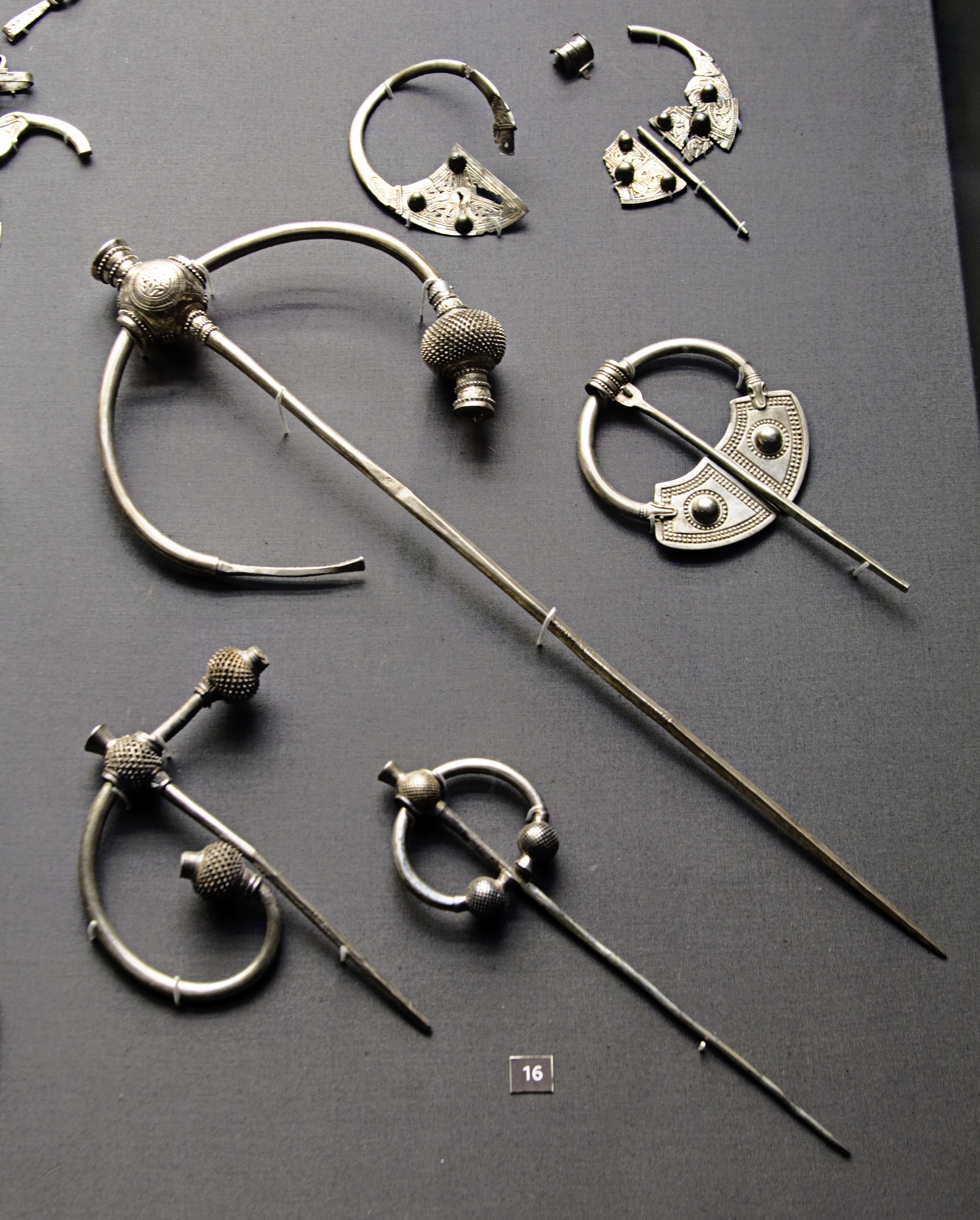
Viking-period penannular brooches in silver from the Penrith Hoard, three of the "thistle" type.

Viking jewelry began rather plainly – with unadorned bands and rings – but quickly developed into intricate and masterful artistry, with a strong preference for silver, unusual in the Middle Ages. The two methods most used by the Vikings were filigree and repoussé. The main themes in Viking jewelry are patterns of nature and animals, increasing in abstraction as the time period progressed. Later Viking jewelry also starts to exhibit simplistic geometric patterns. The most intricate Viking work recovered is a set of two bands from the 6th century in Alleberg, Sweden. Barbarian jewelry was very similar to that of the Vikings, having many of the same themes. Geometric and abstract patterns were present in much of barbarian art. Like other barbarian women Viking women needed jewelry to keep their clothes on, and were probably rarely seen without it.

== Techniques ==
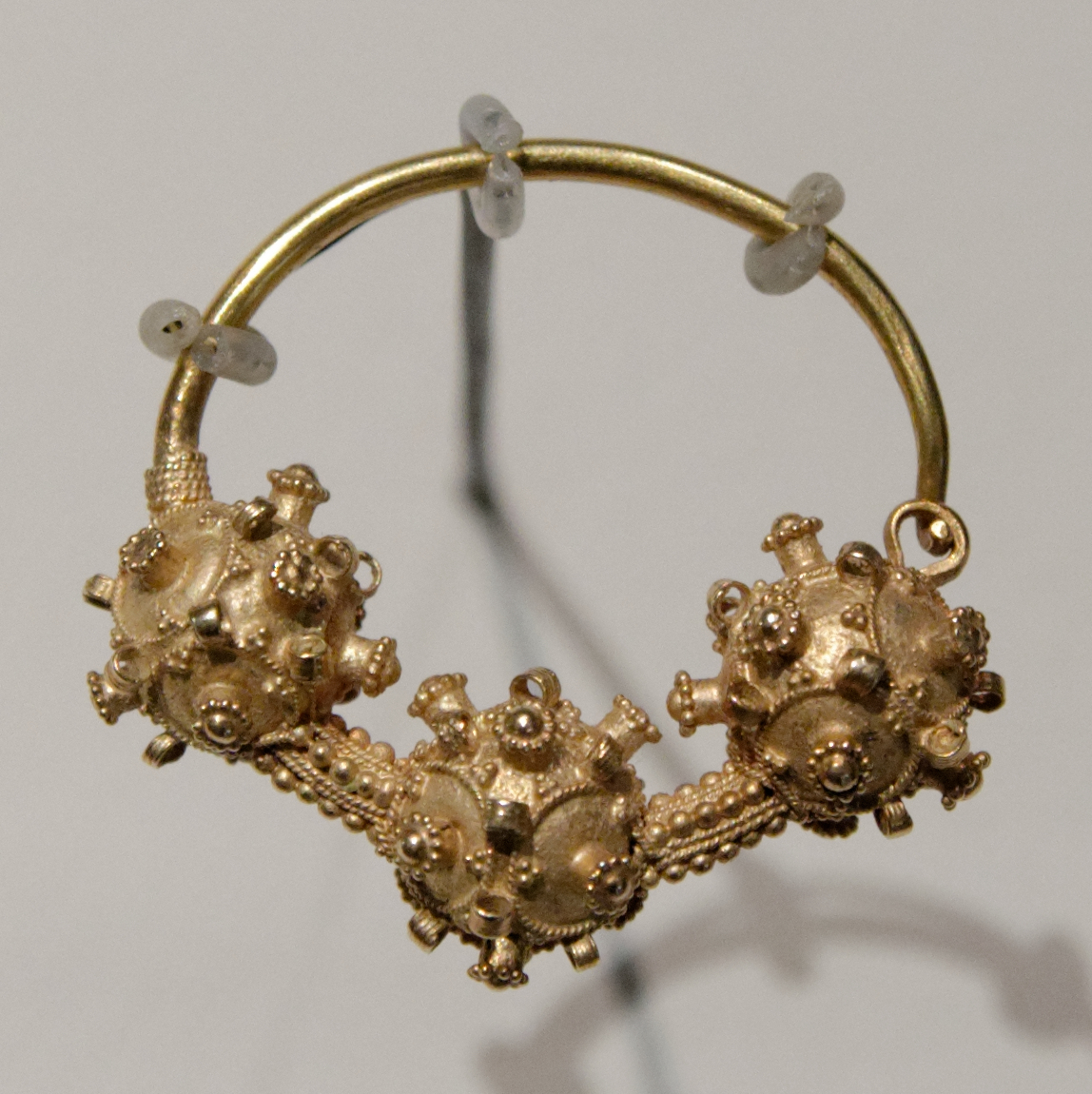
Gold earring found in Croatia, 1300–1350

Due to the established tradition from ancient times in combination with the knowledge of how to process gold in order to produce jewelry, the practice of gold being the base for all jewelry continued into the Middle Ages.

=== Soldering, plating and gilding ===
Goldsmiths used the techniques of soldering, plating and gilding to create a larger workable surface or to cover a secondary metal with a thin layer of gold for jewelry design. First, the goldsmith would start with a gold ingot, which would then be hammered into a sheet, a foil or a leaf of gold. Soldering is the process of joining multiple sheets of metal to create a single larger piece. The way this was achieved was by using a more impure form of gold – that is one with a higher percent of non-gold metals – as a joining tool. The higher the impurity of gold, the more quickly it will melt, and as such the impure gold would melt before the pure and could then be used to attach two or more pieces of purer gold. This would create a larger surface while retaining the thickness of the gold sheets. Gold sheets could be hammered to a higher level of fineness; gold foil was approximately the thickness of a piece of paper and gold leaf could be as thin as 0.005 millimeters. The process of plating involved gold foil being hammered or smoothed over a core of glass or another metal. Gilding used gold leaf adhered or pressed onto a base of terracotta or a metal such as copper. Both of these techniques allowed for jewelry to have the appearance and associated prestige of gold, without using solid gold which was rare and expensive.

=== Repoussé, inlay, enameling, filigree and granulation ===
Jewelers used delicate methods to achieve delicate metalwork. These methods involved more precise work intended to create ornamentation on jewelry. Repoussé was the process of laying a gold sheet on pitch and using concentrated pressure to form the pattern. Other materials, such as soft wood, lead and wax could also be used underneath the gold. Because these materials are malleable, they supported and held the gold in place while it was patterned and pushed into grooves in the base material to form the relief that created the jewelry. Two techniques that jewelers used to incorporate gems, glass and other metals into jewelry were inlay and enameling. The main difference between these methods is that inlay can refer to any material inserted into a design, whereas enamel refers specifically to pieces of a colored glass mixture put in place while melted. The decorative pieces would be inserted into a gold setting that had been shaped out of gold strips or molten glass could be poured into contours and recesses in the gold – known respectively as cloisonné and champlevé.

Filigree and granulation are two processes that are also closely related. They involve the decoration of a sheet of gold using the application of wires or grains of gold which can be worked into very intricate patterns. These techniques allowed for intense detail and delicacy because the wires or grains could easily be worked into twisted patterns and minuscule facets. All of these techniques enabled detailed work on gold jewelry, adding other materials or fine details.

== Sources ==
- Black, J. Anderson (1974). A History of Jewels. London: Orbis Publishing Limited.
- Cherry, John (2011). Medieval Goldsmiths (2nd ed.). The British Museum Press. ISBN 9780714128238.
- Evans, Helen C. (2004). Byzantium: faith and power (1261–1557). New York: The Metropolitan Museum of Art. ISBN 978-1588391131.
- S. McK. C. (1957). "Medieval sculpture and jewelry". Bulletin of the Associates in Fine Arts at Yale University. 23 (1/2): 11–13. JSTOR 40514039.
- Higgins, Reynold (1980). Greek and Roman Jewellery. London: Methuen & Co. Ltd. ISBN 9780416712100.
