= Mansions (band) =

American indie rock band

- Origin: Louisville, Kentucky
- Genres: Indie rock, alternative rock, emo
- Labels: Sophomore Lounge Records, Doghouse Records, King Bones Recordings, Burning House Records, Clifton Motel Records, Bad Timing Records
- Members: Christopher Browder; Robin Dove

Mansions is an American indie rock band from Louisville, Kentucky, currently residing in Seattle, Washington.

The group has performed and toured with Hellogoodbye, William Beckett, A Great Big Pile of Leaves, The Honorary Title, The Front Bottoms, I Can Make a Mess Like Nobody's Business, Look Mexico, Bayside, Now, Now, Paper Rival, Taking Back Sunday, The Get Up Kids, Pianos Become the Teeth, and La Dispute (band).

== History ==
=== Early years (2007–2008) ===
In 2007, they released their first full-length, eponymous album through Sophomore Lounge Records. It was completely self-produced, and includes early versions of several songs which were rerecorded for later releases.

In 2008, they released their eponymous EP which was their first release on Doghouse Records. The EP was intended as a teaser for their 2009 album, New Best Friends, as it included two tracks and two b-sides from the following album. Throughout 2008, Mansions released seven various EP's, remixes and acoustic versions of songs through many outlets. The first one they released was Remixed Best Pals, which included remixed versions of songs from New Best Friends, and it was released digitally through TheDailyChorus.com. The second EP they released was Acoustic Soft Ones, which contained many acoustic versions of previously recorded songs;also, they only released fifty copies of it on cassette. Following that release was Mr. Boddy, which included many new songs. The fourth release was The Original Demos, released as a MiniDisc and limited to twenty-five copies. Their fifth EP, Black Sheep, consisted of new tracks and was released digitally through StrikeGently.com. Their sixth release, When I Sleep, also contained various non-album tracks, but it was released on a MiniDisc and limited to fifty copies. The final release of 2008 was a single EP for Talk Talk Talk, which they released digitally through popwreckoning.com.

=== Record deal with Doghouse Records, Manbox, and New Best Friends (2009) ===
New Best Friends is considered to be the first "official Mansions" album. The record was produced, recorded, and mixed by Mike Sapone, who is most commonly known for his work with Taking Back Sunday, Brand New, and Straylight Run. The physical album includes a bonus disc titled The EP Initiative, which contains all of the songs from the mini-EP's released throughout 2008.

Also in 2009, Mansions and Brian Warren of Weatherbox released an eponymous EP under the moniker "Manbox". The release was limited to only 200 hand-painted copies. Also in 2009, Mansions released an EP titled Thyme Travel on cassette, limited to 100 copies.

=== Departure from Doghouse and Dig Up The Dead (2010–2011) ===
After the release of New Best Friends, the band parted ways with Doghouse Records. In an interview with Alternative Press, Browder concedes that "there was kind of a slow year while we were getting off of Doghouse. And even that first self-titled EP had more of a push than [New Best Friends] did, so it's kind of weird that more people have heard that EP than have heard that last album, probably." When the album was released, it received generally favorable reviews.

The band began demoing their second album in the early winter of 2009 through the early spring of 2010 in Winston-Salem, North Carolina. In April 2010, ten days were spent recording the majority of the record in Browder's parent's home in Louisville, Kentucky. Dig Up The Dead, Mansions' sophomore album, is the result of these sessions. The album was entirely self-produced, recorded, and mixed. The record was co-released by King Bones Recordings and Burning House Records. In an issue of Alternative Press, Browder stated that "if [the album] wasn't any good, then it probably just wouldn't even come out and no one would hear it." When the album was released, it received generally favorable reviews.

=== 2011–2012 ===
Mansions recorded a new song for a split 7-inch record with John Nolan of the band Taking Back Sunday.

Mansions also joined Taking Back Sunday on the ten-year anniversary of their debut album Tell All Your Friends.

=== Doom Loop (2013) ===
On November 12, 2013, Mansions released a new record entitled 'Doom Loop' on Clifton Motel Records. Written and recorded primarily in Browder's Capitol Hill apartment, the sound of Doom Loop was influenced by the constraints of the environment. Although it was technically flawed, the band's creative solutions led to the creation of one very loud record. After the basic tracking was completed, the band recruited John Momberg (Appleseed Cast, Koufax) to record the drums and Jim Vollentine (Spoon) to engineer them. Once the drums were recorded, Steve McDonald (Redd Kross, OFF!) finished the final mix.

While Christopher Browder was speaking of Doom Loop to Clifton Motel, he said the following: "I want this record to be a kick in the teeth. I want people to go listen to some other rock record they think is cool, and now that record sounds tame and turned down in comparison."

=== Deserter (2017) ===
After being out of the spotlight for some time the band released a single "Heel Theme." Soon after an EP called Deserter was released featuring this single as the first track.

=== Big Bad (2020) ===
On May 29, 2020, the band released their first single in three years, called "Black & White" for their forthcoming studio album, Big Bad. The full album was released on June 26, 2020, by Bad Timing Records.

=== Old Best Friends (2021) ===
Released on October 29, 2021, on Bad Timing Records. Old Best Friends is a career-spanning acoustic reimagining of twelve songs, picked from 2009's New Best Friends, 2010's Best of the Bees, 2011's Dig Up The Dead, 2013's Doom Loop, 2017's Deserter and 2020's Big Bad.

=== Tuff Luff (2023) ===
In August 2023 Mansions announced Tuff Luff, their first proper album since 2020's Big Bad. It was released October 6, 2023 via Bad Timing Records.

== Discography ==
=== Studio albums ===
- Mansions LP (2007)
- New Best Friends (2009)
- Dig Up The Dead (2011)
- Doom Loop (2013)
- Big Bad (2020)
- Tuff Luff (2023)

=== Compilations ===
- Best of the Bees (2010)
- Old Best Friends (2021)

=== Extended plays ===
- Mansions EP (2008)
- Remixed Best Pals (2008)
- Acoustic Soft Ones (2008)
- Mr. Boddy (2008)
- The Original Demos (2008)
- Black Sheep (2008)
- When I Sleep (2008)
- Manbox (Collaboration with Brian Warren of Weatherbox) (2009)
- Thyme Travel (2009)
- Fences/Mansions split 7-inch (2011)
- Deserter (2017)

=== Singles ===
- Talk Talk Talk - Single (2008)
- The Deeper Hurts Reign (Daytrotter Session) (2011)
- John Nolan/Mansions split 7-inch (2012)
