= Endpoint (band) =

American hardcore band

- Origin: Louisville, Kentucky, United States
- Genres: Hardcore punk; emo; melodic hardcore
- Years active: 1988–1994, 2010
- Labels: Slamdek; Conversion; Doghouse
- Past members: Rob Pennington; Duncan Barlow; Kyle Crabtree; Rusty Sohm; Jason Graff; Lee Fetzer; Chad Castetter; Pat McClimans

Endpoint was a hardcore band from Louisville, Kentucky. Many of their songs dealt with social and political issues.

The band was founded in 1988 as Deathwatch. They released only one record, posthumously in 1991, which was a split 7-inch with another local band named Crain. In 1988, the band changed their name and the following year, with most of the original line-up, released a 17-song album on cassette through the Slamdek Record Company label. The album, called If The Spirits Are Willing, was available in Louisville area stores in May 1989. However, following this release, the band got a new rhythm section and went on to write "In a Time of Hate," which was held up in production but was released in early 1991 on Conversion Records. The following year, the band released "Catharsis," on Doghouse Records. Endpoint released two more records and toured the United States extensively and Europe between 1992 and 1994.

In 1994, the band finally decided to call it quits after a seven-year career. On December 31, they played their last and largest show for over two thousand people in, of course, Louisville. In 1995, the band released their last record, appropriately entitled "The Last Record".

They reunited for two shows in 2010 as a benefit for Jason Noble of Rodan, who had been diagnosed with cancer.

A large number of Endpoint's songs were political. They have been described as having a "soaring pro-community message".

== Members ==
- Rob Pennington - vocals
- Duncan Barlow - Guitar
- Lee Fetzer - drums
- Rusty Sohm - drums
- Chad Castetter - Guitar
- Pat McClimans - Bass
- Kyle Crabtree - drums
- Kyle Noltemeyer - bass
- Jason Graff - bass
- Jason Hayden - bass
- Curtis Mead - bass
- David Wagenschutz - drums
- Ben Clark - bass
- Thommy Browne - drums

== Discography ==
=== Albums ===
- Crain and Deathwatch Split 7-inch - Slamdek
- If the Spirits Are Willing - Slamdek
- Endpoint and Sunspring Split 7-inch- Slamdek
- Endpoint and Sunspring Split 7-inch-Written in Rock: Songs of Rick Springfield - Slamdek
- EP2 7-inch - Break Even Point
- Idiots 7-inch/CD - Doghouse
- Every 26 Seconds 7-inch - Doghouse
- Slamdek Discography 1988-1991 - Slamdek
- In a Time of Hate - Conversion
- Catharsis - Doghouse
- After Taste - Doghouse
- The Last Record - Doghouse

== Sources ==
- Slamdek A to Z: The Illustrated History of Louisville's Slamdek Record Company 1986–1995 by K. Scott Ritcher
- http://history.louisvillehardcore.com/index.php?title=Endpoint
