= The Mansion, Berkhamsted =

Historic property in Berkhamsted, Hertfordshire, England

Coordinates: 51.76823°N 0.54681°W

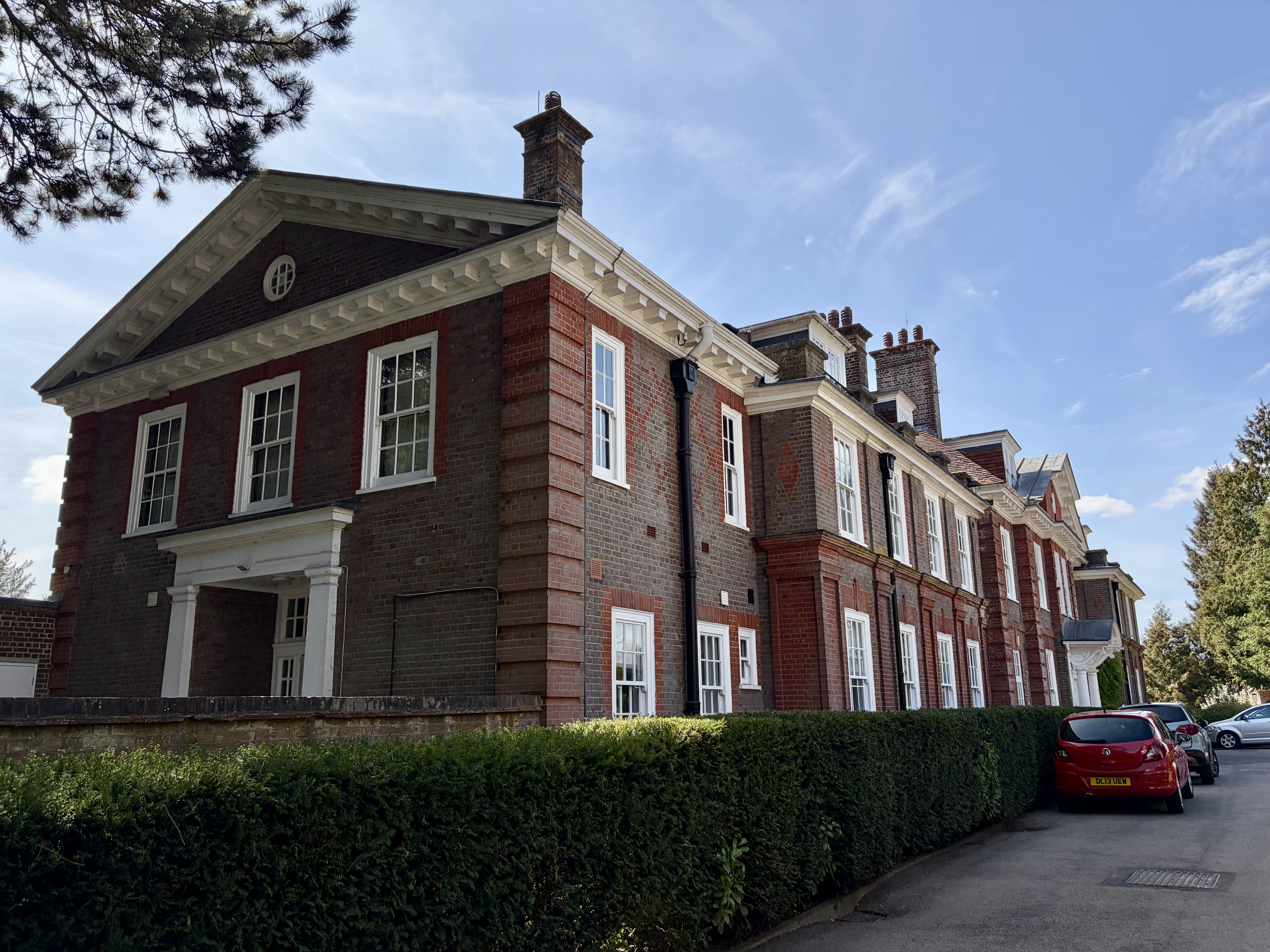
The Mansion, Berkhamsted

The Mansion, Berkhamsted is a historic property on Castle Hill in Berkhamsted. It is a Grade II Listed building.

== History ==
The house was designed by George Hubbard and built by H. and J. Matthews between 1906 and 1908 for Sir John Evans. Evans was a well known archaeologist and geologist who became President of the Geological Society of London. Evans called the house "Britwell" but, after his death 1908, it was bought by Sir Arthur Cory Wright, a businessman, who renamed it "Berkhamsted Hill".

The house was bought by the Deen family in 1919 and by Sir Richard Ashmole Cooper, a businessman, in 1937. After Cooper's death in 1946, the house was acquired by his family chemicals business which itself was bought by the Wellcome Trust in 1959. The house next came into the ownership of the Pitman-Moore Company, a pharmaceuticals business, who had no further use for it after 1991. Now known as "The Mansion", it became the centre point of a retirement facility known as "Castle Village" in 1999.
