= New Best Friends (album) =

Studio album by Mansions
- Released: March 3, 2009
- Genre: Indie rock
- Length: 42:46
- Label: Doghouse

Mansions chronology
Mansions EP (2008)	New Best Friends (2009)	Manbox (2009)

Alternative cover 1
- Vinyl Cover

Alternative cover 2
- "The EP Initiative" Cover

Professional ratings
Review scores
Source	Rating
AbsolutePunk.net	87%
Sputnikmusic	3/5 stars
Punknews	3/5 stars

New Best Friends is the official debut album by Mansions.

The album was produced, recorded and mixed by Mike Sapone (Brand New, Taking Back Sunday, Straylight Run). Mastering by Fred Kevorkian (Willie Nelson, The Apples In Stereo, Maroon 5, Joseph Arthur, The National, and more).

The physical copy of the album includes a bonus-disc known as "The EP Initiative", a compilation album containing tracks from seven different EP's released throughout 2008 through very limited formats.

The album was also pressed to vinyl by Sophomore Lounge Records, with only 250 copies made.

== Track listing ==
1. "I Told a Lie" - 1:09
2. "Talk Talk Talk" - 4:17
3. "Por Favor Is Spanish" - 3:43
4. "Holidaze" - 3:28
5. "Curacao Blue" - 4:29
6. "Insulated" - 4:29
7. "Take It Back" - 3:16
8. "Gotta Be Alone" - 3:38
9. "The Worst Part" - 3:27
10. "Substitute Angel" - 3:04
11. "Millions of Pieces" - 4:01
12. "All Eyes on You" - 3:51

Bonus Disc: The EP Initiative
No.	Title	Length
1.	"OMG"	3:52
2.	"I Swear"	4:00
3.	"Never Enuff"	3:27
4.	"Last To Leave"	3:51
5.	"LtsBSdTgthr"	3:35
6.	"When I Sleep"	4:06
7.	"Shoes On, Pants Off"	3:19
8.	"The Constant"	3:13
9.	"Seven Eleven"	1:08
10.	"18th B-Day"	2:22
11.	"You Got Caught"	3:50
12.	"When She's Not Around"	4:02
13.	"I Told a Lie" (Remix)	4:10
14.	"The Worst Part" (Remix)	3:46
15.	"Curacao Blue" (Remix)	4:03
16.	"Gotta Be Alone" (16)	3:50
17.	"All Eyes on You" (Remix)	3:23
18.	"Insulated" (Remix)	3:40
19.	"Talk Talk Talk" (Remix)	4:14
20.	"Substitute Angel" (Acoustic Version)	3:24
21.	"Take It Back" (Acoustic Version)	4:07
22.	"Por Favor Is Spanish" (Acoustic Version)	4:07
23.	"Millions of Pieces" (Acoustic Version)	3:57
24.	"Holidaze" (Acoustic Version)	4:15
25.	"Tangerine" (Acoustic Version)	4:21
26.	"The Worst Part" (Demo)	3:14
27.	"Gotta Be Alone" (Demo)	3:04
28.	"Por Favor Is Spanish" (Demo)	3:26
29.	"Substitute Angel" (Demo)	3:13
30.	"Millions of Pieces" (Demo)	3:49
31.	"Curacao Blue" (Demo)	4:22
32.	"I Told a Lie" (Demo)	4:02
33.	"All Eyes on You" (Demo)	1:32
34.	"Holidaze" (Demo)	4:20
35.	"Insulated" (Demo)	3:57
36.	"Take It Back" (Demo)	3:32
37.	"Tangerine" (Demo)	4:21
38.	"Talk Talk Talk" (Demo)	4:08

== Personnel ==
Band

- All songs written by Christopher Browder
- Christopher Browder - Vocals, Guitar, Keys, Bass, Percussion
- Anthony Brock - Drums, percussion (Except on "Millions of Pieces")

Technical

- Mike Sapone - Production, Mixing, Engineering.
- Fred Kevorkian - Mastering

Artwork

- Sarah Nelson - Design & Layout
