= Doghouse Records =

American record label

- Parent company: Warner Music Group
- Founded: 1987
- Founder: Dirk Hemsath
- Distributors: INgrooves; Mordam-Lumberjack; WEA
- Genre: Alternative rock; emotional hardcore; indie rock; melodic hardcore; pop punk; punk rock
- Country of origin: U.S.
- Location: New York City
- Official website: doghouserecords.com

Doghouse Records is an American record label currently based in New York City. The company was founded by Dirk Hemsath in late 1987 while living in Toledo, Ohio, in order to release the recordings of his hardcore band, Majority of One. The label originally specialized in midwest emo and melodic hardcore, though it eventually incorporated punk rock, pop punk, indie rock and alternative rock artists.

Doghouse Records was originally distributed through Lumberjack Distribution (also owned by Hemsath), then through the conglomerate Lumberjack Mordam Music Group (once Hemsath bought out Mordam), the latter of which signed a distribution deal with WEA in November 2004, which became effective on January 1, 2005. As part of the WAE deal, Hemsath negotiated an "upstream" clause to promote and develop select Doghouse Records bands to major record label Warner Music Group; as such, and through a financial agreement between the two parties, Doghouse Records became an affiliate of Warner Music Group. Later in 2005, Doghouse Records relocated to New York City.

In 2005, the label released a Bob Dylan tribute album, featuring bands on its roster as well as artists such as P.O.S and Sparta vocalist Jim Ward.

== Roster ==
This is a list of artists who have been signed by Doghouse Records.

- A Lot Like Birds
- The All-American Rejects
- Another Day Late
- Another Wall
- Army of Me
- As Friends Rust
- Josh Berwanger
- The Bigger Lights
- Bloodline
- The Break
- Cable
- Chamberlain
- Celebrity
- Coach
- Colossus of the Fall
- Contact
- Cruiserweight
- Danger Radio
- Adam Dove
- Eleven Eleven
- Endpoint
- Everyone Everywhere
- Fabric
- Face Value
- Falling Forward
- Favez
- Feable Weiner
- Fountainhead
- Gameface
- The Get Up Kids
- Grown Ups
- Hankshaw
- The Honorary Title
- Hot Water Music
- Husking Bee
- Into It. Over It.
- Jet Lag Gemini
- Joshua
- Jowls
- Koufax
- Lazycain
- Leftovers
- Let It Burn
- Lights
- Limbeck
- Majority of One
- Mansions
- Matt Pond PA
- Meg & Dia
- Metroschifter
- Minutes Too Far
- Mondo Primo
- Moods for Moderns
- Motion City Soundtrack
- David Moore
- My Hotel Year
- Naked Angels
- John Nolan
- Ocean of Mercy
- Omaha
- Paulson
- Push to Talk
- Radar Mercury
- Scott Ritcher
- River City High
- Romance on a Rocketship
- The Sad Riders
- Say Anything
- Schatzi
- Six Going On Seven
- Split Lip
- The Status
- Stronghold
- Sunday Driver
- These Enzymes
- Threadbare
- Tramlaw
- Transcend
- Kurt Travis
- Vineyard
- Weatherbox
- With the Punches
- You, Me, and Everyone We Know
- Young Statues

== See also ==
- Mordam Records
