= Taking Back Sunday discography =

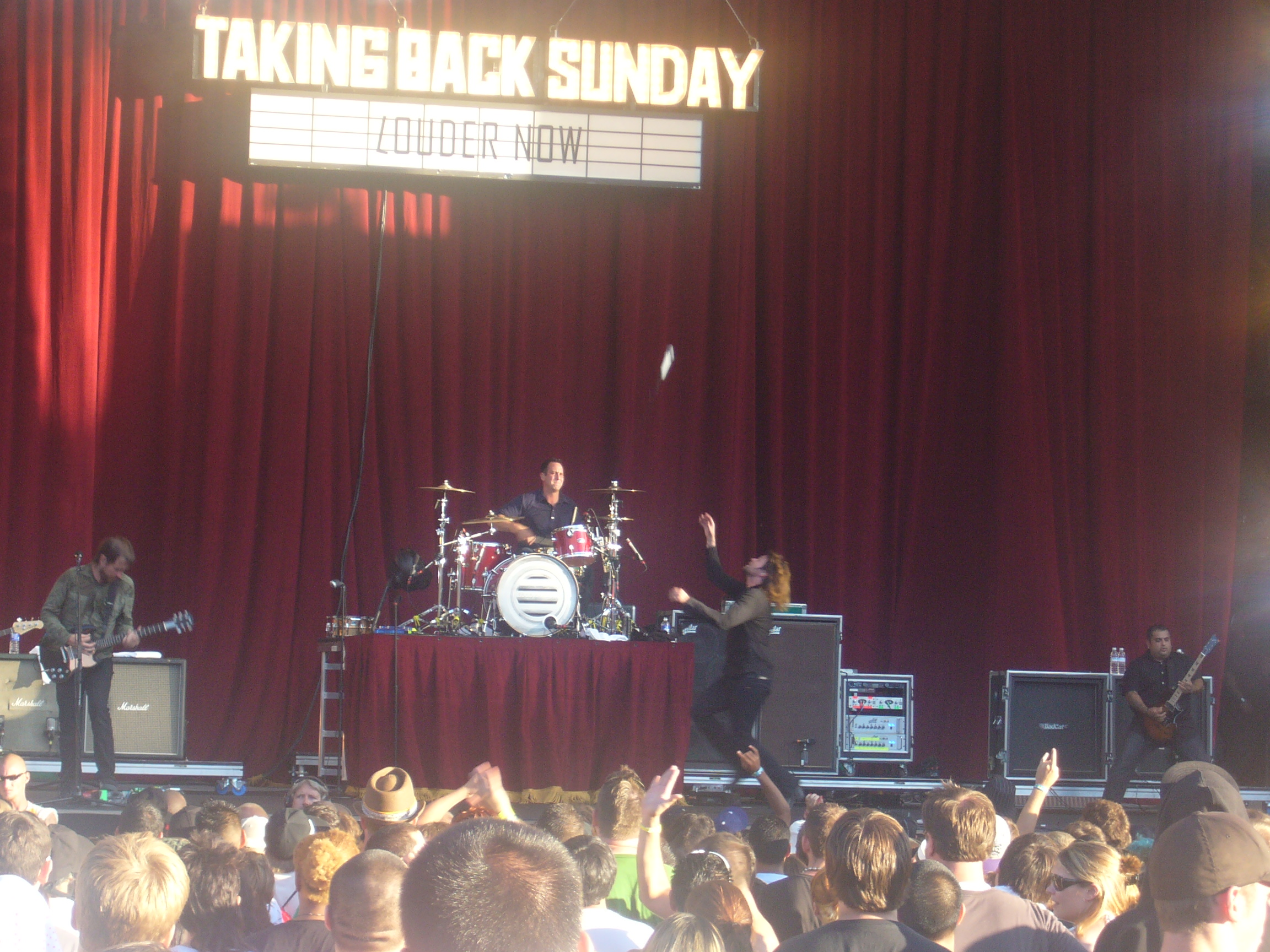
- Taking Back Sunday on the Projekt Revolution tour, August 19, 2007
- Studio albums: 8
- Extended plays: 3
- Live albums: 5
- Compilation albums: 1
- Singles: 22
- Video albums: 2
- Music videos: 22

The discography of Taking Back Sunday, an American rock band, consists of eight studio albums, 22 singles including one as a featured artist, three EPs and one compilation album.

== Albums ==
=== Studio albums ===
List of studio albums, with selected chart positions
Title	Album details	Peak chart positions									Sales	Certifications (sales thresholds)
Title	Album details	US	US Rock	AUS	CAN	IRL	JPN	SCO	UK	UK Rock	Sales	Certifications (sales thresholds)
Tell All Your Friends	Released: March 26, 2002; Label: Victory (VR176); Format: CD, CD+DVD-V, CS, DL, LP	183	—	—	—	—	—	—	—	—	WW: 1,000,000+; US: 790,000	RIAA: Platinum
Where You Want to Be	Released: July 27, 2004; Label: Victory (VR228); Format: CD, DL, LP	3	—	—	—	—	—	73	71	3	US: 700,000+	RIAA: Gold
Louder Now	Released: April 25, 2006; Label: Warner Bros. (9362-49424-2); Format: CD, CD+DVD-V, DL, LP	2	2	17	5	70	90	15	18	1	US: 674,000	RIAA: Gold; BPI: Silver
New Again	Released: June 2, 2009; Label: Warner Bros. (516894-2); Format: CD, CD+DVD-V, DL, LP	7	5	31	16	—	—	63	46	3	US: 125,000+	
Taking Back Sunday	Released: June 28, 2011; Label: Warner Bros. (527870-2); Format: CD, DL, LP	17	4	49	57	—	—	—	87	5	US: 27,000	
Happiness Is	Released: March 18, 2014; Label: Hopeless (HR791-2); Format: CD, DL, LP, 7" vinyl box set	10	4	94	—	—	—	87	53	2	US: 55,000+	
Tidal Wave	Released: September 16, 2016; Label: Hopeless; Format: CD, DL, LP	36	6	54	—	—	—	94	—	11		
152	Released: October 27, 2023; Label: Fantasy; Format: CD, DL, LP	—	—	—	—	—	—	62	—	—		
"—" denotes releases that did not chart or were not released in that territory.

=== Live albums ===
List of live albums
Title	Album details
The Louder Now DVD: PartTwo	Released: November 20, 2007; Label: Warner Bros. (339836); Format: CD+DVD-V, DL
Live from Bamboozle '09	Released: October 6, 2009; Label: Warner Bros.; Format: DL
Live from Orensanz	Released: August 13, 2010; Label: Warner Bros. (9362-49630-5); Format: CD, CD+DVD-V, DL
We Play Songs	Released: April 21, 2012; Label: Brookvale (BROOK-211); Format: 12" vinyl, DL
TAYF10 Acoustic	Released: June 18, 2013; Label: Sorry (SRY152); Format: DL, LP

=== Compilation albums ===
List of compilation albums
Title	Album details	Peak chart positions
Title	Album details	US
Notes from the Past	Released: October 30, 2007; Label: Victory (VR381); Format: CD, DL	141
Twenty	Released: January 11, 2019; Label: Craft, Concord; Format: CD, DL, LP	—

=== Video albums ===
List of video albums
Title	Album details
TAYF10 Acoustic	Released: June 18, 2013; Label: Sorry; Format: DVD-V, DL
TAYF10: Live from the Starland Ballroom	Released: December 10, 2013; Label: Sorry; Format: DVD-V, DL

== Extended plays ==
List of extended plays
Title	EP details
Taking Back Sunday	Released: 2000; Label: Self-released; Format: CD
Lullaby EP	Released: 2000; Label: Self-released; Format: CD
The Tell All Your Friends Demo	Released: February 2001; Label: Self-released; Format: CD

== Songs ==
=== Singles ===
==== As lead artist ====
Year	Title	Peak chart positions								Album
Year	Title	US	US Pop	US Alt.	US Rock	CAN Rock	SCO	UK	UK Rock	Album
2002	"Great Romances of the 20th Century"	—	—	—	—	—	—	—	33	Tell All Your Friends
2003	"Cute Without the 'E' (Cut from the Team)"	—	—	—	—	—	—	—	—	Tell All Your Friends
2003	"You're So Last Summer"	—	—	—	—	—	—	—	—	Tell All Your Friends
2004	"A Decade Under the Influence"	—	—	16	—	—	79	70	9	Where You Want to Be
2005	"This Photograph Is Proof (I Know You Know)"	—	—	—	—	—	—	—	—	Music from and Inspired by Spider-Man 2 / Where You Want to Be
2006	"MakeDamnSure"	48	41	8	—	36	28	36	1	Louder Now
2006	"Twenty-Twenty Surgery"	—	—	—	—	—	45	60	1	Louder Now
2006	"Liar (It Takes One to Know One)"	—^{[A]}	—	21	—	—	65	83	—	Louder Now
2006	"What's It Feel Like to Be a Ghost?"	—	—	—	—	—	—	—	—	Louder Now
2007	"My Blue Heaven"	—	—	—	—	—	—	—	—	Louder Now
2009	"Carpathia"	—	—	—	—	—	—	—	—	New Again
2009	"Sink into Me"	—	—	10	32	34	—	—	19	New Again
2009	"New Again"	—	—	—	—	—	—	—	—	New Again
2009	"Where My Mouth Is"	—	—	—	—	—	—	—	—	New Again
2010	"Winter Passing"	—	—	—	—	—	—	—	—	Non-album single
2011	"Faith (When I Let You Down)"	—	—	—	—	—	—	—	28	Taking Back Sunday
2011	"This Is All Now"	—	—	—	—	—	—	—	—	Taking Back Sunday
2011	"You Got Me"	—	—	—	—	—	—	—	—	Taking Back Sunday
2014	"Flicker, Fade"	—	—	—	—	—	—	—	—	Happiness Is
2014	"Stood a Chance"	—	—	—	—	—	—	—	—	Happiness Is
2016	"Tidal Wave"	—	—	—	—	—	—	—	—	Tidal Wave
2022	"Just Us Two" (with Steve Aoki)	—	—	—	—	—	—	—	—	Hiroquest: Genesis
2023	"The One"	—	—	—	—	—	—	—	—	152
2023	"S'old"	—	—	19	—	—	—	—	—	152
"—" denotes a release that did not chart.

Notes

- A. "Liar (It Takes One to Know One)" did not chart on the US Billboard Hot 100, but peaked at no. 12 on the Bubbling Under Hot 100 chart.

==== As featured artist ====
List of singles, with selected chart positions
Title	Year	Peak chart positions			Album
Title	Year	US Alt	US Rock /Alt	CAN Rock	Album
"Loved You a Little" (The Maine feat. Taking Back Sunday & Charlotte Sands)	2022	8	14	46	Non-album single

=== Original compilation appearances ===
Year	Album	Contributed song
2002	Victory Style Vol. 5	"The Ballad of Sal Villanueva"
2003	Beer: The Movie	"Your Own Disaster" (original version)
2003	Punk Goes Acoustic	"Cute Without the 'E' (Cut from the Team)" (acoustic)
2003	Warped Tour 2003 Tour Compilation	"Your Own Disaster"
2004	Spider-Man 2: Music from and Inspired by	"This Photograph Is Proof (I Know You Know)"
2004	In Honor: A Compilation to Beat Cancer	"You're So Last Summer" (acoustic)
2005	Fantastic 4: The Album	"Error Operator" (original version)
2005	Tony Hawk's American Wasteland	"Suburban Home" / "I Like Food" (Descendents cover medley)
2006	Live Promo Split	"MakeDamnSure" (live in Chicago)
2006	Acoustic Live & Rare 2006	"MakeDamnSure" (acoustic)
2009	Covered, A Revolution in Sound	"You Wreck Me" (Tom Petty cover)
2017	Music for Everyone – A Compilation to Benefit the ACLU	"Just a Man"
2017	Green Day: The Early Years	"She" (Green Day cover)
2019	Punk Goes Acoustic Vol. 3	"A Decade Under the Influence" (acoustic)

== Videography ==
Year	Song	Director
2002	"Great Romances of the 20th Century"	Christian Winters
2002	"Cute Without the 'E' (Cut from the Team)"	Christian Winters
2003	"Timberwolves at New Jersey"	Unknown
2003	"You're So Last Summer"	Christian Winters
2004	"A Decade Under the Influence"	Adam Levite
2004	"This Photograph Is Proof (I Know You Know)"	Tom DeLonge
2005	"Set Phasers to Stun"	Unknown
2006	"MakeDamnSure"	Marc Klasfeld
2006	"Twenty-Twenty Surgery"	Jay Martin
2006	"Liar (It Takes One to Know One)"	Tony Petrossian
2009	"Sink into Me"	Travis Kopach
2011	"El Paso"	Steve Pedulla
2011	"Faith (When I Let You Down)"	Chris Marrs Piliero
2011	"You Got Me"	Unknown
2012	"This Is All Now"	Greg Hunter and Josh Romero
2014	"Flicker, Fade"	DJay Brawner
2014	"Stood a Chance"	Evan Spencer Brace
2014	"All the Way"	Mark O'Connell and Megan Thompson
2015	"Better Homes and Gardens"	DJay Brawner
2016	"Tidal Wave"	Greg Hunter
2016	"You Can't Look Back"	DJay Brawner
2017	"Call Come Running"	DJay Brawner
2018	"All Ready to Go"	Manuel Casares & Antonio Corral
2023	"The One"	DJay Brawner
2023	"S'old"	DJay Brawner
