= Twenty (Taking Back Sunday album) =

Compilation album by Taking Back Sunday
- Released: January 11, 2019
- Genre: Emo; post-hardcore
- Length: 1:18:20
- Label: Craft, Concord

Taking Back Sunday chronology
| Tidal Wave (2016) | Twenty (2019) | 152 (2023) |

Professional ratings
Aggregate scores
| Source | Rating |
|---|---|
| Metacritic | 86/100 |
Review scores
| Source | Rating |
| AllMusic | 4/5 stars |
| Exclaim! | 5/10 |
| Kerrang! | 5/5 stars |
| Punk News | 4/5 stars |

Twenty is a compilation album by American rock band Taking Back Sunday, released on January 11, 2019, through Craft Recordings. Its release marks the band's 20th anniversary, and it includes two new recordings, "All Ready to Go", and "A Song for Dan". The band embarked on a world tour in support of the album.

== Track listing ==
| No. | Title | Original release | Length |
|---|---|---|---|
| 1. | "Cute Without the 'E' (Cut from the Team)" | Tell All Your Friends (2002) | 3:33 |
| 2. | "You're So Last Summer" | Tell All Your Friends | 3:01 |
| 3. | "Timberwolves at New Jersey" | Tell All Your Friends | 3:25 |
| 4. | "A Decade Under the Influence" | Where You Want to Be (2004) | 4:08 |
| 5. | "Set Phasers to Stun" | Where You Want to Be | 3:04 |
| 6. | "One-Eighty by Summer" | Where You Want to Be | 3:55 |
| 7. | "Liar (It Takes One to Know One)" | Louder Now (2006) | 3:11 |
| 8. | "MakeDamnSure" | Louder Now | 3:32 |
| 9. | "What's It Feel Like to Be a Ghost?" | Louder Now | 3:44 |
| 10. | "My Blue Heaven" | Louder Now | 4:09 |
| 11. | "Sink into Me" | New Again (2009) | 3:04 |
| 12. | "Everything Must Go" | New Again | 4:42 |
| 13. | "Faith (When I Let You Down)" | Taking Back Sunday (2011) | 3:09 |
| 14. | "Call Me in the Morning" | Taking Back Sunday | 3:59 |
| 15. | "Flicker, Fade" | Happiness Is (2014) | 4:34 |
| 16. | "Better Homes and Gardens" | Happiness Is | 3:54 |
| 17. | "Tidal Wave" | Tidal Wave (2016) | 2:34 |
| 18. | "You Can't Look Back" | Tidal Wave | 4:29 |
| 19. | "Call Come Running" | Tidal Wave | 3:14 |
| 20. | "All Ready to Go" | Previously unreleased | 3:59 |
| 21. | "A Song for Dan" | Previously unreleased | 4:59 |

Bonus 10" vinyl – Artist's Picks
| No. | Title | Original release | Length |
|---|---|---|---|
| 1. | "Death Wolf" (Mark O'Connell's pick) | Tidal Wave | 4:12 |
| 2. | "All the Way" (Adam Lazzara's pick) | Happiness Is | 3:48 |
| 3. | "Fences" (John Nolan's pick) | Tidal Wave | 3:37 |
| 4. | "It Takes More" (Shaun Cooper's pick) | Happiness Is | 5:11 |

== Personnel ==
Taking Back Sunday

- Adam Lazzara – lead vocals (all tracks)
- John Nolan – lead guitar, keyboards, vocals (tracks, 1–3; 13–21)
- Shaun Cooper – bass guitar (tracks, 1–3; 13–21)
- Mark O'Connell – drums, percussion (all tracks)
- Eddie Reyes – rhythm guitar (tracks 1–19)
- Fred Mascherino – lead guitar, vocals (tracks, 4–10)
- Matt Rubano – bass guitar (tracks, 4–12)
- Matthew Fazzi – lead guitar, keyboards, vocals (tracks, 11–12)

Production

- Mastered by Ted Jensen at Sterling Sound, Nashville
- Vinyl cut by Joe Nino-Hernes at Sterling Sound, Nashville
- Tracks 1 to 3 produced by Sal Villanueva
- Tracks 4 to 6 produced by Lou Giordano
- Tracks 7 to 10 and 13 to 14 produced by Eric Valentine
- Tracks 11 and 12 produced by David Kahne and Matt Squire
- Tracks 15 and 16 produced by Marc Jacob Hudson and Mike Sapone
- Tracks 17 to 19 produced by Mike Sapone

== Charts ==
Chart performance for Twenty
| Chart (2019) | Peak position |
|---|---|
| UK Rock & Metal Albums (OCC) | 34 |
