= Sink into Me =

Single by Taking Back Sunday

from the album New Again
- Released: April 27, 2009
- Recorded: 2008
- Genre: Post-hardcore, pop punk
- Length: 3:03
- Label: Warner Bros.
- Songwriters: Matthew Fazzi, Adam Lazzara, Mark O'Connell, Eddie Reyes, Matt Rubano
- Producers: David Kahne, Matt Squire

Taking Back Sunday singles chronology
"Carpathia" (2009)	"Sink into Me" (2009)	"New Again" (2009)

"Sink into Me" is a song by American rock band Taking Back Sunday. It was released as a single on April 27, 2009. The song impacted radio on April 28. The song is featured on the band's fourth album, New Again, which was released on June 2, 2009. The music video was released on May 11, 2009 on MTV.com, MTV2, MTVU and MTV Hits.

On June 2, the day New Again was released, "Sink into Me" was performed on Jimmy Kimmel Live!. The band performed with a third guitarist, Isaac Bolivar, as well as having backing vocals and handclaps supplied by members of Envy on the Coast and Anberlin. The backing vocalists all donned yellow T-shirts with the phrase "I USED TO BE IN TAKING BACK SUNDAY" on them - a reference to the constant line-up changes the band has undergone. Despite the success of the single, since the reunion of the Tell All Your Friends lineup, the song has often been left off setlists.

== Track listing ==
CD single

1. "Sink into Me" – 3:03

iTunes

1. "Sink into Me" – 3:03
2. "Catholic Knees [26th Street Shakedown] Version" – 3:09

== Music video ==
The music video for "Sink into Me" begins with slow motion of Adam Lazzara's face and the band performing in front of an audience in an undisclosed location. During the performance a black, glue-like liquid begins to drip from the ceiling and the band is slowly "sinking" into the stage, which is descending. The music video ends with Adam fully sinking into the glue and throwing the drum kit.

Directed by Travis Kopach. Casting was set in Brooklyn, NY and the audience is made up of fans wishing to partake in the video.

== Chart performance ==
"Sink into Me" became Taking Back Sunday's second top-ten hit on the Billboard Alternative Songs chart (after "MakeDamnSure"), reaching number ten, and was their last single to appear on the chart until their 2023 single, "S'old". It was also their first entry on Billboard's new Rock Songs chart, where it reached number thirty-two.

== Charts ==
Chart (2009)	Peak position
Canada Rock (Billboard)	34
US Alternative Songs (Billboard)	10
US Rock Songs (Billboard)	32
