= A Decade Under the Influence =

A Decade Under the Influence may refer to:

- "A Decade Under the Influence" (song), by Taking Back Sunday
- A Decade Under the Influence (film), a 2003 American documentary film
