= Liar (disambiguation) =

A liar is a person who tells lies.

Liar may also refer to:

== People with the name ==
- The Liar, an American video artist and member of Angelspit

== Arts, entertainment, and media ==
=== Films ===
- The Liar (1961 film), West German film directed by Ladislao Vajda
- The Liar (1981 film), Finnish film directed by Mika Kaurismäki
- The Liars (film), 1996 French film
- Liar (1997 film) (UK title for Deceiver)

=== Literature ===
- Liar (novel), a 2009 novel by Justine Larbalestier
- "Liar!" (short story), a 1941 short story by Isaac Asimov
- The Liar (Corneille play), a 1644 play by Pierre Corneille
- The Liar (novel), a 1991 novel by Stephen Fry
- "The Liar" (novella), a 2016 short story by John P. Murphy
- "The Liar" (short story), a short story by Henry James

=== Music ===
==== Albums ====
- Liar (Harisu album), 2002
- Liar (The Jesus Lizard album), 1992
- L.I.A.R., a 2016 album by Keri Hilson
- Liar/Dead Is the New Alive, a 2006 EP by Emilie Autumn
- Liars (Liars album), 2007
- Liars (Todd Rundgren album), 2004
- LIAR (Love Isn't a Right), a 2025 album by Tanita Tikaram

==== Songs ====
- "Liar" (Britney Spears song), 2016
- "Liar" (Camila Cabello song), 2019
- "Liar" (The Damned song), 1977
- "Liar" (Egypt Central song), 2011
- "Liar" (Eskimo Joe song), 2002
- "Liar" (Frans song), 2017
- "Liar" (Jelly Roll song), 2024
- "Liar" (Madcon song), 2008
- "Liar" (New Order song), 1993
- "Liar" (Profyle song), 2000
- "Liar" (Queen song), 1973
- "Liar" (Rollins Band song), 1994
- "Liar" (Russ Ballard song), a song written by Russ Ballard, recorded by Three Dog Night in 1970
- "Liar" (Silia Kapsis song), 2024
- "Liar", by Bikini Kill from Revolution Girl Style Now!
- "Liar", by Bros from Push
- "Liar", by Built To Spill from You in Reverse
- "Liar", by The Cranberries from Everybody Else Is Doing It, So Why Can't We?
- "Liar", by Emilie Autmn from Opheliac
- "Liar", by (G)I-dle from I Never Die
- "Liar", by Ill Niño from their 2001 album Revolution Revolución
- "Liar", by Korn from See You on the Other Side
- "Liar", by Lȧȧz Rockit from Left for Dead
- "Liar", by Lovebites from Awakening from Abyss
- "Liar", by Megadeth from So Far, So Good... So What!
- "Liar", by Papa Roach from Ego Trip
- "Liar", by Paramore from This Is Why
- "Liar", by the Sex Pistols from Never Mind the Bollocks, Here's the Sex Pistols
- "Liar", by Yngwie J. Malmsteen from Trilogy (Yngwie Malmsteen album)
- "Liar (It Takes One to Know One)", by Taking Back Sunday

==== Other uses in music ====
- Liars (band), an American indie rock band

=== Television ===
- "The Liar" (Prison Break), 2017 television series episode
- Liar (TV series), 2017 British made miniseries
- Liar, a 2002 UK quiz show hosted by Paul Kaye

=== Theatre ===
- The Liar (Corneille play), a 1644 play by Pierre Corneille
- The Liar (Goldoni play), a 1750 play by Carlo Goldoni
- The Liar (musical), a 1950 musical based on Goldoni's play, written and directed by Alfred Drake starring Walter Matthau
- The Liars (play), a play by Henry Arthur Jones

== See also ==
- Lair (disambiguation)
- Layar LRT Station
- Liar Liar (disambiguation)
- Liar paradox, one of the classical paradoxes of logic
- Lier (disambiguation)
- Lyre (disambiguation)
