= Lier =

Lier may refer to:

- Lier, Belgium
- Lier, Norway
- De Lier, Netherlands
- Li Er, also known as Laozi, a Chinese philosopher
- Li Er (novelist), a Chinese novelist

== See also ==
- Leer (disambiguation)
- Leer, Michigan, hamlet in Long Rapids Township, Michigan, USA named after Lier, Norway
- Liar (disambiguation)
