= Pants on Fire =

Pants on Fire may refer to:

== Film and television ==
- Pants on Fire (film), a 2014 American television film
- Pants on Fire, a 2019 British television programme presented by Emma Willis

=== Episodes ===
- "Pants on Fire" (A.N.T. Farm), 2013
- "Pants on Fire" (Dream On), 1991
- "Pants on Fire" (Everybody Loves Raymond), 1999
- "Pants on Fire" (The Good Wife), 2012
- "Pants on Fire" (Little Mosque on the Prairie), 2010
- "Pants on Fire" (Mary-Kate and Ashley in Action!), 2002
- "Pants on Fire" (Not Going Out), 2018
- "Liar, Liar Pants on Fire", The Real Housewives of Johannesburg, 2019

== Literature ==
- Pants on Fire (novel), a 2007 novel by Meg Cabot
- Pants on Fire, a 2010 novel by Simon Cheshire
- Pants on Fire, a 1995 play by Ken Garnhum

== Songs ==
- "Liar, Liar (The Castaways song)" 1965
- "Pants on Fire (Liar, Liar)", a 1991 song by Kix from Hot Wire
- "Pants on Fire", a 2001 song by Buck 65 from Man Overboard
- "Pants on Fire", a 2008 song by Something with Numbers from Engineering the Soul

== Other uses ==
- Pants On Fire (horse) (foaled 2008), an American Thoroughbred racehorse
- Pants on Fire, a truthfulness rating used by PolitiFact.com

== See also ==
- Liar Liar (disambiguation)
- Pant on Fire, a 2011 comedy show by Sorabh Pant
- Skipping-rope rhyme
