= Liar Liar (disambiguation) =

Liar Liar is a 1997 Jim Carrey film.

Liar Liar may also refer to:

== Music ==
- "Liar! Liar!", a song by B'z
- "Liar Liar" (Cris Cab song)
- "Liar, Liar" (The Castaways song), a song covered by Debbie Harry
- "Liar Liar", a 2013 song by Avicii from True
- "Liar Liar" (Christina Grimmie song), 2011
- "Liar, Liar", a 2007 song by A Fine Frenzy from One Cell in the Sea
- "Liar, Liar", a 2008 song by In Fiction from The Forecast
- "Liar Liar", a 2016 song by Oh My Girl from Pink Ocean
- "Liar Liar", a 2025 song by @onefive from More Than Kawaii
- "Liar Liar (Burn in Hell)", a 2007 song by the Used from Lies for the Liars
- "Liar Liar GE2017", a 2017 song by Captain SKA

== Literature ==
- Liar, Liar (novel series), a Japanese light novel series
- Liar × Liar, a Japanese manga series by Renjūrō Kindaichi
- "Liar, Liar", a storyline in the science fiction comedy webtoon series Live with Yourself!

== See also ==
- Liar, Liar (1993 film), a television film
- Liar (disambiguation)
- Pants on Fire (disambiguation)
