= Loved You a Little =

Single by The Maine featuring Taking Back Sunday and Charlotte Sands
- Released: January 27, 2022
- Studio: 8123 Studios
- Genre: Pop punk
- Label: 8123; Photo Finish
- Songwriters: John O'Callaghan; Garrett Nickelsen; Pat Kirch; Jared Monaco; Kennedy Brock
- Producers: The Maine; Matt Keller

The Maine singles chronology
"Pretender" (2021)	"Loved You a Little" (2022)	"Box in a Heart" (2022)

Music video
- "Loved You a Little" on YouTube

"Loved You a Little" is a song by American rock band, The Maine. The song features Charlotte Sands and Adam Lazzara of Taking Back Sunday. It was available for pre-order on January 21, 2022, before it was officially released on January 27. The song was serviced to alternative radio on February 8, 2022. The song peaked at number eight on the US Alternative Airplay chart and at number 14 on the US Rock & Alternative chart.

== Background ==
"Loved You a Little" has been described as a "break-up anthem". John O'Callaghan spoke about the meaning of the song in an interview with Alternative Press stating, "This song is for anyone feeling like they wasted their time on a feeling." O'Callaghan also stated while writing "Loved You a Little, he wanted Adam Lazzara on the track and even wrote his parts before he could say no. O'Callaghan wanted to trade off singing parts, as if they "were both telling the same story but from different perspectives." The group had never done something like that before, which presented itself with what the band described, "a new set of challenges." This is the second time The Maine has worked with Taking Back Sunday after their cover of Girls Just Want To Have Fun.

Lazarra said that he was "excited" when the band reached out about the collaboration as he needed, "something to do." Charlotte Sands who was also featured on the song, called it an "honor" to be a part of the track and collaborating with the Maine and Adam Lazarra, who she cites as her two biggest inspirations.

The band teamed up with Alternative Press and released a limited edition red heart flexi-disc single of the song in April 2022. An acoustic version of the song was released on May 20, 2022.

== Critical reception ==
Tamara May of Wall of Sound stated that the track, "will no doubt pull at your insecurities and emotions over that last situationship that had you overindulge just a little too much." She also compared Charlotte Sands to the likes of Billie Eilish.

== Music video ==
The music video was directed by Lupe Bustos. It was released on January 28, 2022.

== Track listing ==
Digital download
No.	Title	Length
1.	"Loved You a Little"	3:27

Acoustic version
No.	Title	Length
1.	"Loved You a Little" (acoustic)	3:24
2.	"Loved You a Little"	3:27

== Personnel ==
Credits for "Loved You a Little" adapted from AllMusic.

The Maine

- John O'Callaghan – vocals
- Jared Monaco – lead guitar
- Kennedy Brock – rhythm guitar
- Garrett Nickelsen – bass
- Pat Kirch – drums

Additional musicians

- Charlotte Sands – vocals
- Adam Lazzara – vocals

Production

- John O'Callaghan – producer
- Matt Keller – mastering engineer, producer

== Charts ==
=== Weekly charts ===
Weekly chart performance for "Loved You a Little"
Chart (2022)	Peak position
Canada Rock (Billboard)	46
US Rock & Alternative Airplay (Billboard)	14

=== Year-end charts ===
Year-end chart performance for "Loved You a Little"
Chart (2022)	Position
US Alternative Airplay (Billboard)	28

== Release history ==
Release dates and formats for "Loved You a Little"
Region	Date	Format	Version	Label	Ref.
Various	January 27, 2022	Digital download	Main	8123	
United States	February 8, 2022	Alternative radio	Main	Photo Finish	
Various	May 20, 2022	Digital download	Acoustic	8123	
