= 152 (album) =

Studio album by Taking Back Sunday
- Released: October 27, 2023
- Genre: Alternative rock, pop rock
- Length: 31:11
- Label: Fantasy
- Producer: Tushar Apte

Taking Back Sunday chronology
Twenty (2019)	152 (2023)

Singles from 152
- 1. "The One" Released: June 30, 2023; 2. "S'old" Released: August 30, 2023; 3. "Amphetamine Smiles" Released: September 27, 2023; 4. "Keep Going" Released: October 25, 2023

152 is the eighth studio album by American rock band Taking Back Sunday, released on October 27, 2023, through Fantasy Records, their first album for the label. Its release follows seven years after its predecessor, Tidal Wave (2016), marking the band's longest gap between studio albums to date. It was produced by Tushar Apte and preceded by four singles: "The One", "S'old", "Amphetamine Smiles", and "Keep Going". It is also the band's first album without guitarist Eddie Reyes, who left in 2018, and the last album with drummer Mark O'Connell, who left in December 2024.

== Background ==
The album was written "in the aftermath" of the COVID-19 pandemic, with frontman Adam Lazzara stating that the album "draw[s] from the musical influences [the band] all have, which have only gotten broader over the years. It means there's a lot of fun stuff", including more pop-influenced material.

The album name comes from an inside joke within the band and their friends; exit 152 is where the band members would meet their friends before performing. 152 has been featured on the cover for every Taking Back Sunday album.

== Critical reception ==
Professional ratings
Review scores
Source	Rating
The AU Review	3.5/5
Dork	3/5 stars
Kerrang!	4/5
Sputnikmusic	2.5/5
Wall of Sound	8/10
XS Noize	4/5 stars

Mischa Pearlman of Kerrang! stated that the album is "a stunning set of songs that truly defies the band's age, as much as it's been informed and inspired by all the years in between" and "the perfect bridge between past and present" versions of the band. Kelsey Trevan of Wall of Sound found the album to be "an emotional and musical rollercoaster that goes from melancholic, to upbeat, to melancholic, to making you want to dance" and called it "a great showcase of what the band used to be, what they are now, and what they could become in the future".

Reviewing the album for Dork, Alexander Bradley wrote that "the familiar Taking Back Sunday are still under the surface; you just have to dig a little deeper. There are moments it all comes together, like in the fanfare of 'The Stranger', but they're not quite as often as the albums of old. It's an extraordinary album, an unexpected turn and shows Taking Back Sunday have plenty of life in them yet". An emeritus review from Sputnikmusic summarized the album as "a fresh sheen of busy production and a 10-song tracklist which blurs by in barely more than half an hour, Adam Lazzara sounding like a man a decade younger with some generous helping of pitch correction and shorter songs" and also felt that "the highs and lows of their collaboration with Apte result in something more uneven".

== Track listing ==
All tracks are written by Shaun Cooper, Adam Lazzara, John Nolan, and Mark O'Connell, except where noted.

152 track listing
No.	Title	Writer(s)	Length
1.	"Amphetamine Smiles"		3:06
2.	"S'old"	Cooper; Lazzara; Nolan; O'Connell; Tushar Apte	2:43
3.	"The One"		3:17
4.	"Keep Going"		3:12
5.	"I Am the Only One Who Knows You"		3:08
6.	"Quit Trying"	Cooper; Lazzara; Nolan; O'Connell; Nathan Cogan Post	3:15
7.	"Lightbringer"		2:48
8.	"New Music Friday"		3:15
9.	"Juice 2 Me"		3:14
10.	"The Stranger"		3:14
Total length:			31:11

== Personnel ==
Taking Back Sunday

- Shaun Cooper – bass guitar (all tracks), engineering (track 3)
- Adam Lazzara – vocals (all tracks), lyrics (tracks 2, 6, 7) engineering (track 3)
- John Nolan – background vocals (all tracks), guitar (tracks 1–5, 7–10), lyrics (tracks 1, 3–5, 8–10) engineering (3), strings (6)
- Mark O'Connell – drums (all tracks), engineering (track 3)

Additional contributors

- Tushar Apte – production (all tracks), engineering (tracks 1, 3, 4–10)
- Ted Jensen – mastering
- Neal Avron – mixing
- Kyle Black – engineering (tracks 1, 2, 7, 8)
- Zack Sisco – engineering (tracks 1, 2, 7, 8)
- Matt Keller – engineering (track 4)
- Alec Eitrem – engineering (tracks 5, 9, 10)
- Raoul Ahmad – engineering (tracks 5, 9, 10)
- Nick Montopoli – strings (track 1)
- Nathan Cogan Post – piano (track 6)

== Charts ==
Chart performance for 152
Chart (2023)	Peak position
Scottish Albums (Official Charts)	62
UK Album Downloads (Official Charts)	59
US Top Album Sales (Billboard)	36
