= Leer =

Leer may refer to:

- Leer, Lower Saxony, town in Germany
  - Leer (district), containing the town in Lower Saxony, Germany
  - Leer (Ostfriesland) railway station
- Leer, South Sudan, town in South Sudan
  - Leer County, an administrative division of Unity State in South Sudan
- Leer, Michigan, a small hamlet within Long Rapids Township, Michigan, USA
- Leer (Horstmar), village in North Rhine-Westphalia, Germany, part of Horstmar
- Leer-3 (RB-341V), Russian weapon
- Leer, a form of looking

== See also ==
- Lear (disambiguation)
- Lier (disambiguation)
- Leers, Nord, France
- Van Leer (surname)
