= Louder Now =

Studio album by Taking Back Sunday
- Released: April 25, 2006
- Recorded: September 2005 – January 2006
- Studios: Barefoot, Los Angeles, California
- Genres: Alternative rock; pop-punk; emo; emo pop
- Length: 45:38
- Label: Warner Bros.
- Producer: Eric Valentine

Taking Back Sunday chronology
| Where You Want to Be (2004) | Louder Now (2006) | New Again (2009) |

Singles from Louder Now
- 1. "MakeDamnSure" Released: March 14, 2006; 2. "Twenty-Twenty Surgery" Released: August 28, 2006; 3. "Liar (It Takes One to Know One)" Released: November 6, 2006; 4. "What's It Feel Like to Be a Ghost?" Released: December 31, 2006; 5. "My Blue Heaven" Released: April 2, 2007

Louder Now is the third studio album by American rock band Taking Back Sunday. In April 2005, the group had begun writing material for the album. Two months later, they signed with Warner Bros. Records and contributed a song to the Fantastic Four soundtrack. Soon afterwards, the group rented a room in Manhattan where they composed songs for Louder Now. They came up with 20 songs, discarding half of them and recording demos of the remainder. The group began recording Louder Now with Eric Valentine in September 2005 at Barefoot Studios in Los Angeles, California. After Warner Bros. told them they did not need to rush, they recorded new demos. Recording ended on New Year's Day, 2006, and was followed by a tour of the UK, Australia and the U.S.

Louder Now was released on April 25, 2006, on Warner Bros. Records. Several weeks later, "MakeDamnSure" was released as a single; this was followed by a tour with Angels & Airwaves. A music video was released for "Twenty-Twenty Surgery", and the single was released a month later. A video for "Liar (It Takes One to Know One)" was released in September, before the single's release in November. Taking Back Sunday then began a two-month stint as part of the Taste of Chaos tour. A video album, The Louder Now DVD: PartOne, was released in December. The album included videos of the recording process, tour footage and music videos. "What's It Feel Like to Be a Ghost?" was released as a single on New Year's Eve. In early 2007 the group toured North America, followed by the release of "My Blue Heaven" as a single in April. After a tour with Linkin Park, guitarist Fred Mascherino left the group and was replaced by Matthew Fazzi.

Louder Now received generally favorable reviews from critics, and was voted Kerrang!'s album of the year. It debuted at number two on the Billboard 200, selling 158,000 copies in its first week after release, reached the top 10 of several Billboard charts and the top 20 in Canada, Australia and the UK. Two months after its release, Louder Now was certified gold by the RIAA for sales of 500,000 copies and was later certified silver by the BPI for sales of 60,000 copies. As of May 2009, the album has sold 674,000 copies in the U.S.

== Background and writing ==
In July 2004, Taking Back Sunday released Where You Want to Be on independent label Victory Records. The album became a bestselling independent rock album within a year, selling 634,000 copies, and was certified gold by the RIAA. The band toured frequently for eight months before beginning to compose material for their next album. Vocalist Adam Lazzara said in April 2005 that the band was in "the early stages" of writing new songs. In April and May the group went on a co-headlining tour with Jimmy Eat World, introducing "Error: Operator" and "What's It Feel Like to Be a Ghost?".

On June 10, it was announced that the band had signed with major label Warner Bros. Records and would begin recording their third album later in 2005. That month, the group contributed "Error: Operator" (which differs from the final album version) to the video-game adaption of Fantastic Four. Activision, the game's developers, wanted the track written from the viewpoint of Mister Fantastic. The group was hesitant, according to Lazzara, since the character is an "extremely rich, extremely smart guy ... And I'm not very smart, and I'm not rich at all, so I couldn't really relate." The song was also included on the film's soundtrack. In June and August 2005, the band supported Green Day for two UK shows, and supported Weezer for a US stadium show; they were initially scheduled to headline Hellfest, though they later dropped off.

In July 2005, Taking Back Sunday rented a room in Manhattan, which they shared with members of the Sleeping, and began writing songs with laptops and guitars for their next album. Typically, they arrived at about 10 am; some evenings, Lazzara showed up after the band to write melodies. The group wrote 20 songs before discarding half, and recorded 14 or 15 demos in their home studio. According to bassist Matt Rubano, Fred Mascherino and Adam Lazzara's lyrics "are coming into a golden age. The tracks are really more rocking and we're trying some new things, but it's still us." For Where You Want to Be the group "didn't spend as much time playing together," but for Louder Now "we know each other's playing. We know what we want and don't want."

== Recording ==
On September 21, 2005, it was announced that Taking Back Sunday had begun recording their third album with Eric Valentine. The group chose Valentine because he had produced Queens of the Stone Age's Songs for the Deaf (2002) and Third Eye Blind's self-titled album (1997). Although they met with Howard Benson and Rob Cavallo, the band's "love of Eric's work kind of trumped any other meeting we had." Unlike their previous records, the group worked in a large studio (Barefoot Studios in Los Angeles, California). Warner Bros. told them, "Take your time and it's done when you're done with it," and the band did another set of demos with input from Valentine. According to Mascherino, the group knew how they wanted the upcoming album to sound, so demoing again was a "thorough way to do it." Working in a big studio, according to Lazzara, gave the band the opportunity to "have more than two guitar sounds."

According to Rubano, the group wished to make a rock-oriented album—not in compositional style, but "maybe in the recording and the tones of the instruments." They brought out "a really unique character" in all the songs. During the recording, guitarist Ed Reyes used Orange and Burman amplifiers. Most of his guitar tracks were recorded with an Epiphone Casino guitar, and he also used an Epiphone Crestwood guitar. Frequently using a tape delay effect, Reyes did not use distortion pedals since the Orange amp "had a perfect gain sound in itself." Mascherino used his Gibson SG Special guitar during recording, which he said had "an amazing sound which is really warm and gives me my own sound." He channeled it through a Marshall JCM800 amplifier, and also used a Gibson Firebird guitar when the group needed "a really tight sound." The drums were recorded in three days. After positioning four microphones around (and inside) the bass drum, Valentine placed Mark O'Connell in a room "he calls the torture chamber." According to the drummer, the room's acoustics made the drums sound "insane."

By November the rhythm guitar, bass and drums were done, leaving the vocals and lead guitar to be finished. Recording wrapped up on New Year's Day, 2006. The songs were recorded with Pro Tools and transferred to analog tape for mixing, which was done by Valentine. Matt Radosevich engineered the recordings, assisted by Chris Roach. The band recorded 14 songs, with 11 planned to make the final track listing. The strings on "My Blue Heaven", arranged by Anton Patzner, were performed by Judgement Day. Patzner played violin and viola, and his brother Lewis played cello. Elena Mascherino contributed backing vocals to "I'll Let You Live", and Brian Gardner mastered the recordings at Bernie Grundman Mastering in Hollywood, California. The group released behind-the-scenes studio clips, often with snippets of new songs.

== Music and lyrics ==
Lazzara said that Taking Back Sunday was "starting to grow up," no longer writing songs about being in high school and realizing that they "have to be an adult about some things." According to Mascherino, the group wanted to create something "timeless" to stand out from their peers; they "didn't want to just do the formula," and used piano, xylophone and strings. Alternative Press noted that Louder Now had a "much more full sound, much more tight" than Where You Want to Be. MTV called the album "a big, ballsy, monster of a rock record," and its title affirms that it is a rock record. The album's sound has been described as alternative rock, emo pop, pop-punk and emo.

"What's It Feel Like to Be a Ghost?" is, according to Lazzara, about a "pre-pre-midlife crisis." Mascherino said that the song "charges forward," never letting "up and fully rocks the entire time." Rubano called the opening guitar riff "not quite 'Paradise City', but it's a guitar riff where when we first came up with it, we were like, 'Whoa! Rock!'" He thought that "Liar (It Takes One to Know One)" sounded like a modern equivalent of the Police. Lazzara called the song "110 miles-per-hour, very hard to play and totally rocking," and Mascherino considered it and "Spin" the group's fastest songs ever. "MakeDamnSure" has a phone message in the bridge; Lazzara and his girlfriend were arguing at the time, and she left him a message. Lazzara showed it to Valentine, wanting to include it in the song. According to Mascherino, "MakeDamnSure" received the greatest group effort of the album's songs. "Up Against (Blackout)", a track with a time signature of 6/8, was compared to Mascherino's former band Breaking Pangaea. The intro to "My Blue Heaven" was reminiscent of "Wounded" by Third Eye Blind; the lyrics during the chorus were taken from "Wedding Dress" by Breaking Pangaea.

For "Twenty-Twenty Surgery" Lazzara had several lyrics and melodies, "but nothing was working and it was the most frustrating thing"; its chorus was the album's final composition. Mascherino called "Spin" "this album's 'The Union', but on steroids", (Note: "The Union" was the fifth track from Where You Want to Be.) drawing a comparison to Circa Survive. The acoustic ballad "Divine Intervention" recalled the quieter work of Brand New, and included a lyrical reference to "My Favorite Things" from The Sound of Music. Mascherino soloed on "Miami", encouraged by Lazzara when the band was recording its demo. Lazzara later called the solo "funny and great." According to Mascherino, the group wanted the song "to sound as much like the Cure as possible, so it's all clean guitars." He said that the drums on "I'll Let You Live" were recorded at a faster tempo, sounding "totally deeper" when played back; the song evoked Breaking Pangaea's 11 minute song "Turning". "Sleep" was the band's attempt at a Motown-inspired bass sound. "Brooklyn (If You See Something, Say Something)" contains a "real floaty, airy pre-chorus and then it's upbeat but dark," according to Lazzara. He did not regret dropping "Sleep" and "Brooklyn" from the final track listing "because when you listen to everything down, they just didn't really feel like they fit."

== Release ==
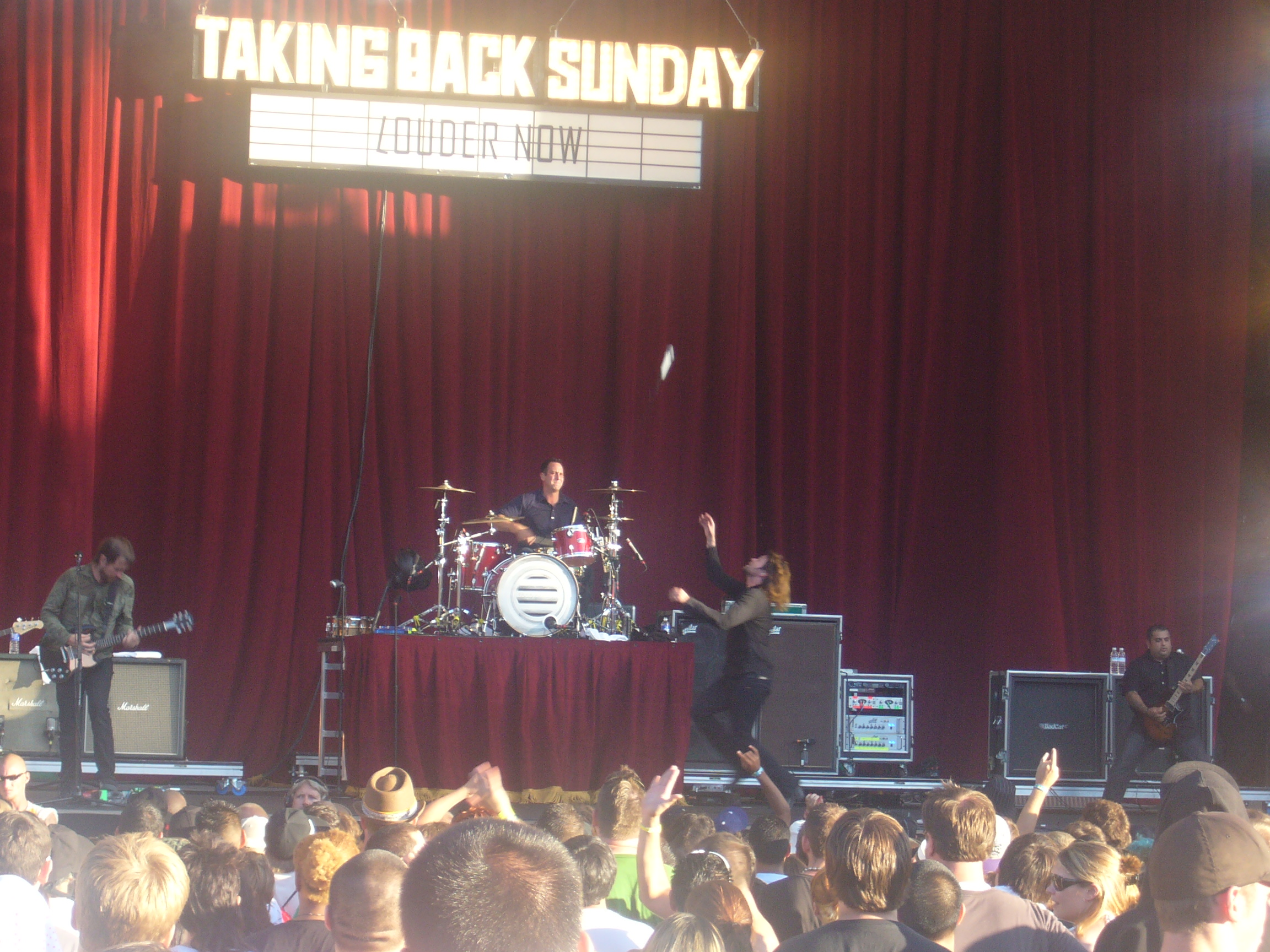
Taking Back Sunday on the Projekt Revolution tour, August 19, 2007

In late January 2006, Taking Back Sunday toured the UK. On February 16, the upcoming release of Louder Now was announced. The album's artwork, a photograph by Joel Meyerowitz edited by Brad Filip, was introduced the following day. It consists of a movie theater box office with the admission price listed as $1.52. A shot of people and a marquee sign can be seen in the reflection of the box office glass, which Lazzara said was a nod to "What's It Feel Like to Be a Ghost". He added that they ""wanted to touch on the feeling that you can be in a room packed full of people and still feel alone". On February 21, "MakeDamnSure" became available for streaming; in early March, the band filmed its music video. The video was filmed in Los Angeles with director Marc Klasfeld; according to Rubano, the band chose Klasfeld because his script for the video suited the song. MTV called it "a powerful montage of violent images, all shot in arty slow motion," combined with footage of the band performing in a wind tunnel. "MakeDamnSure" was released to radio on March 14. The group then toured Australia, returning for a U.S. tour from late March to mid-May with support from Tokyo Rose, and Suicide City. On April 6, the "MakeDamnSure" video was released. The group played at the Give it a Name festival in the UK before headlining the Bamboozle festival in the U.S. Louder Now was made available for streaming on April 18, 2006, before being released on April 25, 2006 through Warner Bros. Records.

"MakeDamnSure" was released as a single on May 15, with "Sleep" its B-side. In June and July, the band toured with Angels & Airwaves. On July 23, the music video for "Twenty-Twenty Surgery" was released, directed by Jay Martin, and on August 28, it was released as a single with "Brooklyn (If You See Something, Say Something)" its B-side. "Liar (It Takes One to Know One)" was released to radio on September 19. A music video for the song, directed by Tony Petrossian, was released on September 29. In October and November 2006, the group was part of the Taste of Chaos tour, visiting New Zealand and Europe. "Liar (It Takes One to Know One)" was released as a single on November 6, with a live version of "Spin" its B-side. Ten days later, the band appeared on Last Call with Carson Daly. On December 12, the band released a DVD entitled The Louder Now DVD: PartOne, with over 60 minutes of footage documenting the making of the album, their world tour, live and behind-the-scenes footage of a show at the Long Beach Arena and the music videos for "MakeDamnSure" and "Liar (It Takes One to Know One)". On New Year's Eve, "What's It Feel Like to Be a Ghost?" was released as a single.

On February 6, 2007, the band appeared on Last Call with Carson Daly again. In late February and early March 2007, they headlined a North American trek with support from Underoath and Armor for Sleep. On April 2, "My Blue Heaven" was released as a single and released to radio a week later. From late July to early September, the band participated in the 2007 Projekt Revolution tour with Linkin Park. On August 3 it was announced that O'Connell had injured his back, and he was replaced by Matchbook Romance drummer Aaron Stern for the remainder of the tour. Shortly after the tour Mascherino left the band, although his departure was not announced until early October. He said, "It was getting to the point where I felt I had taken the road as long as I possibly could," and his compositions were "more pop than anyone else [in the band] wanted to go." Mascherino had written over 45 songs, most intended for Louder Now but turned down by the band. He began a solo project, the Color Fred, and remarked that Taking Back Sunday was "more about cooking food than making music".

== Critical reception ==
Professional ratings
Aggregate scores
| Source | Rating |
|---|---|
| Metacritic | 64/100 |
Review scores
| Source | Rating |
| AbsolutePunk | 75% |
| AllMusic | 3.5/5 stars |
| Alternative Press | 4/5 stars |
| The A.V. Club | C− |
| Entertainment Weekly | B+ |
| Gigwise | 4/10 stars |
| Now | 2/5 |
| Rolling Stone | 3/5 stars |
| Stylus Magazine | B− |

Louder Now received a score of 64 out of 100 from Metacritic, indicating "generally favorable reviews". AbsolutePunk founder Jason Tate considered the album "closer to Northstar's Pollyanna" than to Where You Want to Be, and said that the music wasn't "anything mind-blowing. I don't get knocked on my ass like I did the first time I heard TAYF, but the catchy repetitiveness is all there." AllMusic reviewer Corey Apar called the album's name "an apt title for a super-tight, aggressive album that falls somewhere between their last two, tapping the heartfelt vigor of Tell All Your Friends in order to give Where You Want to Be a swift, square kick in the pants." Scott Heisel wrote for Alternative Press that the band "[is] spot-on when they floor it or put it in park; it's the sputtering along in-between that hurts the record." Despite not mastering "the art of the middle ground," they take "immense leaps forward musically on their third album." According to Heisel, the band should be "commended, not for just choosing not to rehash their older work, but for truly trying to branch out artistically—and succeeding most of the time."

Kyle Ryan of the A.V. Club called Taking Back Sunday's sound on their debut album "fresh and raw" and their approach to Louder Now "formulaic". According to Ryan, Lazzara "changed his style a bit" and "occasionally sound[ed] like his jaw is wired shut." Entertainment Weekly reviewer Clark Collis wrote that the album's title "justifies its name thanks to a chunkier array of riffs and choruses" compared to Where You Want to Be. Sarah Dean wrote on FasterLouder that Louder Now differs from the band's records; it has "a darker mood, bigger choruses and perhaps even catchier melodies," with the "emo-pop punk flavour Taking Back Sunday are renowned for." Gigwise contributor Lee Glynn wrote that the album had "no standout tracks" other than "MakeDamnSure". Apart from the latter, "there is nothing on this album that reaffirms them as a band full of malice and bite." Spence D. of IGN gave the album a score of 6.7 out of 10: "It's a safe bet to say that TBS diehards will soak up the 11 tracks with a sponge-like vengeance. Newcomers may wonder what all the bells and whistles are about, though. But tracks like 'My Blue Heaven', 'Spin', 'Divine Intervention' and 'I'll Let You Live' promise even greater things to come from this band, who are only now hinting at their growing sonic maturity."

NME gave the album a score of six out of ten: "It tails off towards the end, and TBS never quite shake the feeling that other people are doing this sort of thing far more thrillingly elsewhere." Now reviewer Evan Davies wrote that although the group's fans and label had expectations, it "doesn't mean you have to put out the exact same fucking album twice in a row." According to Davies, Taking Back Sunday writes two kinds of songs: "energetic pop rock with whiny vocals, and midtempo power rock, again with whiny vocals." Christian Hoard of Rolling Stone wrote that the group "amped up their sound," with Valentine "delivering a turbocharged attack spiked with dark, catchy melodies and giant choruses." Hoard called most of the album's songs "skull-rattling slasher[s] with enough pop smarts to keep the heartbroken agony from becoming too much to handle." For Stylus Magazine, Ian Cohen wrote that the album "tables the discussion" of whether Taking Back Sunday "embrace their arena destiny or disappear into the basement for cred that never really existed." Cohen concluded, "As was the case with pop-metal, 'albums' weren't the objective, so much as a few ace singles and album tracks that hold serve, which is Louder Now in a nutshell."

== Commercial performance ==
Louder Now was expected to sell 185,000 copies. It sold 158,000 copies in its first week, and debuted at number two on the Billboard 200. The album had lower first-week sales than Where You Want to Be, which had sold 164,000 copies. Louder Now was surpassed at the top of the chart by Godsmack's IV, which sold 211,000 copies. The album was number two on the Digital Albums chart, number seven on the Top Rock Albums chart and number nine on the Tastemaker Albums chart. It was number five in Canada, number 17 in Australia, number 18 in the UK, number 70 in Ireland and number 90 in Japan.

Two months after its release, Louder Now was certified gold by the RIAA. By August 2006 the album had sold over 470,000 copies; in November it was certified silver by the BPI, and was number 124 on the Billboard 200 Albums year-end chart. "MakeDamnSure" was number eight on the Alternative Songs chart, number 25 on the Digital Songs chart and number 36 on the UK Singles Chart. "Twenty-Twenty Surgery" was number 60 on the UK Singles Chart. "Liar (It Takes One to Know One)" was number 21 on the Alternative Songs chart and number 83 on the UK Singles Chart. By May 2009, the album had sold 674,000 copies.

== Accolades and legacy ==
The album was one of Alternative Press' most-anticipated albums of the year, and topped Kerrang!'s album-of-the-year poll. The music video for "MakeDamnSure" was nominated for an MTV2 Viewer's Choice award, which ultimately lost to "The Kill" (2006) by Thirty Seconds to Mars. TJ Horansky of Alternative Press wrote that with Louder Now, the group "started firing on all cylinders." Mascherino's "unique fluid and gruff vocals perfectly complement" Lazzara's "maniacal and effusive delivery," and Horansky called the vocals "much more natural" than Taking Back Sunday's previous albums. Fuse.tv's Jason Lipshutz called Louder Now his second-favorite Taking Back Sunday album. According to Lipshutz, it "was a mainstream mission statement, with ferocious guitar work and choruses aimed squarely at arenas." With moments of "true grace and contemplation," the album was "thrilling and complex." Rock Sound ranked it at number 55 on the list of best albums in their lifetime, stating that "nothing else in their back-catalogue boasts the huge songs, slick polish and, arguably, the heart of their major label debut."

Louder Now has appeared on best-of emo album lists by The Daily Dot and Loudwire. Cleveland.com ranked "MakeDamnSure" at number 67 on their list of the top 100 pop-punk songs. Alternative Press ranked "MakeDamnSure" at number 54 on their list of the best 100 singles from the 2000s. The album was re-pressed on vinyl in June 2017, which charted at number 16 on the Vinyl Albums chart. Throughout 2019, the band performed Louder Now in its entirety for their 20th anniversary world tour. For cities in the US that had two shows back-to-back, the band would flip a coin to play either Louder Now or Where You Want to Be (2004) on the first night and the other album on the second night. To help promote the tour, a career-spanning compilation Twenty (2019) was released, which included "Liar (It Takes One to Know One)", "MakeDamnSure", "What's It Feel Like to Be a Ghost?" and "My Blue Heaven" from Louder Now.

== Track listing ==
All music and lyrics written and performed by Taking Back Sunday.

Side A

| No. | Title | Length |
|---|---|---|
| 1. | "What's It Feel Like to Be a Ghost?" | 3:47 |
| 2. | "Liar (It Takes One to Know One)" | 3:09 |
| 3. | "MakeDamnSure" | 3:32 |
| 4. | "Up Against (Blackout)" | 3:02 |
| 5. | "My Blue Heaven" | 4:09 |
| 6. | "Twenty-Twenty Surgery" | 3:55 |

Side B

| No. | Title | Length |
|---|---|---|
| 7. | "Spin" | 3:39 |
| 8. | "Divine Intervention" | 4:14 |
| 9. | "Miami" | 3:41 |
| 10. | "Error: Operator" | 2:51 |
| 11. | "I'll Let You Live" | 5:07 |

Japanese version (bonus tracks)
| No. | Title | Length |
|---|---|---|
| 12. | "Sleep" | 3:20 |

iTunes deluxe version (bonus tracks)
| No. | Title | Length |
|---|---|---|
| 12. | "Brooklyn (If You See Something, Say Something)" | 4:33 |
| 13. | "Sleep" | 3:20 |
| 14. | "Liar (It Takes One to Know One)" (live from Long Beach Arena) | 3:46 |
| 15. | "MakeDamnSure" (live from Long Beach Arena) | 3:33 |
| 16. | "Error: Operator" (live from Long Beach Arena) | 3:05 |
| 17. | "Divine Intervention" (live acoustic version on Live 105) | 3:44 |

Louder Now: PartOne (bonus tracks)
| No. | Title | Length |
|---|---|---|
| 12. | "Liar (It Takes One to Know One)" (live from Long Beach Arena) | 3:46 |
| 13. | "MakeDamnSure" (live from Long Beach Arena) | 3:33 |
| 14. | "Error: Operator" (live from Long Beach Arena) | 3:05 |
| 15. | "Divine Intervention" (live from Long Beach Arena) | 5:02 |

Louder Now: PartOne DVD (bonus DVD)
| No. | Title | Length |
|---|---|---|
| 1. | "Louder Now: PartOne" | 93:46 |
| 2. | "Performance Only" | 18:22 |

20th anniversary edition cd and bonus "7 inch bonus tracks
| No. | Title | Length |
|---|---|---|
| 12. | "Brooklyn (If You See Something, Say Something)" | 4:31 |
| 13. | "Sleep" | 3:20 |

=== The Louder Now DVD: PartTwo ===
A companion to The Louder Now DVD: PartOne, dubbed The Louder Now DVD: PartTwo was released on November 20 as a CD/DVD set. The DVD contained tour and studio footage, as well as music videos for "Twenty-Twenty Surgery" and "12 Days of Christmas". The CD featured live tracks, as well as the B-sides "Sleep" and "Brooklyn (If You See Something, Say Something)."

Disc 1: CD
| No. | Title | Length |
|---|---|---|
| 1. | "What's It Feel Like to Be a Ghost?" (live from Long Beach Arena) | 3:50 |
| 2. | "Twenty-Twenty Surgery" (live from Long Beach Arena) | 3:03 |
| 3. | "My Blue Heaven" (Live from Long Beach Arena) | 4:17 |
| 4. | "Spin" (live from Long Beach Arena) | 3:56 |
| 5. | "Liar (It Takes One to Know One)" (live from Long Beach Arena) | 3:46 |
| 6. | "MakeDamnSure" (live from Long Beach Arena) | 3:33 |
| 7. | "Error: Operator" (live from Long Beach Arena) | 3:05 |
| 8. | "Divine Intervention" (live from Long Beach Arena) | 5:02 |
| 9. | "Sleep" (non-album track) | 4:20 |
| 10. | "Brooklyn (If You See Something, Say Something)" (non-album track) | 4:33 |
| 11. | "12 Days of Christmas: Christmas Is for the Birds" (live from Sessions@AOL; hidden track) | 8:03 |

Disc 2: DVD
| No. | Title | Length |
|---|---|---|
| 1. | "What's It Feel Like to Be a Ghost?" (live from Long Beach Arena) |
| 2. | "Twenty-Twenty Surgery" (live from Long Beach Arena) |
| 3. | "My Blue Heaven" (live from Long Beach Arena) |
| 4. | "Spin" (live from Long Beach Arena) |
| 5. | "Twenty-Twenty Surgery" (music video) |
| 6. | "Liar (It Takes One to Know One)" (music video/making of video) |
| 7. | "12 Days of Christmas: Christmas Is for the Birds" (animation) |
| 8. | "Bonus Material" |

== Personnel ==
Personnel per booklet.

Taking Back Sunday

- Adam Lazzara – lead vocals
- Fred Mascherino – lead guitar, vocals
- Mark O'Connell – drums, percussion
- Eddie Reyes – rhythm guitar
- Matt Rubano – bass guitar, twelve-string bass (on track 1)

Additional musicians

- Anton Patzner – string arranger, viola, violin
- Lewis Patzner – cello
- Elena Mascherino – backing vocals on "I'll Let You Live"

Production

- Eric Valentine – producer, recording, mixing
- Matt Radosevich – engineer, editing
- Chris Roach – assistant engineer
- Brian Gardner – mastering
- Brad Filip – design, booklet photography, back cover photography
- Joel Meyerowitz – cover photo

== Charts ==
=== Weekly charts ===
Weekly chart performance for Louder Now
| Chart (2006) | Peak position |
|---|---|
| Australian Albums (ARIA) | 17 |
| Canadian Albums (Billboard) | 5 |
| Irish Albums (IRMA) | 70 |
| Japanese Albums (Oricon) | 90 |
| New Zealand Heatseekers Albums (RIANZ) | 1 |
| Scottish Albums (Official Charts) | 15 |
| UK Albums (Official Charts) | 18 |
| UK Rock & Metal Albums (Official Charts) | 1 |
| US Billboard 200 | 2 |
| US Indie Store Album Sales (Billboard) | 3 |
| US Top Rock Albums (Billboard) | 2 |

=== Year-end charts ===
Year-end chart performance for Louder Now
| Chart (2006) | Position |
|---|---|
| US Billboard 200 | 124 |
| US Top Rock Albums (Billboard) | 23 |

== Certifications ==
Certifications for Louder Now
| Region | Certification | Certified units/sales |
|---|---|---|
| United Kingdom (BPI) | Silver | 60,000^{^} |
| United States (RIAA) | Gold | 674,000 |
^{^} Shipments figures based on certification alone.
