= A Decade Under the Influence (song) =

2004 single by Taking Back Sunday

Single by Taking Back Sunday

from the album Where You Want to Be
- Released: June 21, 2004
- Studio: Mission Sound (Brooklyn, New York City); Water Music (Hoboken, New Jersey)
- Genre: Emo
- Length: 4:10
- Label: Victory
- Songwriters: Adam Lazzara; Fred Mascherino; Eddie Reyes; Matt Rubano; Mark O'Connell
- Producer: Lou Giordano

Taking Back Sunday singles chronology
| "You're So Last Summer" (2003) | "A Decade Under the Influence" (2004) | "This Photograph Is Proof (I Know You Know)" (2005) |

"A Decade Under the Influence" is a song by American rock band Taking Back Sunday. The song was released as the lead single from the band's second studio album Where You Want to Be. "A Decade Under the Influence" would become the band's breakout single, peaking at No. 16 on the Billboard Modern Rock Tracks chart and No. 70 on the UK Singles Chart.

== Composition ==
The song started out as riff written by rhythm guitarist Eddie Reyes. Vocalist Adam Lazzara wrote the lyrics after he had broken up with a long-time girlfriend; his ex-girlfriend had purchased tickets for the pair to attend a Coldplay concert and, despite the two having broken up, still went to the show together. Lazzara called the car ride a very awkward experience. The song itself is about someone who realizes he understands less about the world than he had originally thought.

== Track listings ==
CD single

| No. | Title | Length |
|---|---|---|
| 1. | "A Decade Under the Influence" (album version) | 4:10 |
| 2. | "Little Devotional" (Mike Sapone demo) | 2:55 |
| 3. | "A Decade Under the Influence" (Mike Sapone demo) | 4:08 |

7-inch single

Side A
| No. | Title | Length |
|---|---|---|
| 1. | "A Decade Under the Influence" | 4:10 |

Side B
| No. | Title | Length |
|---|---|---|
| 1. | "Your Own Disaster" | 4:51 |

== Charts ==
=== Weekly charts ===
Weekly chart performance for "A Decade Under the Influence"
| Chart (2004) | Peak position |
|---|---|
| Scottish Singles Sales (Official Charts) | 79 |
| UK Singles (Official Charts) | 70 |
| UK Rock & Metal (Official Charts) | 9 |
| US Alternative Airplay (Billboard) | 16 |

=== Year-end charts ===
Year-end chart performance for "A Decade Under the Influence"
| Chart (2004) | Position |
|---|---|
| US Modern Rock Tracks (Billboard) | 65 |
