= Where You Want to Be =

2004 studio album by Taking Back Sunday

Studio album by Taking Back Sunday
- Released: July 27, 2004
- Recorded: March–April 2004
- Studios: Mission Sound, Brooklyn, New York; Water Music, Hoboken, New Jersey
- Genres: Pop-punk; emo; post-hardcore
- Length: 43:22
- Label: Victory
- Producer: Lou Giordano

Taking Back Sunday chronology
Tell All Your Friends (2002)	Where You Want to Be (2004)	Louder Now (2006)

Singles from Where You Want to Be
- 1. "A Decade Under the Influence" Released: June 22, 2004; 2. "This Photograph Is Proof (I Know You Know)" Released: January 11, 2005

Where You Want to Be is the second studio album by American rock band Taking Back Sunday, released July 27, 2004 by Victory Records. The title comes from a line in the opening track, "Set Phasers to Stun." Dismissive of several early songs, they wanted to "grow musically with this [new album]." In March 2004 recording of the album began, with Lou Giordano as producer. The band recorded at Mission Sound in Brooklyn, New York for two weeks before moving to Water Music in Hoboken, New Jersey, finishing recording by April. While touring to promote Tell All Your Friends (2002), guitarist John Nolan and bassist Shaun Cooper left the group and were replaced by Fred Mascherino and Matt Rubano, respectively.

The first single from Where You Want to Be was "A Decade Under the Influence," which was released to radio in late June 2004. After an appearance at the Reading Festival in England, the group toured Europe and began a U.S. fall tour. They worked with Blink-182 member Tom DeLonge to create a music video, "This Photograph Is Proof (I Know You Know)," which was filmed in 48 hours. The band went on a winter tour with Atreyu and Funeral for a Friend, and "This Photograph Is Proof (I Know You Know)" was released to radio in early January 2005. Taking Back Sunday then began a co-headlining tour with Jimmy Eat World.

Where You Want to Be has received mixed-to-positive reviews, selling 163,000 copies in its first week. The album debuted at number three on the Billboard 200 chart, remaining there for an additional 19 weeks. It topped the Independent Albums chart and remained on that chart for 50 weeks. "A Decade Under the Influence" reached number 16 on the Alternative Songs chart and the UK Top 75 chart. Where You Want to Be is Victory's highest-charting album; in July 2005 it was certified gold in the U.S. for sales of 500,000 copies, and sales have since exceeded 700,000.

== Background ==
Taking Back Sunday released its debut album, Tell All Your Friends, in March 2002 and spent most of the year and 2003 touring. Though the album only spent one week (at number 183) on the Billboard 200, it ended up spending 68 weeks the Heatseekers Albums chart (eventually peaking at number 9), and 78 weeks on the Independent Albums chart (peaking at number 8). Despite little airplay, the album had sold 110,000 copies by early 2003. In September 2002, the band went on tour; on this stint, vocalist Adam Lazzara fell off the stage and gashed his face in two places, in addition to dislocating his hip. Though the incident forced the group to drop off the tour, they spent the downtime working on new material. In early 2003, guitarist John Nolan said they were aiming to record in the near future, with plans to re-recorded two older songs, namely "The Ballad of Sal Villanueva" and "Your Own Disaster". In April 2003, Nolan and bassist Shaun Cooper left the band and later formed Straylight Run. Despite initially citing exhaustion from touring as the reason for his departure, Nolan later revealed his reasons for leaving included constant fighting within the group, as well as his deteriorating friendship with Lazzara.

A short period of uncertainty followed, with the group briefly considering breaking up. Two months had passed before deciding to continue without the pair. Breaking Pangaea vocalist/guitarist Fred Mascherino contacted guitarist Eddie Reyes and Reyes offered him a position. Reyes knew Mascherino from a few years prior when his old band Clockwise would play shows with Mascherino's old band Brody. Bassist Matt Rubano, who grew up with drummer Mark O'Connell, then joined the group. Rubano was initially hesitant as he was not a fan of emo music. They joined just in time for the band's fall 2003 tour. They began writing new material, and in a few months the group had enough songs for a second album. The band initially dismissed a number of songs, since the material wasn't "taking us anyplace new. We really wanted to grow musically with this [new album]." According to Mascherino, the group "didn’t spend as much time playing together in order to do exactly what we wanted to because some of us were new."

== Recording ==
After a September–November 2003 co-headlining tour with Saves the Day, according to Rubano, the group had "about 45 minutes to rest" before starting work on Where You Want to Be. They made demos for every song that would later feature on the album and altered them appropriately. Despite an MTV report that the band was recording in January 2004, recording for Where You Want to Be did not begin until March 1. Taking Back Sunday self-financed the recording sessions. Unable to obtain Eric Valentine as producer, the band worked with Lou Giordano. Two weeks of recording were done at Mission Sound in Brooklyn, New York, with Giordano assisted by Oliver Strauss and Barbra Vlahides. Stuart Karmatz was a technician, and Todd Parker the engineer. After recording drums, bass and most of the guitars, the band, Giordano and Parker moved to Water Music in Hoboken, New Jersey. The rest of the guitars and the vocals, strings and cowbells were recorded there, and recording was complete by April.

Giordano, Parker and Ted Young mixed the recordings, and Ted Jensen did the mastering; Mike Sapone contributed programming to the songs. For some of the songs, Giordano felt that the band "ought to try some things like strings and some different musical instruments" aside from the group's usual instrumentation. Conductor Ray Zu-Artez (who played piano) was brought in and wrote what Giordano said was "some pretty cool string parts". The strings were performed by the Girl Next Door String Quartet. Giordano said the strings turned the songs "into a real work of art". He added that, "It's showing them some ideas that they never would have thought of themselves that still fit the identity of the band". Neil Rubenstein of These Enzymes and Nick Torres of Northstar contributed vocals to some songs. In retrospect, Mascherino considered the sessions rushed.

== Composition ==
Musically, Where You Want to Be has been classed as pop-punk and emo. Additionally, some associate it with scene music. According to MTV, the album was "driven by punchy, melodic hardcore riffs and yearning vocals" similar to releases by the Movielife and Lifetime, with the band "expand[ing] its musical boundaries and tak[ing] some chances." Mascherino and Rubano (who both attended jazz college) were, according to Lazzara, "really schooled in music and they know their instruments really well." When they joined the band, they "cleaned up and tightened our sound." The album retains the call-and-response vocals that were featured on Tell All Your Friends. Despite Lazzara wanting to include Mascherino as much as possible, he felt there was no need for two people to be singing certain parts, deciding to maintain the dual vocals as it was a big appeal for the group. Mascherino wanted to retain the same level of energy and mood that is present on Tell All Your Friends. He added that they made "a better sounding" album due to having more time to record it. Like Tell All Your Friends, the album's song titles were gleaned primarily from TV.

"Bonus Mosh Pt. II" was the first song written by the new line-up; the track, along with "A Decade Under the Influence", started out as riffs by Reyes that he brought in and jammed out with the rest of the band. Its title came from a friend of the band; the group was playing demos for the friend, and during one section of a song the friend exclaimed: "Whoa, that's a bonus mosh part two, man, that's cool." The track had a Dashboard Confessional-like bridge section and Thursday-esque vocals. "A Decade Under the Influence" is about a person's realization that they understand less about the world than they had thought. Lazzara wrote the lyrics after breaking up with a long-term girlfriend. She had purchased tickets to a Coldplay show, and despite the break-up, the pair still went. Lazzara found the car journey highly awkward. Reyes said he had the track's riff for a number of years, and thought it was in the vein of "1979" (1996) by the Smashing Pumpkins. "The Union" recalled Tell All Your Friends closer "Head Club", and is followed by the string-guided ballad "New American Classic". With "I Am Fred Astaire", Lazzara wanted to highlight Mascherino more. The title of "One-Eighty by Summer" came from a bet Reyes lost, to weigh 180 pounds (82 kg) by summer. The band had rewritten "Number Five with a Bullet" around a dozen times before they were satisfied with it. Lazzara wrote "...Slowdance on the Inside" when he was in a bad mood during a snowy day at the beach. A friend had suggested to him that he could slow dance on the inside or outside. It was one of the last tracks written while Nolan and Cooper were still in the group. The members called a truce on it, since O'Connell had worked on some Straylight Run tracks, with Nolan and Cooper letting Taking Back Sunday keep "...Slowdance on the Inside".

== Release ==
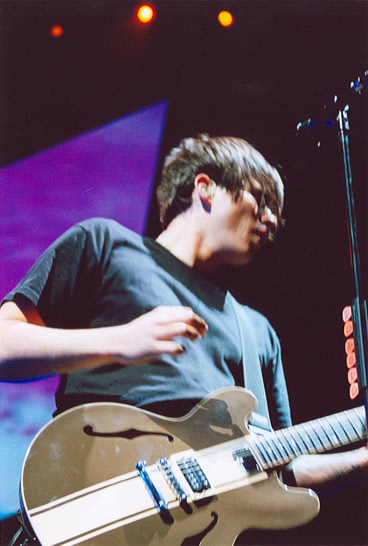
Blink-182 guitarist Tom DeLonge (pictured in 2004) directed the music video of "This Photograph Is Proof (I Know You Know)". He had previously co-directed the music video of "I Feel So" for his side project Box Car Racer with Nathan "Karma" Cox.

On April 9, 2004, Where You Want to Be was announced. A week later the band headlined the Skate and Surf Festival, and supported Blink-182 and Cypress Hill in May. Also in May, a music video directed by Adam Levite was filmed for "A Decade Under the Influence." In the video, the band is in circles in a warehouse. Remote-control monster trucks with cameras were placed on tracks on the circles; according to Lazzara, "it made everything look really sweet." "A Decade Under the Influence" was released as a radio single on June 22. A CD single of the song was released, with Mike Sapone-produced demos of "Little Devotional" and "A Decade Under the Influence" and "A Decade Under the Influence"'s music video. The group toured the UK with the Hurt Process and Recover, including a date at Download Festival. From June to August, they were part of the 2004 Warped Tour. Where You Want to Be was made available for streaming via MTV on July 22, and it was released on July 27 on Victory Records. The album's Japanese version includes a bonus track: a new version of "Your Own Disaster." The album's artwork was done by Brad Flip; Reyes proposed that Flip had the concept of "the band starting over again". A sign includes the words "Next Exit, 152 Miles", alluding to a gas station Lazzara and his friends would stop at Exit 152 off Interstate 40 in Mebane, North Carolina; Lazzara's father also lived near this area. Promotion for the album included street teams handing out sampler CDs and fliers.

After an appearance at the Reading Festival, Taking Back Sunday made a brief European tour. They toured the U.S. from September to November, supported by Fall Out Boy, Matchbook Romance and Funeral for a Friend. During the tour, the band filmed a video for "This Photograph Is Proof (I Know You Know)" with Blink-182's Tom DeLonge. Over a 48-hour period, they flew from Dallas to Los Angeles to Nashville, Tennessee to film the video. According to MTV, Taking Back Sunday posted on its website that DeLonge had "a great visual concept and was a very enthusiastic, focused and attentive first-time director." In November, the band began a tour with Atreyu and Funeral for a Friend. In early December, the band performed at Q101 Chicago's Xmas festival. "This Photograph Is Proof (I Know You Know)" was released as a radio single on January 11, 2005. In April and May, the band went on a co-headlining tour with Jimmy Eat World. In May, a music video for "Set Phasers to Stun" featured the Hungarian dance group Troup de Pozolo de Zav. Victory Records was uncertain whether to make the video an internet-only release or send it to MTV, and on May 11 it was posted on Yahoo! Launch. On June 16, a behind-the-scenes video on the making of the "Set Phasers to Stun" video was posted online.

== Critical reception ==
Professional ratings
Aggregate scores
Source	Rating
Metacritic	74/100
Review scores
Source	Rating
AllMusic	3.5/5 stars
Drowned in Sound	4/10
Entertainment Weekly	B+
Rolling Stone	3/5 stars
Sputnikmusic	2/5
Stylus Magazine	D+
USA Today	3/4 stars

According to AllMusic reviewer Heather Phares, Taking Back Sunday "sometimes comes off as less than distinctive, and the album can sound like a generic soundtrack to generic teenage angst." Phares called Where You Want to Be "definitely a solid album ... but crafting something a little more unique would take Taking Back Sunday's music that much farther." On Chart Attack, despite the album's being "overwrought" its "quality songwriting and some killer arrangements conceal Where You Want to Be's occasional off-the-chart cheese readings." Although Drowned in Sound writer Mat Hocking expected the album to be one of the "grittiest, most emotionally driving punk-pop records of the year," it turned out to be "an album that's playing it far too safe: melodies rise and fall, soaring and curving with painful predictability."

In a brief review for Entertainment Weekly, Sean Richardson wrote that Taking Back Sunday was "best suited for multipart campfire sing-alongs" and struck "rock-radio gold" with Where You Want to Be. Sam Sutherland of Exclaim! wrote that the group created "an exact musical duplicate" of Tell Your Friends. Although, "unadventurous as it is, the melodies remain catchy and the riffs remain driving." Rolling Stone reviewer Laura Sinagra noted Mascherino and Rubano as assisting "the will to power in Lazzara's Cure-like croon." Sinagra called "A Decade Under the Influence" the nearest that the singer gets to the "emotional tensions and ragged-rock edge" of Tell Your Friends. Spin writer Andy Greenwald wrote that nearly every song on the album "begins in the moment just before a fight or a tear-filled breakdown." Citing "New American Classic" and "This Photograph Is Proof (I Know You Know)," Greenwald noted Adam Lazzara's use of "anthemic choruses like 15-year-olds use emoticons: as sweeping shorthand placeholders for feelings too complicated to puzzle out and express."

Sputnikmusic reviewer John Hanson called the album "extremely repetitive, with many songs sounding exactly the same." Calling more than half the album "essentially the same song," Hanson wrote: "Despite all the shortcomings becoming far more apparent here, Where You Want To Be is still a tolerable, if very average and common, album." According to Stylus Magazine reviewer Todd Burns, Taking Back Sunday "smooth[ed] away all of the interesting bits and only focus[ed] on what works immediately and viscerally," providing "cheap thrills and obvious answers." Edna Gundersen of USA Today wrote that the group "cobbled together a host of emo clichés" to create a record that is "miraculously, more winsome than generic." Despite some "bittersweet confessional" songs which "resort to tired teen-angst whines," "an arresting tug-of-war between raw emotions and charged rhythms" pushes the band beyond "the everyday emo-rock ensemble."

== Commercial performance ==
Where You Want to Be debuted on the Billboard 200 chart at number three, selling 163,000 copies in its first week and remaining on the chart for 19 weeks. Victory Records' highest-charting release, it surpassed the previous record held by Atreyu's The Curse (which peaked at number 34). The album topped the Independent Albums chart, remaining on the chart for 50 weeks, and charted at number 70 in the UK. "A Decade Under the Influence" peaked at number 16 on the Alternative Songs chart and number 70 on the UK Singles Chart. After three weeks, 260,000 copies of the album had been sold. By the end of 2004, album sales stood at 458,000 copies. Where You Want to Be was ranked on the Billboard 200 Albums year-end chart at number 159, and by February 2005 sales had reached 566,000.

It became one of the best-selling independent rock albums within a year, selling 634,000 copies by June. As a result of this success, the group signed to Warner Bros. in the same month. The album was certified gold the following month by the RIAA. Taking Back Sunday was the first Victory Records band with a gold album; although the label did not intend to certify the album, it was certified by the group's label at the time, Warner Bros. According to Victory Records founder Tony Brummel, "From where I sit, this is another attempt by the RIAA and its major-label partners to victimize, abuse and belittle an independent record company." Band manager Jillian Newman responded, "I don't understand how a label gets victimized by receiving a sales award." By September, 667,000 copies had been sold; in early 2006 album sales stood at 700,000 copies.

== Legacy ==
In 2005, JJ Koczan of The Aquarian Weekly wrote that Where You Want to Be might "perhaps go down in pop culture history as the record that broke the emo scene commercially." Six tracks from the album were included on the 2007 Notes from the Past compilation. In 2014, Alternative Press' Brian Kraus wrote that it was "the closest they've come to the elusive 'perfect album.'" Calling it "catchy" in comparison to Tell All Your Friends, the album "matured the words past freshman year and flexed the rhythm guitar to a new level." In 2016, Fuse.tv ranked Where You Want to Be its number-one Taking Back Sunday album. According to Jason Lipshutz, the album "still smacks harder" than the band's other releases due to "a masterful sequencing, tighter hooks and most transcendent single ("A Decade Under The Influence")."

Throughout 2019, Taking Back Sunday performed Where You Want to Be in its entirety for their 20th anniversary world tour. For cities in the US that had two shows back-to-back, the band would flip a coin to play either Where You Want to Be or Louder Now (2006) on the first night and the other album on the second night. To help promote the tour, a career-spanning compilation Twenty (2019) was released, which included "A Decade Under the Influence", "Set Phasers to Stun" and "One-Eighty by Summer" from Where You Want to Be. "A Decade Under the Influence" appeared on a best-of emo songs list by Vulture. The album was an influence on As It Is as frontman Patty Walters explained: "Everything that our band knows - the riffs, the lyrics, the mic swings - we learned it all from Taking Back Sunday".

== Track listing ==
Track listing per booklet.

Side one

No.	Title	Length
1.	"Set Phasers to Stun"	3:03
2.	"Bonus Mosh Pt. II"	3:06
3.	"A Decade Under the Influence"	4:07
4.	"This Photograph Is Proof (I Know You Know)"	4:11
5.	"The Union"	2:50
6.	"New American Classic"	4:35

Side two

No.	Title	Length
7.	"I Am Fred Astaire"	3:43
8.	"One-Eighty by Summer"	3:53
9.	"Number Five with a Bullet"	3:49
10.	"Little Devotional"	3:07
11.	"...Slowdance on the Inside"	4:26

Japanese bonus track
No.	Title	Length
12.	"Your Own Disaster" (re-recorded version; originally appears on The Tell All Your Friends Demo)	5:39

== Personnel ==
Personnel per booklet.

Taking Back Sunday

- Adam Lazzara – lead vocals
- Fred Mascherino – lead guitar, vocals
- Eddie Reyes – rhythm guitar
- Matt Rubano – bass guitar
- Mark O'Connell – drums, percussion

Additional musicians

- Mike Sapone – programming
- Roy Zu-Arets – string arrangement, conductor, piano
- Girl Next Door String Quartet – strings
- Neil Rubenstein – vocals
- Nick Torres – vocals

Production

- Lou Giordano – producer, mixing
- Oliver Strauss – assistance
- Barbra Vlahides – assistance
- Todd Parker – engineer, mixing
- Stuart Karmatz – technician
- Ted Young – mixing
- Ted Jensen – mastering
- Brad Filip – layout, artwork

== Chart positions ==
=== Album ===
Chart (2004)	Peak position
UK Albums Chart	71
US Billboard 200	3
US Billboard Independent Albums	1

=== Year-end charts ===
Chart (2004)	Peak position
US Billboard 200 Albums Year-end	159

== Certifications ==
Region	Certification	Certified units/sales
United States (RIAA)	Gold	700,000
