= Liar (It Takes One to Know One) =

Single by Taking Back Sunday

from the album Louder Now
- Released: November 6, 2006
- Recorded: September 2005 – January 2006
- Studio: Barefoot, Los Angeles, California
- Genre: Pop-punk; emo
- Length: 3:09
- Label: Warner Bros.
- Songwriters: Adam Lazzara; Fred Mascherino; Mark O'Connell; Eddie Reyes; Matt Rubano
- Producer: Eric Valentine

Taking Back Sunday singles chronology
"Twenty-Twenty Surgery" (2006)	"Liar (It Takes One to Know One)" (2006)	"What's It Feel Like to Be a Ghost?" (2006)

"Liar (It Takes One to Know One)" is a song by American rock band Taking Back Sunday. The song was released as the third single from the band's third studio album Louder Now.

== Release ==
"Liar (It Takes One to Know One)" was released to radio on September 19, 2006. The song was released as a single almost two months later on November 6.

== Reception ==
AllMusic reviewer Corey Apar praised the wordplay between Adam Lazzara and Fred Mascherino, selecting the song as an AllMusic reviewer's pick. Alternative Press reviewer Scott Heisel said that "Liar (It Takes One to Know One)" is "hands down, the best song on Louder Now." Gigwise was more negative, saying the song "sounds like a Hot Hot Heat b-side, and nothing like the Taking Back Sunday we have come to know and love."

== Music video ==
The song's music video was directed by Tony Petrossian. The music video was released on September 29, 2006. The video shows the arm of a person hooked up to a lie detector test, as sketches within the polygraph show the band performing the song. At the end of the video, the figure hooked up to the machine is revealed to be frontman Adam Lazzara, while behind a one-way mirror stands the other band members, who appear to be the ones that gave him the test.

== Track listing ==
American single
No.	Title	Length
1.	"Liar (It Takes One to Know One)"	3:09
2.	"Spin" (Live)	3:54

European single
No.	Title	Length
1.	"Liar (It Takes One to Know One)"	3:09
2.	"Twenty-Twenty Surgery" (Live)	3:38

== Charts ==
Chart (2006)	Peak position
Scottish Singles Sales (Official Charts)	65
UK Singles (Official Charts)	83
US Alternative Airplay (Billboard)	21
US Bubbling Under Hot 100 (Billboard)	12
