= Tidal Wave (Taking Back Sunday album) =

Studio album by Taking Back Sunday
- Released: September 16, 2016
- Recorded: March–June 2016
- Studios: Sioux Sioux Studio, Charlotte, North Carolina
- Genres: Heartland rock; alternative rock; pop rock; emo; hard rock
- Length: 47:50
- Label: Hopeless
- Producer: Mike Sapone

Taking Back Sunday chronology
Happiness Is (2014)	Tidal Wave (2016)	Twenty (2019)

Tidal Wave is the seventh studio album by American rock band Taking Back Sunday. During the touring cycle for Happiness Is (2014), the group worked on material for their next record. Following a holiday show in late 2015, guitarist John Nolan was expecting his second child and wished to be nearby. As a result, vocalist Adam Lazzara was informed by engineer Mike Pepe of a studio close by that he worked at, Sioux Sioux Studio in Charlotte, North Carolina. With the members living between Lazzara and Nolan's houses, they persuaded producer Mike Sapone to join them. In January 2016, the group were writing at the studio, and by March, they started recording. One change the group experienced was the ability to track every instrument, and subsequently listen to it back. This enabled the group to listen to the proceedings objectively, rather than talking solely about a single part.

In summer 2016, the band embarked on the Taste of Chaos tour. In late June, Tidal Wave was announced and a music video was also released for the title-track. In late August, a music video was released for "You Can't Look Back". In mid-September, a lyric video was released for "Death Wolf". Tidal Wave was released on September 16 through Hopeless Records. The album peaked at number 36 on the Billboard 200 and in the top 10 of several other Billboard charts. In addition, it also charted in Australia and Scotland. Following this, the group went in an intimate club tour, during which they played the album in its entirety. In February 2017, a music video was released for "Call Come Running", and the group went on a UK tour. An Australian tour in March, followed by appearances at the When We Were Young and Rock on the Range festivals in April and May, respectively. In summer, the band embarked on a co-headlining US tour with Every Time I Die.

This was the band's last studio album to feature guitarist and co-founder Eddie Reyes, who announced his departure in 2018.

== Background ==
Taking Back Sunday released their sixth album Happiness Is in early 2014 through Hopeless Records. The album, which was produced by Mike Sapone, reached the top 10 in the Billboard 200. In between tours for the record, the group would meet up for two/three weeks at a time and work on ideas for their next album. In an interview with The Aquarian Weekly in early December 2015, vocalist Adam Lazzara reckoned that there would be another writing session before the group goes to record their next album. He said he could not "believe how [some of the songs] are coming out". During a holiday show in late December, Taking Back Sunday performed a new song entitled "Tidal Wave". While in preparation to record their next album, guitarist John Nolan was expecting a second child and wanted to be nearby. According to Lazzara, the group "always said it would be nice if there was a studio here we could record at", but was unaware of any.

Engineer Mike Pepe, who had been a long-time fan of the group, subsequently told Lazzara about a local studio where he worked at, Sioux Sioux Studios in Charlotte, North Carolina. Lazzara said he and Nolan were completely unaware of its existence, "It was too perfect. You never know what you’re getting when you go into a place, but Sioux Sioux had everything". The remaining band members that resided in other states – guitarist Eddie Reyes in Ohio, and drummer Mark O'Connell and bassist Shaun Cooper in New York – lived between Lazzara and Nolan's houses in Charlotte. The group then persuaded Sapone, who was based in Long Island, New York, to join them. After meeting up with the group, Lazzara said Sapone "didn't want to leave. He fell in love with it here. He would always get up early and drive around town". In early January 2016, the group posted that they were writing new material at the studio. Pepe and Ray Jeffrey worked on pre-production.

== Production ==
In mid-March 2016, the band revealed they had begun recording. Nolan said Sapone had frequently talked about Achtung Baby (1991) by U2, how it was that group's seventh record "and it challenged people's idea of who they were". It subsequently became a reference point for the group, in addition to INXS, Robert Palmer and the Cure, which "isn't necessarily obvious when you listen to Tidal Wave but on some level did influence it". Lazzara said ideas for songs would occur to him often while driving to the studio. Lazzara said one of the biggest changes with the album was that "we would play and track everything, and immediately go and listen to it without our instruments". It allowed the group to "look at things more objectively rather than playing a part all together in a room then talking about it". He added that it gave them "a point of reference that we could go back and listen to and that seemed to be a bit more productive for us". Lazzara said it became this "streamlined process to where we could get past the core of the song and start to add new ideas and chord changes just so the song can work better as a whole".

Lazzara said Sapone would "push you even when you don't want to be pushed and wants to explore every possible option that your brain can come up with". The group said that during recording "we've been discovering and surprising ourselves in realizing how good of a band we've become". Nolan said that "some of the playing on this record is just the best we've ever done. There were times when Mark was playing and I was thinking, 'I don't know how he's physically doing that'". Nolan said a lot of consideration went into how the guitars sounded "whether it was the amps or the different pedal combinations that we were trying out". Nolan said that his "instinct" when it came to lead guitar parts was to be laid back "and do things that are simple and melodic". Lazzara, who preferred guitar solos that do "something crazy and getting the tension", pushed for Nolan to do "more guitar noodling". Cooper said Reyes "had the basic riffs and [Nolan] could really explore his instrument". In early June, Lazzara said they had finished recording and were "getting the final mixes now". The NoDa Tabernacle Good Times Choir provided additional vocals on "Homecoming". Claudius Mittendorfer mixed the recordings at Atomic Heart Studio in New York City, while Stephen Marcussen mastered them at Marcussen Mastering in Hollywood, California.

== Music and lyrics ==
Lazzara said the group had four or five working titles for the album's name, but "none of them were that good". He added that after the group "were able to take a step back, that's when it was like, "Wait, there's all these references to water..." and then just that phrase—those two words [Tidal Wave] take on this whole new meaning". Discussing the lyrics, Lazzara said he "lose[s] sleep over it" and said that the songs had four or different drafts of lyrics "and you just try everything until something clicks and is right". Overall, he said the album was "a bit of a departure but I don't think its coming out of left field". Nolan added that it was "the culmination of things we've tried over the past two records ... We've freed ourselves up to go in new directions". Lazzara said he realized "this whole idea that, as a singer, to express a certain emotion you don't have to just yell. There's a smarter way to do it", citing "You Can't Look Back" as "a real dynamic example of that". Allie Volpe of Nylon wrote that the album "deals with the trials of homesickness as an adult and the changes that come with maturity". The album's sound has been described as alternative rock, emo, hard rock, heartland rock and pop rock, taking influences from such artists as Bruce Springsteen, the Ramones, the Gaslight Anthem, the Replacements, John Mellencamp, Tom Petty, Bryan Adams and Don Henley.

Lazzara said "Death Wolf" was "one of the faster songs" that the group has ever written and was "also unlike anything we've done in terms of the approach". Lazzara said the song's intro was originally placed prior to one of the choruses and that it was "almost like you were running as fast as you can someone just ripped the carpet out from under you and all of a sudden you're just floating, or like you took flight". "Tidal Wave" was one of the first songs written for the album. Discussing the track, Nolan said he was listening to NPR, who was discussing an African dictator who "would probably be dying soon ... [and t]he interviewer asked the question, 'So what's going to happen when the old man goes?'". Nolan subsequently said this phrase to Lazzara and O'Connell who, according to Lazzara, "kind of lit up and his eyes got real big. He was like, 'Man, we should make a song out of that'". However, they did not mention it for another "a month or two ... [Then one day Nolan] was like, 'Hey, you know that part that I had? I made a song out of it'". He added that O'Connell "had another vision for it" in the vein of the Ramones and the Clash.

Nolan said "I Felt It Too" was one of the slower songs on the album and it "really grabs me in a certain way: it makes me feel something every time I listen to it". At the end of "Call Come Running", Nolan's son can be heard singing the chorus. Lazzara said Nolan would often drive with his son while listening to album demos. As a result, his son would become familiar with the tracks. One night when Nolan put his son to sleep he heard his son singing. He recorded it and subsequently showed the band, to which Lazzara said "alright, that's got to be at the end of the song!" Lazzara called "Homecoming" "really beautiful but it's also really simple" and said it evokes the spirit of Petty, one of his favorite songwriters. Lazzara said the original version of the track was "awesome", however, after stripping it down, it was "even better". He wanted the track to "feel like we're hanging out in my backyard". O'Connel came up with the song's beat, which was then looped.

== Release ==
In June and July 2016, the band performed on the 2016 edition of Taste of Chaos. Throughout the tour, the group played "Tidal Wave". On June 27, Tidal Wave was announced for release in September. The following day, the title-track was made available for streaming. Album pre-orders included the track as an instant grat download. Later that same day, the album's track listing and artwork were revealed. The artwork was photo of Lazzara's child, taken by his wife on the side of a road across the Florida Keys. The group became aware of all the water references in the songs' lyrics around the time the photo was taken. Cooper said O'Connell spotted the picture on Lazzara's Instagram account – "it's one of those happy accidents type of thing". Nolan said the group "liked the juxtaposition of it being this calm serene thing but then since the album is called Tidal Wave it gives you the feeling that something might go wrong in that scenario". He added that the photo was originally "more colorful and vibrant", until the group "dulled it out and made it look like it was on an old weathered album cover". Also on the same day, a music video was released for "Tidal Wave", which consisted of concert and behind-the-scenes footage from the Taste of Chaos tour and was directed by Greg Hunter.

A music video was released for "You Can't Look Back" on August 23. It was filmed outside of Los Angeles, California in an hour and a half with director DJay Brawner. Leanne Aciz Stanton of The Aquarian Weekly said the video "revolves around a good-looking couple that goes to the beach for a campfire party" where the band members hang out, then "All of a sudden, [Lazzara] start[s] spewing blood everywhere". Discussing the video's original concept, Nolan said the group liked the idea "'but something fucked up needs to happen at the end.' At one point we were talking about having actual guts coming out but we didn't want to be that overt". On September 12, the group released a lyric video for "Death Wolf". Tidal Wave was released on September 16 through Hopeless Records. In September and October, the band went on an intimate club tour in the US. They were supported by You Blew It!, Loose Talk and Mammoth Indigo. During the tour, the group performed Tidal Wave in its entirety. Lazzara said this allowed the band "to see in real time people catching onto the songs".

On February 7, 2017, a music video was released for "Call Come Running", directed by Brawner and filmed in Lazzara's neighborhood in Charlotte. Stanton said that it continued on from the "You Can't Look Back" video with Lazzara "desperately running around looking for help while everyone ignores you, until some man helps you and throws you into a bath. [Lazzara] then emerge[s] from a lake, clean, and stand before what one would assume to be [his] family". Lazzara viewed the video as social commentary on how its becoming "harder and harder to be focused on what matters most and then there's all these things pulling you in different directions". In February, the band went on a tour of the UK with Frank Iero as the main support act. Milestones, Muncie Girls and Black Foxxes also supported on select dates. In March, the band went on a tour of Australia with support from Acceptance. In April, the band performed at When We Were Young Festival, and at Rock on the Range in May. In July and August, the band went on a co-headlining US tour with Every Time I Die. They were supported for the first half by Modern Chemistry and for the second half by All Get Out. Following this, the band performed at Riot Fest in September.

== Reception ==
Professional ratings
Aggregate scores
Source	Rating
Metacritic	73/100
Review scores
Source	Rating
AllMusic	3.5/5 stars
Contactmusic.com	3/5 stars
Entertainment Weekly	B
Exclaim!	6/10
Newsday	A
Punknews.org	3.5/5 stars
Rolling Stone Australia	3/5 stars
Sputnikmusic	4/5 stars
Ultimate Guitar	6.3/10

Tidal Wave received generally favorable reviews, according to review aggregation website Metacritic. AllMusic reviewer James Christopher Monger called the album "their most mature and diverse -- yet seamless -- set of songs to date". Contactmusic.com's Alex Lai wrote that for most of the album, it "moves along pleasantly enough, broken up by equal measures of excellence and tedium". The Denver Post writer Ian Gassman said that the album "might be a rush of nostalgia for the band itself, but not for their fans ... Sometimes a band has to make something for themselves and not try to appease an audience who's stuck on who they used to be". Maria Sherman of Entertainment Weekly wrote that it was "eclectic and sensitive", and "If emo is something that pigeonholes, Taking Back Sunday is making noble attempts to abandon those impulses—with Tidal Wave, the band is both emo and something else entirely".

Exclaim! reviewer Adam Feibel said that the album had a "polished sound with a slight edge" to it that was "shaped by some newly tapped influences. The results are hit and miss". He also said that it was "about time Taking Back Sunday shook things up, so the high points make Tidal Wave an effort that should please dedicated fans and appease the sceptics somewhat". Newsday's Glenn Gamboa said the group managed to blend a "number of rock genres to their wills to create their most diverse album yet while still maintaining a cohesive sound". He complimented Sapone's production, saying it helped the band "prove they still have plenty to say and do". Punknews.org staff member RENALDO69 said a lot of the songs were in the vein of New Again (2009): "dramatic, scared yet looking forward in life". He said that Lazzara "surprised me with how great he sounds throughout, spitting that Johnny Cash attitude at every corner".

Rod Yates of Rolling Stone Australia wrote that the album "feels cut from the same cloth" as Happiness Is, "only it's not quite as well tailored". Sputnikmusic staff member SowingSeason wrote that at its "core, Tidal Wave feels like a reinvention of what this band represents" and "the most complete recording" of their career. He added that none of the group's other albums have "such a varied approach without sacrificing any quality or altering the record's comprehensive aura". Ultimate Guitar wrote that "in an album that throws plenty of new ideas at the wall, only a few stick". They said that the "glitzy production value" was "bound to leave some listeners unsatisfied". Upset reviewer Heather McDaid wrote that there was "a marked change" for the album: "the choice to take a leap into something new or stay on the same path, and they chose to evolve". She added that it was "definitely ... full of pleasant surprises".

GIGsoup contributor Simon Carline wrote that the group had "a back catalogue that most bands of their age and genre would kill for, 'Tidal Wave' simply adds a few more favourites to the ranks". Brenda Herrera of WPGU noted that album was a bit longer than their previous albums and, "At times the entire album does feel like becomes a bit too much for one piece of work". She added that it was "not as memorable to me as previous albums because of all the different vibes it tries to channel so some cohesion as a whole gets lost".

The album charted at number 36 on the Billboard 200. In addition, it charted on a number of other Billboard charts: number 2 on Alternative Albums, number 3 on Independent Albums, number 6 on both the Top Rock Albums and Vinyl Albums, number 10 on both the Digital Albums and Tastemaker Albums, and number 16 on Top Album Sales. The album also charted at number 54 in Australia and number 94 in Scotland. Rock Sound included the album at number 42 on their list of top 2016 releases. Newsday included "Tidal Wave" at number 1 on their list of top songs of 2016 songs by Long Island artists. In a retrospective piece for Fuse.tv, writer Jason Lipshutz ranked the album as his fourth favorite Taking Back Sunday album. He said the album was "perhaps the biggest pivot in Taking Back Sunday's career—away from the scene that made them famous and toward a more wide-ranging brand of rock".

== Track listing ==
All songs written by Taking Back Sunday.

Tidal Wave track listing
No.	Title	Length
1.	"Death Wolf"	4:12
2.	"Tidal Wave"	2:32
3.	"You Can't Look Back"	4:27
4.	"Fences"	3:37
5.	"All Excess"	3:35
6.	"I Felt It Too"	5:22
7.	"Call Come Running"	3:12
8.	"Holy Water"	4:19
9.	"In the Middle of It All"	3:12
10.	"We Don't Go in There"	4:01
11.	"Homecoming"	4:01
12.	"I'll Find a Way to Make It What You Want"	5:20
13.	Untitled (hidden track)	5:21
Total length:		53:18

Best Buy bonus tracks
No.	Title	Length
13.	"Tidal Wave" (acoustic)	2:59
14.	"Holy Water" (acoustic)	9:34
15.	Untitled (hidden track after "Holy Water" (acoustic), starts at 6:10)
Total length:		60:23

== Personnel ==
Personnel per sleeve.

Taking Back Sunday

- Shaun Cooper – bass guitar
- Adam Lazzara – lead vocals
- John Nolan – lead guitar, keyboards, vocals
- Mark O'Connell – drums, percussion
- Eddie Reyes – rhythm guitar

Additional musicians

- The NoDa Tabernacle Good Times Choir, which provided additional vocals on "Homecoming":
  - Keaton Lazzara
  - Ryan Hurley
  - Ryleigh Varvaro
  - John John Nolan
  - Camille Nolan
  - Misha Lazzara
  - Elyse Hurley
  - Kara Urquhart
  - Greg Urquhart
  - Nathan Lazzara

Production

- Mike Sapone – producer
- Mike Pepe – engineer, pre-production
- Ray Jeffrey – pre-production
- Claudius Mittendorfer – mixing
- Stephen Marcussen – mastering
- Brad Filip – artwork
- Brad Clifford – additional art
- Misha Lazzara – cover photo, photos

== Charts ==
Chart performance for Tidal Wave
Chart (2016)	Peak position
Australian Albums (ARIA)	54
Scottish Albums (Official Charts)	94
US Billboard 200	36
US Top Alternative Albums (Billboard)	2
US Independent Albums (Billboard)	3
US Indie Store Album Sales (Billboard)	10
US Top Rock Albums (Billboard)	6

== Release history ==
Release history and formats for Tidal Wave
Region	Date	Format(s)	Label
United States	September 16, 2016	CD; DL; LP	Hopeless
