= Lou Giordano =

American record producer

Lou Giordano (born c. 1957) is a record producer and recording engineer who co-founded Radiobeat Studios. He worked at Fort Apache Studios when it was located in Boston, and was a partner in the production company Prodco, which had close ties with Fort Apache.

Giordano received a degree in electrical engineering from MIT. He was a sound man for Hüsker Dü through 1988, and later produced Bob Mould's spin-off Sugar. Giordano also built effects pedals for Mission of Burma.

He has produced a wide variety of bands, including Sunny Day Real Estate, The Connells, and the Goo Goo Dolls.

Giordano is also well known for having produced Taking Back Sunday’s second album, Where You Want To Be.
