= Taking Back Sunday =

American rock band

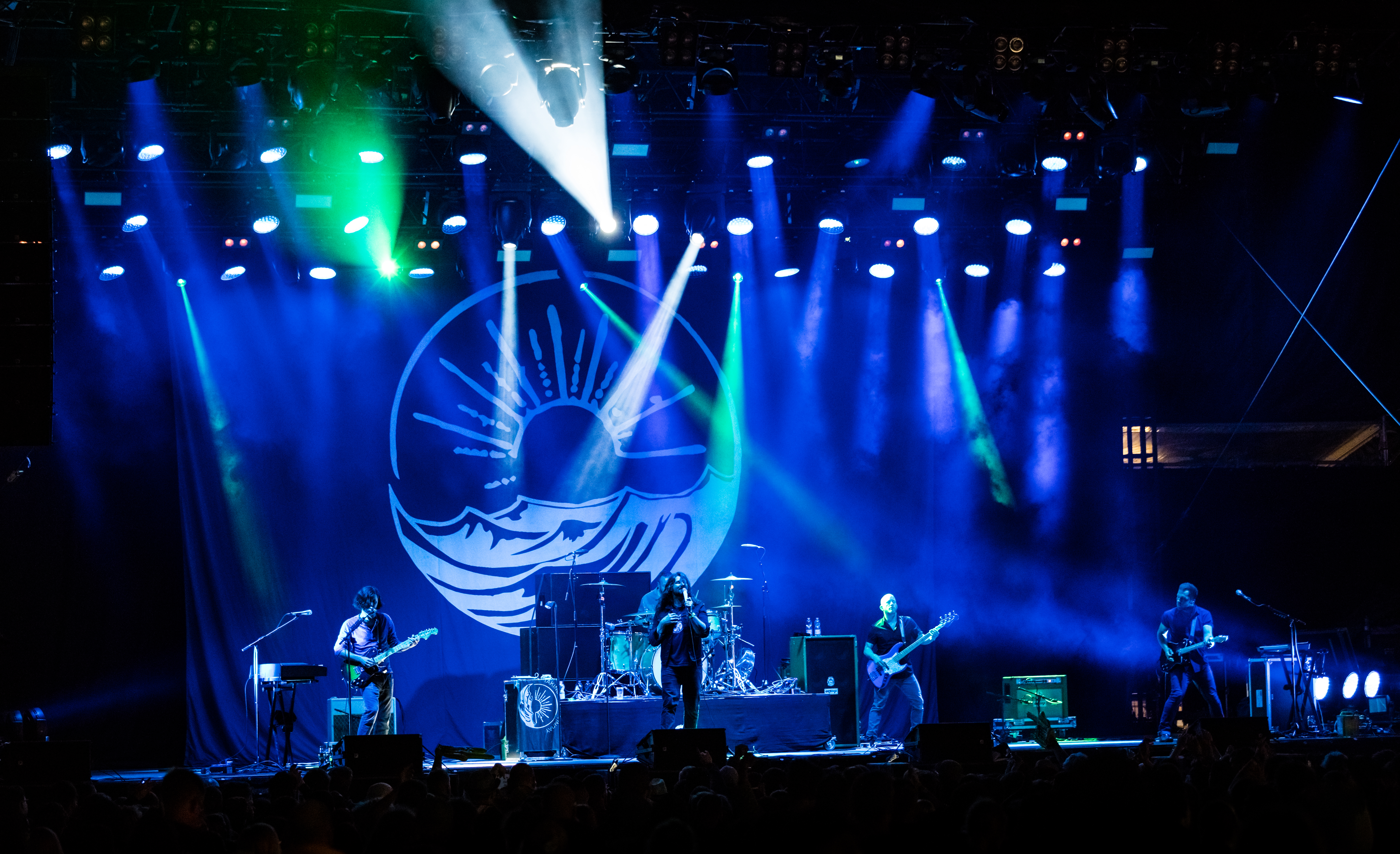
- Taking Back Sunday live at Rock am Ring 2018

Background information
- Origin: Amityville, New York, U.S.
- Genres: Emo; emo pop; post-hardcore; pop-punk; alternative rock; pop rock
- Years active: 1999–present
- Labels: Victory; Warner Bros.; Sire; Hopeless; Fantasy
- Spinoffs: Brand New; Straylight Run; The Color Fred
- Members: John Nolan; Adam Lazzara; Shaun Cooper
- Past members: Band members
- Website: takingbacksunday.com

Taking Back Sunday is an American rock band from Amityville, New York, formed by guitarist Eddie Reyes and bassist Jesse Lacey in late 1999 before rounding out the band with vocalist Antonio Longo, lead guitarist John Nolan, and drummer Steven DeJoseph. The band's current members are Adam Lazzara (lead vocals), John Nolan (lead guitar, keyboards, vocals) and Shaun Cooper (bass guitar), accompanied by Nathan Cogan (guitar), Mitchell Register (drums), and former member Fred Mascherino (guitar and vocals) for their live performances. The band's other former members include drummer Mark O'Connell, bassist Matthew Rubano, and guitarist-vocalist Matthew Fazzi.

Lacey quit Taking Back Sunday in 1999 and in 2000 formed the rock band Brand New, with whom Taking Back Sunday would become embroiled in a highly publicized feud. Lazzara joined prior to the release of the band's 2002 debut album Tell All Your Friends, while Nolan and Cooper left the band in 2003 to form Straylight Run before returning in 2010. The band's breakthrough album, 2006's Louder Now, featured the popular lead single "MakeDamnSure", sold over 900,000 copies, and peaked at No. 2 on the United States Billboard 200, surpassing the band's previous Billboard 200 peak in 2004 at No. 3 with Where You Want to Be. They released their eighth studio album, 152, in 2023.

Taking Back Sunday has been referred to as "one of the more visible groups of the early-2000s emo boom." The staff of Consequence ranked the band at number 38 on their list of "The 100 Best Pop Punk Bands" in 2019.

== History ==
=== Early years (1999–2002) ===
Guitarist Eddie Reyes, who had formed and played in the Movielife, Mind Over Matter and Inside, and guitarist Jesse Lacey of the Rookie Lot founded Taking Back Sunday in Amityville, New York, in November 1999. The band's name was taken from a song by Long Island band The Waiting Process. Lacey moved to bass with the addition of guitarist John Nolan. The group also included vocalist Antonio Longo of One True Thing, and drummer Steven DeJoseph. Lacey left the band after a personal incident with Nolan. (Note: This event later inspired Brand New to include "Seventy Times 7" on their debut album, Your Favorite Weapon (2001). Nolan wrote about the event from his point of view in Taking Back Sunday's "There's No 'I' in Team", and he and Lacey later reconciled.) Lacey formed Brand New a year later. Nolan contacted Adam Lazzara to fill in on bass, which resulted in Lazzara moving from North Carolina to New York. Lazzara had met the band when they played a show near his hometown in North Carolina. (Note: Lacey became hostile towards Lazzara and Taking Back Sunday. This situation, according to Alternative Press, "spawned one of the most public intra-band rivalries in emo history." Although Nolan and Lacey had mended their relationship, Lazzara described Lacey unfavorably in 2015.)

DeJoseph was unable to tour extensively because of personal issues and was waiting until the band had another drummer before leaving the group. Mark O'Connell, a friend of Reyes, heard about the opening and joined the group. After recording Taking Back Sunday's self-titled EP, Longo left the band and eventually played with The Prizefighter and the Mirror. In December 2000, Lazzara switched from bass to lead vocals. He never thought he would become the group's singer: "I remember getting into [Reyes'] Windstar with that [EP] and just driving around singing those songs, just to make myself actually do it." O'Connell suggested that the group needed a bassist, and brought in Shaun Cooper. Lazzara spoke of his initial thoughts on Cooper's talent in an interview with AP magazine, saying with Cooper it was "the best bass playing I'd ever seen in my life. I was like, "Oh my God, people can do that?'" In February 2001, Taking Back Sunday released a five-track demo before touring for a year.

While performing as an unsigned band, they received contract offers from labels that ultimately amounted to nothing. These included Triple Crown Records, who was apprehensive as they had just signed Brand New, and Drive-Thru Records' offer resulted from co-owner Richard Reines having mistaken Nolan for Lacey. Eventually, a friend of the band shared a demo with Victory Records sales and A&R representative Angel Juarbe. Jurabe then sent a copy to Victory founder Tony Brummel, who asked to see a live performance. Within two weeks of seeing them live, a contract was written up, and the band signed to Victory in December 2001.

=== Victory Records era: Tell All Your Friends and Where You Want to Be (2002–2005) ===
Although other labels expressed interest in Taking Back Sunday, Victory Records encouraged them to make an album. The band's debut effort was recorded over a period of two weeks in December 2001 at Big Blue Meenie Recording Studio in New Jersey with producer Sal Villanueva. Lazzara fell ill around Christmas, and the sessions were delayed one to two weeks; recording concluded in early January 2002, and ended up costing $10,000. The debut album's name was revealed in February to be Tell All Your Friends; prior to the release of their debut, a music video for "Great Romances of the 20th Century" was released on March 4, 2002. It was directed by Christian Winters, a friend of the band. Winters made the video before the group signed with Victory, and the record company enjoyed it. The song was distributed to radio stations on March 12, and the full album was released on March 25. A video for "Cute Without the 'E' (Cut from the Team)" followed on December 10, 2002, and "You're so Last Summer" on November 24, 2003, following a radio release the previous September. Both videos were also directed by Winters.

Lazzara was suffering from a drinking problem around this time and cheated on Nolan's sister, Michelle, who he had been dating for a while. After playing Skate & Surf Festival in late April 2003, Lazzara apologized to Nolan later that evening. However, Nolan later learned the apology had been insincere, and both Nolan and Cooper officially told the other three band members they were leaving the band two days later. Nolan publicly reasoned that his departure resulted from exhaustion from touring; Lazzara reiterated this reason, and revealed Cooper had left because he did not want to be in the band without Nolan. In truth, Nolan later revealed there was constant fighting within the group, with each member feeling they were not receiving enough credit for the group's success.

John and Michelle Nolan formed Straylight Run with Cooper and Breaking Pangaea drummer Will Noon in the wake of the split from Taking Back Sunday. Taking Back Sunday underwent a short period where they were unsure what to do next, and even briefly considered breaking up. The band was due to tour the United Kingdom with Brand New in May and June 2003; however, all the shows were cancelled because of rumors of the band breaking up. Eventually, it was decided the band would continue; the two departed Taking Back Sunday members were replaced by Breaking Pangaea frontman Fred Mascherino on guitar and vocals as well as O'Connell's longtime friend Matt Rubano on bass.

After their co-headlining tour with Saves the Day concluded in November 2003, Taking Back Sunday immediately commenced work on a second album. Recording for the second album began on March 1, with Lou Giordano at the helm as producer. Taking Back Sunday self-financed the recording sessions, two weeks of which took place at Mission Sound in Brooklyn, New York. The remainder of the album was completed at Water Music in Hoboken, New Jersey, and recording was officially finished by April. At the suggestion of Giordano, the band experimented with instruments aside from the group's usual instrumentation.

The record, titled Where You Want To Be, was released on July 27, 2004, on Victory Records. Despite sounding slightly different from Tell All Your Friends as a result of Giordano's guidance, the new album managed to do well commercially; preceded by the single "A Decade Under the Influence" on June 22, Where You Want To Be was propelled to the No. 3 spot on the Billboard 200 albums chart at its debut, with around 163,000 copies sold. It became one of the best-selling independent rock albums within a year, selling 634,000 copies by June 2005. Rolling Stone listed Where You Want To Be as one of the top fifty records of 2004. Instead of spending marketing money towards trying to get radio play, Victory Records deployed a street team handing out sampler CDs and fliers to promote the album. It remains Victory's highest chart peak for an album.

Tom DeLonge of Blink-182 directed the music video for "This Photograph is Proof (I Know You Know)"; Blink-182 had invited the band to open for them during their North American tour in 2004. Taking Back Sunday toured frequently for eight months in support of Where You Want to Be, including an appearance at the Reading Festival.

=== Major label debut: Louder Now (2005–2007) ===
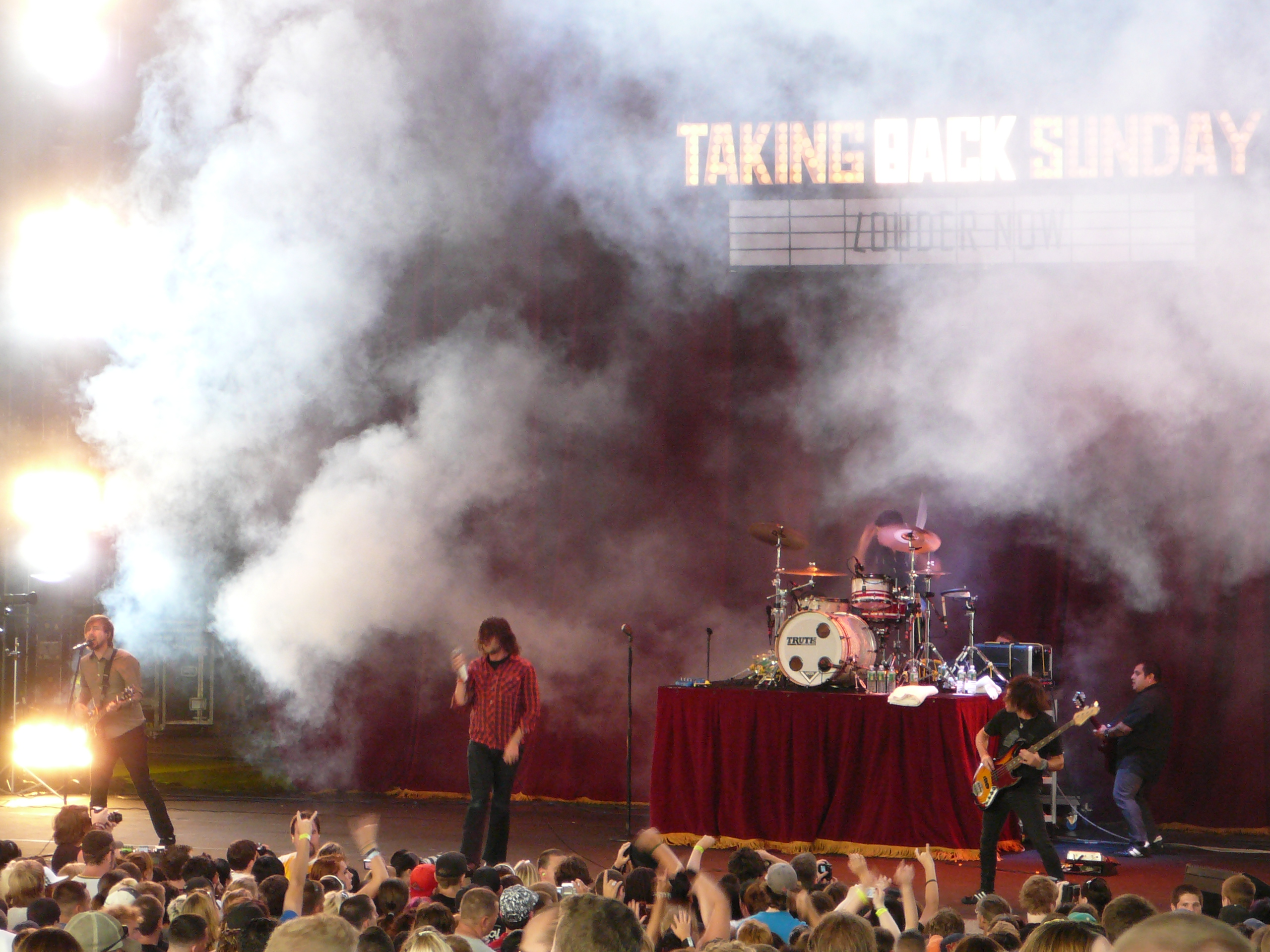
Taking Back Sunday performing on the Projekt Revolution tour in Mansfield, Massachusetts on August 24, 2007

Production on Taking Back Sunday's third album began in April 2005, when Lazzara stated that the band was in "the early stages" of writing new songs. During this time, they were on a co-headlining tour with Jimmy Eat World; they would introduce two new tracks, "Error: Operator" and "What's It Feel Like to Be a Ghost?" during these shows. On June 10, 2005, it was announced that the band had signed with major label Warner Bros. Records and would begin recording their third album later in 2005. "Error: Operator" would become the first song from the upcoming album to be released when it was added to the video-game adaption of Fantastic Four; it was later added to the film's soundtrack as well.

On September 21, 2005, it was announced that Taking Back Sunday had begun recording their third album. With Eric Valentine at the helm, recording commenced at Barefoot Studios in Los Angeles. The group chose Valentine because he had produced Queens of the Stone Age's Songs for the Deaf (2002) and Third Eye Blind's self-titled album (1997). The band had attempted to secure Valentine as producer for Where You Want to Be, but were unable to. During the sessions, the band strived to take a more rock-oriented instrumental approach without compromising their whole compositional style. By January 2006, the album was completed, and the album's title was revealed the following month as Louder Now.

Louder Now was released on April 25, 2006 through Warner Bros. Records. The members' comments on the album reflected the dramatic change the band had undergone in the two years since their last release. Matt Rubano noted that the move to a major label was not something the band took lightly, but it was a move that made sense given the band's tumultuous past.

On October 30, 2006, the band's former record label, Victory Records, released Notes from the Past, which featured four songs from Tell All Your Friends, six songs from Where You Want To Be, and two B-sides: The Ballad of Sal Villanueva and Your Own Disaster ('04 mix). The band then released Louder Now: Part Two on November 20, 2007, a DVD of unreleased live concert footage from their show at Long Beach Arena in Long Beach, California, which included special features such as the video for "Twenty-Twenty Surgery", made to be released in Europe. In 2007, the band contributed the song "What's It Feel Like to Be a Ghost?" to the soundtrack for the science fiction action film Transformers, although the song did not appear in the film.

=== Departure of Fred Mascherino and New Again (2007–2010) ===
In October 2007, the band announced that Taking Back Sunday and guitarist Fred Mascherino would be parting ways, which came after he decided to focus on his then upcoming solo album with The Color Fred. He was later replaced by Matthew Fazzi, who would provide guitar and backing vocals. Mascherino went on to reveal in later interviews: "There were just problems between the five of us about writing, who was going to do it and how we were going to do it, we weren't being very productive because we were fighting too much about that stuff. The band was more about cooking food than making music." This statement inspired the band to write the track "Capital M-E", which features lyrical references to Mascherino's departure and the comments he made afterward. In 2010, Fred Mascherino posted a picture of himself and Adam Lazzara with the caption, "Today was a good day" indicating that he and Lazzara have since made up and are on good terms again.

On November 6, 2008, Taking Back Sunday revealed in Rolling Stone that their fourth studio album was to be titled New Again and would feature the tracks "Winter Passing", "Lonely Lonely", "Catholic Knees", and "Carpathia". They stated that "Winter Passing" was "... a slow dance like the last song at your 8th grade dance [that] moves more like an R&B tune than a rock and roll song", and that "Carpathia" will include the first bass solos in any Taking Back Sunday song. They also commented that "Catholic Knees" is "one of the heavier songs we've ever written", and that "Lonely Lonely" is "relentless – two and a half minutes of punching you in the face". In the build-up to the release of New Again, the band released a number of tracks—the first of which was "Carpathia"—on December 21, 2008, as free digital downloads to those who purchased the band's Christmas holiday set, with a physical limited vinyl release of the track as well as a live version of "Catholic Knees" released on April 18, 2009. The title track "New Again" followed as a free single download from the band's website on April 16, 2009, followed by the first full single "Sink into Me", released on April 20, 2009, premiering on BBC Radio 1's Zane Lowe show, and being made available digitally short after. On May 16, 2009, "Everything Must Go" was released to stream on the band's MySpace. Every Monday, the band released a new song on their MySpace from New Again labeling it "New Music Monday".

During their tour supporting New Again, the band played in Dublin, Ireland where guitarist Matt Fazzi fractured his foot. Despite this, the show in Belfast, Northern Ireland went on and the rest of the tour was completed, which included stops in the UK at Sonisphere Festival and the Kerrang! awards show. On August 18, 2009, the band released a digital live album entitled Live from Bamboozle '09. The album consists of 13 live tracks recorded at The Bamboozle, where they played in May of the same year. In September 2009, the band announced they will be co-headlining with The All-American Rejects and Anberlin for a full US tour. They are also set to release a live acoustic DVD around spring 2010 following the tour.

"Winter Passing" did not make it to the final release of New Again; it was released on February 12, 2010 on their official website.

Throughout February and March the band played the Australian Soundwave tour, playing songs from various albums to crowds of almost 30,000.

=== Taking Back Sunday and lineup change (2010–2012) ===
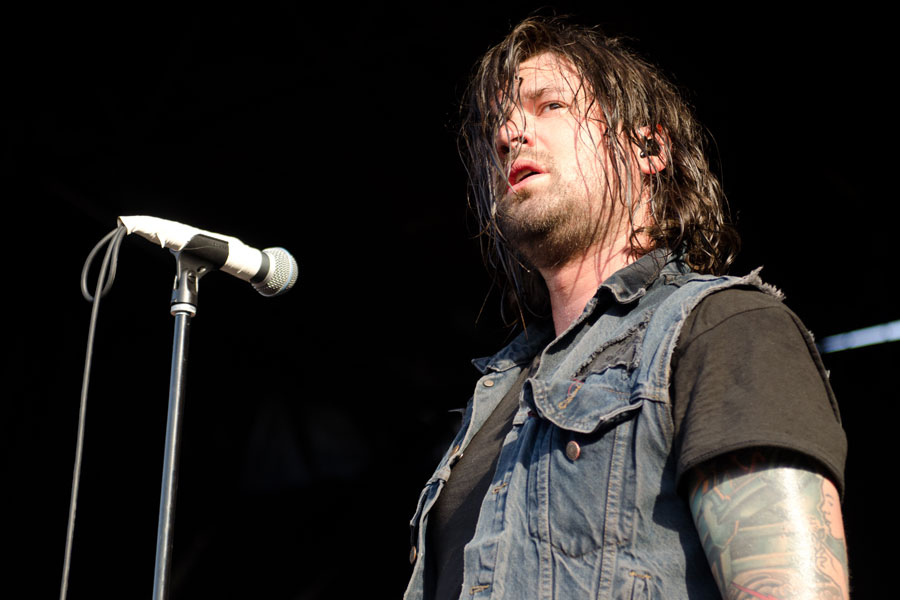
Vocalist Adam Lazzara performing with Taking Back Sunday on Warped Tour 2012

On March 29, 2010, Matt Rubano and Matthew Fazzi announced that they were no longer members of Taking Back Sunday. On April 12, after some social media hints, the band made an official announcement confirming that John Nolan and Shaun Cooper had re-joined the band. It was announced that they would soon begin the recording process of their fifth studio album with Louder Now producer Eric Valentine. On the same day, Adam Lazzara did an interview with Alternative Press, in which he discussed how the original line-up got back together and how both Matt Rubano and Matt Fazzi were not fired, but rather "let go". The band finished writing in El Paso with around 15 songs completed, according to Mark O'Connell. Pre-production on the new album began on August 17, 2010, the same day their live acoustic album Live from Orensanz was released. On December 20, 2010, the band put out a new Christmas song entitled "Merry Christmas I Missed You So Much".

On April 6, 2011, the band played at Maxwell's in Hoboken, New Jersey, to record footage for an upcoming video for the song "El Paso". "Faith (When I Let You Down)" was released as the official first single from the album on May 3, 2011, with an acoustic version of "Great Romances of the 20th Century" as the b-side. On June 7, 2011, the second official single "This Is All Now" was released on iTunes, with the b-side being an acoustic version of "Ghost Man on Third". On June 26, 2011, in an interview with Robert Herrera of Punkvideosrock.com, Mark and Shaun stated that the reason they returned to their original lineup was because they no longer felt it was Taking Back Sunday without the original members. Mark stated they were miserable as a band, weren't having fun, and didn't like the direction the band was going so they decided to reach out to the original members and after meeting with the band in Texas found that "the chemistry was still there."

On July 8, 2011, Taking Back Sunday released an official music video for "Faith (When I Let You Down)". On November 3, 2011, Taking Back Sunday released an official music video for "You Got Me". Taking Back Sunday played Warped Tour 2012 at all locations. In honor of Record Store Day 2012, the band released a limited press vinyl LP entitled "We Play Songs", featuring four live acoustic tracks.

=== TAYF10 anniversary tour (2012–2013) ===
Taking Back Sunday embarked on a "Tell All Your Friends" 10th anniversary tour for 2012, during which the band performed their debut album in its entirety. The full US tour featured Bayside as main support, with Transit, Man Overboard and Gabriel the Marine as special guests. An audio and video recording of the acoustic version of the tour was released for digital download through the band's website on June 18, 2013.

On June 7, 2013, 2:33PM, Taking Back Sunday took to Twitter to confirm that the recording of their 6th studio album had begun; they tweeted: "Phase one of recording the new record starts now... Happy Friday!" The band, who are working alongside producers Marc Jacob Hudson and Ray Jeffrey, have confirmed that pre-production of the 6th studio record has been completed, and that drum and bass tracking has begun.

On August 29, 2013, Adam Lazzara and John Nolan performed an acoustic set at the Leaky Lifeboat Inn, in Seaford, New York, where they debuted a new song with a working title, "The Bird You Cannot Change".

From October 25 through November 2, Underoath vocalist Spencer Chamberlain began filling in on lead vocals following the premature birth of Adam Lazzara's son. On November 8, Lazzara and Nolan performed at the Staller Center for the Arts at Stony Brook University as an acoustic act. This featured the appearance of a Stony Brook violinist named Dylan Ebrahimian who also will appear on Taking Back Sunday's next album due in 2014.

=== Happiness Is, Tidal Wave and departure of Eddie Reyes (2014–2019) ===
On January 11, 2014, Taking Back Sunday revealed that a new album, Happiness Is, was available for pre-order on iTunes, as was a new track: "Flicker, Fade". Happiness Is was released on March 18, 2014, through Hopeless Records.

On June 27, 2016, the band's next album, Tidal Wave, was announced for release on September 16. Material for the album was written in between tours for Happiness Is.

On April 13, 2018, it was announced that founding guitarist Eddie Reyes has parted ways with the band. This was later confirmed by Reyes, stating the reason for his departure was due to his battle with alcoholism and hoped to join the band again in the future. In the meantime, he has also stated to have started a new band.

On the subject of ever touring with previous members of Taking Back Sunday, John Nolan said in an interview: "I don't think that's something that really interests us. This lineup has been together for three albums now and we're really focused on continuing to develop and evolve together. Revisiting old songs with past band members just seem like an exercise in nostalgia."

On January 11, 2019, the band released a compilation album called Twenty to celebrate their 20th anniversary, along with a worldwide tour.

In 2019, for their 20th Anniversary tour, the band employed the use of a specially made coin to flip at shows in locations where they were playing two nights in a row. The coin toss decided the second album to be played the first night of the pair of shows, either Louder Now or Where You Want to Be. "Tell All Your Friends" was played each night.

In December 2019, John Nolan said that the band was not currently on a label, indicating that they left Hopeless Records.

=== 152 and O'Connell's departure (2020–present) ===
In February 2020, the band returned to the studio to begin work on their eighth studio album. Further sessions were cancelled or otherwise postponed, however, on account of the COVID-19 pandemic. In April 2021, Lazzara and Nolan collaborated on a song with Q-Unique, DJ Eclipse and the Wu-Tang Clan's Cappadonna, titled "Verrazzano Villains". In October 2021, the band shared a cover of the Weezer song "My Name is Jonas". The band returned to touring in 2022, including UK dates with Alkaline Trio and North American dates in support of My Chemical Romance. Also in 2022, the band reissued Tell All Your Friends for its 20th anniversary, and released two collaborative singles: "Loved You a Little" with The Maine, and "Just Us Two" with Steve Aoki.

In June 2023, the band released their first original new music in over four years, a single titled "The One". 152, the band's eighth studio album, was released on October 27, 2023, via Fantasy Records. The band performed at Coachella 2024 in April. On December 7, 2024, Fred Mascherino performed with the band for the first time since 2007, at the Starland Ballroom in Sayreville, New Jersey. Mascherino played guitar and sang "Liar (It Takes One to Know One)" and "MakeDamnSure," trading vocals with Nolan on the latter.

In December 2024, former member Eddie Reyes claimed on a podcast that drummer Mark O'Connell, who had been in Taking Back Sunday since 2001, was no longer in the band. O'Connell formally announced his departure on January 7, 2025. He wrote in a statement, "Over the past few years, I’ve focused on my family and personal growth, including committing to my sobriety. Unfortunately, during this time, I didn’t always feel the support I needed from those I thought of as brothers, and creative differences made it hard to move forward together."

In July 2025, Fred Mascherino announced that he would rejoin Taking Back Sunday in a touring capacity while John Nolan is taking "a short break from touring to spend time with his family". The band will also play festival dates as a six-piece, with Lazzara, Nolan and Mascherino all sharing vocal duties. That same month, O'Connell sued his former bandmates for defamation, alleging that Taking Back Sunday spread false damaging claims about O'Connell and withheld royalty payments from him.

In February 2026, the band was announced as part of the lineup for the Louder Than Life music festival in Louisville, scheduled to take place in September.

In 2026, former members Mark O'Connell and Eddie Reyes formed a new band together named ME.

== Musical style and influences ==
Taking Back Sunday has been described as emo, post-hardcore, pop-punk, alternative rock, and post-punk. The band has also veered into the sounds of pop rock, emo pop, and hard rock. Charles Spano of AllMusic described the band as a "New York-based emo band that blend[s] Southern California post-punk, nu metal and old school hardcore." Despite this, Lazzara has rejected the labeling of his band as an emo group.

In a 2003 interview, Shaun Cooper stated that there was little overlap between each members' influences: "Eddie is a big Quicksand fan, John The Smiths and Morrissey, Adam is a big Lifetime fan, Mark loves Hatebreed, and I love punk rock like (...) Rancid, Dropkick, and all those bands. It is just a big mixture." Shaun Cooper and Mark O'Connell have also cited Screeching Weasel and the Queers, while John Nolan's influences range from Nirvana, Pearl Jam, and Built to Spill to the Get Up Kids and the Promise Ring. Jay-Z also significantly impacted Lazarra and Nolan's vocal deliveries. During his time with the band, Ed Reyes' guitar playing drew from Bad Religion guitarist Brian Baker, Walter Schreifels of Quicksand, and the Cure frontman Robert Smith. Since then, Taking Back Sunday have cited Radiohead, Nirvana, the Clash, and Ramones as influences or inspirations.

== Band members ==
Current

- John Nolan – vocals, lead guitar, keyboards, (1999–2003; 2010–present)
- Adam Lazzara – lead vocals (2001–present); bass guitar, vocals (2000–2001)
- Shaun Cooper – bass guitar (2001–2003; 2010–present)

== Discography ==
Studio albums

- Tell All Your Friends (2002)
- Where You Want to Be (2004)
- Louder Now (2006)
- New Again (2009)
- Taking Back Sunday (2011)
- Happiness Is (2014)
- Tidal Wave (2016)
- 152 (2023)
