= MakeDamnSure =

Single by Taking Back Sunday

from the album Louder Now
- Released: March 14, 2006
- Recorded: 2005
- Genre: Pop-punk; emo
- Length: 3:32
- Label: Warner Bros.
- Songwriters: Adam Lazzara; Fred Mascherino; Mark O'Connell; Eddie Reyes; Matt Rubano
- Producer: Eric Valentine

Taking Back Sunday singles chronology
"This Photograph Is Proof (I Know You Know)" (2005)	"MakeDamnSure" (2006)	"Twenty-Twenty Surgery" (2006)

"MakeDamnSure" (originally titled "You're So Cool") is a song by American rock band Taking Back Sunday. It was released as the first single from their third album, Louder Now. "MakeDamnSure" was released to radio on March 14, 2006. It has experienced much more success than the band's other singles on the Billboard Hot 100 and Alternative Songs chart. It is their most successful single to date, peaking at number 48 on the Hot 100 and number 8 on the Alternative charts.

The song ranked at number 52 on Rolling Stone's "The 100 Best Songs of 2006".

== Music video ==
The music video for the song "MakeDamnSure" (directed by Marc Klasfeld) switches between scenes of the band playing in a wind tunnel and scenes of violence and destruction (such as a car crashing from a cliff, or bombs exploding in a village). The wind in the tunnel gradually increases, and when the loud chorus part repeats for the last time, it almost blows them away. As the song slows down, the violent images are replayed, but this time, they are transformed into a short scene considered to be happy, i.e. the scene of the police officers using fire hoses on protesters turns into a scene of a woman watering her plants, and the Cincinnati Reds' former stadium being demolished turns into a shore view. The video ends as Adam Lazzara, who's viewed singing in profile, slowly turns into a boy, who blows on the microphone, which has turned into a dandelion, whose seeds blow away, and then starts running in an open field, as the camera pans upwards and the video fades away.

The video was premiered on MTV2 on April 3, 2006.

== Track listing ==
CD Single / UK CD # 1:

1. "MakeDamnSure" - 3:32
2. "Sleep" - 3:20

7" Vinyl:

1. "MakeDamnSure"
2. "Sleep"

Enhanced CD / UK CD # 2:

1. "MakeDamnSure" - 3:33
2. "What's It Feel like to be a Ghost?" (Live) - 3:50
3. "Error: Operator" (Live) - 3:03
4. "MakeDamnSure" (Video) - 3:29

== Charts ==
=== Weekly charts ===
Weekly chart performance for "MakeDamnSure"
Chart (2006)	Peak position
Canada Rock (Billboard)	36
Scottish Singles Sales (Official Charts)	28
UK Singles (Official Charts)	36
UK Rock & Metal (Official Charts)	1
US Billboard Hot 100	48
US Alternative Airplay (Billboard)	8

=== Year-end charts ===
Year-end chart performance for "MakeDamnSure"
Chart (2006)	Position
US Alternative Songs (Billboard)	28

== Certifications ==
Certifications for "MakeDamnSure"
Region	Certification	Certified units/sales
United Kingdom (BPI)	Silver	200,000^{‡}
^{‡} Sales+streaming figures based on certification alone.

== Release history ==
Release dates and formats for "MakeDamnSure"
Region	Date	Format	Label(s)	Ref.
United States	August 8, 2006	Mainstream airplay	Warner Bros.	
