= Adam Lazzara =

American singer (born 1981)

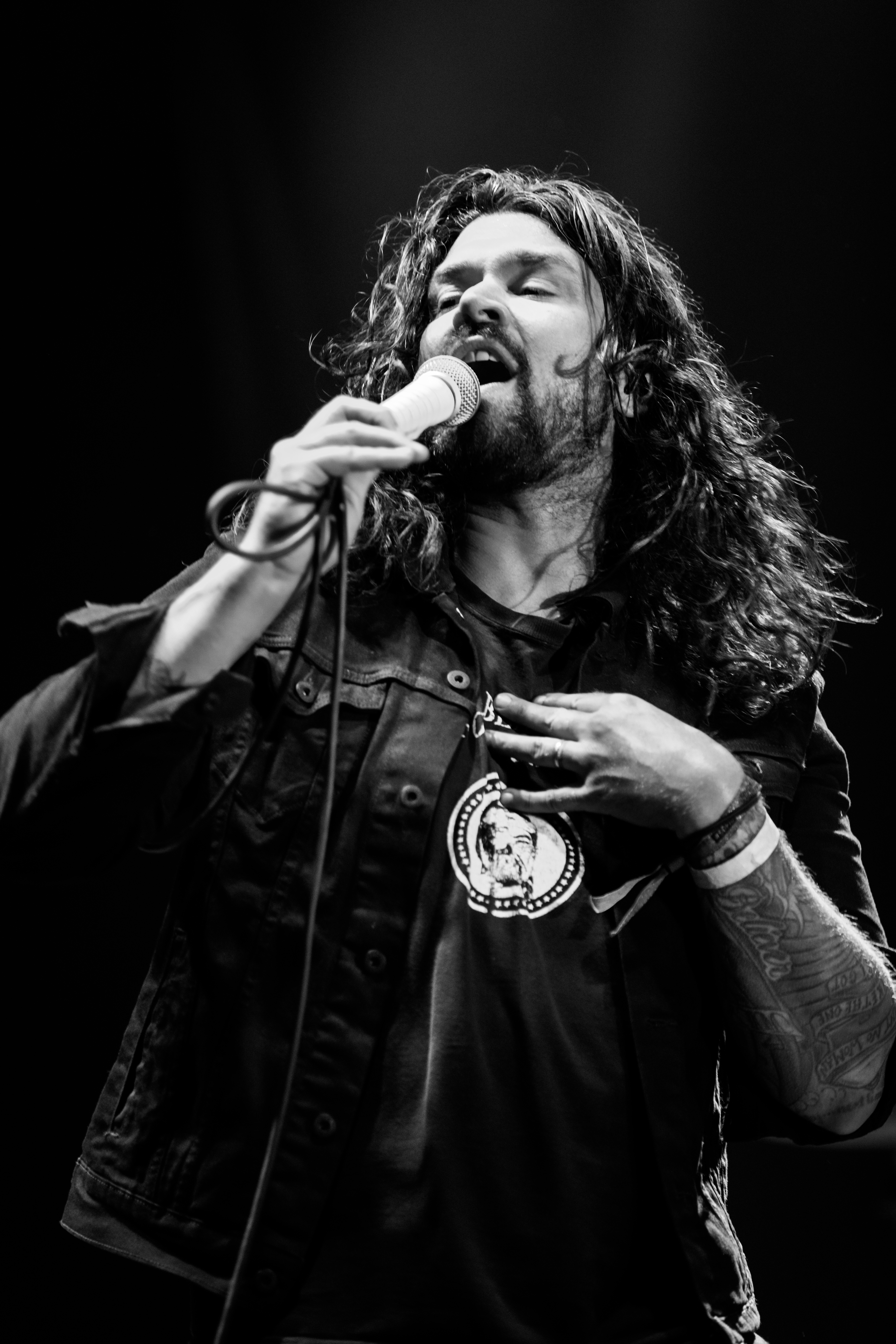
- Lazzara in 2018
- Born: September 22, 1981 (age 44); Sheffield, Alabama, U.S.
- Occupations: Singer; songwriter; musician
- Years active: 1999–present
- Spouse: Misha Vaagen (m. 2008)
- Children: 3
- Musical career
- Genres: Alternative rock; emo; post-hardcore; emo pop; pop-punk; pop rock; folk
- Instruments: Vocals; guitar; bass guitar; harmonica
- Labels: Hopeless; Warner Bros.; Victory

Adam Lazzara (born September 22, 1981) is an American musician. He is the lead vocalist of the rock band Taking Back Sunday. Along with singing lead vocals, Lazzara plays guitar and occasionally the harmonica.

== Early life ==
Lazzara was born on September 22, 1981 in Sheffield, Alabama to an Italian family. His family moved to High Point, North Carolina when he was a young child and he attended Southwest Guilford Elementary School, Middle School and High School. Looking back at this time, Lazzara has described himself as a quiet, shy kid who had a stutter and wanted to be a dolphin trainer. At age 13, he was introduced to Nirvana for the first time and began to "live and breathe rock music." He started playing in bands throughout high school and was inspired by artists like Nirvana, Michael Jackson, and Lifetime and "skateboarded everywhere until I was probably 19 or 20."

"I heard Nirvana and my whole world changed forever. Later on, maybe when I was about 14 years old, an older friend of mine let me borrow Earth Crisis’ Destroy the Machines and Lifetime’s Hello Bastards. [...] that Lifetime record changed my whole world all over again. Even when I listen to it now, it gives me this feeling that I can’t describe. That lead me to searching out bands on labels like Jade Tree and so on."
– Adam Lazzara, interviewed by Mischa Pearlman.

== Taking Back Sunday ==
=== Joining the band ===
Adam Lazzara initially met the members of Taking Back Sunday at a show in Greensboro, North Carolina. At the performance, Phil Hanratty of the band Errortype:11 was filling in for Taking Back Sunday’s bassist. Lazzara, whose high school band had performed in a show earlier that year with Errortype:11, connected with Hanratty before the show. Hanratty informed Lazzara that Taking Back Sunday’s bassist, Jesse Lacey, had recently left to start his own band, "Brand New," and Taking Back Sunday was looking for a new bassist. He stayed after the show to meet them and asked to try out for the open bassist slot. They said yes, and about a month later, Lazzara drove from North Carolina to Long Island to try out. A week after that, Eddie Reyes, the guitarist of Taking Back Sunday at the time, called Lazzara and asked if he wanted to play with them for a couple of shows. Lazzara booked a flight to New York in 2001 and by the end of that year, he had gone from temporary bassist to the band's frontman.

=== Early years ===
Taking Back Sunday recorded their first album with Mike Sapone, which was then burned onto CD’s at band members Shaun Cooper and Mark O'Connell’s apartment. In the Spring of 2002, they released their debut album "Tell All Your Friends" with Victory Records. They did two tours after that release and began selling out venues they opened for only a year before. In 2004, they went on to release “Where You Want To Be” which became one of the top-selling independently released rock records of the year. It debuted at No. 3 on Billboard 200 and reached No. 16 on Billboard's Modern Rock chart. In the following year, they signed with Warner Bros.

=== Breakout album ===
In April of 2006, Taking Back Sunday put out their third album, "Louder Now". The album contained the hit song "Make Damn Sure" which is largely thought of as their breakout song and is their most successful song to date. It peaked at number 48 on the Billboard Hot 100, number 8 on the Alternative charts, and ranked number 52 on Rolling Stone's "The 100 Best Songs of 2006"

=== Taking Back Sunday today ===
Today, the current members of Taking Back Sunday are: Adam Lazzara (lead vocals), John Nolan (lead guitar, keyboards, vocals), Shaun Cooper (bass guitar) accompanied by Nathan Cogan (guitar) for their live performances.

== Personal life ==
Lazzara was briefly engaged to Chauntelle Dupree, guitarist of Eisley, in 2007, but the pair split before marrying.

He went on to meet Misha Vaagen, a student, poet at UT Tyler and bartender at a local restaurant. They were married in June 2008 and had their first child in January 2009. They currently live in North Carolina with their three children. Misha is the author of Manmade Constellations.

In February 2015, Lazzara was arrested for a DWI while in Charlotte, North Carolina. He was released on a $2,500 bond.

== Discography ==
With Taking Back Sunday

- Tell All Your Friends (2002)
- Where You Want To Be (2004)
- Louder Now (2006)
- New Again (2009)
- Taking Back Sunday (2011)
- Happiness Is (2014)
- Tidal Wave (2016)
- 152 (2023)

Solo

- "Because It Works" (2013)
