= List of Taking Back Sunday band members =

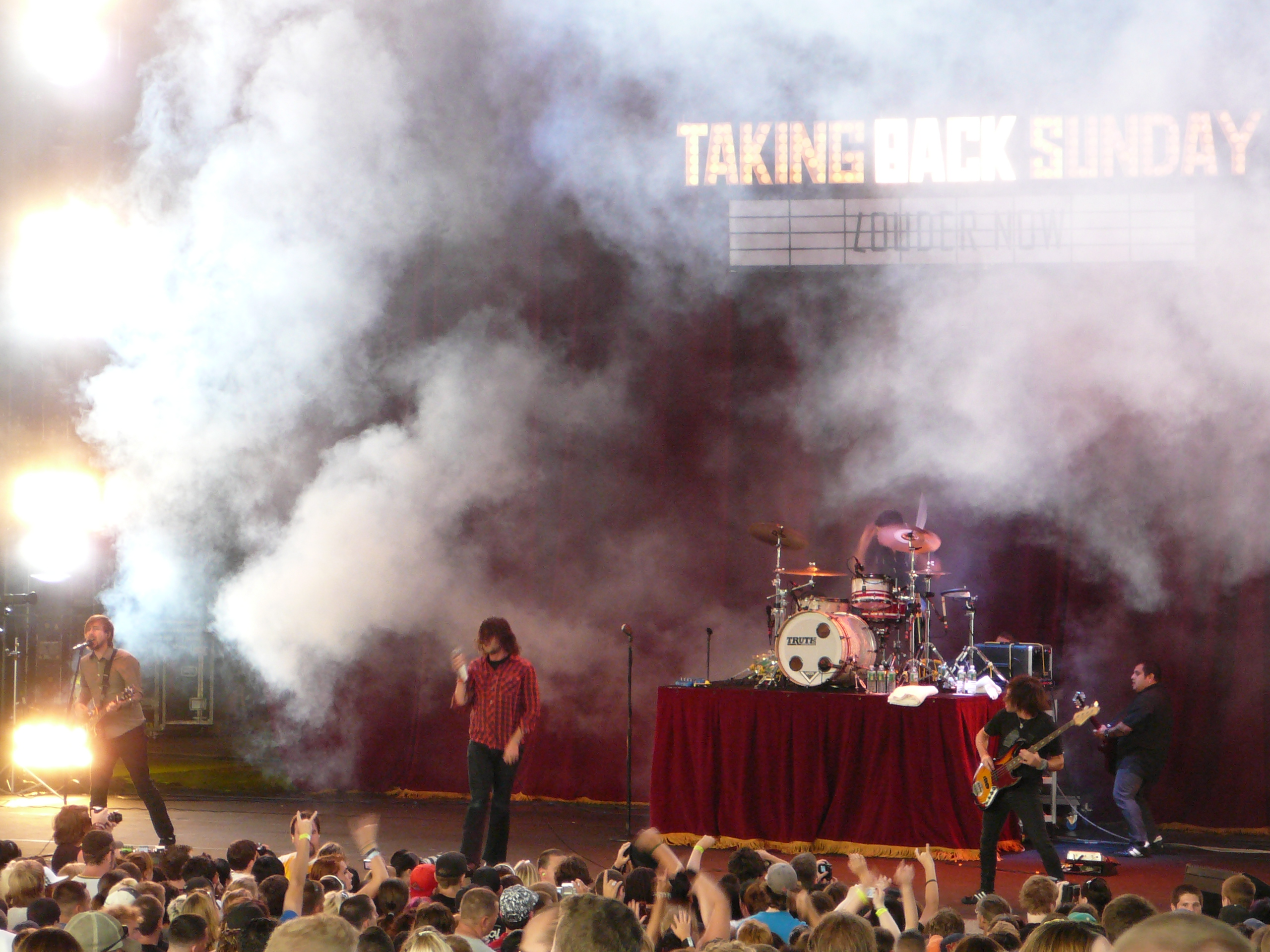
Taking Back Sunday performing on the Projekt Revolution tour in Mansfield, Massachusetts on August 24, 2007.

Taking Back Sunday is an American rock band from Long Island, New York, formed in 1999 and featuring the current line-up of Adam Lazzara (lead vocals), John Nolan (guitar, vocals, keyboards), and Shaun Cooper (bass guitar), accompanied on tour by Nathan Cogan (guitars, keyboards), and Mitchell Register (drums, percussion). The group was originally formed by Antonio Longo, John Nolan, Eddie Reyes, Jesse Lacey, and Steven DeJoseph. The band has gone through multiple line-up changes in their career spanning eight studio albums. There have been eleven official members of Taking Back Sunday, four touring members, and twenty-three session members.

The band's first line-up change was in 2001, with the departure of bassist Jesse Lacey and drummer Steven DeJoseph, who were replaced by current members Adam Lazzara and Mark O'Connell. Not long after, original lead vocalist Antonio Longo also departed from the band, leaving Lazzara on lead vocals duty. Being left without a bassist, Eddie Reyes brought in Shaun Cooper to play bass guitar for the band. Soon after the band headed to the studio to record and release their debut studio album, Tell All Your Friends.

The band's second line-up change came when founding member and guitarist, keyboardist, and vocalist John Nolan and bassist Shaun Cooper announced their departure from the band in 2003. Nolan and Cooper were replaced by Fred Mascherino and Matt Rubano, with Mascherino performing guitars and vocals, along with Rubano performing bass guitar. With a fresh line-up, the band went onto release two more studio albums, Where You Want to Be and major label debut, Louder Now.

The band's third line-up change came in 2007, when Fred Mascherino left the band to pursue his solo project, The Color Fred and later his current band, Terrible Things. He was replaced by Matthew Fazzi, who was announced to be an official member on 2008, providing guitars, keyboards, and vocals. Mascherino went on to reveal in later interviews stating, "There were just problems between the five of us about writing, who was going to do it and how we were going to do it, we weren't being very productive because we were fighting too much about that stuff. The band was more about cooking food than making music." With continued extensive touring with the new line-up, the band went on to release their only studio album with Fazzi, New Again.

The next line-up change came in 2010 when Matt Rubano and Matthew Fazzi announced that they were no longer members of Taking Back Sunday. Later it was announced that John Nolan and Shaun Cooper had re-joined the band. With the reunion of the Tell All Your Friends line-up in seven years, the band went onto release Taking Back Sunday, Happiness Is, and Tidal Wave.

The next line-up change wouldn't come until 2018, when the band announced that they have parted ways with founding member and guitarist, Eddie Reyes for "personal reasons". This was later confirmed by Reyes stating the reason for his departure was due to his battle with alcoholism. The band released their eighth studio album 152 in 2023.

Longtime drummer O'Connell announced his departure in 2024. In July 2025, it was announced that former guitarist Fred Mascherino would return to the band as a touring member, originally on a temporary basis while Nolan went to spend time with his family. Mascherino would later appear on stage with Nolan. No plans of Mascherino's status with the band has been announced.

== Official members ==
=== Current ===
Image	Name	Years active	Instruments	Release contributions
	John Nolan	1999–2003; 2010–present	lead guitar; vocals; keyboards	all Taking Back Sunday releases from Taking Back Sunday EP (2000) to Tell All Your Friends (2002) and from Taking Back Sunday (2011)
	Adam Lazzara	2001–present	lead vocals; bass guitar (2000, 2003)	all Taking Back Sunday releases from Taking Back Sunday EP (2000)
	Shaun Cooper	2001–2003; 2010–present	bass guitar	all Taking Back Sunday releases from Tell All Your Friends Demo (2001) to Tell All Your Friends (2002) and from Taking Back Sunday (2011)

=== Former ===
Image	Name	Years active	Instruments	Release contributions
	Eddie Reyes	1999–2018	rhythm guitar; lead guitar (2003, 2007)	all Taking Back Sunday releases from Taking Back Sunday EP (2000) to Tidal Wave (2016)
	Antonio Longo	1999–2001	lead vocals	Taking Back Sunday EP (2000) and Lullaby EP (2001)
	Jesse Lacey	1999–2000	bass guitar; backing vocals	Taking Back Sunday EP (2000)
	Steven DeJoseph	1999–2000	drums; percussion	Taking Back Sunday EP (2000)
	Mark O'Connell	2000–2024	drums; percussion	all Taking Back Sunday releases from Lullaby EP (2001) to 152 (2023)
	Matt Rubano	2003–2010	bass guitar; backing vocals	all Taking Back Sunday releases from Where You Want to Be (2004) to Live from Orensanz (2010)
	Fred Mascherino	2003–2007; 2024 (live); 2025–present (live)	lead guitar; vocals	all Taking Back Sunday releases from Where You Want to Be (2004) to Louder Now: PartTwo (2007)
	Matthew Fazzi	2008–2010	lead guitar; keyboards; vocals	all Taking Back Sunday releases from New Again (2009) to Live from Orensanz (2010)

== Other contributors ==
=== Touring ===
Image	Name	Years active	Instruments	Release contributions
	Phil Hanratty	2000	bass	none
	Aaron Stern	2007	drums; percussion	none
	Isaac Bolivar	2009–2010	guitars; keyboards; backing vocals	Live from Bamboozle '09 (2009) and Live from Orensanz (2010)
	Nathan Cogan	2010–present	guitars; keyboards; backing vocals	We Play Songs (2012), TAYF10 Acoustic (2013), and 152 (2023)
	Spencer Chamberlain	2013	lead vocals	none
	Mitchell Register	2024–present	drums; percussion	none

=== Session ===
Image	Name	Years active	Instruments	Release contributions
	Michelle DaRosa	2001–2002; 2013	backing vocals	Tell All Your Friends (2002) and TAYF10 Acoustic (2013)
	Neil Rubenstein	2001–2002; 2004	backing vocals	Tell All Your Friends (2002) and Where You Want to Be (2004)
	Matt McDannell	2001–2002	backing vocals	Tell All Your Friends (2002)
	Sal Villanueva	2001–2002	guitars	Tell All Your Friends (2002)
	Girl Next Door String Quartet	2004	violins; violas; cellos; double basses	Where You Want to Be (2004)
	Mike Sapone	2004	programming	Where You Want to Be (2004)
	Nick Torres	2004	backing vocals	Where You Want to Be (2004)
	Ray Zu-Artez	2004	piano; string arrangement; string conductor	Where You Want to Be (2004)
	Elena Mascherino	2005–2006	backing vocals	Louder Now (2006)
	Anton Patzner	2005–2006	violins; violas; string arrangement	Louder Now (2006)
	Lewis Patzner	2005–2006	cello	Louder Now (2006)
	Dylan Ebrahimian	2013–2014	violin	Happiness Is (2014)
	Teddy Schumacher	2013–2014	cello	Happiness Is (2014)
	Elyse Hurley	2016	backing vocals	Tidal Wave (2016)
	Ryan Hurley	2016	backing vocals	Tidal Wave (2016)
	Keaton Lazzara	2016	backing vocals	Tidal Wave (2016)
	Misha Lazzara	2016	backing vocals	Tidal Wave (2016)
	Nathan Lazzara	2016	backing vocals	Tidal Wave (2016)
	Camille Nolan	2016	backing vocals	Tidal Wave (2016)
	John John Nolan	2016	backing vocals	Tidal Wave (2016)
	Greg Urquhart	2016	backing vocals	Tidal Wave (2016)
	Kara Urquhart	2016	backing vocals	Tidal Wave (2016)
	Ryleigh Varvaro	2016	backing vocals	Tidal Wave (2016)
	Nick Montopoli	2023	strings	152 (2023)

== Timeline ==
Official members timeline

Touring members timeline

== Line-ups ==
Period	Members	Releases
November 1999 - Early 2000	Antonio Longo – vocals; John Nolan – guitar, backing vocals; Eddie Reyes – guitar; Jesse Lacey – bass, backing vocals; Steven DeJoseph – drums	Taking Back Sunday EP (2000) Songs 4 & 6
Mid 2000 - Early 2001	Antonio Longo – vocals; John Nolan – guitar, backing vocals; Eddie Reyes – guitar; Adam Lazzara – bass, backing vocals; Mark O'Connell – drums	Taking Back Sunday EP (2000) Songs 1-3 & 5 to Lullaby EP (2001)
Early 2001 - Mid 2003	Adam Lazzara – vocals; John Nolan – guitar, backing vocals; Eddie Reyes – guitar; Shaun Cooper – bass; Mark O'Connell – drums	Tell All Your Friends Demo (2001) to Tell All Your Friends (2002)
Mid 2003 - Late 2007	Adam Lazzara – vocals; Fred Mascherino – guitar, backing vocals; Eddie Reyes – guitar; Matt Rubano – bass; Mark O'Connell – drums	Where You Want to Be (2004) to The Louder Now: PartTwo (2007)
Early 2008 - Early 2010	Adam Lazzara – vocals; Matthew Fazzi – guitar, backing vocals; Eddie Reyes – guitar; Matt Rubano – bass; Mark O'Connell – drums	New Again (2009) to Live from Orensanz (2010)
Early 2010 - Early 2018	Adam Lazzara – vocals; John Nolan – guitar, backing vocals; Eddie Reyes – guitar; Shaun Cooper – bass; Mark O'Connell – drums	Taking Back Sunday (2011) to Tidal Wave (2016)
Early 2018 - Late 2024	Adam Lazzara – vocals; John Nolan – guitar, backing vocals; Shaun Cooper – bass; Mark O'Connell – drums	Twenty (2019) to 152 (2023)
Early 2025 - Present	Adam Lazzara – vocals; John Nolan – guitar, backing vocals; Shaun Cooper – bass	None
