= Longo =

Longo is a surname. Notable people with the surname include:

- Achille Longo (1864–1945), Italian composer and music teacher
- Alessandro Longo (1864–1945), Italian composer and musicologist
- Andrea Longo (disambiguation), multiple people
- Andrej Longo (born 1959), Italian writer
- Annalie Longo (born 1991), New Zealand women's football player
- Antonio Longo (disambiguation), multiple people
- Bartolo Longo (1841–1926), Italian lawyer, beatified by the Roman Catholic Church
- Carlos Ortiz Longo (born 1962), Puerto Rican mechanical and materials science engineer
- Christian Longo (born 1974), convicted murderer
- Davide Longo (born 1975), professional rugby league player
- Dennise Longo Quiñones (fl. 1990s–2010s), Puerto Rican lawyer and government official
- Evan Longoria (born 1985), nicknamed Longo
- Gaetano Longo (1865–1900), Italian mass murderer
- Gonzalo Longo (born 1974), Argentine rugby union footballer
- Jeannie Longo (born 1958), French racing cyclist
- Joseph S. Longo (1914–1993), Justice of the Connecticut Supreme Court
- Luigi Longo (1900–1980), Italian communist politician
- Mike Longo (1937–2020), American jazz pianist, composer, and author
- Robert Longo (born 1953), American painter and sculptor
- Roberto Longo (cyclist) (born 1984), Italian road racing cyclist
- Roberto Longo (mathematician) (born 1953), Italian mathematician and mathematical physicist
- Saadia ben Abraham Longo (fl. 16th century), Turkish Hebrew poet
- Samuele Longo (born 1992), Italian professional footballer
- Santiago Longo (born 1998), Argentine professional footballer
- Tom Longo (1942–2015), American football defensive back
- Valter Longo (born 1967), Italian biogerontologist and cell biologist

== See also ==
- Longo's, a supermarket chain in the Greater Toronto Area
- Longos (disambiguation)
- Longus, ancient Greek author
- Luongo, a surname
- Lungo, a coffee beverage
