= The Intervention (EP) =

EP by The Color Fred
- Released: April 18, 2009
- Genre: Acoustic, indie rock
- Length: 28:54
- Label: Equal Vision
- Producer: Brandon Weiss, Myles Vlachos

The Color Fred chronology
Bend to Break (2007)	The Intervention (2009)	A Year and Change (2022)

Professional ratings
Review scores
Source	Rating
Melodic	2.5/5 stars

The Intervention is an EP by indie rock band The Color Fred.

== Background ==
In January 2009, it was revealed that the band was demoing new material.

== Release ==
In March and April 2009, the band went on tour alongside Craig Owens, Ace Enders and A Million Different People, the Gay Blades, VersaEmerge. The EP was released on April 18 through Equal Vision Records. The EP was limited to 1,000 copies. The re-recorded version of "Terrible Things" can be found on Terrible Things debut album. In August, the band went on tour with the Scene Aesthetic and the Ready Set.

== Track listing ==
1. "If I Surrender (Acoustic)" - 4:05
2. "Complaintor (Acoustic)" - 4:19
3. "Terrible Things" - 3:38
4. "The Intervention" - 3:57
5. "Dark Clouds" - 4:47
6. "It Isn't Me (Acoustic)" - 4:09
7. "Hate To See You Go (Demo)" - 3:59

== Personnel ==
- Fred Mascherino - vocals, guitars
- Stephen Curtiss - drums on "Hate to See You Go"
