= Take Apart the Words =

Take Apart The Words

EP by Breaking Pangaea
- Released: December 11, 2000
- Genre: Indie rock
- Label: Undecided

Breaking Pangaea chronology
Take Apart The Words (2000)	Cannon to a Whisper (2001)

Take Apart The Words is the debut EP by Philadelphia emo/indie rock band Breaking Pangaea. It was released in 2000 on Undecided Records. "Lullaby" was later re-recorded and rearranged for Mascherino's later band, Terrible Things.

Exclaim! described the EP as "thick with guitars and raw emotion."

== Track listing ==
1. The Last - 3:32
2. Colors On The Inside - 3:51
3. Under The Talking - 4:32
4. The Truth - 3:17
5. Lullaby - 5:00

== Credits ==
- Fred Mascherino - Guitar, Vocals
- Clint Stelfox - Bass
- Will Noon - Drums
