= Bend to Break =

Studio album by The Color Fred
- Released: October 30, 2007
- Recorded: Millbrook Sound Studios
- Genres: Indie rock, power pop, folk rock
- Length: 40:06
- Label: Equal Vision
- Producer: Lou Giordano

The Color Fred chronology
Bend to Break (2007)	The Intervention (2009)

Professional ratings
Review scores
Source	Rating
AbsolutePunk.net	83%
Melodic	3/5 stars
Rocklouder	4/5 stars

Bend to Break is the debut studio album by the Color Fred, the project of Fred Mascherino (formerly of Taking Back Sunday).

== Release ==
On August 23, 2007, the Color Fred announced they had signed to Equal Vision Records; alongside this, "If I Surrender" was posted on their Myspace profile. On September 26, 2007, Bend to Break was announced for release the following month; alongside this, the track listing and artwork were posted online. On October 12, 2007, "Get Out" was posted on Myspace. Bend to Break was made available for streaming through Myspace, before being released through Equal Vision three days later. It was released in digipak style on "a minimum of 80% post-consumer waste recycled paper". "I like to keep everything I do as close to carbon footprint zero as possible," Mascherino said. "The guys at Equal Vision had to search far and wide to make my packaging goal a reality. But it’s well worth it. It’s really important to me and if everyone else did it, it would make a big difference."

In November and December 2007, the band supported Straylight Run on the headlining tour of the US. On November 28, 2007, a music video was released for "If I Surrender". In February and March 2008, the band supported Angels & Airwaves on their headlining US tour. In early April 2008, the band appeared at the Bamboozle Left festival. Later in the month, the band went on a US tour with Chiodos and then a tour with MxPx, and appeared at the Give it a Name festival in the UK. Following this, the band performed on the Warped Tour between June and August 2008. In October and November, the band supported Hawthorne Heights on their headlining US tour, titled the Never Sleep Again Tour. An acoustic version of "Complaintor" was posted on the group's Myspace profile on March 16, 2009.

== Track listing ==
1. "Get Out" - 2:45
2. "If I Surrender" - 3:53
3. "Hate to See You Go" - 3:55
4. "It Isn't Me" - 3:59
5. "Complaintor" - 3:59
6. "The Tragedy" - 1:08
7. "I Didn't See" - 3:54
8. "Empty House" - 3:08
9. "Minnesota" - 3:24
10. "I'll Never Know" - 3:51
11. "Don't Pretend" - 6:06

== Singles ==
1. "Hate To See You Go"
2. "If I Surrender"

== Personnel ==
- Fred Mascherino – guitar, vocals, bass guitar, keyboard
- Steve Curtiss – drums
- PJ Bond – backing vocals and bass guitar on "Get Out"
- Clint Stelfox – piano on "It Isn't Me", Hammond organ B3 on "Don't Pretend"
- Anton Patzner – violin, viola
- Lewis Patzner – cello, bass
