= Terrible Things (album) =

Studio album by Terrible Things
- Released: August 31, 2010
- Recorded: Birmingham, Alabama
- Genre: Alternative rock
- Length: 39:10
- Label: Universal Motown
- Producer: Jason Elgin

Professional ratings
Review scores
Source	Rating
Allmusic	3.5/5 stars

Terrible Things is the debut album by alternative rock supergroup Terrible Things. The lineup during the recording consisted of former Taking Back Sunday guitarist and The Color Fred lead vocalist Fred Mascherino, guitarist and vocalist Andy Jackson from Hot Rod Circuit, and drummer Josh Eppard from Coheed and Cambria fame.

== Composition ==
"Lullaby" was originally a song by Mascherino's former group Breaking Pangaea, and "Terrible Things" was originally a song by The Color Fred, Mascherino's solo project. Originally called "Initials" the band later changed their name to "Terrible Things" as well as the album title, in addition to the song name. Lynam frontman Jacob Bunton has recorded the bass and piano on the album as the band didn't have a permanent bassist at the time.

== Release ==
On April 26, 2010, "Revolution" was made available for streaming through the group's Myspace account. The track was later released as a single on May 25. On July 15, Terrible Things was announced for release in the following month. As part of this announcement, two songs were made available for streaming: "Wrap Me Up" through AbsolutePunk and "Lullaby" through Alternative Press. In July and August, the group performed a handful of dates on the Warped Tour. Terrible Things was released on August 31 through major label Universal Motown Records. The artwork features Mascherino's two children having a tea party with a dollhouse on fire behind them. He said it was representative of the arson incidents in Coatesville. In October and November, the group went on a US tour with Mae and Windsor Drive. On November 19, a music video released for "Revolution", directed by David Brodsky. In late September and early October 2011, the band toured Australia as part of the Soundwave Counter-Revolution festival.

== Track listing ==
All tracks written by Fred Mascherino and Andy Jackson, except where noted.

No.	Title	Writer(s)	Length
1.	"Intro"	Mascherino	0:44
2.	"Revolution"	Mascherino	3:31
3.	"Up at Night"	Mascherino	3:05
4.	"Lullaby" (Breaking Pangaea cover)	Mascherino, Jackson and Jacob Bunton	4:13
5.	"Terrible Things" (The Color Fred cover)		2:58
6.	"Conspiracy"		3:03
7.	"Wrap Me Up"		2:58
8.	"Been Here Before"		3:40
9.	"Not Alone"	Mascherino, Jackson and Bunton	3:11
10.	"The Hills of Birmingham"		3:40
11.	"The Arsonist's Wife"		5:21
12.	"Can't Be True"		2:51
Total length:			39:10

== Personnel ==
- Fred Mascherino – vocals, guitars
- Andy Jackson – guitars, vocals
- Josh Eppard – drums, percussion, backing vocals
- Jason Elgin – producer

Additional musicians

- Jacob Bunton – bass guitar, piano, organ
- Bethany Borg-Martin – violin
- Avi Friedlander – cello
- Adam Wright – strings arrangement
- Elena Mascherino – vocals on outro
