= Blood and Water (song) =

Single by Palm Springs
- B-side: "Stop Making Plans"
- Released: December 2008
- Length: 3:57
- Label: Rank Records (Berlin)
- Songwriter(s): Cane, Russo

Palm Springs singles chronology
"I Start Fires" (2007)	"Blood and Water" (2008)	"Free Atlas" (2009)

"Blood and Water" is the title of a song, included as the A-side of a 7" single by the British band Palm Springs. The song was originally released in 2007 as a single-sided, ultra-limited edition 7" single commemorating the 1000th edition of Wolfgang Doebeling’s Roots radio show on Berlin's Radio Eins.

In December 2008, "Blood And Water" was released as a 7" single by the Berlin record label Rank Records.

The single is unique in that it's the only Palm Springs record not released on Randoms Acts Of Vinyl.
