= The Hope That Kills You =

Studio album by Palm Springs
- Released: January 2010
- Recorded: 2007–2009 at Church Road Studios, Hove, East Sussex
- Genre: Chamber Pop
- Label: Random Acts Of Vinyl
- Producer: Palm Springs and Paul Pascoe

Palm Springs chronology
No Hurt Like a Broken Heart (2007)	The Hope That Kills You (2010)

Singles from The Hope That Kills You
- 1. "I Start Fires / Twilight Of A Star" Released: 2007; 2. "Blood And Water / Stop Making Plans" Released: 2008; 3. "Free Atlas / Shared History" Released: 2009

Professional ratings
Review scores
Source	Rating
Mojo	4/5 stars
Tatapoum	4.5/5 stars

The Hope That Kills You is a studio album by the band Palm Springs. It is the band's second long-playing record, featuring earlier singles "I Start Fires" (2007), "Blood and Water" (2008) and "Free Atlas" (2009).

== Track listing ==
1. "I Start Fires" (4:04)
2. "No More Shall We Be" (3:27)
3. "Still Life" (3:28)
4. "The Constellation" (3:45)
5. "Free Atlas" (3:36)
6. "Taint And Trespass" (3:09)
7. "Candy Milk" (4:12)
8. "Blood And Water" (3:55)
9. "The Harm Still Hidden" (3:40)
10. "There Is Nothing Left To Love" (4:16)
11. "Bury Me Not" (5:56)

== Personnel ==
All tracks on the album were written and performed by Cane and Russo with the following additional personnel:

- Grant Allardyce – drums on tracks 1, 3, 4, 5, 8, 11; percussion on track 2
- Jane Bartholomew – backing vocals on tracks 2, 9 and 10
- Ellie Blackshaw – violin on tracks 4 and 9
- Neil Cantwell – keyboards on track 11; electric guitar and percussion on track 7; piano on tracks 3–5, 7, 10 and 11
- Sophie Greenhalgh – violin on tracks 2, 4 and 9
- Ros Hanson – viola on tracks 2, 4 and 9
- Gareth Herrick – backing vocals on track 3
- Mark Jesson – cello on tracks 1, 2, 4–11; string arrangements for tracks 2, 4 and 9
- Kah – backing vocals on tracks 1, 4, 6 and 11
- Johny Lamb – cornet and backing vocals on track 3
- Pete Lush – backing vocals on track 3
- Jeffers Mayo – extra electric guitar on track 1
- Sally Megee – backing vocals on tracks 3, 5 and 11
- Paul Pascoe – backing vocals on tracks 1–3, 5, 7, 8, 10 and 11; electric bass on tracks 1, 3, 5, 8, 10 and 11; electric guitar on tracks 4 and 5; harmonium on track 7; Moog synthesizer on track 4
- Matt Sigley – piano and backing vocals on track 8
- DC Cane – cover photography
