= Longos =

Longos may refer to:

- the Greek name for Longus, author of the ancient Greek novel Daphnis and Chloe
- places in Greece:
  - Longos, Achaea, a village in Achaea
  - Longos, Paxoi, a village in the island of Paxoi
  - Longos, Trikala, a village in the municipal unit Estiaiotida, Trikala regional unit
  - Sithonia, a peninsula on the Chalkidiki
- places in the Philippines:
  - Longos, Cabangan, a village in the municipality Cabangan, Zambales, Central Luzon
  - Longos, Kalayaan, a village in the municipality Kalayaan, Laguna, Southern Luzon
  - Longos, Malabon, a village in the city Malabon, Metro Manila
- Longo's, Canadian supermarket chain in the Greater Toronto and Hamilton Area
- East Side Longos, Hispanic Gang
- Longos (Guimarães), a freguesia in Portugal

== See also ==
- Longo
- Longosaurus
