= Cannon to a Whisper =

Studio album by Breaking Pangaea
- Released: December 11, 2001
- Genre: Indie rock
- Length: 47:07
- Label: Undecided

Breaking Pangaea chronology
Take Apart the Words (2000)	Cannon to a Whisper (2001)	Phoenix (2003)

Professional ratings
Review scores
Source	Rating
AllMusic	4/5 stars

Cannon to a Whisper is the only studio album by Philadelphia-emo/indie rock band Breaking Pangaea. It was released in 2001 on Undecided Records. The first pre-chorus of "Wedding Dress" was later re-used as the chorus of "My Blue Heaven" in Fred Mascherino's later band, Taking Back Sunday.

== Track listing ==
1. "Sick Day"—5:41
2. "Wedding Dress"—3:26
3. "Suspended"—5:04
4. "Skylight"—4:17
5. "For a Word"—2:09
6. "The New Sound"—2:59
7. "...And Still They Hated It"—5:09
8. "Part"—2:00
9. "Walrus"—4:46
10. "Turning"—11:36

== Personnel ==
- Fred Mascherino—guitar, vocals
- Clint Stelfox—bass
- Will Noon—drums
