= Roberto Longo =

Roberto Longo may refer to:

- Roberto Longo (cyclist) (born 1984), Italian cyclist
- Roberto Longo (mathematician) (born 1953), Italian mathematician
