= 2007 Tour de Pologne =

Cycling race

The 2007 Tour de Pologne was held from September 9 to 15, 2007 in Poland. The race began with a very short team time trial in the streets of Warsaw, and its toughest stages were in the proximity of Jelenia Góra, as usual. In all, the race comprised seven stages.

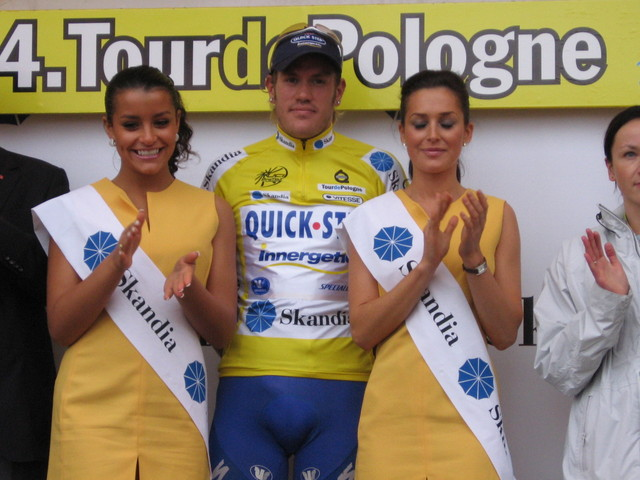
Wouter Weylandt wearing the yellow jersey in Gdańsk

== Jersey progress chart ==
Stage (Winner)	General Classification Yellow Jersey	Mountains Classification Green Jersey	Points Classification Navy Blue Jersey	Intermediate Sprints Classification Red Jersey	Team Classification
Stage 1 (TTT) (Lampre–Fondital)	Roberto Longo	no award	no award	no award	Lampre–Fondital
Stage 2 (Graeme Brown)	Graeme Brown	no award	Graeme Brown	Łukasz Bodnar	Gerolsteiner
Stage 3 (David Kopp)	Wouter Weylandt	Nicolas Rousseau	David Kopp	Łukasz Bodnar	Gerolsteiner
Stage 4 (Danilo Napolitano)	Danilo Napolitano	Murilo Antonio Fischer	José Joaquín Rojas Gil	Łukasz Bodnar	Gerolsteiner
Stage 5 (Murilo Antonio Fischer)	Danilo Napolitano	Murilo Antonio Fischer	Danilo Napolitano	Łukasz Bodnar	Lampre–Fondital
Stage 6 (Filippo Pozzato)	Murilo Antonio Fischer	Yoann Le Boulanger	José Joaquín Rojas Gil	Łukasz Bodnar	Gerolsteiner
Stage 7 (Johan Van Summeren)	Johan Van Summeren	Yoann Le Boulanger	José Joaquín Rojas Gil	Łukasz Bodnar	Team CSC

== Stages ==
=== Stage 1 – September 9, 2007: Warsaw, 3 km. (TTT) ===
Stage 1 result

	Team	Nation	Time
1	Lampre–Fondital	Italy	3' 36"
2	T-Mobile Team	Germany	+ 2"
3	Astana Team	Kazakhstan	+ 8"
4	Bouygues Télécom	France	+ 10"
5	Unibet.com Cycling Team	Sweden	+ 10"

General Classification after Stage 1 (Żółta koszulka)

	Cyclist	Nation	Team	Time
1	Roberto Longo	Italy	LAM	3' 36"
2	Fabio Baldato	Italy	LAM	s.t.
3	Daniele Righi	Italy	LAM	s.t.
4	Alessandro Ballan	Italy	LAM	s.t.
5	Danilo Napolitano	Italy	LAM	s.t.

- The race jury ultimately decided that the severe conditions of the weather were unfair, and decided to award Lampre's Fabio Baldato with the leader's jersey but have all riders at the same time in the overall classification.

=== Stage 2 – September 10, 2007: Płońsk > Olsztyn, 203.6 km. ===
Stage 2 result

	Cyclist	Nation	Team	Time
1	Graeme Brown	Australia	RAB	4h 50' 46"
2	Wouter Weylandt	Belgium	QSI	s.t.
3	Saïd Haddou	France	BTL	s.t.
4	David Kopp	Germany	GST	s.t.
5	José Joaquín Rojas Gil	Spain	GCE	s.t.

General Classification after Stage 2 (Żółta koszulka):

	Cyclist	Nation	Team	Time
1	Graeme Brown	Australia	RAB	4h 50' 36"
2	Wouter Weylandt	Belgium	QSI	+ 3"
3	Saïd Haddou	France	BTL	+ 6"
4	Danilo Napolitano	Italy	LAM	+ 6"
5	Fabian Wegmann	Germany	GST	+ 8"

=== Stage 3 – September 11, 2007: Ostróda > Gdańsk, 192.3 km. ===
Stage 3 result

	Cyclist	Nation	Team	Time
1	David Kopp	Germany	GST	4h 45' 22"
2	José Joaquín Rojas Gil	Spain	GCE	s.t.
3	Wouter Weylandt	Belgium	QST	s.t.
4	Danilo Napolitano	Italy	LAM	s.t.
5	Maxim Iglinsky	Kazakhstan	AST	s.t.

General Classification after Stage 3 (Żółta koszulka):

	Cyclist	Nation	Team	Time
1	Wouter Weylandt	Belgium	QST	9h 35' 57"
2	David Kopp	Germany	GST	+ 1"
3	Graeme Brown	Australia	RAB	+ 1"
4	Nicolas Rousseau	France	A2R	+ 4"
5	José Joaquín Rojas Gil	Spain	GCE	+ 5"

=== Stage 4 – September 12, 2007: Chojnice > Poznań, 242.3 km. ===
Stage 4 result

	Cyclist	Nation	Team	Time
1	Danilo Napolitano	Italy	LAM	5h 47' 03"
2	Tomas Vaitkus	Lithuania	DSC	s.t.
3	Robert Förster	Germany	GST	s.t.
4	Mirco Lorenzetto	Italy	MRM	s.t.
5	José Joaquín Rojas Gil	Spain	GCE	s.t.

General Classification after Stage 4 (Żółta koszulka):

	Cyclist	Nation	Team	Time
1	Danilo Napolitano	Italy	LAM	15h 22' 57"
2	Wouter Weylandt	Belgium	QSI	+ 2"
3	Graeme Brown	Australia	RAB	+ 4"
4	David Kopp	Germany	GST	+ 4"
5	Murilo Antonio Fischer	Brazil	LIQ	+ 5"

=== Stage 5 – September 13, 2007: Września > Świdnica, 264.5 km. ===
Stage 5 result

	Cyclist	Nation	Team	Time
1	Murilo Antonio Fischer	Brazil	LIQ	6h 44' 24"
2	Danilo Napolitano	Italy	LAM	s.t.
3	Wouter Weylandt	Belgium	QST	s.t.
4	Mikhaylo Khalilov	Ukraine	FLM	s.t.
5	Koen de Kort	Netherlands	AST	s.t.

General Classification after Stage 5 (Żółta koszulka):

	Cyclist	Nation	Team	Time
1	Danilo Napolitano	Italy	LAM	22h 07' 15"
2	Murilo Antonio Fischer	Brazil	LIQ	+ 1"
3	Wouter Weylandt	Belgium	QST	+ 4"
4	José Joaquín Rojas Gil	Spain	GCE	+ 14"
5	David Kopp	Germany	GST	+ 16"

=== Stage 6 – September 14, 2007: Dzierżoniów > Jelenia Góra, 183.7 km. ===
Stage 6 result

	Cyclist	Nation	Team	Time
1	Filippo Pozzato	Italy	LIQ	4h 47' 48"
2	José Joaquín Rojas Gil	Spain	GCE	s.t.
3	Marcus Burghardt	Germany	TMO	s.t.
4	David Kopp	Germany	GST	s.t.
5	Mikhaylo Khalilov	Ukraine	FLM	s.t.

General Classification after Stage 6 (Żółta koszulka):

	Cyclist	Nation	Team	Time
1	Murilo Antonio Fischer	Brazil	LIQ	26h 55' 04"
2	José Joaquín Rojas Gil	Spain	GCE	+ 7"
3	David Kopp	Germany	GST	+ 9"
4	Filippo Pozzato	Italy	LIQ	+ 9"
5	Fabian Wegmann	Germany	GST	+ 15"

=== Stage 7 – September 15, 2007: Jelenia Góra > Karpacz, 147.7 km. ===
Stage 7 result

	Cyclist	Nation	Team	Time
1	Johan Vansummeren	Belgium	PRL	3h 56' 58"
2	Robert Gesink	Netherlands	RAB	+ 23"
3	Kim Kirchen	Luxembourg	TMO	+ 32"
4	Danilo Di Luca	Italy	LIQ	+ 34"
5	Alessandro Ballan	Italy	LAM	+ 34"

General Classification after Stage 7 (Żółta koszulka):

	Cyclist	Nation	Team	Time
1	Johan Van Summeren	Belgium	PRL	30h 52' 11"
2	Robert Gesink	Netherlands	RAB	+ 27"
3	Kim Kirchen	Luxembourg	TMO	+ 38"
4	Fabian Wegmann	Germany	GST	+ 39"
5	Alessandro Ballan	Italy	LAM	+ 44"

== General Standings ==
	Cyclist	Nation	Team	Time	UCI Points
1	Johan Vansummeren	Belgium	PRL	30h 52' 11"	50
2	Robert Gesink	Netherlands	RAB	+ 27"	40
3	Kim Kirchen	Luxembourg	TMO	+ 38"	35
4	Fabian Wegmann	Germany	GST	+ 39"	30
5	Alessandro Ballan	Italy	LAM	+ 44"	25
6	Pablo Lastras Garcia	Spain	GCE	+ 44"	20
7	Fränk Schleck	Luxembourg	CSC	+ 44"	15
8	Danilo Di Luca	Italy	LIQ	+ 44"	10
9	José Joaquín Rojas Gil	Spain	GCE	+ 47"	5
10	Thomas Voeckler	France	BTL	+ 52"	2

== KOM Classification ==
	Cyclist	Nation	Team	Points
1	Yoann Le Boulanger	France	BTL	61
2	Marzio Bruseghin	Italy	LAM	50
3	Marco Pinotti	Italy	TMO	31

== Points Classification ==
	Cyclist	Nation	Team	Points
1	José Joaquín Rojas Gil	Spain	GCE	91
2	Mikhaylo Khalilov	Ukraine	FLM	42
3	Murilo Antonio Fischer	Brazil	LIQ	40

== Best Team ==
	Team	Country	Time
1	Team CSC	Denmark	92h 39' 12"
2	Caisse d'Epargne	Spain	+ 23"
3	Rabobank	Netherlands	+ 1' 28"
