= Judgement Day (band) =

American string metal band

- Origin: Oakland, California, United States
- Genres: Cello metal, classical, progressive rock, East Bay punk
- Years active: 2002–2012
- Label: Independent
- Members: Anton Patzner - Violin; Lewis Patzner - Cello; Jon Bush - Drums
- Website: Official site

Judgement Day was an American three piece string metal band from Oakland, California.

== History ==
=== Beginnings (2002–2007) ===
Brothers Anton and Lewis Patzner started off playing metal violin and cello duets on the streets in Berkeley, California in 2002. They quickly released a seven-song acoustic EP and began playing rock shows as Judgement Day. The CD was self-recorded and about 500 copies were made and sold at shows and on the street. It is now out of print.

Shortly after the release of that disc the brothers recruited their friend Jon Bush to play drums and began playing fully amplified shows in Santa Cruz and Oakland with bands like The Botticellis, Minkus, Desa and The Matches. Many of these early shows, while well received, were plagued with sound problems, mostly because of the feedback that comes from amplifying and distorting acoustic instruments. Eventually the band refined their techniques, bought the right kind of gear and figured out how to make their sound work on stage.

In November 2004, Judgement Day released their debut album, Dark Opus. The record immediately gained praise in local and online press. Entirely self recorded and released, the half-hour album includes mostly tracks of heavy metal and hardcore with drums and distorted violin and cello but also includes some slower interlude tracks with string orchestras. One metal song features a full choir.

Unfortunately, soon after the release of "Dark Opus" Judgement Day was put on hold as Lewis Patzner began to concentrate heavily on receiving his cello performance degree from The Peabody Conservatory of Music in Baltimore. Adding to the hiatus, Anton Patzner was recruited to play violin for notable indie-rock band Bright Eyes after Judgement Day was discovered playing an acoustic set outside of The Great American Music Hall in San Francisco by Cursive. For the next three years, Judgement Day released no new recordings and only played a few scattered shows. They did manage to play their first tour in May 2006, which included dates in Los Angeles, San Diego and Santa Barbara in addition to Northern California.

Also in 2006, the band joined MySpace and started a YouTube channel, posting live footage of street performances, club shows and webcasts as well as music videos and a promotional video called "December 29th is Judgement Day" which became a minor hit with over 30,000 views.

=== 2008–2009 ===
Lewis Patzner graduated from Conservatory in spring of 2007 and the brothers both moved back to the bay area to begin work on another album. On May 9, 2008, Judgement Day released a 6-song EP title Opus 3: Acoustic. In August 2008 they began touring nationally, supporting headlining acts such as Dredg, Mates of State, and Margot and the Nuclear So and So's. Judgement Day first played at Pittsburgh punk venue Mousetrap Manor on October 21, 2008. On July 21, 2009, Judgement Day released a 7" record entitled "Out of the Abyss: Live on Tape" on Third Culture Records.

=== 2010–2012 ===
Judgement Day has released their second album entitled Peacocks / Pink Monsters. According to their blog they recorded drums at Nu-Tone Studios with engineer Riki Feldmann in Pittsburg, California and finished overdubs at Anton's home studio. Peacocks / Pink Monsters was released independently on April 13, 2010.

They are no longer active.

== Members ==
- Anton Patzner - Violin
- Lewis Patzner - Cello
- Jon Bush - Drums

== Discography ==
=== Albums ===
- 2003 - Acoustic EP (out of print)
- 2004 - Dark Opus
- 2008 - Opus 3: Acoustic
- 2009 - "Out of the Abyss: Live on Tape" (7" single)
- 2010 - Peacocks" / Pink Monsters
- 2010 - B•Sides
- 2012 - Polar Shift

=== Compilation albums ===
- 2005 - The NorCal Compilation (2005), song: "Noae Kaedae"

=== Guest appearances ===
- 2006 - Taking Back Sunday - Louder Now, song: "My Blue Heaven"
- 2006 - The Matches - Decomposer, song: "Salty Eyes"
- 2007 - The Color Fred - Bend To Break, songs: "It Isn't Me"; "I'll Never Know"
- 2009 - Pete Yorn - Back and Fourth
- 2009 - dredg - The Pariah, the Parrot, the Delusion, song: "Long Days And Vague Clues"
- 2010 - Slash - Slash
- 2010 - Taking Back Sunday - Live from Orensanz CD/DVD
- 2011 - The Low Anthem - Smart Flesh
- 2011 - Jack Conte - VS4
