= All Hail the Dead =

Studio album by Walls of Jericho
- Released: February 24, 2004
- Recorded: September 2003
- Studio: Cloud City (Redford)
- Genre: Metalcore
- Length: 35:03
- Label: Trustkill
- Producer: Mike Hasty

Walls of Jericho chronology
The Bound Feed the Gagged (1999)	All Hail the Dead (2004)	With Devils Amongst Us All (2006)

Professional ratings
Review scores
Source	Rating
AllMusic	3/5 stars
Collector's Guide to Heavy Metal	6/10
laut.de	3/5 stars
Metal Rules	4/5
Rock Hard	7.5/10

All Hail the Dead is the second studio album by American metalcore band Walls of Jericho, released on February 24, 2004, through Trustkill Records. It was the band's first album in five years, and only release with drummer Alexei Rodriguez.

== Track listing ==
All tracks are written by Walls of Jericho.

All Hail the Dead track listing
No.	Title	Length
1.	"All Hail the Dead"	3:16
2.	"There's No I in Fuck You"	2:40
3.	"A Little Piece of Me"	2:30
4.	"Another Anthem for the Hopeless"	2:15
5.	"Revival Never Goes Out of Style"	2:12
6.	"Day and a Thousand Years"	1:42
7.	"Through the Eyes of a Dreamer"	2:38
8.	"1:43 AM"	4:35
9.	"Jaded"	2:17
10.	"Thanks for the Memories"	2:52
11.	"More Life in the Monitors"	1:15
12.	"Fixing Broken Hearts"	2:37
13.	"To Be Continued..."	3:48
Total length:		35:03

== Personnel ==
Personnel per liner notes.

Walls of Jericho

- Candace Kucsulain – lead vocals
- Mike Hasty – lead guitar
- Chris Rawson – rhythm guitar
- Aaron Ruby – bass, backing vocals
- Alexei Rodriguez – drums

Production

- Mike Hasty – production, mixing, engineering
- Ryan "Bart" Williams – engineering
- Tom Hutten – mastering (at Bionic Mastering)

Artwork

- Mike Price – artwork
- Josh Grabelle – layout and design
- John McKaig – group photo
