= Walls of Jericho (band) =

American metalcore band

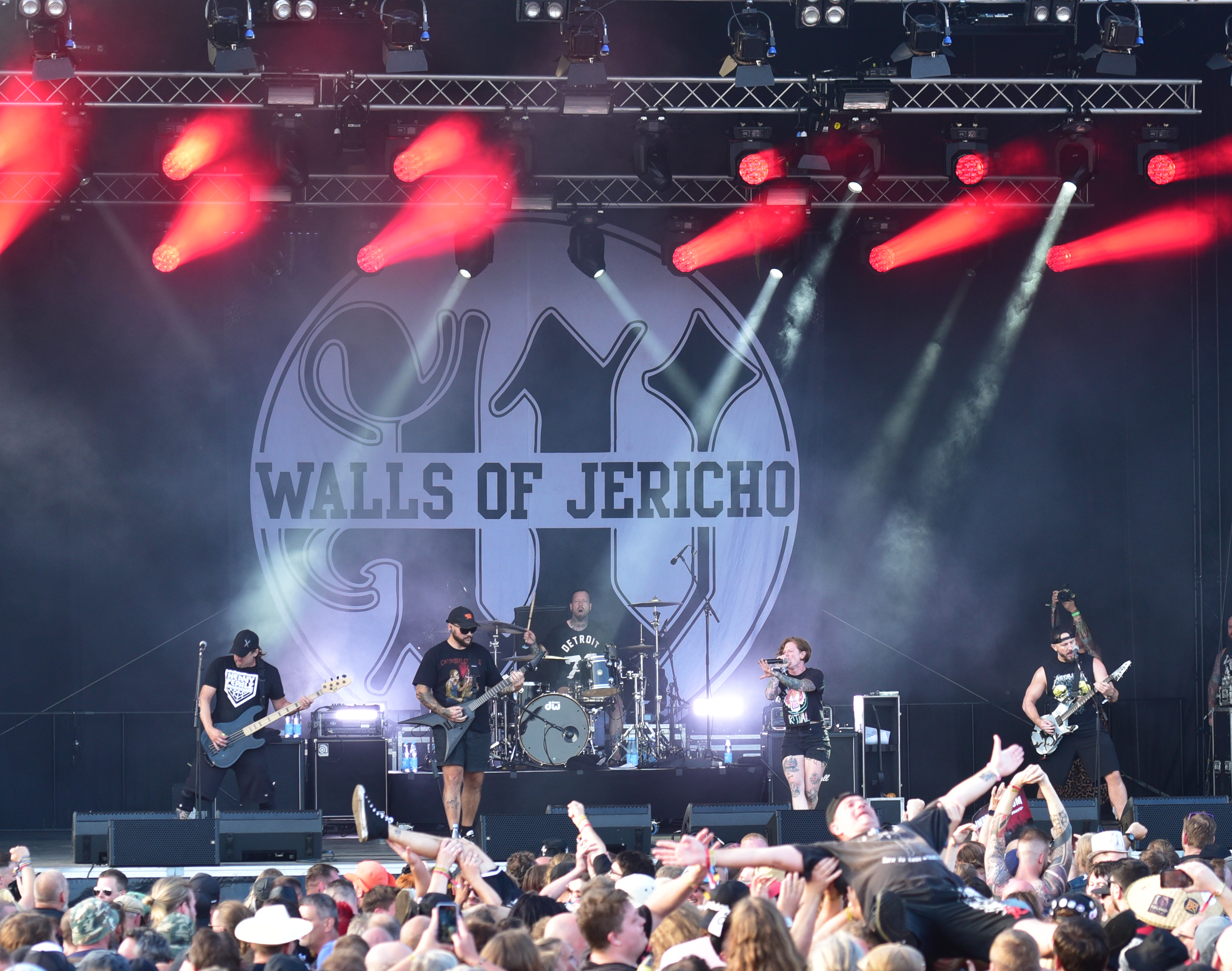
- Walls of Jericho at Reload Festival 2024

Background information
- Origin: Detroit, Michigan
- Genres: Metalcore; hardcore punk; thrash metal
- Years active: 1998–2001; 2003–present
- Labels: Eulogy; Genet; Napalm; Stick to the Core; Trustkill; Undecided
- Members: Candace Kucsulain; Aaron Ruby; Dustin Schoenhofer; Bobby VaLeu; Kyle Gailey
- Past members: Chris Rawson; Chris Towning; Mike Hasty; Wes Keely; Derek Grant; Alexei Rodriguez
- Website: Official Facebook

Walls of Jericho is an American metalcore band from Detroit, formed in 1998.

== History ==
Candace Kucsulain, Apathemy's singer from 1996 to 1998, joined the band when it was founded.

In April 1999 the band released their first EP, Underestimated, which was followed by a second EP, A Day and a Thousand Years, containing Underestimated and demo tracks, released on Florida-based Eulogy Recordings and later by European imprint Genet Records. After touring in support of the releases, the band was signed to Trustkill Records and released their debut full-length album The Bound Feed the Gagged in December 1999 (Genet Records also released the European version).

In 2000, it was announced that Walls of Jericho would be taking part of the Metallica tribute series Crush 'Em All for Undecided Records. Walls of Jericho was scheduled to share a split 7-inch vinyl with Indecision and recorded a cover of the song "Disposable Heroes". The split was delayed and eventually shelved, but Undecided Records included Walls of Jericho's recording on the various artists compilation The Old, The New, The Unreleased, released in January 2005.

After unsuccessful auditions to fill the vacant drummer position, the band went into hiatus. Shortly before this, lead vocalist Kucsulain entered a body piercing apprenticeship, which would occupy her free time over the next two years. Also during this time band members Hasty, Ruby and Rawson started a side project band called It's All Gone to Hell.

Alexei Rodriguez, former drummer of Catharsis, joined the band, which began touring again April 2003. The band began writing new material and, in September 2003, completed the recording of their full-length album All Hail the Dead. The band immediately embarked on a European tour with Richard Thurston filling in on guitar from October to December 2003. All Hail the Dead was released in February 2004; the release garnered them support slots for other bands as well as headlining tours of their own. It was not long after the release that Rodriguez left the band. He was replaced by longtime friend Dustin Schoenhofer.

They entered the studio in 2006 with producer Ben Schigel to start recording their third album, With Devils Amongst Us All, which was released in August. "A Trigger Full of Promises" was released as a its first single in April and was included on the MTV2 Headbangers Ball: The Revenge compilation CD.

In October 2007 the band worked with Corey Taylor to produce Redemption, an acoustic-only EP which was released on April 29, 2008, via Trustkill. Taylor providing guest vocals on three of the five tracks. On July 29, 2008, the band released their fourth full-length studio album, The American Dream, that features a return to the band's previous style, and was produced once again by Ben Schigel. In early 2014, they released "Relentless" as a demo. They released No One Can Save You From Yourself on March 25, 2016, via Napalm Records.

Drummer Dustin Schoenhofer was arrested in 2019 for allegedly transporting 632 pounds of marijuana. Walls of Jericho has played sporadic shows since, including appearances at the 2021 and 2023 Furnace Fest events.

Walls of Jericho's sixth studio album, and first in 10 years, System Error: Humanity is due for release on November 13, 2026.

== Sound and influences ==
AllMusic wrote that Walls of Jericho's sound is "balanced old-school hardcore, thrash metal, and 'chugga-chugga' metalcore with a ferocity and dedication unmatched by many of their contemporaries." Walls of Jericho cite influences ranging from hardcore punk bands like Minor Threat and Earth Crisis to metal heavyweights such as Metallica, Slayer, and Sepultura, while vocalist Candace Kucsulain also drew early inspiration from punk, grindcore, and even artists like Hole and the Beastie Boys.

== Members ==
Walls of Jericho, band members at Rockharz 2026

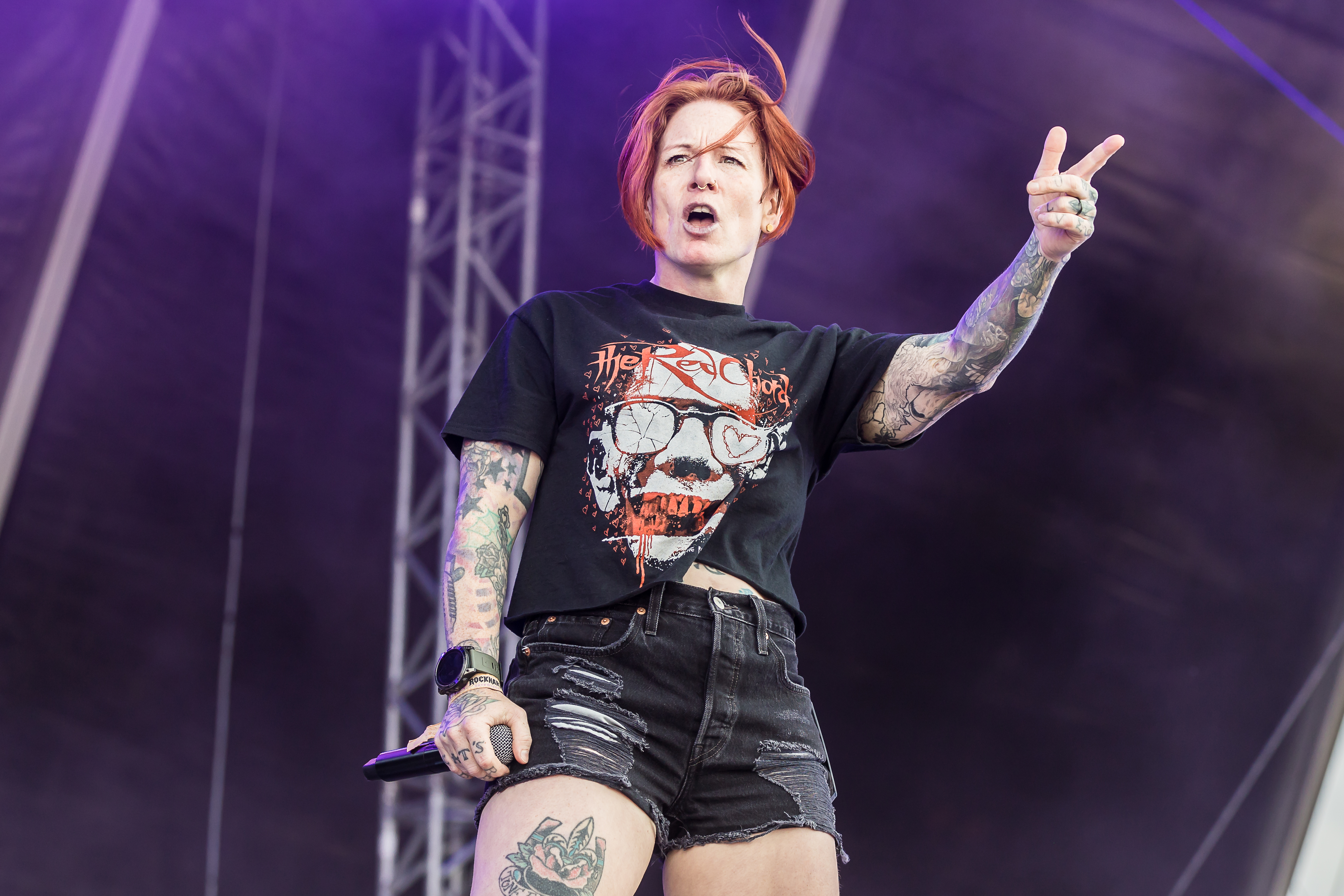
Candace Ryan Kucsulain, vocals

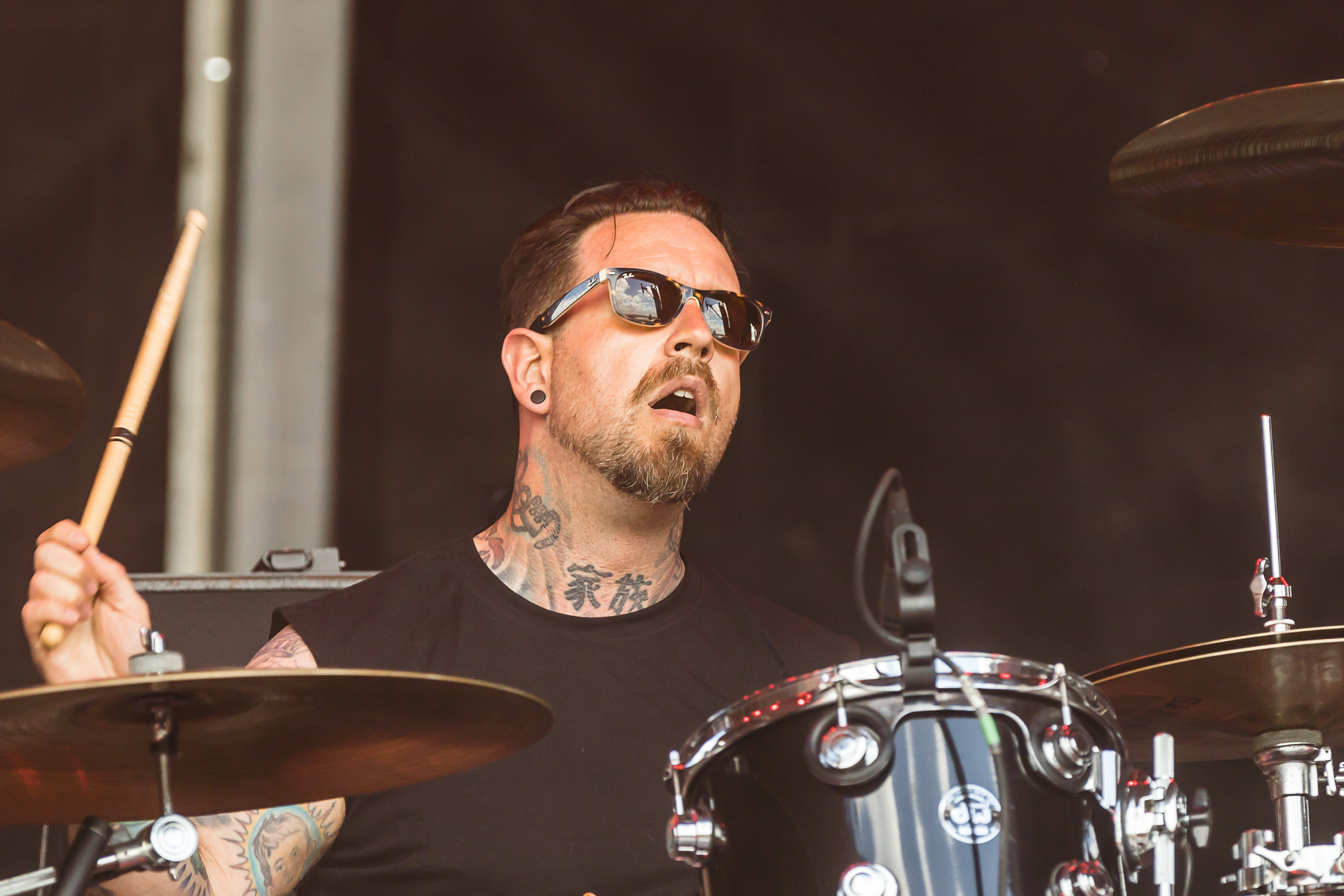
Dustin Schoenhofer, drums

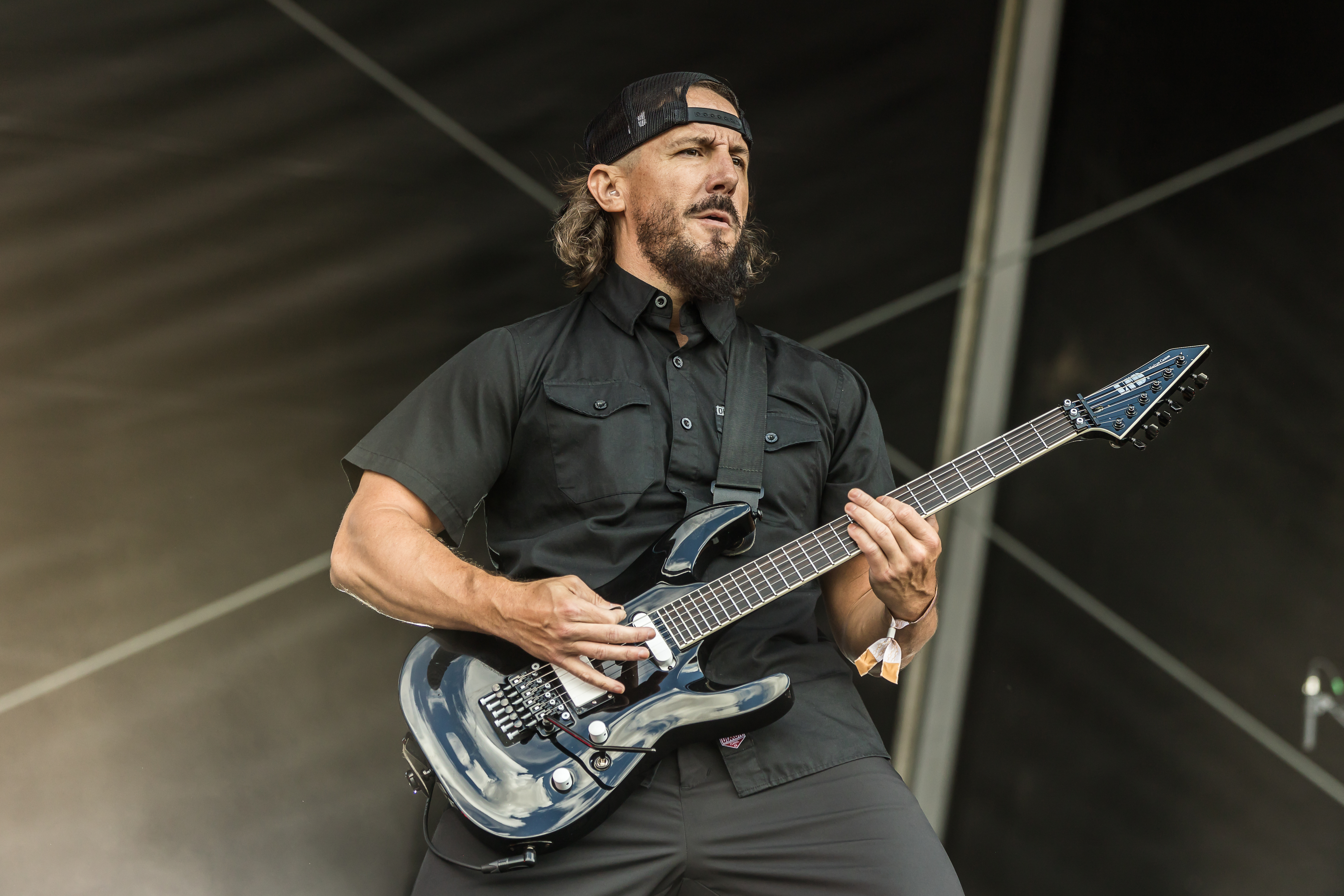
Bobby VaLeu, lead guitar

Current

- Candace Kucsulain – lead vocals (1998–2001, 2003–present)
- Aaron Ruby – bass, backing vocals (1998–2001, 2003–present)
- Dustin Schoenhofer – drums (2004–present)
- Bobby VaLeu – lead guitar (2016–present)
- Kyle Gailey – rhythm guitar (2024–present)

Former

- Chris Rawson – lead guitar (1998–2001, 2003–2016; sporadic appearances thereafter)
- Mike Hasty – rhythm guitar (1998–2001, 2003–2019)
- Wes Keely – drums (1998–2001)
- Derek Grant – drums (2001)
- Alexei Rodriguez – drums (2003–2004)
- Chris Towning – rhythm guitar (2019–2024)

Former touring musicians

- Richard Thurston – lead guitar (2003)

== Discography ==
=== Studio albums ===
List of studio albums, with selected details
Title	EP details	US Heat.	US Ind.	GER
The Bound Feed the Gagged	Released: February 22, 2000; Label: Trustkill; Format: CD, LP, DD	—	—	—
All Hail the Dead	Released: February 24, 2004; Label: Trustkilll; Format: CD, DD	—	—	—
With Devils Amongst Us All	Released: August 22, 2006; Label: Trustkill; Format: CD, LP, DD	24	31	—
The American Dream	Released: July 29, 2008; Label: Trustkill; Format: CD, LP, DD	11	—	—
No One Can Save You from Yourself	Released: March 25, 2016; Label: Napalm; Format: CD, LP, DD	18	—	60
System Error: Humanity	Released: November 13, 2026; Label: Napalm; Format: CD, LP, DD	To be released		
"—" denotes a recording that did not chart or was not released in that territory. "x" denotes a chart that did not exist when the song was charting, either from not being launched yet or being discontinued.

=== EPs ===
List of EPs, with selected details
Title	EP details	US Heat.
A Day and a Thousand Years	Released: April 1999; Label: Underestimated; Format: CD, 7"	—
From Hell	Released: July 15, 2006; Label: Trustkill; Format: CD	—
Redemption	Released: April 29, 2008; Label: Trustkill; Format: CD	49
"—" denotes a recording that did not chart or was not released in that territory
