= Luongo =

Luongo is an Italian surname. Notable people with the surname include:

- Alfred Leopold Luongo (1920–1986), United States federal judge
- Chris Luongo (born 1967), American former ice hockey player for the Detroit Red Wings
- David Luongo (born 1988), French professional footballer
- Gerald Luongo (born 1938), American Republican Party politician
- Massimo Luongo (born 1992), Australian professional soccer player
- Pino Luongo (born 1952/1953), American-based Italian restaurateur, businessman, and memoirist
- Roberto Luongo (born 1979), Canadian former ice hockey goaltender
- Stefano Luongo (born 1990), Italian water polo player
- Steve Luongo (born 1952), American drummer

== See also ==
- Longo, a surname
- Lungo, a type of coffee beverage prepared by making espresso with much more water
- Luongo (constituency), a constituency in Zambia
