= The American Dream (Walls of Jericho album) =

Studio album by Walls of Jericho
- Released: July 29, 2008
- Recorded: 2008
- Genres: Metalcore; hardcore punk; grindcore
- Length: 35:47
- Label: Trustkill
- Producers: Ben Schiegel, Tony Gammalo

Walls of Jericho chronology
With Devils Amongst Us All (2006)	The American Dream (2008)	No One Can Save You from Yourself (2016)

Professional ratings
Review scores
Source	Rating
Helldriver Magazine	5/7
Metal.de	7/10
MetalSucks	2/5
Ox-Fanzine	8/10
PopMatters	5/10
Rock Hard	8/10
Ultimate Guitar	8/10

The American Dream is the fourth studio album by American metalcore band Walls of Jericho, released on July 29, 2008, by Trustkill Records. The album received generally positive reviews from critics. To promote the album, Walls of Jericho embarked on extensive international supporting tours, including the Rock Star Mayhem Tour with Slipknot, Disturbed, and DragonForce.

== Track listing ==
All tracks are written by Walls of Jericho.

No.	Title	Length
1.	"The New Ministry"	2:41
2.	"II. the Prey"	2:39
3.	"The American Dream"	3:14
4.	"Feeding Frenzy"	3:53
5.	"I. the Hunter"	2:13
6.	"Famous Last Words"	1:45
7.	"A Long Walk Home"	3:16
8.	"III. Shock of the Century"	2:43
9.	"Discovery of Jones"	4:14
10.	"Standing on Paper Stilts"	2:32
11.	"Night of a Thousand Torches"	2:59
12.	"The Slaughter Begins"	3:38
Total length:		35:47

== Personnel ==
- Candace Kucsulain – lead vocals
- Mike Hasty – lead guitar
- Chris Rawson – rhythm guitar
- Aaron Ruby – bass guitar
- Dustin Schoenhofer – drums

Production

- Ben Schiegel – production, engineering, mixing
- Tony Gammalo – production, engineering
- Casey Quintal – design, art direction
