= No One Can Save You from Yourself =

Studio album by Walls of Jericho
- Released: March 25, 2016
- Recorded: 2014–2015
- Genres: Metalcore; hardcore punk
- Length: 40:53
- Label: Napalm

Walls of Jericho chronology
The American Dream (2008)	No One Can Save You from Yourself (2016)	System Error: Humanity (2026)

Professional ratings
Review scores
Source	Rating
Distorted Sound	9/10
Metal Hammer	4/5 stars
Metal Injection	7.5/10
Metal.de	8/10
New Noise Magazine	4/5 stars
Ox-Fanzine	4.5/5 stars
Rock Hard	8/10
Ultimate Guitar	6/10

No One Can Save You from Yourself is the fifth studio album by American metalcore band Walls of Jericho, released on March 25, 2016, by Napalm Records. The song "Relentless" was released as a demo on February 21, 2014, and then released as a single on February 11, 2016. Vocalist Candace Kucsulain has explained the meaning of the album title, "We are our worst enemy, we are the reason for the destruction that is happening in the world. We believe there is too much empathy in this world, it is a time for a change, people need to understand that If we can want to change this world, we have to start doing it by changing staff that we do. No one can do it for you but you!"

== Track listing ==
All tracks are written by Walls of Jericho.

No.	Title	Length
1.	"Intro"	1:26
2.	"Illusion of Safety"	1:39
3.	"No One Can Save You From Yourself"	3:31
4.	"Forever Militant"	3:27
5.	"Fight the Good Fight"	3:35
6.	"Cutbird"	3:38
7.	"Relentless"	3:29
8.	"Damage Done"	3:04
9.	"Reign Supreme"	3:43
10.	"Wrapped in Violence"	3:21
11.	"Anthem"	3:32
12.	"Beyond All Praise"	2:59
13.	"Probably Will"	3:28
Total length:		40:52

== Personnel ==
- Candace Kucsulain – lead vocals
- Mike Hasty – lead guitar
- Chris Rawson – rhythm guitar
- Aaron Ruby – bass guitar
- Dustin Schoenhofer – drums
