= Tender Remains =

Single by Palm Springs

from the album No Hurt Like a Broken Heart
- B-side: "Fall Morning"
- Released: August 2004
- Length: 4:13
- Label: Random Acts of Vinyl
- Songwriter(s): Cane, Russo

Palm Springs singles chronology
"Tender Remains" (2004)	"Echo of Me" (2005)

"Tender Remains" is a song, included as the A-side of a 7" single and the first to be released by the British band Palm Springs on their Random Acts of Vinyl label.

Cane and Russo, Palm Springs' songwriting duo, have sited "Tender Remains" and "Fall Morning" as the first two songs that their collaboration produced. They were recorded with the help of London-based producer and singer-songwriter Kah, who also provided backing vocals on a large number of recordings.
