= With Devils Amongst Us All =

Studio album by Walls of Jericho
- Released: August 21, 2006
- Recorded: March 6 – April 4, 2006
- Studio: Spider (Cleveland)
- Genres: Metalcore; thrash metal
- Length: 35:01
- Label: Trustkill
- Producer: Ben Schiegel

Walls of Jericho chronology
All Hail the Dead (2004)	With Devils Amongst Us All (2006)	The American Dream (2008)

With Devils Amongst Us All is the third studio album by American metalcore band Walls of Jericho, released on August 21, 2006, by Trustkill Records. It was the band's first album with drummer Dustin Schoenhofer. In an effort to establish their own sound, the band worked with an outside producer for the first time, Ben Schiegel, during the album's recording at Spider Studios in Cleveland. Musically, the album blends elements of metalcore and thrash metal and emphasizes melodic qualities. Its lyrics are mainly focused on overcoming challenges, and also cover personal experiences and social issues.

With Devils Amongst Us All received generally positive reviews from critics and debuted at number 24 on the Billboard Heatseekers Albums Chart and number 31 on the Top Independent Albums Chart, with first week sales of 2,800 copies. To promote the album, Walls of Jericho filmed a music video for "A Trigger Full of Promises" which debuted on MTV2's Headbangers Ball, and embarked on extensive international supporting tours, including the Ozzfest and Family Values tours, throughout 2006 and 2007.

== Background and recording ==
After touring in support of their previous album All Hail the Dead (2004), Walls of Jericho spent four or five months writing With Devils Amongst Us All. Vocalist Candace Kucsulain said, that in contrast to All Hail the Dead, which was written and recorded within four months following their 2003 reformation, the band had more time to write, gathering ideas for the album for more than two years. Moreover, the band had a better understanding of each other and the kind of music they wanted to play. She also cited the addition of drummer Dustin Schoenhofer who joined in November 2004, as an influence on the band's new songs with his playing style. Aware they would be subject to more scrutiny following the success of their last album, more time was spent arranging material, an often arduous process that carried over into recording. According to guitarist Mike Hasty, the band structured their songs with the aim of "[shifting] things around" when they get into the studio, though in the end "not that much actually got changed".

On March 6, 2006, Walls of Jericho began recording the album with producer Ben Schiegel at Spider Studios in Cleveland. With Hasty having produced and recorded the band's previous albums, Walls of Jericho decided to use an outside producer who would stop them from "[writing] the same thing over and over again" and help establish their own sound; they were connected to Schiegel through their shared manager, Paul Bassman. In an interview with Alternative Press, Kucsulain said that Walls of Jericho did not want Schiegel to "be the kind of [producer] who would come in and try to take control over everything or try to write things or change our sound" and "made it very clear to him that we'd appreciate if he'd just put input where we asked him to, or if he saw something that needed to be changed". She praised his input for improving the band's dynamics and structures of their songs. The band finished recording on April 4, after which Hasty and Schoenhofer travelled to New Jersey to begin mixing the album with Eric Rachel, whilst Rawson and Kucsulain "finished up some vocal stuff". It was completed on April 24, 2006.

== Composition and lyrics ==
With Devils Amongst Us All has been described as metalcore and thrash metal. The album showcases a fast, heavy and aggressive sound and features precise drumming, hardcore breakdowns, and an emphasis on melodic qualities heard most prominently on "The Haunted" and "No Saving Me". The intensity and speed of several tracks drew frequent comparisons to Slayer. Its lyrics are based on personal experiences and address various social issues, whilst bearing a more positive and direct approach compared to Walls of Jericho's previous albums. According to Kucsulain, the album is "very much about overcoming obstacles and becoming the person you find deep inside yourself"; she said its title "represents evil in everyday life".

"A Trigger Full of Promises" is about finding the loved one, and overcoming barriers to be with them. According to Decibel, "I Know Hollywood and You Ain't It" showcases crust-punk interpreted "as a dance-y, layered stomp-fest". "And Hope To Die" is about the suicides of people who were friends with Walls of Jericho. "The Haunted" begins with "eerie, melancholic chanting" and features a melodic chorus; its lyrics are about raising awareness of rape. Kucsulain found the song "weird" due to its catchiness, but believed that "if you want people to listen to the message, you have to sugarcoat the package". "No Saving Me" is a power ballad, similar to earlier Walls of Jericho songs "Angel" and "To Be Continued...", about feeling "totally alienated from the real world" on tour. (Note: "No Saving Me": For genre, see: For similarities, see: For subject matter, see:) It was the first song on the album with completed instrumental track, but the last to have its vocals recorded. "Welcome Home" is about domestic violence.

== Release and promotion ==
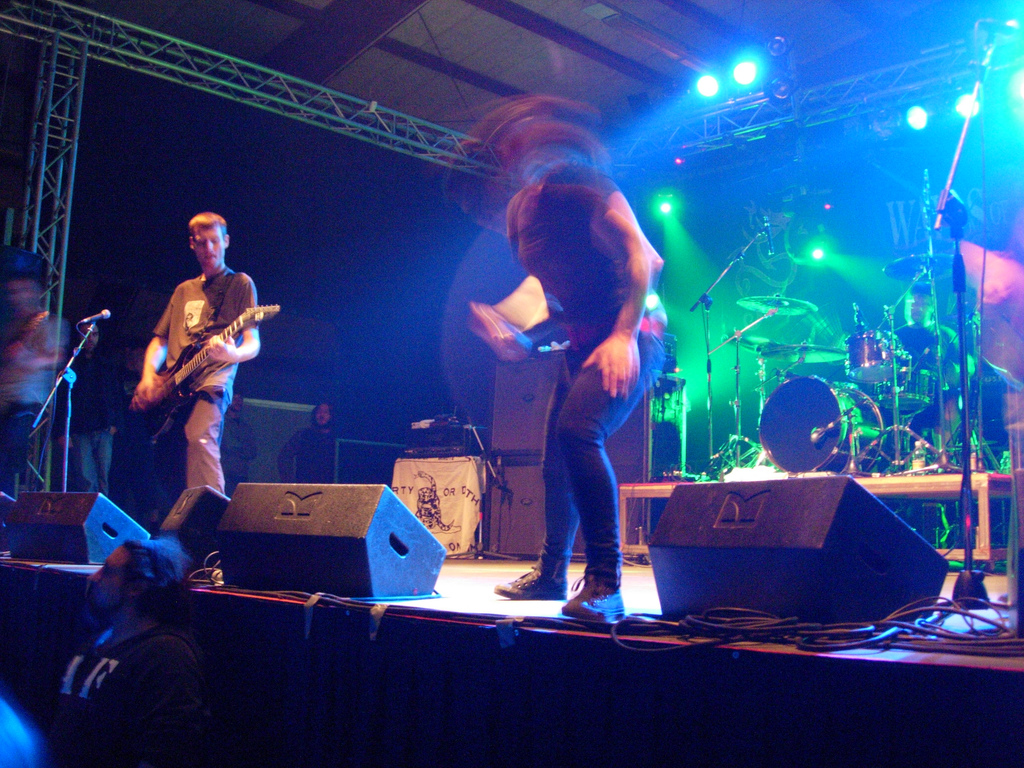
Walls of Jericho performing in Italy in 2006

From May 12 to May 28, 2006, Walls of Jericho toured the United States and Canada as part of Trustkill Records' Trustkill Takeover package tour, headlined by Bullet for My Valentine. In early June 2006, the band filmed a music video for "A Trigger Full of Promises", which Kucsulain described as the band's "first real video", inside an old farmhouse in Pennsylvania. Directed by Dale Restigini and scripted by Dustin Schoenhofer, (Note: Kucsulain: "[Schoenhofer] had the [video] idea and everybody started to collaborate with that idea. [...] After this he wrote a great part of the script with everybody looking over his shoulder. Yeah you could say he wrote the script but we agreed with it.") the video reflects the song's lyrics. Schoenhofer said that the idea behind the video was to "combine a Romeo and Juliet storyline" with the video for "The Unforgiven" by Metallica. The song was included on the compilation album MTV2 Headbanger's Ball: The Revenge (2006), released through Roadrunner Records, and its video debuted on MTV2's Headbangers Ball on September 30, 2006. From June 16 to June 26, 2006, Walls of Jericho joined a short Canadian tour headlined by Unearth. On June 27, the band announced the release of With Devils Amongst Us All and unveiled its tracklist. The album was released in Europe on August 21, 2006, and in the United States the day after. It sold 2,800 copies in its first week of release to debut at number 24 on the Billboard Heatseekers Albums Chart and number 31 on the Top Independent Albums Chart.

From July 1 to August 13, 2006, Walls of Jericho performed on the second stage of the Ozzfest Tour, before joining the Family Values Tour 2006 from August 18 to September 20, 2006. In October, the band returned to Canada to play a shows with Bleeding Through and August Burns Red, before playing their first-ever South American shows in Brazil. From November 1 to November 12, 2006, Walls of Jericho embarked on a headlining tour of the United Kingdom with Seventh Cross. From November 30 to December 10, 2006, the band joined the Persistence Tour across Europe with Madball, Sick of It All, Terror, Comeback Kid, Destiny and the Distance. Between February and May 2007, Walls of Jericho supported Kittie on their Funeral for Yesterday Tour across North America, alongside 36 Crazyfists, Dead to Fall and In This Moment. After the Kittie tour, the band toured Japan for the first time supporting Stone Sour. Walls of Jericho returned to Europe to support Born From Pain from September 13 to October 7, 2007, alongside All Shall Perish, Fear My Thoughts, and From A Second Story Window.

== Critical reception ==
Professional ratings
Review scores
Source	Rating
Alternative Press	5/5
Drowned in Sound	7/10
Kerrang!	4/5 stars
laut.de	4/5 stars
Metal.de	7/10
Metal Hammer	8/10
Ox-Fanzine	9/10
PopMatters	7/10
Rock Hard	8.5/10
Rock Sound	7/10

With Devils Amongst Us All received generally positive reviews from critics. Con Hongos of Alternative Press believed the album showed Walls of Jericho had reached "the height of their powers [...], and are completely worthy of the world's attention." Jan Jaedike of Rock Hard praised the album as "a breathtakingly masterful mix of ferocity, attention to detail, and catchiness" and felt it "easily established [the band] in the extremist champions league". Jeanne Fury of Decibel considered it the band's "most robust album to date". Kerrang! felt the album represented "brutal hardcore the way it's meant to be" whilst comparing Kucsulain's "authoritative" vocals favorably to Jamey Jasta of Hatebreed. Ox-Fanzine's Tobias Ernst and laut.de's Michael Edele both considered the album superior to All Hail the Dead, with the former praising it as "more well-rounded and the consistently high level" and the latter highlighting Kucsulain's improved delivery. Punk Planet reviewer Chay Lawrence was less favorable, praising the album's production and performances but considering its songwriting formularic. Though acknowledging that the album was "not groundbreaking", Adrien Begrand of PopMatters felt that its overall "convincing, sincere approach" made it "likeable enough to warrant an enthusiastic recommendation over the usual crop of cookie-cutter [metal] bands".

The song "No Saving Me", according to AllSchools, "seemed to be a bit controversial" among music reviewers. Alternative Press and Kerrang! called the song the album's only bad track; the latter felt its inclusion was "superfluous" when considering the "impressive carnage surrounding it". Mike Kemp of Rock Sound similarly found the song "so far out of character that it sticks out like a penguin in the Sahara." Raziq Rauf of Drowned in Sound was more favorable, stating that it helped break up Kucsulain's "relentless and slightly tiresome [vocal] cacophony" and suggested that it may "be a taster of much more melodic things to come." Begrand praised Kucsulain's range on the song as well as its genuinity, and hoped that Walls of Jericho would "explore this territory more in the future, and not let this song be just a one-off". In a 2007 interview with AllSchools, Kucsulain stated that Walls of Jericho were not "afraid of the controversy ["No Saving Me"] might cause" and told reviewers who did not understand the song to listen to the band's previous two albums, featuring other songs with Kucsulain's singing performances.

== Track listing ==
All tracks are written by Walls of Jericho.

Standard release
No.	Title	Length
1.	"A Trigger Full of Promises"	3:48
2.	"I Know Hollywood and You Ain't It"	2:39
3.	"And Hope to Die"	3:14
4.	"Plastic"	3:16
5.	"Try.Fail.Repeat"	3:13
6.	"The Haunted"	3:23
7.	"And the Dead Walk Again"	3:23
8.	"Another Day, Another Idiot"	1:58
9.	"No Saving Me"	4:08
10.	"Welcome Home"	2:17
11.	"With Devils Amongst Us All"	3:36
Total length:		35:01

US iTunes / Japanese bonus track
No.	Title	Length
12.	"The Revolving Door Strategy"	2:09
Total length:		37:10

== Personnel ==
Adapted from liner notes. Additional credits per Bandcamp.

Walls of Jericho
- Candace Kucsulain – lead vocals
- Mike Hasty – lead guitar
- Chris Rawson – rhythm guitar
- Aaron Ruby – bass, backing vocals
- Dustin Schoenhofer – drums

Production

- Ben Schiegel – production, engineering, mixing (9)
- Eric Rachel – mixing (at Trax East) (1–8, 10–11)
- Tom Baker – mastering (at Precision Mastering)

Artwork

- Aaron Ruby – paintings
- Adam Wentworth – design and layout
- Christopher K. George – band photo
Back-ups
- Matt Murphy
- Mary Claire Williams
- Mikey Brennan
- Ryan Helton
- Erik "Billy" Keserich
- Jesse James Hatfield
- Brian Burmeister
- Chadwick Tisch
- Perry Barbarino
- Jebediah
- Jeremiah Currier
- Mike D. Gaytan
- Austin P. Miller
- Turd (Ryan "Bart" Williams) Ferguson

== Charts ==
Chart performance for With Devils Amongst Us All
Chart (2006)	Peak position
US Heatseeker Albums (Billboard)	24
US Top Independent Albums (Billboard)	31

== Release history ==
Release history for With Devils Amongst Us All
Region	Label	Format	Date	Catalog #	Ref.
Europe	Trustkill; Roadrunner	CD	August 21, 2006	RR 8186-2	
United States	Trustkill	CD	August 22, 2006	TK82-2	
Japan	Trustkill; Roadrunner	CD	August 23, 2006	RRCD-31004	
Various	Trustkill	LP	October 17, 2025	TK082	
