= Mark O'Connell =

Mark O'Connell may refer to:

- Mark O'Connell (bishop) (born 1964), American Roman Catholic bishop
- Mark O'Connell (musician), drummer and former member of the band Taking Back Sunday
- Mark O'Connell (writer), Irish writer and author
