= Things in Herds =

English folk duo

Things in Herds were an English folk duo consisting of Pete Lush and Miss Ping.

== History ==
The band was formed in Brighton, U.K in 1999 by founding member and leading composer Lush. Soon after forming, Lush was joined by Miss Ping on vocals and harmonica, as well as various other musicians on instruments such as cello, synthesiser, and bass guitar.

Things in Herds have released three home recorded albums since 2002: I Can Dancing and Walking (TrustMe/Undecided), Everything Has to End Somewhere (Fence Records 2005) and Nothing is Lost (G-Folk 2008).
