= Andrea Longo =

Andrea Longo may refer to:

- Andrea Longo (runner) (born 1975), Italian middle-distance runner
- Andrea Longo (skier) (born 1971), Italian Nordic combined competitor
