= Undecided Records =

American record label

- Founded: 1998
- Founder: Clifford Weiner; Alexander Kenny
- Defunct: 2006
- Status: Inactive
- Distributors: Revelation; Victory; RED
- Genre: Hardcore punk; metalcore; post-hardcore; emo; indie rock
- Country of origin: United States
- Location: Lake Worth, Florida

Undecided Records was an American independent record label established in 1998 by Clifford Wiener and Alexander Kenny. The record company was founded in Loxahatchee, Florida but its headquarters moved around in various parts of Palm Beach County, Florida; first to Boca Raton, then to Parkland, and finally to Lake Worth. The record label released hardcore, metalcore, noisecore, post-hardcore, and emo music, with a principally North American roster of artists spanning from the late 1990s to the mid-2000s. Undecided Records released music on vinyl records, compact discs, and digital audio formats, with distribution in the United States originally through Revelation Records, then through Victory Records, and finally through Sony/RED Music. Wiener and Kenny were both closely associated with Eulogy Recordings, where they worked in their free time.

Undecided Records put out such notable releases as Poison the Well's Distance Makes the Heart Grow Fonder, Every Time I Die's The Burial Plot Bidding War, Supermachiner's Rise of the Great Machine, Breaking Pangaea's Take Apart the Words and Cannon to a Whisper, and Eiffel's Audiblenarcotic (also re-issued after the band's name was changed to Vaux). The record label was also responsible for producing a series of Metallica tribute splits titled Crush 'Em All, which included covers by BoySetsFire, Converge, Countervail, Disembodied, Indecision, Eighteen Visions, Poison the Well, Shai Hulud, Supermachiner, Today Is the Day, and Walls of Jericho. Many of the splits fell apart during varying production stages but Undecided Records compiled the bulk of the recorded cover songs on the Various Artists compilation The Old, The New, The Unreleased, released in January 2005. In September–October 2005, the record label organized The Undecided Records Tour, a two-month American tour featuring its signed bands Cru Jones, The Big Screen, Shindig, Hank Jones, Iscariot, and xRepresentx.

In 2003, Wiener, Kenny, and Michael Broder formed the imprint company Undecided Films, with plans to release theatrical films and digital video discs. The company's inaugural project was to be a theatrical reissue of F. W. Murnau's 1922 film Nosferatu, featuring a new score composed by Converge vocalist Jacob Bannon. Undecided Films' first DVD release later turned out to be the documentary Rockets Redglare!, dedicated to the memory of stand-up comedian Rockets Redglare, featuring interviews with Steve Buscemi, Jim Jarmusch, Matt Dillon, and Willem Dafoe. In June 2003, Undecided Records formed a partnership with Further Seems Forever bassist Chad Neptune, financing his own imprint record label Pompano Basic.

Undecided Records was dissolved in 2006 when Wiener and Kenny founded a series of new imprints. In May 2006, all of the straight-edge bands previously signed to Undecided Records were transferred to the new record label x1981x Records, which had already been founded as an apparel company, x1981x Clothing, in 2004. The remaining bands were transferred to a second new record label, 567 Records, including Further Seems Forever, which released the compilation The Final Curtain, and Jeremy Enigk, who released The Missing Link, both originally scheduled for Undecided Records. Undecided Records began re-releasing its entire back-catalog digitally in early 2007. Wiener, Kenny, and John Wylie of Eulogy Recordings later formed the artist management firm Big Hit Management in 2010. Wiener and Kenny also organized the music festival Bringin' it Back for the Kids Fest, which took place in 2011 and 2012.

== Artists ==
This is an archival list of artists who have worked with Undecided Records.

- As Hope Dies
- As the Sun Sets
- The Big Screen
- The Blood of Thine Enemies
- BoySetsFire
- Breaking Pangaea
- Burn the Mountain Down
- The Casket Lottery
- Converge
- Countervail
- Cru Jones
- Dark Angel Divine
- Dawn of Orion
- Dust to Dust
- Dear Lover
- Disembodied
- Eiffel
- Eighteen Visions
- El Toro
- The Enkindels
- Eulcid
- Every Time I Die
- Fallen from the Sky
- Further Seems Forever
- Hank Jones
- Hearts Over Rome
- HoldXFast
- House of Atreus
- Indecision
- Iscariot
- Isle of View
- Jeremy Enigk
- Jupiter Sunrise
- Madison
- Malakhai
- Miasis
- New Idea Society
- Poison the Well
- Reflector
- xRepresentx
- Scott Stapleton
- Shai Hulud
- Shindig
- Spread the Disease
- Staynless
- Supermachiner
- Things in Herds
- Today Is the Day
- Upper Class Trash
- Urtica
- Vaux
- Venusian Skyline
- Walls of Jericho

== See also ==
- List of record labels
