= No Hurt Like a Broken Heart =

Studio album by Palm Springs
- Released: 5 March 2007
- Recorded: 2004–2006 at Church Road Studios, Hove, East Sussex
- Genre: Chamber pop
- Length: 37:34
- Label: Random Acts of Vinyl
- Producers: Palm Springs and Paul Pascoe

Palm Springs chronology
No Hurt Like a Broken Heart (2007)	The Hope That Kills You (2010)

Singles from No Hurt Like a Broken Heart
- 1. "Tender Remains / Fall Morning" Released: 2004; 2. "Echo of Me / After Honey" Released: 2005; 3. "Softly to Fallen / Sense of Wonder" Released: 2006

No Hurt Like a Broken Heart is the first studio album by independent rock band Palm Springs.

== Background ==
The record is Palm Springs' debut full-length album, the culmination of three 7-inch singles – "Tender Remains", "Echo of Me" and "Softly to Fallen" – all of which were released through their own label, Random Acts of Vinyl.

== Release ==
Though initial copies of the album were distributed in the UK in 2006, the album received a full release, distributed by Cargo Records in the UK and Europe on 5 March 2007.

== Track listing ==
All songs on the album were written by Cane and Russo, except "Echo of Me" which was written by Cane, Russo and Le Marchand.

1. "Echo of Me" (3:50)
2. "After Honey" (2:20)
3. "The Broken" (3:48)
4. "Softly to Fallen" (4:20)
5. "The Cold Light" (3:40)
6. "Fall Morning" (4:12)
7. "There Is a Darkness" (3:00)
8. "I Am Dust" (4:00)
9. "Sense of Wonder" (4:10)
10. "Tender Remains" (4:14)

== Personnel ==
All tracks on the album were performed by Cane (vocals, guitar, drums, percussion, piano, melodica, glockenspiel, Casio VL Tone, keyboards) and Russo (guitar, bass, drums, percussion, piano, melodica, glockenspiel, Casio VL Tone, stylophone, keyboards, samples, programming, backing vocals), with the following additional personnel:

- Abi Fry – viola on "After Honey"
- Alice MacGill – cello on "I Am Dust," "Sense Of Wonder," "There Is a Darkness"
- David Young Jr – drums on "Echo of Me"
- David Young Sr – piano on "Echo of Me"
- Isabel Albiol Estrada – spoken word on "There Is a Darkness," sleeve layout design
- Jeffers Mayo – additional electric guitar on "I Am Dust", "Softly to Fallen"
- Julie McDermott – backing vocals on "After Honey," "The Cold Light"
- Kah – backing vocals on "Fall Morning," "I Am Dust," "Sense Of Wonder," "Softly To Fallen," "Tender Remains," "The Broken," "There Is a Darkness"
- Mark Jesson – cello on "The Broken"
- Paul Pascoe – acoustic guitar on "Echo of Me," Additional electric guitar on "The Broken," backing vocals on "I Am Dust," lead guitar on "Softly to Fallen"
- Ralph Shotter – electric guitar on "Echo of Me"
- Richard Luck – piano on "There Is a Darkness"
- DC Cane – cover photography

== Accolades ==
Professional ratings
Review scores
Source	Rating
Allmusic	3.5/5 stars
Tatapoum	4.5/5 stars
No Ripcord	4/5 stars
Is This Music?	4/5 stars
Norman Records	4.5/5 stars

- Mr Dead & Mrs Free, Berlin "Album of the Month" link
- "Recommended Release" Rounder Records, Brighton
- No Hurt Like a Broken Heart placed second (after Scott Walker's The Drift) in Wolfgang Doebeling (Editor of German Rolling Stone's list of "Best Albums of 2006."
- The album artwork for No Hurt Like a Broken Heart was included in the first Spex Magazine Contemporary Album Cover Design compilation book of, "outstanding cover designs".
