= Roberto Longo (cyclist) =

Italian cyclist

Personal information
- Full name: Roberto Longo
- Born: 3 December 1984 (age 41) Soave, Italy

Cycling career
- Sport: Cycling
- Current team: Retired
- Discipline: Road
- Role: Rider

Professional team
- 2007–2008: Lampre–Fondital

Roberto Longo (born 3 December 1984, in Soave) is a retired Italian professional road racing cyclist who last rode for Lampre.

== Career ==
During Stage 4 of the 2007 Eneco Tour, Longo was part of the early breakaway, which held a gap of seven minutes at one point. Unfortunately, the break was caught with 30 kilometres to go, and Longo finished in 145th position. The 2007 Tour de Pologne started with a three kilometre Team time trial where Lampre–Fondital went out early and fast beating the rain and the other teams to win the stage. Although Longo's teammate Fabio Baldato was thought to have crossed the line first Longo wore the yellow leaders jersey into stage 2 where he then lost it to Graeme Brown. Longo took his only top 10 in a stage of a tour at the 2008 Tour of Turkey where in stage 7 he sprinted to ninth after leading out team sprinter David Loosli to fourth position.

== Major results ==
2006
1st Piccola Coppa Agostoni
3rd Trofeo Città di Brescia
5th Circuito del Porto
2007
1st Stage 1 (TTT) Tour de Pologne
3rd Trofeo Lindo e Sano
