= Antonio Longo =

Antonio Longo may refer to:

- Antonio Longo (painter) (1740–1820), Italian painter and priest
- Antonio Longo, former member of the music group Taking Back Sunday
