= Longo's =

Canadian supermarket chain

Longo Brothers Fruit Markets Inc.

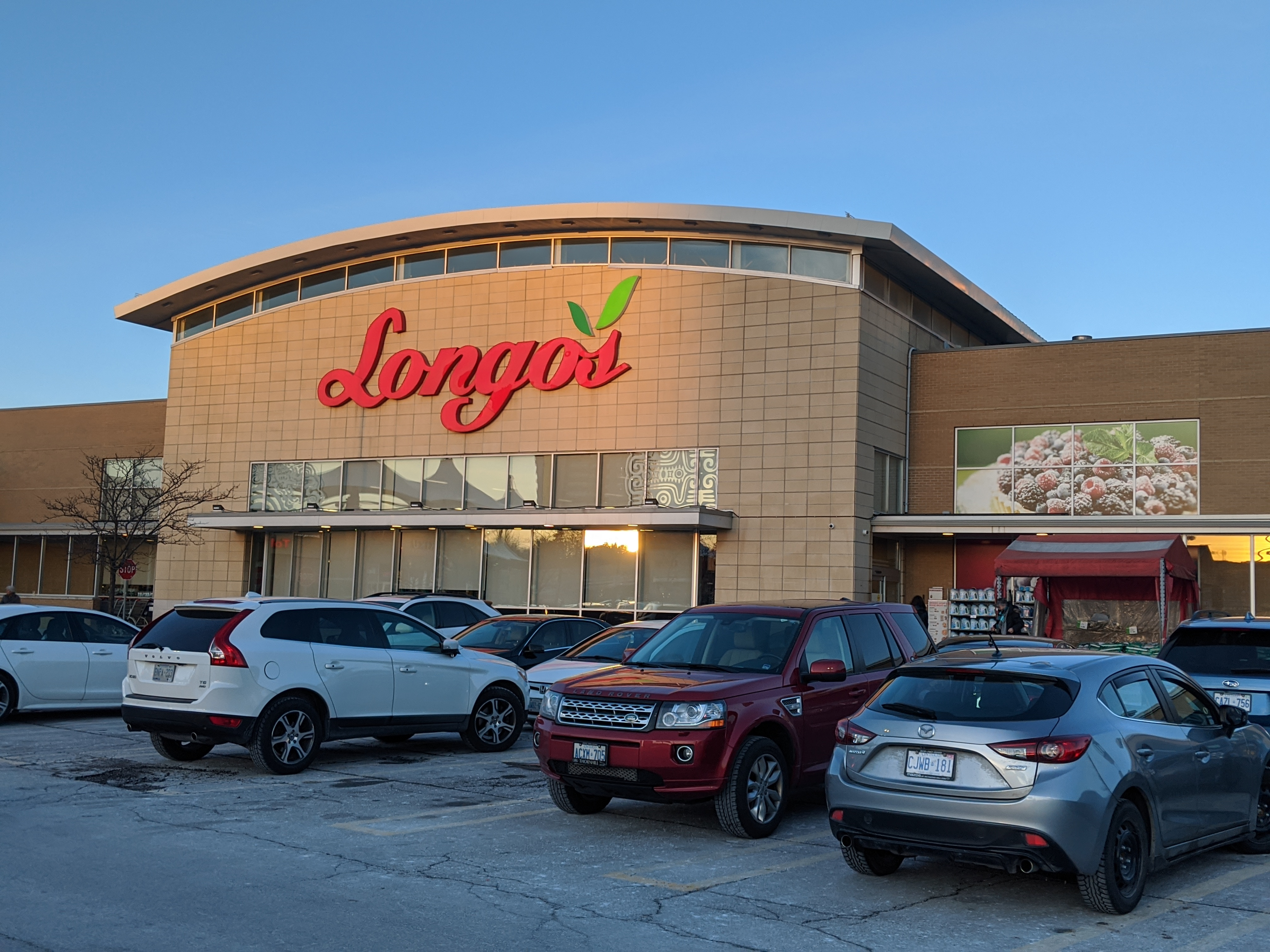
- Longo's on York Mills Road in Toronto
- Trade name: Longo's
- Type: Private
- Industry: Retail
- Founded: 1956 in Toronto, Ontario, Canada
- Founders: Tommy, Joe and Gus Longo
- Headquarters: Vaughan, Ontario, Canada
- Number of locations: 45
- Area served: Southern Ontario
- Products: Bakery, dairy, delicatessen, frozen foods, general grocery, meat and poultry, produce, seafood, snacks, pharmacy (at six locations), flowers, Starbucks
- Owners: Empire Company (51%); Longo family (49%)
- Number of employees: 5,000+
- Website: www.longos.com

Longo Brothers Fruit Markets Inc., commonly known as Longo's, is a Canadian chain of retail supermarkets and grocery delivery service that serves the Southern Ontario area. It is controlled by Sobeys parent Empire Company in partnership with the founding Longo family. Its corporate office is located in Vaughan, Ontario, and it operates locations mainly in the Greater Toronto and Hamilton Area.

== History ==
Longo's was founded in 1956 by Italian immigrant brothers Joe, Tommy and Gus Longo, who immigrated to Canada in 1951 from Termini Imerese, Sicily. They established their first store at the intersection of Yonge Street and Castlefield Avenue in Toronto, with the name "Broadway Fruit Market". This store was about 139 square metres (1,500 sq ft), and it had eight family members working there. After the Longo family joined Antonino in Canada, they opened a store on Yonge Street in 1956. A year after the father's death in 1961, the store moved to East York.

Their second location was in Malton, at the southeast corner of Airport and Derry. A gas explosion in 1969 destroyed many businesses in the community, but the Longo family cleaned up and reopened a few days later. They sold their Toronto store in 1971 to focus on their Malton operations as the company continued to expand. In 1998, Tommy's son Anthony became the president of Longo's.

Eldest brother Tommy Longo stocking shelves at their storefront c.1960s

Longo's publishes a free magazine called Experience Magazine. In 2004, Longo's acquired the online grocery retailer Grocery Gateway.

Longo's owns and operates 36 stores, mostly in the Greater Toronto and Hamilton Area, including several smaller-format "The Market by Longo's" stores in downtown and midtown Toronto. A 4,500-square-metre (48,000 sq ft) flagship store opened at Maple Leaf Square in downtown Toronto. In September 2016, the chain's southwesternmost location opened in Ancaster, making it the first in Hamilton.

Longo's employs more than 5,000 people, and was named one of Canada's Top 50 privately managed companies by the Financial Post newspaper for nine consecutive years (2000–2008), achieving platinum status.

Joe Longo Sr. died on September 15, 2008, at the age of 70. Tommy Longo died on January 30, 2011, at the age of 76.

On March 16, 2021, it was announced that Empire Company, parent company of Sobeys, would buy a 51% stake in Longo's and its Grocery Gateway e-commerce business (which was acquired by Longo's in 2004) for $357 million. The deal, which closed in May 2021, included a clause allowing Sobeys' share to increase in future years. According to the announcement, the Longo's stores and Grocery Gateway "will continue to be led by CEO Anthony Longo". The plan was subject to review by the Competition Bureau.

In September 2021, the Grocery Gateway delivery service was folded under the Longo's banner, with the transitional name "Longo's delivered by Grocery Gateway". At the time of the Empire sale, the company said the Longo's delivery operation would continue as a standalone business, but that it might collaborate with Sobeys' own Voilà delivery brand. On July 4, 2023, Empire announced that it was discontinuing the Longo's / Grocery Gateway delivery service, with customers gradually being redirected to Voilà, and additional Longo's private label products being made available through that service.

There are 43 locations.

== See also ==
- List of supermarket chains in Canada
