= The Color Fred =

American rock band

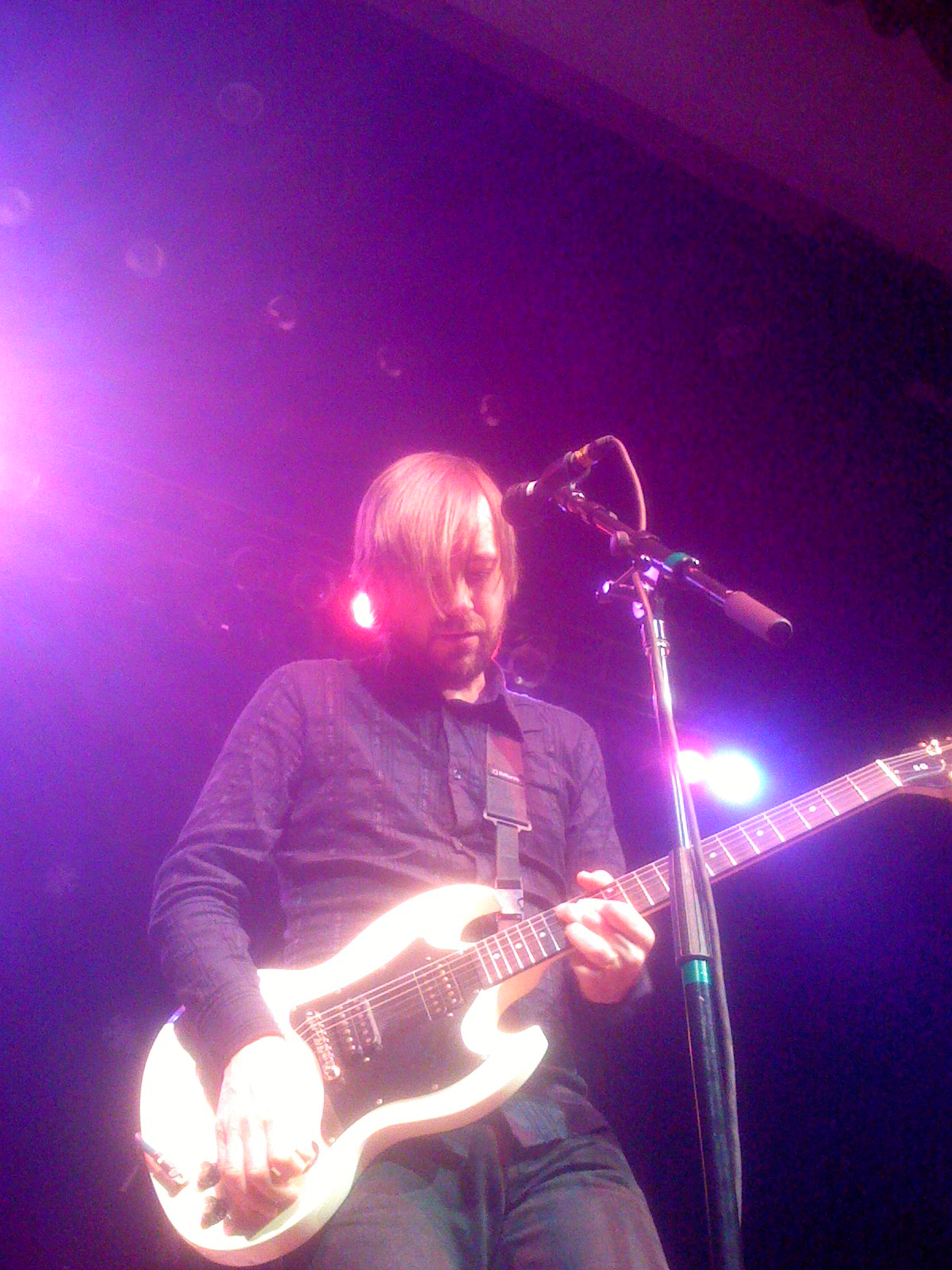
- Fred Mascherino performing in 2007

Background information
- Origin: West Chester, Pennsylvania, United States
- Genres: Indie rock; alternative rock; emo
- Years active: 2003–present
- Labels: Equal Vision; Heading East
- Spinoff of: Taking Back Sunday
- Members: Fred Mascherino; Stephen Angello; Keith Gibbons; John Hoff
- Past members: Matthew Fleischman; Steve Curtiss; PJ Bond; Padraig Murphy; Chris Poulsen; Jeff Judy; Carter Wilson; Monte Holt
- Website: Official Website

The Color Fred is a band headed by former Taking Back Sunday guitarist and singer Fred Mascherino. The band got their name by a poll taken on the internet and The Color Fred was declared as the fans' favorite name.

== History ==
The band was started while he was in the band Breaking Pangaea. The Color Fred was featured on a compilation by Equal Vision Records in 2005. Mascherino has worked with Macbeth Athletics to design and produce the F. P. Mascho, as part of Macbeth's Studio Projects. The shoe displayed the drawings of Jude Ianelli that also appeared on The Color Fred's official website, and some lyrics.

On October 4, 2007, Mascherino left Taking Back Sunday to concentrate on his new project full-time.

Bend to Break, TCF's first album, was released on October 30, 2007. The album hit No. 8 on the Billboard Heatseekers chart. The Color Fred released The Intervention EP in April 2009. The EP features new and old songs performed acoustic, plus two home demos.

A DVD has been in the works for the band since early 2008. Mascherino stated that it would contrast the differences between life on the road with The Color Fred and Fred's former band, Taking Back Sunday. This would go unreleased until February 2019, when it was uploaded to Youtube by Mascherino himself.

The project was put on hold so that Mascherino could focus on his new band, Terrible Things with Andy Jackson and Josh Eppard. On The Color Fred's Myspace page, Fred said: "A lot of people have been asking about TCF as well. I still love all the songs I've put out through that so it will continue to be my solo project that I'll do when the new band is on break... if it ever is! But I really feel that if you were ever a fan of the music I've been so lucky to make over the years, you won't be let down by the Terrible Things record. I want to thank you guys especially for supporting me all these years and especially during the last 2 years while I was rebuilding and rethinking everything about what I do. It really helped to have my TCF fans when things got hard. I won't let you guys down - Fred"

In 2012, Mascherino toured as The Color Fred for the Super Karate Tour

On January 29, 2019, a new website for The Color Fred went online, announcing that Fred was in the studio recording new material for the band. On May 1, 2019, The Color Fred released their first new recording in ten years, "Don't Give Up on Me."

On August 27, 2020, The Color Fred premiered on their YouTube channel the video for a new song, "Lost & Lonely", which was directed by bassist Keith Gibbons. Then on March 2, 2021, the video for another new song, "Crooked Mile", was premiered and also directed by Gibbons. The two songs would be included on the band's first studio album in 15 years, A Year and Change, which was released on April 1, 2022, via Mascherino's own Heading East Records.

== Members ==
- Fred Mascherino (lead vocals/lead guitar)
- Keith Gibbons (bass guitar)
- Stephen Angello (rhythm guitar/backing vocals)
- Monte Holt (drums/Piano/vocals)

== Discography ==
Studio albums

- Bend to Break (2007)
- A Year and Change (2022)

EPs

- The Intervention EP (2009)

Singles

- "Hate to See You Go"
- "If I Surrender"
- "Don't Give Up on Me"

Music videos

- "If I Surrender" (directed by Andrew Paul Bowser)
- "Hate to See You Go" (directed by Andrew Paul Bowser & Joseph M. Petrick)
- "Lost & Lonely" (directed by Keith Gibbons)
- "Crooked Mile" (directed by Keith Gibbons)
