= Breaking Pangaea =

American pop band

- Origin: Philadelphia, Pennsylvania, U.S.
- Genres: Emo; pop-punk; alternative rock
- Years active: 2000–2004; 2019
- Labels: Equal Vision; Undecided
- Past members: Fred Mascherino; Clint Stelfox; Will Noon

Breaking Pangaea was an American emo pop band from Philadelphia, Pennsylvania, United States. The band gained a small but passionate following from early 2000 to 2003, especially among college students.

The band released their debut EP and full-length album on Florida's Undecided Records and released a follow-up EP on Equal Vision Records.

== History ==
The band was started by an 18-year-old Will Noon, who met Fred Mascherino at a concert of Mascherino's former band Brody. Noon and Mascherino decided to form a band, and when Mascherino brought in bassist Clint Stelfox the trio set to work. They played their first concert in January 2000, opening for The Movielife and Silent Majority. They then set out to create their first EP, entitled Take Apart the Words in December 2000. Undecided Records later decided they wanted to distribute the EP, which the band toured on for a year on three self-booked tours.

In December 2001, Breaking Pangaea released their debut album, Cannon to a Whisper, with Undecided Records. Produced by Mike Fanuele and recorded in College Park, Maryland, the album was a hit with college students. At the peak of its popularity, it was #23 on the College Music Chart. The band spent about a year touring this album, setting off late 2001 and continuing well into 2002, opening for such acts as Recover, Coheed and Cambria, Hey Mercedes and Further Seems Forever. In October and November, the band embarked on a headlining US tour. In December, the band played a handful of US shows with the Exit, and Liars Academy.

In February 2003, the band supported Hey Mercedes on their headlining US tour, which was followed by a tour with Brazil, which ran into March. The band spent a week of shows supporting Taking Back Sunday. In March and April, the band toured across the US with Armor for Sleep, This Day Forward, and Northstar, leading to an appearance at Skate and Surf Fest. On 6 May, Breaking Pangaea recorded their second and final EP called Phoenix. This time, however, it was recorded with Equal Vision Records. The album was recorded in Big Blue Meenie Studios, where Taking Back Sunday and Thursday have worked. The band's planned shows with Brand New and Onelinedrawing were cancelled for unknown reasons. They toured with Rx Bandits in July and August. Mascherino later joined Taking Back Sunday as guitarist.

Having lost their lead singer and guitarist, Noon and Stelfox called it quits. Soon after, Noon was approached by ex-Taking Back Sunday members John Nolan and Shaun Cooper to join their new band Straylight Run. Eager to continue playing music, Noon accepted the offer. Stelfox went on to play guitar for the Maryland based band, Zella Mayzell and Amarie Coma.

Breaking Pangaea played in January 2004 at the First Unitarian Church in Philadelphia, where Mascherino told the audience that it would not be their final show.

In February 2019, the band announced a one off reunion show on April 14, 2019, at Ortlieb's in Philadelphia.

== Band members ==
- Fred Mascherino – Guitar, Vocals
- Clint Stelfox – Bass
- Will Noon – Drums

== Discography ==
Studio albums

- Cannon to a Whisper (2001)

EPs

- Take Apart the Words (2000)
- Phoenix (2003)
