= Terrible Things =

American alternative rock band

- Origin: West Chester, Pennsylvania, United States
- Genres: Alternative rock
- Years active: 2009–present
- Label: Universal Motown
- Members: Fred Mascherino; Aaron Van Allen; Steve Curtiss
- Past members: Josh Eppard; Andy Jackson; Steve Lucarelli; Anthony Martone; Brian Weaver; Jake Sloan

Terrible Things is an alternative rock supergroup initially formed in 2009 by Fred Mascherino, formerly of Taking Back Sunday, Andy Jackson of Hot Rod Circuit, and Josh Eppard, from Coheed and Cambria. The group released a self-titled album on August 31, 2010. The debut album was produced by Jason Elgin and centered on an outbreak of arson events in member Mascherino's birthplace, Coatesville, Pennsylvania. The album was released on Universal Records and debuted at #25 on the Billboard Heatseekers chart.

Terrible Things stayed on the road throughout 2010 and 2011 on tours with Minus the Bear, Bayside, Story of the Year, The Offspring and Sick Puppies. They also played on The Vans Warped Tour in 2010 and 2011.

On April 20, 2011, Andy Jackson announced that he was leaving Terrible Things. The band toured throughout the 2011 Warped Tour dates as a three-piece, with Fred Mascherino handling all guitar duties and Eppard singing backing vocals.

On November 16, 2011, it was announced that Josh Eppard had rejoined Coheed and Cambria. Eppard confirmed through Twitter that his "...time in Terrible Things [had] come to an end."

On June 20, 2012, a new line-up for the band was announced, including bassist and backing vocalist Aaron Van Allen and drummer Steve Curtiss, who also played in Mascherino's solo project The Color Fred. They were working on a new album.

In 2013, the band released a Kickstarter campaign to publish a book of guitar tabs featuring their songs.

== Band members ==
Current members

- Fred Mascherino – lead vocals, guitar (2009–present)
- Aaron Van Allen – bass guitar, backing vocals (2012–present)
- Steve Curtiss – drums, percussion (2012–present)

Session members

- Jacob Bunton – bass guitar, piano (2009–2010)

Former members

- Steve Lucarelli – bass guitar (2009)
- Anthony Martone – drums, percussion (2009)
- Andy Jackson – guitar, vocals (2009–2011)
- Brian Weaver – bass guitar (2010–2012)
- Josh Eppard – drums, percussion, backing vocals (2009–2011)

== Discography ==
- Terrible Things (Universal Motown Records, 2010)
- Pre-Transmission EP (2012)
