= Fred Mascherino =

American musician (born 1974)

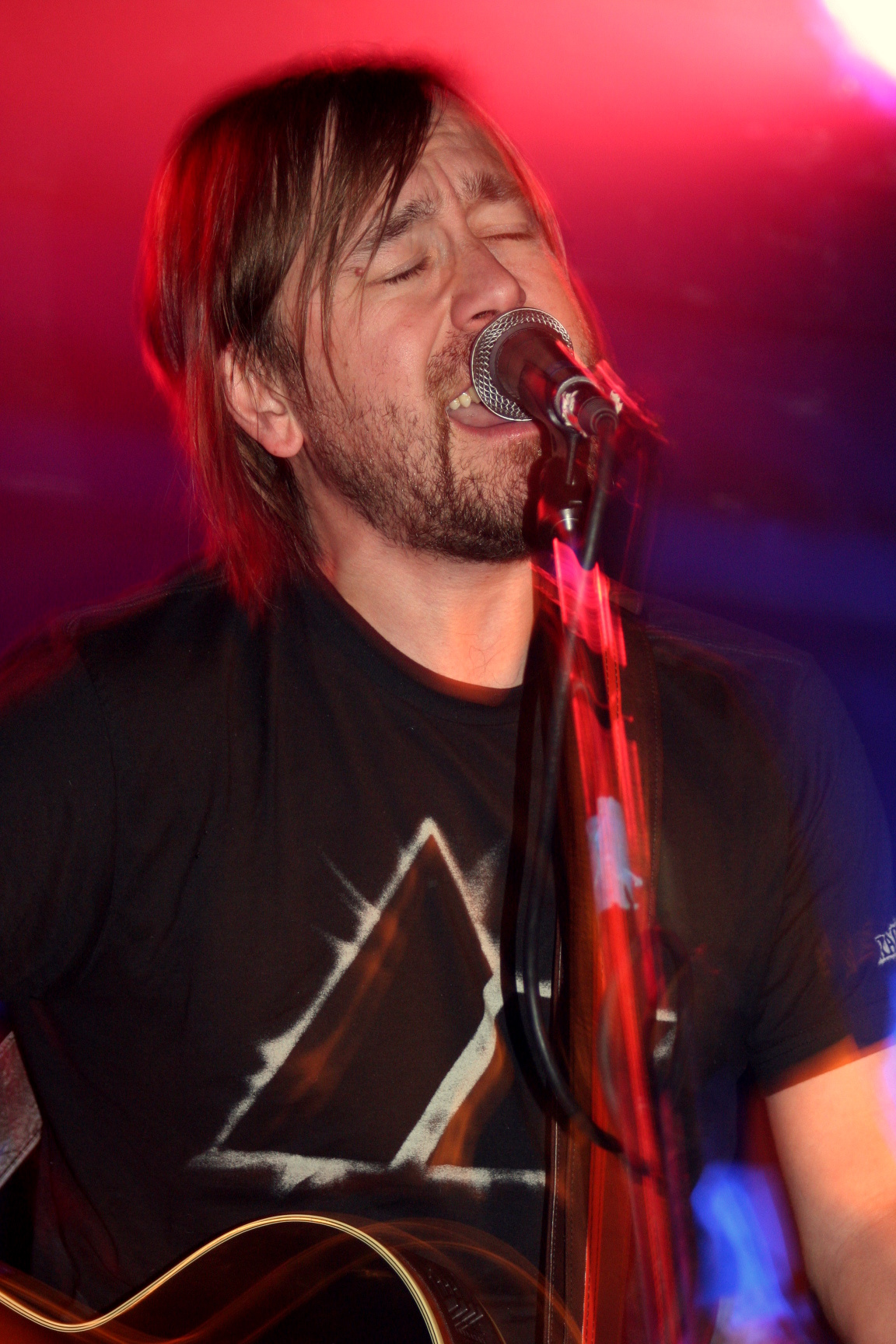
- Mascherino in 2007

Background information
- Born: Frederick Paul Mascherino; July 27, 1974 (age 52); Coatesville, Pennsylvania
- Genres: Alternative rock; indie rock; pop punk; power pop; folk rock; emo
- Occupations: Musician; songwriter
- Instruments: Guitar; vocals; bass guitar; keyboards; drums
- Years active: 1992–present
- Labels: Undecide; Victory; Warner Bros.; Equal Vision; Universal Motown; Heading East
- Member of: The Color Fred; Terrible Things; Say Anything
- Formerly of: Breaking Pangaea; Taking Back Sunday
- Website: thecolorfred.com

Frederick Paul Mascherino (born July 27, 1974) is an American musician best known for his work as lead guitarist and co-lead vocalist in alternative rock band Taking Back Sunday. He is currently active with bands The Color Fred, Say Anything, and Taking Back Sunday as a touring member. Fred is also known for working with Terrible Things. He also runs the record label Heading East Records. He is vegan and straight edge.

== Biography ==
Mascherino was born in West Chester, Pennsylvania, and raised in Coatesville, Pennsylvania. He graduated from Temple University in Philadelphia, where he earned a degree in Jazz Guitar. Fred is an active environmentalist and has been a vegan since 1996.

== Career ==
=== Brody (1992–1999) ===
From 1992 to 1999, Mascherino was in a band named Brody, whose members included Kevin Ruggeri, Bill Loughin, Billy Warburton, Brodie Ruland, Keith Cucuzza, Pat Higgins and Dan Sagherian. It was during this time that he met Eddie Reyes, then of Clockwise. Brody released a 7-inch EP on Creep Records entitled "Against Forgetting" and a full-length CD entitled "Worth Dying For" on Harvest records. The band was also featured on several compilations, including Blackout! Records' "Punk Rock Jukebox."

=== Breaking Pangaea (2000–2003) ===
In 2000, after Brody broke up, Mascherino became lead singer and guitarist for Breaking Pangaea, a band from Philadelphia. Other members included drummer Will Noon, and bassist Clint Stelfox. They were taken on by Florida label Undecided Records, and produced EP "Take Apart the Words" and full-length CD "A Cannon to a Whisper".

In May 2003, Breaking Pangaea released an EP entitled "Phoenix" through Equal Vision Records.

In 2004, the members of Breaking Pangaea met up again and played to a sold out crowd at the First Unitarian Church in Philly. From the stage, Mascherino told the crowd it would not be their last show.

=== Taking Back Sunday (2003–2007, 2025) ===
Mascherino joined Taking Back Sunday in 2003, replacing original guitarist/singer John Nolan after Nolan left the band with bassist Shaun Cooper to pursue different musical interests with Straylight Run. During his stint with Taking Back Sunday, Mascherino was a major collaborator, and was responsible for co-writing the majority of Louder Now, as well as many songs from Where You Want To Be.

Fred's main guitar is a Gibson SG Special, while his main amp consists of a Marshall JCM 800 2203 100-watt head, and a Marshall 1960A cabinet with Celestion Greenback speakers. He notes that the cabinet accounts for 75% of his sound.

During the 2006 Taste of Chaos tour (for which Taking Back Sunday was headlining), Fred returned home due to family commitments. His bandmates were forced to continue without him, supported onstage by members of Saosin, Anti-Flag and Underoath. It was later revealed that Mascherino's family commitments were in regard to his mother-in-law's battle with cancer.

On October 4, it was announced that Mascherino had left the band to work on his solo project, The Color Fred.

On July 25, 2025, Taking Back Sunday announced that due to health priorities, John Nolan would not be performing on the 2025 Summer tour. In his place, Mascherino will be performing with Taking Back Sunday for their 2025 Summer tour. The full explanation and story appears on Taking Back Sunday's YouTube channel.

=== The Color Fred (2006–present) ===
The Color Fred is Mascherino's solo project. On October 30, 2007, Equal Vision Records released a full-length CD for the project titled "Bend to Break". Although considered a solo project, Fred was joined on the recording by Steve Curtiss on drums, PJ Bond on bass and backing vocals and Keys/piano played by Breaking Pangaea bassist, Clint Stelfox. At the time of the CD's release, the group was on tour with Straylight Run followed by tours with Angels and Airwaves, The Vans Warped Tour and the Give It A Name Tour in the UK with Four Year Strong and Mayday Parade.

On April 18, 2009, an acoustic CD titled, The Color Fred "The Intervention EP" was released to commemorate Record Store Day. The CD had acoustic versions and demos of songs from "Bend to Break" as well as unreleased songs. Fred supported this release playing acoustic on tours with Craig Owens and The Summer Aesthetic.

On April 1, 2022, having reunited with a new lineup three years prior, The Color Fred released its sophomore album, A Year and Change, on indie label Heading East Records, which was founded by Mascherino earlier in the year.

=== Terrible Things ===
On October 25, 2009, Mascherino and Andy Jackson (Death in the Park/ex-Hot Rod Circuit) announced plans for a new music project called Initials. The band later changed its name to Terrible Things. They were soon joined by ex-Coheed and Cambria drummer, Josh Eppard, and released their first full-length album, Terrible Things, on August 31, 2010. The album is a concept album revolving around a string of arson fires in Mascherino's hometown, Coatesville, Pennsylvania. On April 20, 2011, Andy Jackson announced that he was leaving the band. The band and Jackson are still on good terms, and the band has continued without him, with Eppard aiding Mascherino with vocal duties. In November 2011, Josh Eppard left to rejoin Coheed and Cambria. Fred worked on a new Terrible Things album with producer, Jason Elgin.

=== The Lemonheads ===
In the winter of 2012, Fred spent 9 weeks on the road playing bass for The Lemonheads. The band was playing "It's a Shame About Ray" in its entirety, one of Fred's favorite albums in college.

=== Solo ===
In Spring 2012, Mascherino announced a small solo tour throughout the northeast region of the United States. Named the "Super Karate Tour," the live shows also feature Scott Reynolds, vocalist for All and the Pavers, as well as Philadelphia, PA-based Toy Cannons.

=== Say Anything ===
During the summer of 2014, Mascherino joined the indie-punk group Say Anything as a touring guitarist and backup vocalist for the group's Hebrews Tour. He rejoined the recently reformed band in 2023 and appears on their newest single "Psyche!" as well as on their ninth album, ...Is Committed.

=== Producing ===
Mascherino is credited as a producer and engineer on the 2014 EP Light Years and Heavy Lifting by Only on Weekends. He also produced the 2014 EP "Every Light" by Modern Suits.

On March 26, 2015, Mascherino performed a guitar solo on the Double Experience track "Goddamn Mimetic Business" Mascherino also performed a guitar solo on Joe Matera's "Endless Summer", from his debut album Creature of Habit, released in 2012.

Released on September 18, 2024, Mascherino performed guest vocals on the track "Without a Doubt" on the self-titled album by Mighty Tortuga, a band signed to Heading East Records. He also produced and engineered the album alongside Stephen Angello.
