= Say Anything discography =

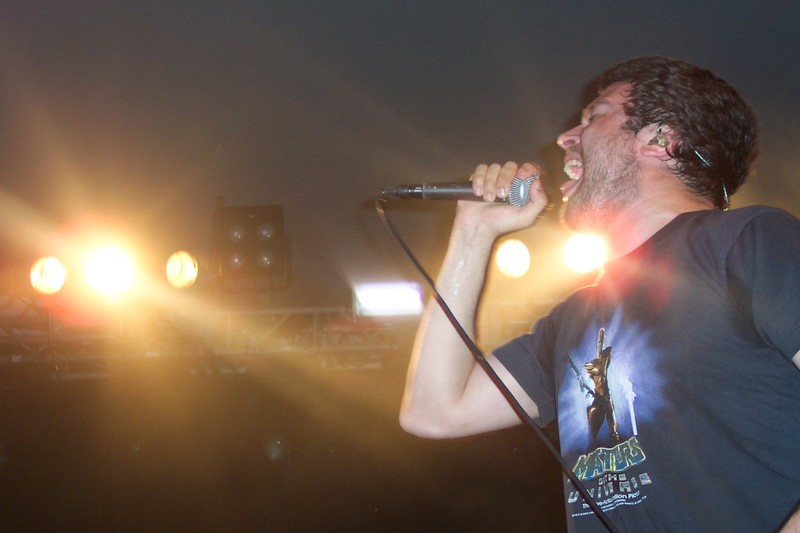
- Max Bemis of Say Anything
- Studio albums: 8
- Extended plays: 4
- Singles: 9
- B-sides: 49
- Music videos: 9

The discography of Say Anything, an American rock band from Los Angeles, California. Say Anything is composed of Max Bemis (lead vocals), Coby Linder (drums), Jake Turner (guitar, vocals), Jeff Turner (guitar, vocals), and Parker Case (keyboard, vocals). They have released eight studio albums, four EPs, and seven singles (along with music videos for each single). In addition, they have appeared on numerous compilation albums and have recorded many tracks that were never officially released.

In addition to this, as with any band with a large fanbase, there exist numerous live recordings of Say Anything, often recorded off of radio programs such as DJ Rossstar and GTFU.

== Studio albums ==
Year	Album	Chart positions				Sales
Year	Album	Billboard 200	Top Heatseekers	US Alternative Albums	US Rock Albums	Sales
2001	Baseball: An Album by Sayanything: Released: 2001; Label: Self-released	—	—	—	—	
2004	...Is a Real Boy: Released: August 3, 2004; Label: Doghouse	—	8	—	—	20,000
2007	In Defense of the Genre: Released: October 23, 2007; Label: J	27	—	8	12	25,228
2009	Say Anything: Released: November 3, 2009; Label: RCA	25	—	7	9	16,647
2012	Anarchy, My Dear: Released: March 13, 2012; Label: Equal Vision	22	—	4	5	11,960
2014	Hebrews: Released: June 10, 2014; Label: Equal Vision	37	—	7	—	17,950
2016	I Don't Think It Is: Released: February 5, 2016; Label: Equal Vision	31	—	3	2	19,000
2019	Oliver Appropriate: Released: January 25, 2019; Label: Dine Alone	—	—	—	—	—
2024	...Is Committed: Released: May 24, 2024; Label: Dine Alone	—	—	—	—	—

== Mixtapes ==
Release date	Title	Label
December 4, 2025	The Noise of Say Anything's Room Without...	Rory Records

== Live albums ==
Release date	Title	Label
NA	Purevolume Studio Sessions Featuring Say Anything	PureVolume
2009	The Myspace Transmissions	N/A
July 7, 2011	Daytrotter Digital EP	Daytrotter
2014	Say Anything/Matt Pryor: Daytrotter Presents N. 23	Daytrotter
2025	Say Anything ...Is A Real Boy (Live Version)	Doghouse Records

== Compilation albums ==
Release date	Title	Label
2011	Playlist: The Very Best Of Say Anything	J Records
2013	All My Friends Are Enemies: Early Rarities	Equal Vision Records
2021	Makeup for Lost Times	Self Released

== Extended plays and splits ==
Release date	Title	Label
2000	Junior Varsity	Self-released
2001	In Your Dreams	Self-released
2002	Menorah/Majora EP	Self-released
May 2004	For Sale...	Doghouse
April 2008	Say Anything/Manchester Orchestra Tour Download Card	N/A
November 3, 2009	Secret Origins	N/A
October 3, 2012	Say Anarchy Fall 2012 Tour Sampler	N/A
May 10, 2013	Say Anything/Eisley	Equal Vision Records
September 4, 2014	Say Anything/Saves The Day Digital Tour Split	N/A
April 20, 2016	Say Anything/mewithoutYou	NA
March 31, 2017	Say Anything/Bayside	Equal Vision Records & Hopeless Records
July 16, 2024	The Emo Singer	Dine Alone Records
October 10, 2025	...Is Committed (Remixes)	Dine Alone Records
2025	...Is Sleazy	Rory Records

== Singles ==
Year	Single	Peak chart positions	Album	
Year	Single	US Alternative	Album	
2003	"A Boston Peace"	—	Non-album single(s)	
2005	"Belt (Acoustic)"	—	Non-album single(s)	
2005	"Alive with the Glory of Love"	28	...Is a Real Boy	
2007	"Wow, I Can Get Sexual Too"	—	...Was a Real Boy	
2007	"Baby Girl, I'm a Blur"	29	In Defense of the Genre	
2008	"Shiksa (Girlfriend)"	—	In Defense of the Genre	
2008	"Skinny Mean Man"	—	In Defense of the Genre	
2008	"Spores"	—	In Defense of the Genre	
2009	"Hate Everyone"	31	Say Anything	
2010	"Do Better"	-	Say Anything	
2011	"Burn a Miracle"	—	Anarchy, My Dear	
2012	"Say Anything"	—	Anarchy, My Dear	
2014	"Six Six Six"	—	Hebrews	
2014	"Judas Decapitation"	—	Hebrews	
2014	"Hebrews"	—	Hebrews	
2018	"Daze"	—	Oliver Appropriate	
2018	"Pink Snot"	—	Oliver Appropriate	
2018	"It's a Process"	—	Oliver Appropriate	
2018	"Send You Off"	—	Oliver Appropriate	
2018	"It's Chill"	—	Non-Album Track	
2022	"Angeles (De Los Angelinos)"	—	Non-Album Track	
2023	"Psyche!"	—	...Is Committed	
2023	"Are You In There"	—	...Is Committed	
2023	"Carrie & Lowell & Cody (Pendent)"	—	...Is Committed	
2024	"I, Vibrator"	—	...Is Committed	
2024	"On Cum"	—	...Is Committed	
2025	"Death Dancing"	—	The Noise of Say Anything's Room Without	
2025	"Fuckbuddy"	—	The Noise of Say Anything's Room Without	
2025	"Maxie's Choice"	—	The Noise of Say Anything's Room Without	
2025	"The Band The Used"	—	The Noise of Say Anything's Room Without	
2025	"Death by Throat"	—	The Noise of Say Anything's Room Without	
2025	"Fanz !!!"	—	The Noise of Say Anything's Room Without	
2025	"Promethea Dupree-Bemis"	—	The Noise of Say Anything's Room Without	
2025	"I Will Never Lie to Lucy"	—	The Noise of Say Anything's Room Without	
2025	"Fifty Things"	—	The Noise of Say Anything's Room Without	
2025	"No Man"	—	The Noise of Say Anything's Room Without	
2025	"Say Anything Is... A Well-Known Cottage"	—	The Noise of Say Anything's Room Without	
2025	"Both"	—	The Noise of Say Anything's Room Without	
2025	"Nardo"	—	The Noise of Say Anything's Room Without	
2025	"You Could Feel Really Cool"	—	The Noise of Say Anything's Room Without	
2025	"Moran"	—	The Noise of Say Anything's Room Without	
2025	"Liking"	—	The Noise of Say Anything's Room Without	
2025	"Sweet Things"	—	The Noise of Say Anything's Room Without	
2025	"He Cannot Say What is Right to You"	—	The Noise of Say Anything's Room Without	
2025	"Unfucked"	—	The Noise of Say Anything's Room Without	
2025	"Breaking News - Dead Methhead Died From Doing Meth"	—	The Noise of Say Anything's Room Without	
2025	"A Wake, A Mass"	—	The Noise of Say Anything's Room Without	"—" denotes singles that did not chart.

== Music videos ==
Year	Title	Album	Director
2006	"Alive with the Glory of Love"	...Is a Real Boy	Kevin Kerslake
2007	"Wow, I Can Get Sexual Too"	...Was a Real Boy	Shane Drake
2007	"Baby Girl, I'm a Blur"	In Defense of the Genre	Wayne Isham
2008	"Shiksa (Girlfriend)"	In Defense of the Genre	
2009	"Hate Everyone"	Say Anything	The Malloys
2012	"Say Anything"	Anarchy, My Dear	
2012	"Burn a Miracle"	Anarchy, My Dear	
2014	"Six Six Six"	Hebrews	Rylan Morris Scherer
2016	"Give a Damn"	I Don't Think It Is	Israel Anthem
2023	"Psyche!"	...Is Committed	Boy Wonder
2024	"Belt" (20th Anniversary)	...Is A Real Boy	
2025	"Death Dancing"	The Noise of Say Anything's Room Without	Sandy Weintraub
2025	"Fuckbuddy"	The Noise of Say Anything's Room Without	Sandy Weintraub
2025	"Maxie's Choice"	The Noise of Say Anything's Room Without	Sandy Weintraub
2025	"The Band 'The Used'"	The Noise of Say Anything's Room Without	Sandy Weintraub
2025	"Death by Throat"	The Noise of Say Anything's Room Without	Sandy Weintraub

== Other Appearances ==
Year	Song	Album	Label
2006	"The Man in Me" (Bob Dylan cover)	Paupers, Peasants, Princes & Kings: The Songs of Bob Dylan	Doghouse Records
2007	"Walk Through Hell" (Re-Recorded)	Alternative Press Play Volume 1: Back to School & Punk the Clock Volume III: Property of a Gentleman	Photo Finish Records
2007	"Woe" (Acoustic)	Punk Goes Acoustic 2	Fearless Records
2007	"Alive with the Glory of Love" (97X Green Room Session)	97x Green Room Volume 3	97X
2007	"Alive with the Glory of Love" (The Edge 103.9 Session)	The Edge 103.9 Acoustic Live & Rare 2007	The Edge 103.9 FM
2008	"I Got Your Money" (Ol' Dirty Bastard cover)	Punk Goes Crunk	Fearless Records

The song "I Got Your Money" was originally slated to appear on the album Yo!: Indie Rock Raps on Immortal Records, but the compilation was scrapped by the label before its slated 2007 release.

== Other songs ==
Most of the band's unreleased songs predate ...Is a Real Boy. Along with the band's demos and other above-listed songs, they are available to download from the band's online forum.

=== Baseball demos ===
- "Colorblind" (Rough Demo)
- "Sure, Baby... Hold Back" (Demo)
- "That's That" (Demo) (later retitled "That's That (Do What We Want)")

=== Dormroom demos ===
Most of Say Anything's unreleased songs from the set of tracks known as Dormroom Demos, were recorded by Max Bemis in his dorm room while at Sarah Lawrence College.

1. "For the Silent"
2. "Until the Bombs"
3. "All This Fashion"
4. "You Help Them" †
5. "Transylvanian" †
6. "Signal the Riflemen"
7. "The Great Awakening"
8. "A Boston Peace"
9. "The Keg Is Bleeding"
10. "By Tonight" †
11. "My Bare Hands"
12. "Try to Remember, Forget" †
13. "Certain Type of Genius"
14. "I Want to Know Your Plans" ‡
15. "Nudity"
16. "Dealer" (Safety In Numbers cover)

† Released as part of Menorah/Majora
‡ Released as part of Menorah/Majora and ...Is a Real Boy, the latter as a rerecording

=== ...Is a Real Boy demos ===
1. "Belt"
2. "The Writhing South"
3. "Alive with the Glory of Love"
4. "Yellow Cat (Slash) Red Cat"
5. "Tiny Portions, Artful Abortions" (later renamed "The Futile")
6. "An Orgy of Critics"
7. "Slowly, Through a Vector"
8. "Molly Conelly " (later renamed "Every Man Has a Molly")
9. "I Shall Grow" (later renamed "Chia-Like, I Shall Grow")
10. "Admit It!!!"

=== Florida demos ===
1. "But a Fleeting Illness"
2. "Spider Song" (later renamed "Spidersong")
3. "Woe (The Optimist)" (later renamed "Woe")

=== Vs. AIDS demos ===
The songs that would eventually make up ...Was a Real Boy were originally slated for release as a benefit album entitled Say Anything vs. AIDS, the proceeds from which would, appropriately enough, go to support AIDS research. The songs differ from their commercially released counterparts in that they had yet to be properly mastered, and that the titles for many songs were different. One song does not appear on the commercial release.

Track number	Old Title (if Applicable)	Title on ...Was a Real Boy
1		"Metal Now"
2	Purple Sky	"Most Beautiful Plague"
3	There's a Man Assigned to Me	"Total Revenge"
4		"It's a Metaphor, Fool"
5	"Wow, I Can Be Sexual"	"Wow, I Can Get Sexual Too"
6		"I Will Never Write an Obligatory Song About Being on the Road & Missing Someone"
7	"Don't Dance So Close to Me"	"Little Girls"
8	"You Don't See Me Right"	

=== Miscellaneous demos ===
- "Mystery Rash" (demo of "We Will Erase All Life on Earth but Us")
- "Treblinkah" (demo of "Alive with the Glory of Love")
- "The Man in Me" (demo of the Bob Dylan cover, featuring Chris Conley of Saves the Day)
- "Yellow Cat/Red Cat" (rough demo)
- "Thoughts on a Liberal Education" (rough demo)
- "But a Fleeting Illness" (Demo)
- "The Presidential Suite (Electric)" (acoustic demo of "The Presidential Suite")
- "The Great Awakening" (Possible early demo of 'spay me')

=== Non-demo unreleased songs ===
- "Jessie and My Whetstone" (Saves the Day cover)
- "Dammit" (blink-182 cover)
- "Joel on the Other Planets"
- "Thoughts on a Liberal Education"
- "The Presidential Suite (Acoustic)"
