= All My Friends Are Enemies: Early Rarities =

Compilation album by Say Anything
- Released: January 22, 2013
- Genre: Emo
- Length: 248:54
- Label: Equal Vision Records
- Producer: Max Bemis

Say Anything chronology
Anarchy, My Dear (2012)	All My Friends Are Enemies: Early Rarities (2013)	Hebrews (2014)

Professional ratings
Review scores
Source	Rating
AllMusic	3.5/5 stars

All My Friends Are Enemies: Early Rarities is a compilation album by the band Say Anything, released on January 22, 2013. It features all their music recorded before the release of their 2004 album ...Is a Real Boy.

== Track listing ==
Most songs recorded and produced by Max Bemis between the years 1999 and 2003, mostly in the Bemis household in Los Angeles California.

Baseball: An Album by Say Anything (2001)
No.	Title	Length
1.	"Colorblind"	3:37
2.	"Showdown at P-Town"	3:02
3.	"Into the Night"	3:48
4.	"All My Friends"	2:48
5.	"Ants in My Pants"	4:57
6.	"The Ocean Liner Incident"	2:39
7.	"Mackdaddy"	3:45
8.	"Shameless"	5:45
9.	"That's That (Do What We Want)"	3:23
10.	"Resounding"	4:19
11.	"Rats"	4:51
12.	"Manhattan"	4:44
13.	""Sure, Baby... Hold Back.""	4:37
14.	"The Last Great Punk Rock Song"	3:59
15.	"Where the Hurt Is/All Choked Up"	17:39

Menorah/Majora (2002) and the Doormroom Demos
No.	Title	Length
1.	"A Walk Through Hell"	3:28
2.	"You Help Them"	3:11
3.	"Try to Remember, Forget"	4:18
4.	"By Tonight"	3:59
5.	"Baseball, But Better"	3:17
6.	"I Am A Transylvanian"	4:18
7.	"I Want to Know Your Plans"	5:12
8.	"For the Silent"	3:26
9.	"All This Fashion"	3:25
10.	"Until the Bombs"	2:56
11.	"The Keg is Bleeding!"	2:56
12.	"Signal the Riflemen"	5:08
13.	"A Boston Peace"	3:17
14.	"The Great Awakening"	3:55
15.	"A Certain Type of Genius"	3:48
16.	"My Bare Hands"	2:59
17.	"Nudity"	3:43

Junior Varsity EP (2000) and other early rarities
No.	Title	Length
1.	"Baseball, But Better" (2012 Acoustic)	4:03
2.	"The Presidential Suite"	5:10
3.	"Thoughts on a Liberal Education"	3:18
4.	"A Boston Peace" (Brett Gurewitz Mix)	3:38
5.	"Consigliore"	4:57
6.	"Jessie and My Whetstone" (originally performed by Saves the Day)	2:05
7.	"The Last Great Punk Rock Song" (JV Version)	3:51
8.	"Dreaming Of Manhattan"	4:40
9.	"She Got Away"	3:30
10.	"High School Low"	4:28
11.	"All My Friends are Enemies"	2:44
12.	"Sappy"	4:33
13.	"Anti-Anti"	4:27

== Personnel ==
=== Say Anything ===
- Max Bemis - all the instruments except where noted
- Coby Linder - all live (non-synth) drums
- Michael Levin - bass on Junior Varsity, Baseball, "Jessie and My Whetstone" and "Consigliore"
- Evan Span - guitar on Junior Varsity and the guitar solo on "All My Friends" from Baseball
- Joe Doleman - saxophone on "Ants in My Pants" from Baseball
- Michael Auerbach - backup vocals on "Sappy"

=== Production ===
- Remastered by Ryan Smith at Sterling Sound in New York, NY
