= I Don't Think It Is =

Studio album by Say Anything
- Released: February 5, 2016
- Genre: Emo
- Length: 42:38
- Label: Equal Vision
- Producer: Max Bemis, Darren King, Will Yip

Say Anything chronology
Hebrews (2014)	I Don't Think It Is (2016)	Oliver Appropriate (2019)

I Don't Think It Is is the seventh full-length studio album by American rock band Say Anything.

== Release ==
On February 2, 2016, frontman Max Bemis sent out a message stating "You know what? We're gonna stream our whole new record and drop it on Friday. Enjoy. #IDontThinkItIs." The album was then available to be streamed through the Equal Vision Records YouTube channel. On February 5, the album was released to digital music retailers and other streaming services. In April and May 2017, the group went on co-headlining US tour with Bayside with support from Reggie and the Full Effect and Hot Rod Circuit. To promote the tour, Say Anything covered Bayside's "They're Not Horses, They're Unicorns", while Bayside covered Say Anything's "Night's Songs".

== Reception ==
I Don't Think It Is was met with polarizing reception from critics and fans alike. Sputnikmusic staff gave the album 3.5 out of 5, elaborating that while the album was "not as initially rewarding as his typical work, the constant energy mixed with the ‘rough around the edges’ approach will keep you coming back for more. In a way, Say Anything's latest surprise release is more compelling for what it represents than the actual music it contains." New Noise Magazine awarded the album 4.5 out of 5 stars, writing that the band's "grinding honesty and gritty passion bring to mind the days of …Is a Real Boy, but with more feedback and writing maturity."

== Track listing ==
All songs recorded by Say Anything.

No.	Title	Length
1.	"Give a Damn"	3:46
2.	"17 Coked Up Speeding" (featuring Dylan Mattheisen and Alex Kent)	3:37
3.	"Rum"	4:16
4.	"So Numb"	1:32
5.	"Goshua"	3:39
6.	"Jiminy"	3:09
7.	"Princess" (featuring Christian Holden, Zack Shaw, and Michelle Zauner)	2:27
8.	"The Bret Easton Ellis School of Witchcraft and Wizardry"	3:12
9.	"#Blessed" (featuring Parker Case, Sherri DuPree, Stacy King, and Christie DuPree)	3:17
10.	"Wire Mom"	3:51
11.	"Attaboy" (featuring Joshua Sultan, Sherri DuPree, Stacy King, and Christie DuPree)	7:13
12.	"Varicose Visage"	2:46
Total length:		41:17

Bonus tracks

No.	Title	Length
13.	"Slip"	2:35
14.	"Slit"	1:35
15.	"Slick"	1:38
16.	"Spit"	1:06

== Chart performance ==
Chart (2016)	Peak position
U.S. Billboard Independent Albums	22
U.S. Billboard Top Rock Albums	35

== Credits ==
According to the liner notes:

- Max Bemis – Vocals, Guitar, Bass guitar, Keys
- Darren King – Drums, Programming, Sampling, Keys, Guitar, Vocals
- Dylan Mattheisen – Guitars, Vocals
- Cody Votolato – Guitars, Keys
- Alex Kent – Bass guitar, Vocals
- Garron Dupree – Bass guitar
- Todd Gummerman – Keys, Samples

Additional Vocals:

- Sherri Dupree-Bemis
- Christian Holden
- Zack Shaw
- Michelle Zauner
- Stacy King
- Christie Dupree
- Kayla Dupree
- Joshua Sultan
- Parker Case
- Jon Herroon

Production:

- Produced by Darren King and Max Bemis
- Engineered by Darren King
- Additional Pro-Tools engineering by Collin Dupree
- Mixed by Will Yip with Vince Rattiat 4 Recording
- Mastered by Ryan Smith at Sterling Sound
