= Anarchy, My Dear =

Studio album by Say Anything
- Released: March 13, 2012
- Genre: Emo, pop punk
- Length: 48:27
- Label: Equal Vision
- Producer: Tim O'Heir

Say Anything chronology
Say Anything (2009)	Anarchy, My Dear (2012)	All My Friends Are Enemies: Early Rarities (2013)

Singles from Anarchy, My Dear
- 1. "Burn A Miracle" Released: December 20, 2011; 2. "Say Anything" Released: January 31, 2012; 3. "Overbiter" Released: September 11, 2012

Anarchy, My Dear is the fifth studio album by American alternative rock band Say Anything. It was released on March 13, 2012 through Equal Vision Records. It was their last album until ...Is Committed with drummer Coby Linder, who left the band in December 2012.

== Background ==
On July 13, 2011, vocalist Max Bemis announced that Say Anything had been signed to independent label Equal Vision Records. They recorded Anarchy, My Dear from August 2011 to the end of September 2011 with ...Is a Real Boy producer, Tim O'Heir. Explaining the album's theme, Bemis said,

Anarchy, My Dear is our first attempt to write a true ‘punk’ record; thematically speaking, it’s a collection of songs about subverting society and destroying the boundaries humankind has placed upon ourselves both physically and in our minds. Coincidentally, it also happens to be the first record we’ve made in years where we had total freedom to explore our ‘edgier’ side and present a raw picture of what the band is truly about onstage.

== Artwork ==
"We thought we could best represent what the album means by using the symbolism of a burning flag stitched onto an actual flag. The image represents a championing of the ’cause’ of struggling against the rules and regulations that dictate our thinking.”

== Release ==
On December 19, 2011 Say Anything streamed their first single from the album called "Burn a Miracle." The track was officially released the following day to digital music retailers. On January 10, 2012 the album's track listing was revealed.

On February 4, 2012 the band released the second single from the album entitled "Say Anything". The song impacted radio on February 28, 2012. "Overbiter" impacted radio on September 11, 2012.

== Reception ==
Professional ratings
Aggregate scores
Source	Rating
Metacritic	66/100
Review scores
Source	Rating
AbsolutePunk	85%
AllMusic	3.5/5 stars
Alternative Press	3.5/5 stars
American Songwriter	3.5/5 stars
The A.V. Club	B−
Consequence of Sound	F
Rock Sound	8/10
Slant Magazine	2.5/5 stars
Spin	5/10
Sputnikmusic	1/5

Anarchy, My Dear polarized critics, but received a 66 out of 100 on Metacritic, indicating generally favorable reviews. AbsolutePunk gave the album an 85%, writing that the record promises "anything could happen at anytime, and Bemis and company do their very best to shake up what has been expected from them as a band." Entertainment Weekly was positive, noting that "Like a good long-distance run, Anarchy rewards with bursts of sonic endorphins." Alternative Press complimented Sherri Dupree-Bemis' presence on the album, highlighting her contributions to a "loose, lively, fun record" and awarding the album 3.5 out of 5 stars. In a mixed review, The A.V. Club wrote that Bemis "padded Anarchy with lushness, delicacy, and nuance. The problem is, Bemis' nuance screeches louder than distortion."

== Track listing ==
No.	Title	Length
1.	"Burn a Miracle"	3:54
2.	"Say Anything"	3:02
3.	"Night's Song"	3:44
4.	"Admit It Again"	4:13
5.	"So Good"	4:29
6.	"Sheep"	2:55
7.	"Peace Out"	5:17
8.	"Overbiter"	3:27
9.	"Of Steel"	4:10
10.	"Anarchy, My Dear"	5:43
11.	"The Stephen Hawking"	7:39
12.	"Here's to You, Blue Eyes" (bonus track)	3:51
Total length:		48:28

iTunes bonus tracks
No.	Title	Length
12.	"Their Notions"	4:04
13.	"So Good (Demo)"	3:41
14.	"The Making of Anarchy, My Dear (Video)"	7:38
