= Max Bemis and the Painful Splits =

- Genres: Alternative rock
- Years active: 2010–present

Max Bemis and the Painful Splits is a side project created by Say Anything's lead singer Max Bemis in September 2010. He has recorded six albums.

== Not a solo project ==
Bemis himself denied that this was an official "solo project", called it a "low-key sort of release", and expected the first CD to be the first of a series of such projects under varying band names.

== Discography ==
- Max Bemis and the Painful Splits
- Max Bemis and the Painful Splits 2
- The Painful Splits Destroy
- The Painful Splits Are Multiplying
- Max Bemis and The Painful Splits play "...is a Real Boy" ACOUSTIC
- Max Bemis and The Painful Splits Stripped Down
- The Painful Splits Wins
