= Silly Game =

Silly Game may refer to:

- "Silly Games", a song written by Dennis Bovell which was first released in 1979 by Janet Kay.
- "Silly Game", a song by Two Tongues from Two Tongues (album) 2009
- "Silly Game", a song by Prince
