= Oliver Appropriate =

Studio album by Say Anything
- Released: January 25, 2019
- Genre: Alternative rock; folk rock; pop-punk
- Length: 34:05
- Label: Dine Alone
- Producer: Will Yip

Say Anything chronology
I Don't Think It Is (2016)	Oliver Appropriate (2019)	...Is Committed (2024)

Singles from Oliver Appropriate
- 1. "Daze" Released: August 17, 2018; 2. "Pink Snot" Released: September 21, 2018; 3. "It's a Process" Released: October 26, 2018; 4. "Send You Off" Released: November 30, 2018

Oliver Appropriate is the eighth studio album by American rock band Say Anything released on January 25, 2019, via Dine Alone Records. The album is a concept album and purported sequel to the band's second full-length album, ...Is a Real Boy, which follows the narrator of said album and his struggles with sexuality.

== Background ==
Following the anniversary tour for In Defense of the Genre, the band announced their signing to Dine Alone Records and that they were working with Will Yip on a new LP. On August 16, 2018, frontman Max Bemis released a 10-page PDF statement in which he announced plans to end the band and to release an eighth and possibly final album with no supporting tour. The origin of the album came about after Bemis discovered the Indie rock band Museum Mouth through their third studio album "Alex I Am Nothing." Bemis connected with the album's concept of a man's unrequited love of a straight guy. Through front-man, Karl Kuehn's, song-writing Bemis was inspired to create the character of Oliver as well as publicly coming out as bisexual.

== Concept ==
The character of "Oliver" is said by Bemis to be loosely based on himself. He is the singer of a burnt-out "emo/indie punk" band past their peak who cheats on his girlfriends and parties to the point of hurting himself and those around him. The album chronicles two days in Oliver's life starting with him waking up hungover, falling in love with a guy named Karl (based on Kuehn) and rejecting him due to being in denial about his own sexuality. After he loses his job on the second day he seeks out Karl who then rejects him, leading him to murder him and then drown himself tied to his corpse and a large stone.

== Critical reception ==
Professional ratings
Aggregate scores
Source	Rating
Metacritic	76/100
Review scores
Source	Rating
DIY	4/5 stars
Pitchfork	6.5/10

Oliver Appropriate received generally favorable reviews according to Metacritic, which assigns a normalized rating out reviews from mainstream publications. In a four-star review from Sarah Jamieson with DIY Magazine she said that "the band yet again manage to navigate the realms of pointedly apt social commentary with a razor sharp wit." She also said the album was a more intimate journey than "...Is a Real Boy" and that it is "flecked with tales of weakness and failure, beauty and humour."

Rob Mair from Upset Magazine described the album is being "full of solid gold pop-songs" However, in a more mixed review, Arielle Gordon from Pitchfork described the record's plotline as "muddied and morally ambiguous at best". Loudwire named it one of the 50 best rock albums of 2019.

== Track listing ==
No.	Title	Writer(s)	Length
1.	"The Band Fuel"	Max Bemis	2:09
2.	"Daze"	Bemis	2:21
3.	"Pink Snot"	Bemis; Brianna Collins	2:49
4.	"Greased"	Bemis	2:05
5.	"Ew Jersey"	Bemis	2:56
6.	"Mouthbreather"	Bemis	2:06
7.	"When I'm Acid"	Bemis	1:37
8.	"Captive Audience"	Bemis	1:31
9.	"Your Father"	Karl Kuehn	1:46
10.	"Send You Off"	Bemis	2:28
11.	"Fired"	Bemis	1:07
12.	"It's a Process"	Bemis	3:23
13.	"The Hardest"	Bemis	2:39
14.	"Sediment"	Bemis	5:15
Total length:			34:05

== Personnel ==
According to AllMusic.

- Max Bemis - lead vocals, guitar, keyboards, bass
- Karl Kuehn - drums, vocals
- Will Yip - bass, drums, engineering, mastering, mixing, percussion, producer, programming
- Sherri DuPree - vocals
- Brianna Collins - vocals
- Coraline Bemis - vocals
- Lucy Bemis - vocals
- Jonathan Simmons - vocals
- Justin Anstotz - assistant engineer
- Phillip Odom - assistant engineer
- Vince Ratti - mixing

== Chart performance ==
Chart (2019)	Peak position
U.S. Billboard Independent Albums	14
U.S. Billboard Top Album Sales	97
