= Say Anything (album) =

Studio album by Say Anything
- Released: November 3, 2009
- Recorded: 2009
- Genres: Pop punk, emo, alternative rock
- Length: 46:12
- Label: RCA
- Producer: Neal Avron

Say Anything chronology
In Defense of the Genre (2007)	Say Anything (2009)	Anarchy, My Dear (2012)

Singles from Say Anything
- 1. "Hate Everyone" Released: August 25, 2009; 2. "Do Better"

Say Anything is the fourth full-length studio album by American rock band Say Anything.

== Background and recording ==
In late 2007, vocalist Max Bemis and drummer Coby Linder worked with Saves the Day vocalist-guitarist Chris Conley and guitarist David Soloway for the side project Two Tongues. In an online chat with fans on March 14, 2008, Max Bemis stated that the band has plans to record a new record called This Is Forever. He said it will be "about God and how we relate to him." AbsolutePunk reported on August 1, 2008, that J Records "picked up the option for Say Anything's next release." In November, alongside the announcement of Two Tongues' debut album, it was revealed that Say Anything was working on their next album, which would be released in 2009. On November 10, Bemis announced that the focus of the fourth album changed and the new record would be self-titled. He noted that the album, which was to be released in 2009, will ask "what the point of all of it was."

Though Bemis has explained that he was very proud of In Defense of the Genre, he described it as being more of an "homage to sort of a lot of the bands that we liked and, like, a style that we respected." He then explained that the new album would be "more concise and would be a bit more original, I want to say, and sort of pop out like ...Is a Real Boy did." He also explained that this CD has both the catchiest and most mature songs they've ever recorded and called it a "step forward."

In February and March 2009, the band toured Australia as part of the Soundwave festival. During a concert at the College of Saint Rose in Albany, New York, on April 25, 2009, Max Bemis proclaimed to the crowd that the newest album titled Say Anything was complete, and would be released "early summer", after stating that he was married two weeks prior to the event on April 4, 2009.

According to Say Anything's In Studio website, on May 21, 2009, Bemis posted a blog entry stating "I just wanted to let you guys know we’re done recording our new record, entitled "Say Anything", and we’re moving into the mixing phase. It should be out this fall. This record is kind of a new start, or at least a new phase in the Say Anything story."

== Release ==
Max Bemis confirmed through Twitter, on June 21, that the first single from the album will be "Hate Everyone". The single was released on August 25. On September 15, 2009, the album's artwork was posted online, and a music video was released for "Hate Everyone". That same day, the song was released to radio. On October 15, 2009, "Eloise" was posted on the band's Myspace profile.

The second single from the album was "Do Better." On September 15, 2009 the song "Property" from the upcoming album was made available to fans who signed up for the Say Anything official mailing list on the band's official website. After originally being scheduled to be released on October 13, 2009, it was delayed to November 3 through RCA Records. Say Anything frontman Max Bemis posted a blog entry on the band's official site on July 30 announcing its release, and said the album "literally defines everything about the band we've built so far." The complete album was uploaded to the band's Myspace page on October 29, 2009. Max Bemis stated on his Twitter that the next single from the album would be "Do Better" and that Say Anything will debut their live performance of "Do Better" on the Angels and Airwaves Spring Tour 2010. "Do Better" debuted on April 5, 2010 at The Warfield in San Francisco.

== Reception ==
Professional ratings
Aggregate scores
Source	Rating
Metacritic	76/100
Review scores
Source	Rating
AbsolutePunk	87%
AllMusic	4/5 stars
PopMatters	8/10 stars

Say Anything was given a metascore of 76 on aggregator Metacritic, from 8 critics it was rated as receiving generally favorable reviews.

A review from Sputnikmusic gave the album a 4.5/5 stars stating: "Pretty much, Say Anything offers more for fans and opens up the Say Anything sound for new ‘users’ to come and enjoy."

The album debuted at number 25 on the Billboard 200, Say Anything's highest charting record to date.

== Track listing ==
All lyrics are written by Max Bemis; all music is composed by Say Anything.

No.	Title	Length
1.	"Fed to Death"	1:36
2.	"Hate Everyone"	3:13
3.	"Do Better"	3:53
4.	"Less Cute"	3:03
5.	"Eloise"	3:47
6.	"Mara and Me"	3:52
7.	"Crush'd"	4:25
8.	"She Won't Follow You"	2:43
9.	"Cemetery"	3:56
10.	"Property"	4:11
11.	"Death for My Birthday"	4:03
12.	"Young Dumb and Stung"	3:25
13.	"Ahhh... Men"	4:05

=== Bonus tracks ===
No.	Title	Length
14.	"Narcissus"	3:32
15.	"I Love You More Than I Hate My Period"	3:33
16.	"I Could Be President"	2:20
17.	"No Games (Truth Serum)"	3:18

== Deluxe edition ==
- Double Vinyl Gatefold LP
- 3-D Poster w/ Glasses
- 13 Track CD/MP3 Download
- 9 Track Demo CD
- T-Shirt & Badge
- "Hate Everyone" Lyrics Sheet
- Guitar Pick Card
- Iron-On Decal

=== Say Anything's Secret Origin ===
No.	Title	Length
1.	"Fed to Death (Demo)"	1:39
2.	"Hate Everyone (Demo)"	3:15
3.	"Eloise (Demo)"	3:34
4.	"She Won't Follow You (Demo)"	2:24
5.	"Cemetery (Demo)"	3:49
6.	"Property (Demo)"	3:38
7.	"Death for My Birthday (Demo)"	4:11
8.	"Young Dumb and Stung (Demo)"	2:53
9.	"Ahhh... Men (Demo)"	3:22
