= Baby Girl =

Baby Girl or Babygirl may refer to:

== Albums ==
- Baby Girl (album), a 2007 album May J

== Songs ==
- "Baby Girl" (Sugarland song), 2004
- "Baby Girl" (Jim Jones song), 2005

== Film ==
- Babygirl, a 2024 American erotic thriller directed by Halina Reijn.
- Baby Girl (film), a 2026 Indian thriller directed by Arun Varma.

== See also ==
- "Baby Girl, I'm a Blur", a 2007 song by Say Anything
