= JamisonParker =

American emo band

Background information
- Origin: Orange County, California, U.S.
- Genres: Emo
- Years active: 2003–2005
- Label: Interscope
- Past members: Jamison Covington; Parker Case; Ted Vega; Jarrod Alexander; Joseph Assef; Jon-Michael Herrmann; BJ Lightvoet; Hunter

JamisonParker was an American emo duo in the early to mid-2000s, consisting of singer/guitarist Jamison Covington and guitarist/bassist/drummer Parker Case. While active, they released an EP titled Notes & Photographs (2003) and an album titled Sleepwalker (2005), and played over 200 concerts across the United States.

== History ==
Growing up in the small town of Guthrie, Kentucky and working at a Piggly Wiggly supermarket, singer/guitarist Jamison Covington realized he would not be able to find his musical fulfillment within the boundaries of his hometown. In 2002, he moved to Orange County, California, but soon learned that building a career in the music industry from scratch can be a hard and frustrating thing to do. Being a fan of the Orange County-based band Astoria, Covington was delighted when, a mere week before his return to Kentucky, he was introduced to their drummer Parker Case through mutual friends. Case and Covington kept in touch, exchanging song ideas via mail for about eight months, until Covington returned to California in early 2003.

On April 25, 2003, the duo went to Skate and Surf 2003 in Asbury Park, New Jersey, where they randomly performed so-called "guerilla sets" at merchandise booths and at a nearby hotel. The arising buzz around them was overheard by one of the festival's bookers, who immediately hired them to replace a band that had dropped out at the last minute. Having no time to think of a proper band name, the two combined their first names and played an all-acoustic set as JamisonParker. Their rudimentary but convincing performance quickly gained the attention of several record labels and finally landed them a recording contract with Interscope Records.

In August 2003, JamisonParker went into the studio to record a handful of songs for their debut EP titled Notes & Photographs, which was released on October 28, 2003. The release was supported by the band's first national tour with Straylight Run, followed by stints with Plain White T's, Motion City Soundtrack and Coheed and Cambria. The CD spawned a music video to the third track, "Your Song", which consisted of a collage of self-shot material, in analogy to the Polaroid pictures on the cover artwork for Notes & Photographs. In November, they support Hey Mercedes on their headlining US tour. While the buzz quieted down around the duo after January 2004, as they took most of the year off. In April 2004, the band performed at the Skate and Surf Festival. JamisonParker returned to the stage with newly written songs under their belt in February 2005. In the meantime, they had recorded their first full-length album.

In April and May 2005, they appeared at The Bamboozle and Flipside festivals. In June 2005, they appeared on the compilation album Punk Goes 80s with a cover version of Tears for Fears' "Everybody Wants to Rule the World". However, due to their busy schedule, they did not have the time to rent a proper studio. Instead, they recorded the entire song while on tour – a hotel room became their recording studio, their laptop served as their mixing console and a bathroom closet was turned into a vocal booth.

They went on a two-week tour with the Forecast and Fire When Ready. On July 12, 2005, their album Sleepwalker finally hit music store shelves. It was promoted with a two-week West Coast tour supporting the Rocket Summer, and then a two-month headlining tour in August and September 2005. From late October to late November, the band toured with June, The Juliana Theory, We Are the Fury and For the World.

While the demand for JamisonParker was at an all-time high, the band-internal chemistry decreased steadily, up to an incident where during a concert, Covington walked off the stage in the middle of the band's set, leaving Case behind. From there on, it all went downhill, with a continuous lack of enthusiasm until JamisonParker gave their final performance at Chain Reaction in Anaheim, California on November 5, 2005, and canceled the remainder of their scheduled tour dates with The Juliana Theory.

On November 8, 2005, Covington officially declared the disbandment of JamisonParker. In the announcement posted online, he made it clear that he and Case will not be collaborating again in the future. After the split, Covington formed the shoegazing band E for Explosion. His band's name was changed to Covington but again changed to E for Explosion. A debut EP titled Paper Flowers, was released on October 2, 2007. On May 20, 2008, E for Explosion released their debut album Reinventing the Heartbeat. Case announced that up until the release of his upcoming project I and the Universe's debut record, he will be touring as part of Say Anything. Case has ended up staying with the band since, though, and is counted as the second longest remaining member, behind original member Max Bemis.

== Discography ==
=== Albums ===
- Sleepwalker (2005)

=== EPs ===
- Notes & Photographs (2003)

=== Non-album tracks ===
- "Paper, Rock, Scissors (Acoustic)" – released on In Honor: A Compilation to Beat Cancer (2004)
- "Everybody Wants to Rule the World" – released on Punk Goes 80s (2005)
- "Anthem for the Broken Hearted" – Unreleased
- "Hold Your Breath" – Unreleased
