= Blacklist (EP) =

EP by Come and Rest
- Released: May 12, 2015
- Genre: Christian metal, metalcore, post-hardcore
- Length: 19:11
- Label: Independent

Come and Rest chronology
Royal Blood (2013)	Blacklist (2015)

Blacklist is the second extended play from Come and Rest. The band independently released the album on May 12, 2015.

== Critical reception ==
Professional ratings
Review scores
Source	Rating
Exclaim!	5/10
HM Magazine	3.5/5 stars
Indie Vision Music	4/5 stars
New Noise Magazine	4/5 stars
Substream Magazine	4/5 stars

Awarding the EP three and a half stars from HM Magazine, Darcy Rumble states, "Blacklist isn’t a breakdown-heavy hardcore album, and also avoids falling into too many metalcore clichés. Instead, they land in the middle in a pleasing hybrid filled with metal riffs, chunky guitars, and killer drum work that give each song a personality of its own." Bradley Zorgdrager, rating the EP a five out of ten at Exclaim!, writes, "Unfortunately, there's a glass ceiling that the band can't seem to shatter on Blacklist." Giving the EP four stars for New Noise Magazine, Shrum says, "Despite its being an EP, Blacklist carries the weight and intensity of a full-length album." Brody Barbour, indicating in a four star review for the EP by Indie Vision Music, describes, "Come and Rest have crafted a great hardcore record. Blacklist has something for nearly everyone, be it in the form of diverse vocal delivery or hellish riffs, this album will be sure to emanate from metalheads speakers for some time to come." Signaling in a four stars review from Substream Magazine, Eric Spitz says, "All six tracks of Blacklist pack a pretty hard punch for the listener ... There’s something enjoyable for all fans of the metalcore/post-hardcore scene within Blacklist."

== Track listing ==
No.	Title	Length
1.	"Millenials"	4:05
2.	"Soapbox"	2:47
3.	"Feeding Crows (Evermore)"	3:13
4.	"Behind My Eyes"	3:58
5.	"Slowburn"	3:36
6.	"Dead Poets Society"	1:32
Total length:		19:11
