= Two Tongues =

American indie rock band

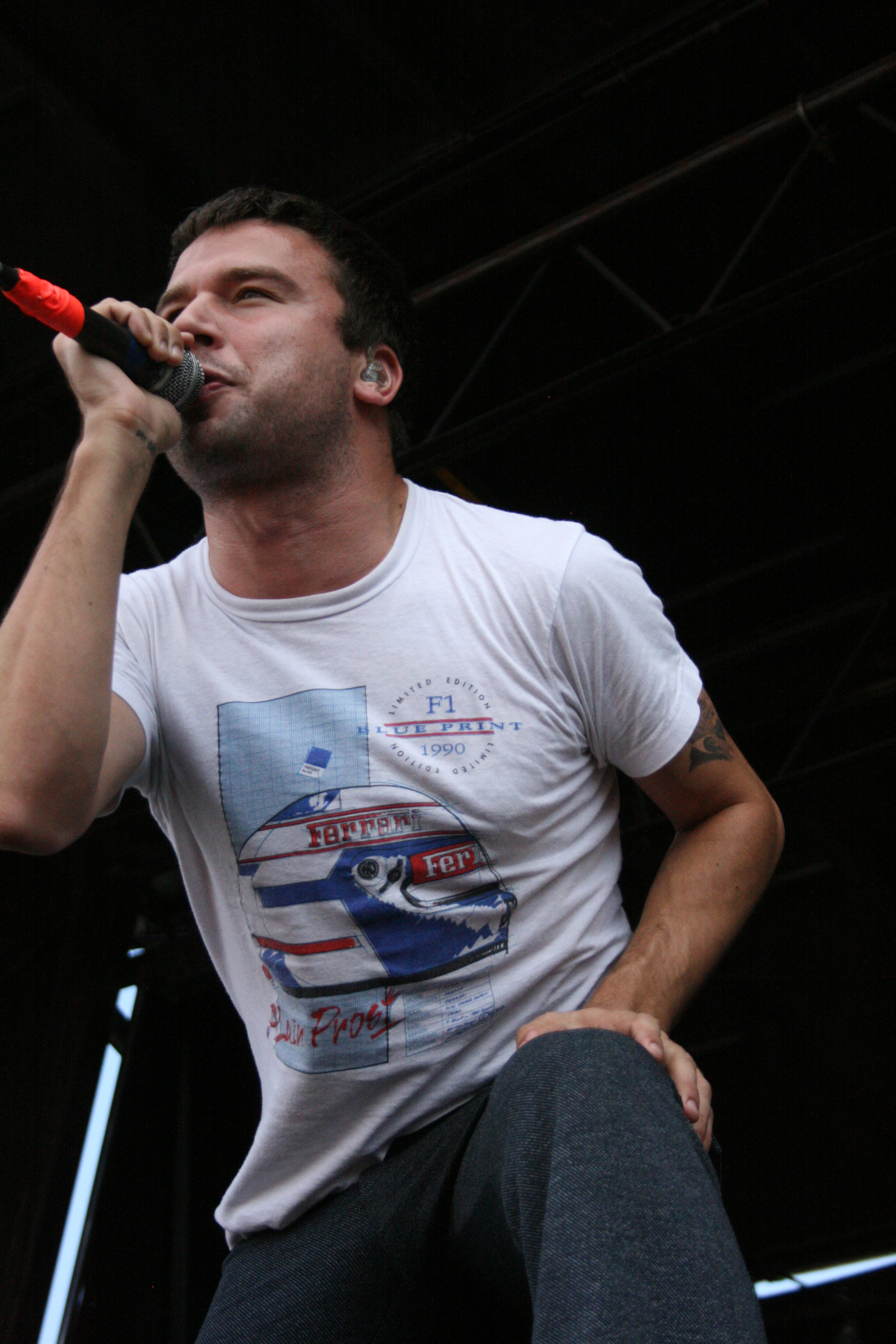
- Max Bemis performing in 2008

Background information
- Genres: Indie rock; emo; pop-punk
- Years active: 2008–present
- Labels: Vagrant; Equal Vision; Rory
- Members: Chris Conley; Max Bemis; David Soloway; Coby Linder

Two Tongues is an American indie rock side project, or supergroup founded in 2008, consisting of members of Say Anything (Max Bemis and Coby Linder) and Saves the Day (Chris Conley), along with David Soloway, a former guitarist with Saves the Day.

== History ==
Before forming Two Tongues, Bemis, Conley and Linder had collaborated on a cover version of Bob Dylan's "The Man In Me" for the compilation album Paupers, Peasants, Princes & Kings: The Songs of Bob Dylan, released by Doghouse Records in 2006. Bemis asked Conley about potentially doing an album together; Conley responded positively by saying "I would do it with no one else, nothing could be more epic!" They subsequently recorded an album in January 2008.

The resulting album, Two Tongues, was scheduled to be released in summer 2008, but was delayed for unspecified reasons. The album was eventually released on February 3, 2009, through Vagrant Records. The thirteen-track album was self-produced and recorded at Electric Ladybug studios in Durham, California.

In fall 2010, Two Tongues made their first performances as a surprise in the middle of Say Anything's set each night of the Motion City Soundtrack, Say Anything and Saves the Day tour. They performed the song "Crawl". Arun Bali (current guitarist of Saves the Day) played guitar, Kenny Vasoli (of The Starting Line and Person L) played bass guitar, Jake Turner (of Say Anything) played guitar, Coby Linder played drums and Conley and Bemis sang.

Conley confirmed that there would be a second Two Tongues album in 2012.

On July 26, 2016, Conley announced the first ever Two Tongues tour beginning fall 2016, along with a fall release of their second album, Two Tongues Two. On October 10, 2016, Say Anything made an announcement on their website that the tour would be cancelled, "due to unforeseen circumstances." The post indicated the group would be, "playing shows in the future," but did not indicate a time-frame for this.

In light of the allegations against Conley, as of 2023, Max says he still would like to collaborate with him.

== Discography ==
Studio albums

- Two Tongues (2009)
- Two Tongues Two (2016)

== Members ==
- Max Bemis – vocals, guitar
- Chris Conley – vocals, guitar
- David Soloway – bass guitar
- Coby Linder – drums
