= ...Is Committed =

Studio album by Say Anything
- Released: May 24, 2024
- Genres: Alternative rock; emo
- Length: 60:07
- Label: Dine Alone
- Producers: Brad Wood, Max Bemis, Kyle Black, Matthew Huber

Say Anything chronology
| Oliver Appropriate (2019) | ...Is Committed (2024) | The Noise Of Say Anything's Room Without... (2025) |

Singles from ...Is Committed
- 1. "Psyche!" Released: April 28, 2023; 2. "Are You (In) There?" Released: August 10, 2023; 3. "Carrie & Lowell & Cody (Pendent)" Released: October 13, 2023; 4. "I, Vibrator" Released: March 21, 2024; 5. "On Cum" Released: April 25, 2024

...Is Committed is the ninth studio album by American rock band Say Anything released on May 24, 2024, via Dine Alone Records.

== Background ==
In April 2023, Bemis posted a press release via the website Chorus.FM, detailing a reunion and new music, as well as announcing an all-new line-up consisting of himself, Case, Kent, co-founder Coby Linder (who previously left in 2012), and the addition of Fred Mascherino (Taking Back Sunday, The Color Fred) and Brian Warren (Weatherbox). A new single, "Psyche!", was released on April 28. On March 21, 2024, the band announced via Instagram that their ninth studio album, titled ...Is Committed, would be released digitally on May 24 through Dine Alone Records. It was produced by Max Bemis and In Defense of the Genre's Brad Wood. The album title, ...Is Committed, intentionally references the band's 2004 breakthrough album ...Is a Real Boy.

== Critical reception ==
Professional ratings
Review scores
| Source | Rating |
|---|---|
| Sputnikmusic | 3/5 stars |
| Riff Magazine | 7/10 |
| New Noise Magazine | 4.5/5 stars |

...Is Committed received mixed reviews from music critics. Sputnikmusic reviewer Caleb Robinson gave the album a 3 out of 5, saying "has some of the worst, most cringe-inducing lyrics I've ever heard" yet "the album is brimming with energy, and the band (more specifically, Max Bemis) has proven that they're still capable of writing earworms." Riff Magazine gave it a 7 out of 10, writing "Bemis' brashness may not be for everyone, but longtime fans of the band will likely find a familiar sound." New Noise Magazine gave it a 4.5 out of 5, calling it "an anthemic explosion that will not stop until you hear everything he has to say."

== Track listing ==
All tracks are written by Max Bemis.

| No. | Title | Length |
|---|---|---|
| 1. | "Be, Children (Introduction to the Reunion Record)" | 3:43 |
| 2. | "On Cum" | 5:25 |
| 3. | "Auto-Harmonic Ass Fixation" | 2:48 |
| 4. | "I, Vibrator" | 4:36 |
| 5. | "Psyche!" | 5:34 |
| 6. | "We Say Grace in This Goddamn Band, Mister!" | 3:37 |
| 7. | "Carrie & Lowell & Cody (Pendent)" | 3:54 |
| 8. | "Are You (In) There?" | 4:04 |
| 9. | "Say Anything, Collectively, Made Love to Your God" | 4:17 |
| 10. | "Daisy's" | 4:11 |
| 11. | "Woman Song" | 9:10 |
| 12. | "Fan Fiction" | 8:48 |
| Total length: | | 60:07 |

== Personnel ==
Adapted from the liner notes:

- Max Bemis – vocals, guitar, programming; producer; additional vocal production; lyrics
- Alexander Kent – bass, vocals
- Coby Linder – drums, vocals
- Brian Warren – guitar, vocals
- Fred Mascherino – guitar, vocals
- Parker Case – keyboards, programming, vocals

Additional musicians

- Sherri Dupree-Bemis – additional vocals

Production

- Max Bemis – producer (all tracks except noted), additional vocal production
- Brad Wood – producer (all tracks except noted), mixing (all tracks except "Psyche!")
- Kyle Black – producer on "Are You (In) There?"
- Matthew Huber – producer and mixer on "Psyche!"
- Zachary Miligan – drums tracking
- Conor Sisk – bass tracking at Rainshow Recording
- Jon Isenhower – bass tracking at Salish Sound
- Dave Kutch – mastering at Mastering Palace

Artwork

- Justin Ellsworth – artwork
