= Rory Records =

- Parent company: Equal Vision Records
- Founded: 2012
- Founder: Max Bemis
- Distributor: RED Distribution
- Genre: Various
- Country of origin: U.S.
- Official website: www.rory-records.com

Rory Records is an independent record label founded in 2012 by Max Bemis (of Say Anything) as an imprint of Equal Vision Records. Rory Records releases are distributed through Equal Vision's distributor RED Distribution.

== Roster ==
- Matt Pryor
- Merriment
- Museum Mouth
- Perma
- Pretty & Nice
- Rising Fawn
- Saves the Day
- Say Anything
- Two Tongues

== Former ==
- TALLHART (Disbanded 2014)
- XO

== See also ==
- Equal Vision Records
- List of record labels
