= Baby Girl, I'm a Blur =

Single by Say Anything

from the album In Defense of the Genre
- Released: October 2, 2007
- Genre: Electronic rock, alternative dance, indie rock
- Length: 4:19
- Label: Doghouse, J
- Songwriters: Max Bemis, Coby Linder and Alex Kent
- Producer: Brad Wood

Say Anything singles chronology
"Wow, I Can Get Sexual Too" (2007)	"Baby Girl, I'm a Blur" (2007)	"Shiksa (Girlfriend)" (2008)

"Baby Girl, I'm a Blur" is the first single from Say Anything's album, In Defense of the Genre. It was released on iTunes on October 2, 2007. The song impacted radio on November 6. This song was written in Central Park by Max Bemis. He was quoted as saying

[I] fell in love with the melody and always envisioned it was like a Nine Inch Nails-y affair, with a pulsing drum beat.

A video for the song was released on November 12, 2007.

The song was used in the fourth episode of the American television series Breaking Bad entitled "Cancer Man".

== Video ==
The music video for "Baby Girl, I'm a Blur" is essentially a performance video. It features the band performing the song in a black room in front of a wall of square infrared images. Shots of the band alternate between infrared shots of a couple. As the song progresses, the band starts to smash their instruments.

The video was an "Unleashed" video on MTV2. It was premiered on November 12, 2007, and was directed by Wayne Isham. The video was also premiered on mtvU the same day. The song was recently #1 on the MTV countdown, Elite 8.

== Chart positions ==
Chart	Peak position
U.S. Billboard Modern Rock Tracks	29
