= Come and Rest =

American metalcore band

- Also known as: C // R
- Origin: Atlanta, Georgia
- Genres: Metalcore, Christian metal, post-hardcore
- Years active: 2011–present
- Labels: Equal Vision Records
- Members: Dan Goehring; Josh Harmon; Noel Alejandro; Mitchell Garrett
- Website: facebook.com/comeandrest

Come and Rest, stylized C // R, are an American metalcore band from Atlanta, Georgia. The band started making music in 2011, with members, Dan Goehring, Josh Harmon, Noel Alejandro, and Mitchell Garrett. They have released two independently made extended plays, Royal Blood, in 2013, and, Blacklist, in 2015. The band's name is derived from a Bible verse.

== Background ==
Come and Rest is a metalcore band from Atlanta, Georgia. Their members at its inception, in June 2011, was Dan Goehring, Josh Harmon, Noel Alejandro, and Mitchell Garrett.

== Music history ==
The band commenced as a musical entity in 2011, with their first release, Royal Blood, an extended play, that released on February 18, 2013. They released another extended play, Blacklist, on May 12, 2015.

== Members ==
Current

- Dan Goehring
- Josh Harmon
- Noel Alejandro
- Mitchell Garrett

== Discography ==
EPs

- Royal Blood (February 18, 2013)
- Blacklist (May 12, 2015)
