= Do Better =

Do Better may refer to:

- "Do Better", a 2009 song by Say Anything from Say Anything
- "Do Better", a 2014 song by Chris Brown from X
- "Do Better", a 2019 song by Stormzy from Heavy Is the Head
- "Do Better", a 2020 song by Gunna from Wunna
