= Matthew Prior (disambiguation) =

Matthew Prior was a poet and diplomat.

Matthew Prior may also refer to:

- Matt Prior (born 1982), English cricketer
- Matt Prior (rugby league) (born 1987), Australian rugby league footballer

== See also ==
- Matthew Pryor (disambiguation)
