= Hebrews (album) =

Studio album by Say Anything
- Released: June 10, 2014
- Recorded: 2013–2014
- Genre: Alternative rock, indie rock, emo
- Length: 46:36
- Label: Equal Vision Records
- Producer: Max Bemis

Say Anything chronology
All My Friends Are Enemies: Early Rarities (2013)	Hebrews (2014)	I Don't Think It Is (2016)

Singles from Hebrews
- 1. "Six Six Six" Released: April 24, 2014; 2. "Judas Decapitation" Released: May 15, 2014

Professional ratings
Review scores
Source	Rating
Punknews.org	3.5/5 stars

Hebrews is the sixth full-length studio album by American rock band Say Anything. On March 25, the band announced via their label, Equal Vision Records' blog that their new record entitled Hebrews, titled after front-man Max Bemis's Jewish lineage, would be released on June 10, 2014. Early on in the recording process, it was announced that the album would be self-produced by Bemis, and engineered by Garron DuPree. On April 24, the first single from the album was released, titled "Six Six Six" via billboard.com, along with more details concerning the ambitious production and release of the upcoming record. Most notably, front-man Max Bemis confessed that the forthcoming album features production that had been unprecedented to the band - the album features no guitars, and instead replaces traditional guitar-based riffs with orchestral string arrangements while maintaining the punk-influenced drive that has been attributed to the band in the past.

"Judas Decapitation" was released to radio on May 19, 2014. In October, the group went on a headlining Australian tour. Chris Conley of Saves the Day served as guitarist and backing vocalist.

== Background ==
In an interview with Billboard magazine in December 2013, Bemis spoke about the new record, divulging that the album was "about 80 percent done." Furthermore, Bemis spoke covertly about the new record, claiming it to be "kind of a big shift for us in certain ways...some really crazy arrangements."

Bemis went on to speak of the recording process with engineer Garron DuPree, saying they "have been able to spread out the recording over the course of five months or so. It's definitely giving me a lot of time to tastefully arrange things that I wouldn't have necessarily had the time to do..."

The record features several guest appearances by the singers of various indie rock, punk rock and emo bands: Andy Hull of Manchester Orchestra, Aaron Weiss of mewithoutyou, Tom DeLonge of Blink 182 and Angels & Airwaves, Keith Buckley of Every Time I Die, Matt Pryor of The Get Up Kids and Reggie and the Full Effect, Chris Conley of Saves the Day, Gareth and Kim Campesinos of Los Campesinos!, Bob Nanna of Braid, Jon Simmons of Balance and Composure, Brian Sella of The Front Bottoms and Jeremy Bolm of Touché Amoré. Additionally, the record features all the members of the band Eisley: Bemis' wife, Sherri DuPree-Bemis, her sisters Stacy and Chauntelle, brother Weston and cousin Garron. Bemis' brother-in-law, Mutemath drummer Darren King, also appears on the record.

== Reception ==
Hebrews received an 83 out of 100 on Metacritic, indicating universal acclaim. Absolutepunk awarded the album an 88%, noting that it "isn't the return to form listeners may have been expecting from Say Anything; instead it's something entirely better." Stephanie Vaughan of Substream Magazine was highly positive, commending the album on pushing boundaries both lyrically and aesthetically.

== Track listing ==
All songs recorded by Say Anything.

No.	Title	Length
1.	"John McClane" (featuring Chris Conley and Matt Pryor)	3:34
2.	"Six Six Six" (featuring Sherri DuPree-Bemis, Andy Hull and Jon Simmons)	4:40
3.	"Judas Decapitation" (featuring Gareth and Kim Campesinos)	3:25
4.	"Kall Me Kubrick" (featuring Chauntelle DuPree- D'Agostino)	4:18
5.	"My Greatest Fear Is Splendid" (featuring Keith Buckley)	3:24
6.	"Hebrews" (featuring Brian Sella)	4:08
7.	"Push" (featuring Aaron Weiss)	3:46
8.	"The Shape of Love to Come" (featuring Sherri DuPree-Bemis)	5:10
9.	"Boyd" (featuring Sherri DuPree-Bemis)	2:15
10.	"A Look" (featuring Stacy King and Bob Nanna)	3:56
11.	"Lost My Touch" (featuring Christie DuPree and Jeremy Bolm)	4:37
12.	"Nibble Nibble" (featuring Tom DeLonge and Sherri DuPree-Bemis)	3:23
Total length:		46:36

== Personnel ==
Say Anything

- Max Bemis - Vocals, songwriting & arrangement
- Reed Murray - Drums
- Garron DuPree - Bass Guitar, upright bass

Guest Musicians

- Jeremy Larson - Cello, viola, violin
- Sarah Reno - French Horn
- Joel Adair - Trumpet
- Sam Reyes - Tuba
- Unknown - Fiddle
- Darren King - Drums
- Weston DuPree - Drums

Guest Vocalists

- Jeremy Bolm
- Keith Buckley
- Gareth Campesinos
- Kim Campesinos
- Chris Conley
- Tom DeLonge
- Chauntelle DuPree-D'Agostino
- Christie DuPree
- Sherri DuPree-Bemis
- Andy Hull
- Stacy King
- Bob Nanna
- Matt Pryor
- Brian Sella
- Jon Simmons
- Aaron Weiss

Production

- Max Bemis - Producer
- Garron DuPree - Engineer
- Brad Wood - Mix
- Emily Lazar - Mastering
