= In Defense of the Genre =

In Defense of The Genre

Studio album by Say Anything
- Released: October 23, 2007
- Recorded: 2007
- Studios: Electric Lady, New York; Seagrass, California
- Genres: Pop punk; emo; alternative rock
- Length: 89:21
- Label: J
- Producer: Brad Wood

Say Anything chronology
...Is a Real Boy (2004)	In Defense of The Genre (2007)	Say Anything (2009)

Singles from In Defense of the Genre
- 1. "Baby Girl, I'm a Blur" Released: October 2, 2007; 2. "Shiksa (Girlfriend)" Released: 2008; 3. "Skinny, Mean Man" Released: 2008; 4. "Spores" Released: 2008

In Defense of The Genre is the third studio album by American rock band Say Anything. The album artwork was provided by Jeff Smith, an artist primarily known for his work on the Bone comic series.

== Background and production ==
Writing and plans for In Defense of the Genre began in March 2006 during Say Anything's extensive touring and promotion for the reissue of their previous effort, …Is a Real Boy. In October and November 2006, they embarked on a headlining US tour, with support from MewithoutYou and Piebald, which led into a short UK tour with New Found Glory that lasted until December 2006. Recording was held at Electric Lady Studios in New York City, and at Seagrass Studios in Valley Village, California, with producer and engineer Brad Wood, between January and March 2007. Wood was assisted by Noah Goldstein at Electric Lady; additional recordings were made by Andy Jackson and Ross Petersen. Wood mixed the recordings, before the album was mastered by Emily Lazar at The Lodge in New York City, with assistance from Joe LaPorta, in March 2007. Despite this, the band were still recording into June 2007, by which point they were only two thirds of the way finished.

== Composition ==
Before the album was released, Bemis said it would deal with the "struggles with mental health offset by finding love for the first time". Max Bemis described in an interview that the record is more focused on "observations of other people", unlike ...Is a Real Boy's lyrical content revolving solely on Bemis and his problems. The record "picks up in my life where [...Is a Real Boy] left off because it is very autobiographical, even more so than the last record. Musically, it's different, more mature and somewhat more cohesive and poppy, but darker in a whole different way."

It's the story of being alone and losing my mind and then overcoming that event by learning to trust and let go of that anger and fall in love for the first time. It's also about losing that love and the confusion that entails after, and the nature of first love; discovering what you really want whether it be to give yourself totally to someone or explore the endless abyss and risk losing your mind again and that love.

— Bemis, on the concept of In Defense of the Genre

The album features 23 individual guest vocalists and musicians, including Gerard Way of My Chemical Romance, Pete Yorn, Anna Waronker, Adam Lazzara of Taking Back Sunday, Aaron Gillespie of Underoath and The Almost, Matt Skiba of Alkaline Trio, and Hayley Williams of Paramore. Additional instrumentation was handled by DJ Swamp and Casey Prestwood, who contributed on turntable and pedal steel guitar, respectively. The December issue of Alternative Press reported that Jesse Lacey of Brand New chose not to collaborate. In December 2007, Absolutepunk.net made a three-part video series showing an in-depth look at the recording of In Defense of the Genre.

== Release ==
In April and May 2007, Say Anything went on a co-headlining US tour with Saves the Day; the Almost, John Ralston, the Dear Hunter, and Manchester Orchestra supported on various dates. During the trek, the band appeared at The Bamboozle festival. In June, they appeared on Last Call with Carson Daly. On September 11, 2007, In Defense of the Genre was announced for release the following month. On September 18, 2007, the album's track listing and artwork were posted online. Until the album's release, "Skinny, Mean Man", "Shiksa", "People Like You Are Why People Like Me Exist", "Spores", and "Baby Girl, I'm a Blur" were posted on the band's Myspace and PureVolume profiles.

In Defense of the Genre was released on October 23 through J Records as a double disc album. In October and November, the group co-headlined the Myspace Music Tour with Hellogoodbye. They were supported by Polysics and Young Love. "Baby Girl, I'm a Blur" was released to radio on November 6. They ended the year with a tour of the United Kingdom in November and December 2007 with Hellogoodbye, Sherwood, and Go:Audio.

On January 29, 2008, the band performed on Last Call with Carson Daly. In February 2008, the band supported Thrice on their headlining tour of Canada and a few Midwest US shows. In March and April 2008, the band went on a headlining tour of the US with Manchester Orchestra, Biffy Clyro and Weatherbox as supporting acts. On April 10, a music video was released for "Shiksa (Girlfriend)". Between June and August, the band performed on the 2008 edition of Warped Tour. In February and March 2009, the band toured Australia as part of the Soundwave festival.

== Reception ==
Professional ratings
Aggregate scores
Source	Rating
Metacritic	79%
Review scores
Source	Rating
AbsolutePunk.net	(96%) link
Allmusic	link
Alternative Press	link
The A.V. Club	(B+) link
Blender	link
Entertainment Weekly	(A−) link
Kerrang!	4/5 stars
Spin	link
Sputnikmusic	link
Rolling Stone	link

In Defense of the Genre was well received by most critics, averaging a 79% on Metacritic. Entertainment Weekly gave the album an A-, noting that the album's "sonic twists almost always work". Alternative Press gave the album a 4.5/5 and stated that Max Bemis created an album musicians "more than twice his age could only hope to create." Blender, in a 4/5 review, called it a "mess" but an "exhilarating one."

In more mixed reviews, PopMatters noted that the wide variety of styles was a "gift and curse at the same time". Rolling Stone said "When Bemis is on... his songs are tuneful and invigorating."

It debuted at number 27 on the US Billboard 200 chart, selling 25,000 copies in its first week.

== Track listing ==
All music by Max Bemis, Jacob Linder and Alexander Kent. All lyrics by Bemis.

Disc one
No.	Title	Guest vocalist(s)	Length
1.	"Skinny, Mean Man"	Pete Yorn	3:33
2.	"No Soul" (contains a portion of the composition "Juicy Fruit", originally written by James Mtume; features DJ Swamp on turntables)	Anna Waronker	3:36
3.	"That Is Why"		4:13
4.	"Surgically Removing the Tracking Device"	Adam Lazzara, Fred Mascherino	2:30
5.	"This Is Fucking Ecstasy"	Anthony Raneri	2:39
6.	"The Church Channel"	Hayley Williams	3:04
7.	"Shiksa (Girlfriend)"	Caithlin De Marrais	3:38
8.	"Baby Girl, I'm a Blur"		4:19
9.	"Retarded in Love" (features Casey Prestwood on pedal steel guitar)	Chris Carrabba, Michael Auerbach	3:06
10.	"People Like You Are Why People Like Me Exist"	Trever Keith	3:28
11.	"Died a Jew"		2:29
12.	"An Insult to the Dead" (Additional arrangement by Joshua Sultan)		4:09
13.	"Sorry, Dudes. My Bad."	Chris Conley	2:43

Disc two
No.	Title	Guest vocalist(s)	Length
1.	"Spay Me"		3:13
2.	"In Defense of the Genre"	Gerard Way	4:02
3.	"The Truth Is, You Should Lie with Me"	Joshua Sultan	2:31
4.	"The Word You Wield"		3:50
5.	"Vexed"		2:39
6.	"About Falling"	Matt Skiba, Laura Kirsch	4:13
7.	"You're the Wanker, If Anyone Is"	Jordan Pundik, Chad Gilbert, Aaron Gillespie	3:22
8.	"Spores"		2:49
9.	"We Killed It"	Andy Jackson	1:53
10.	"Have at Thee!"		3:03
11.	"Hangover Song"	Anthony Green	0:58
12.	"Goodbye Young Tutor, You've Now Outgrown Me"		4:20
13.	"I Used to Have a Heart"		4:17
14.	"Plea"	Hayley Williams and Kenny Vasoli	4:31

== Personnel ==
Personnel per booklet.

Say Anything

- Max Bemis – lead vocals, keys, guitar, mandolin
- Jacob Linder – drums, percussion, backing vocals
- Alexander Kent – bass

Additional musicians

- Pete Yorn – vocals on "Skinny, Mean Man"
- Anna Waronker – vocals on "No Soul"
- DJ Swamp – DJ on "No Soul"
- Adam Lazzara – vocals on "Surgically Removing the Tracking Device"
- Fred Mascherino – vocals on "Surgically Removing the Tracking Device"
- Anthony Raneri – vocals on "This Is Fucking Ecstasy"
- Hayley Williams – vocals on "The Church Channel" and "Plea"
- Caithlin de Marrais – vocals on "Shiska (Girlfriend)"
- Chris Carrabba – vocals on "Retarded in Love"
- Michael Auerbach – vocals on "Retarded in Love"
- Casey Prestwood – pedal steel on "Retarded in Love"
- Trever Keith – vocals on "People Like You Are Why People Like Me Exist"
- Chris Conley – vocals on "Sorry, Dudes. My Bad"
- Gerard Way – vocals on "In Defense of the Genre"
- Joshua Sultan – vocals on "The Truth Is, You Should Lie with Me"
- Matt Skiba – vocals on "About Falling"
- Laura Kirsh – vocals on "About Falling"
- Jordan Pundik – vocals on "You're the Wanker, If Anyone Is"
- Chad Gilbert – vocals on "You're the Wanker, If Anyone Is"
- Aaron Gillespie – vocals on "You're the Wanker, If Anyone Is"
- Andy Jackson – vocals on "We Killed It"
- Anthony Green – vocals on "Hangover Song"
- Kenny Vasoli – vocals on "Plea"

Production and design

- Brad Wood – producer, engineer, mixing
- Noah Goldstein – assistant
- Andy Jackson – additional recordings
- Ross Petersen – additional recordings
- Emily Lazar – mastering
- Joe LaPorta – assistant
- Jeff Smith – illustration
- Josh Cheuse – art direction, design
- Frank Ockenfels – photography

Touring musicians

- Jake Turner – backing vocals, guitar
- Jeff Turner – backing vocals, guitar
- Parker Case – guitar, keyboards, backing vocals
