= Parker Case =

American musician and drummer

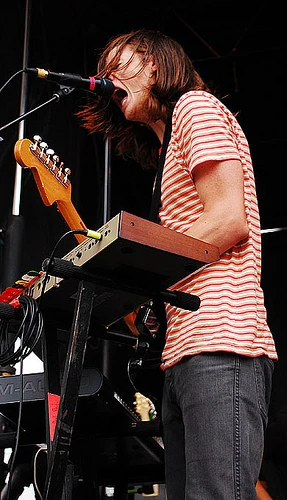
- Parker Case performing with Say Anything

Background information
- Born: Parker Case; February 28, 1981 (age 44)
- Genres: Pop-punk, emo, indie rock
- Instruments: Vocals, guitar, bass guitar, drums, keyboards
- Years active: 2003–present
- Labels: J, Doghouse, RCA, Interscope, Equal Vision Records, Dine Alone Records

Parker Case is an American musician and drummer, mostly known from his involvement in the bands JamisonParker and Say Anything, and is a current member of the latter. Other than Max Bemis himself, Case has been a part of Say Anything longer than any other member (since 2005).

== Career ==
Case was a founding member of the American emo duo JamisonParker, which formed in the early 2000s and released both an EP and a studio album before disbanding. He later joined the rock band Say Anything in 2005 and has remained a member of the group since that time.
