= Alive with the Glory of Love =

Single by Say Anything

from the album ...Is a Real Boy
- Released: September 11, 2006
- Recorded: 2004
- Genre: Emo; pop-punk
- Length: 4:15
- Label: J; Doghouse DOG 108
- Songwriter: Max Bemis
- Producers: Tim O'Heir; Stephen Trask

Say Anything singles chronology
"Alive with the Glory of Love" (2006)	"Wow, I Can Get Sexual Too" (2006)

"Alive with the Glory of Love" is a song by American rock band Say Anything. It was released as the lead single from their second album ...Is a Real Boy, first to radio on June 20, 2006 and then as a physical single on September 11, 2006.

Telling a semi-biographical story about vocalist Max Bemis' grandparents, who were both Holocaust survivors, the song charted at No. 28 on Billboard's Alternative Songs chart.

== Song meaning ==
The song, described as an "intense and oddly uplifting rocker about a relationship torn by the Holocaust," by the Pittsburgh Post-Gazette, is actually semi-biographical in nature, telling the story of songwriter and vocalist Max Bemis's grandparents, both of whom were Holocaust survivors. The song documents the love between two individuals as they live their lives in the ghetto, in hiding, and in the work camp. In an interview, Bemis said: "I thought about what it would be like to be in love and be separated from the person you love, because these times are just as dire in a way. Anything can happen, in a war and terrorist attacks and cynicism and all these actors who oppose love."

In 2024, Bemis said, "That song is about the Holocaust, but it’s self-consciously, you know, I guess maybe toying with the fact you’re not supposed to sing about the Holocaust, or make a love song, or sex song about the Holocaust, especially."

== Reception ==
Naming the song as one of the 100 greatest emo songs of all time, music writer Ian Cohen described the song as "a wildly ambitious and irresponsibly horny piece of musical theater" that "visualized how the primal, procreative urge can still thrive when dead bodies are piling up by the thousands in front of you."

== Music video ==
The music video goes between shots of the band playing in front of a tree and a preteen boy who is sleeping in what we are to believe is a camp. During the night the boy wakes up fully dressed, and equipped with a flashlight sneaks out of his bunk. At the same time, a girl (played by Chloe Greenfield) in another bunk also awakes and steals off into the night. Running out of the camp he descends a flight of stairs while his female companion sneaks out of her cabin. Numerous official looking guards enter both former cabins doing a bed check, and upon finding the empty beds, the lead guard in the female cabin blows a whistle waking up the entire camp, suggesting that this is something other than an ordinary summer camp. All the lights are turned on throughout the camp including large spotlights on towers illuminating the scene while the guards spread out with flashlights. Both continue to run through the woods separated from each other while the guards follow until they reach a large chain link and barbed wire fence. Upon reaching the fence and realizing their situation, they kiss while lights from the other side of the fence illuminate the scene. Escaping through a gap they come upon the band playing to a small crowd. As the guards continue to search now accompanied by German Shepherds both the boy and girl easily blend in with the rest of the crowd. As the band continues to play they crowd surf and when the guards arrive they find a closed gate with no trace of either the children or the band.

The music video has a lot of Holocaust imagery in it, including the bed checks and the camp setting, reminiscent of the work camps that were dotted throughout Europe during the Second World War. The video along with the lyrics ultimately suggest the deeper meaning of this song, which is based on lead singer Max Bemis's grandparents' survival of the holocaust.

The female guard that blows the whistle is the actress Carina Rhea. The video was directed by Kevin Kerslake.

About the video, Bemis said "It's just a song about first love and innocence and defying the rules in the face of love. So, I felt like that was a more innocent, subtle way of expressing the same idea."

== Track listing ==
- Promo single
1. "Alive with the Glory of Love" (Intro Edit) – 4:03
2. "Alive with the Glory of Love" (Album Version) – 4:15
- Red Ink Records release
1. "Alive with the Glory of Love" – 4:15
2. "Slumming it with Johnny" – 3:40

== In other media ==
- The video for "Alive with the Glory of Love" makes a three-second appearance on a television set on the movie Bridge to Terabithia.
- The song was featured on the Scrubs season 6 finale episode, "My Point of No Return", and was also featured in the season 7 premiere, "My Own Worst Enemy".
- The single features on a Kerrang! CD entitled "Kerrang! Under The Influence: The Songs That Inspired My Chemical Romance" as a tribute to Say Anything and to their songs.
- "Alive with the Glory of Love" is also featured in the professional snowboarder Marco Smolla's section on the DVD Prediculous.
- The song is playable DLC for the 2015 rhythm game Rock Band 4.

== Charts ==
Chart (2004)	Peak position
US Billboard Alternative Songs	28
