= Say Anything (band) =

American rock band

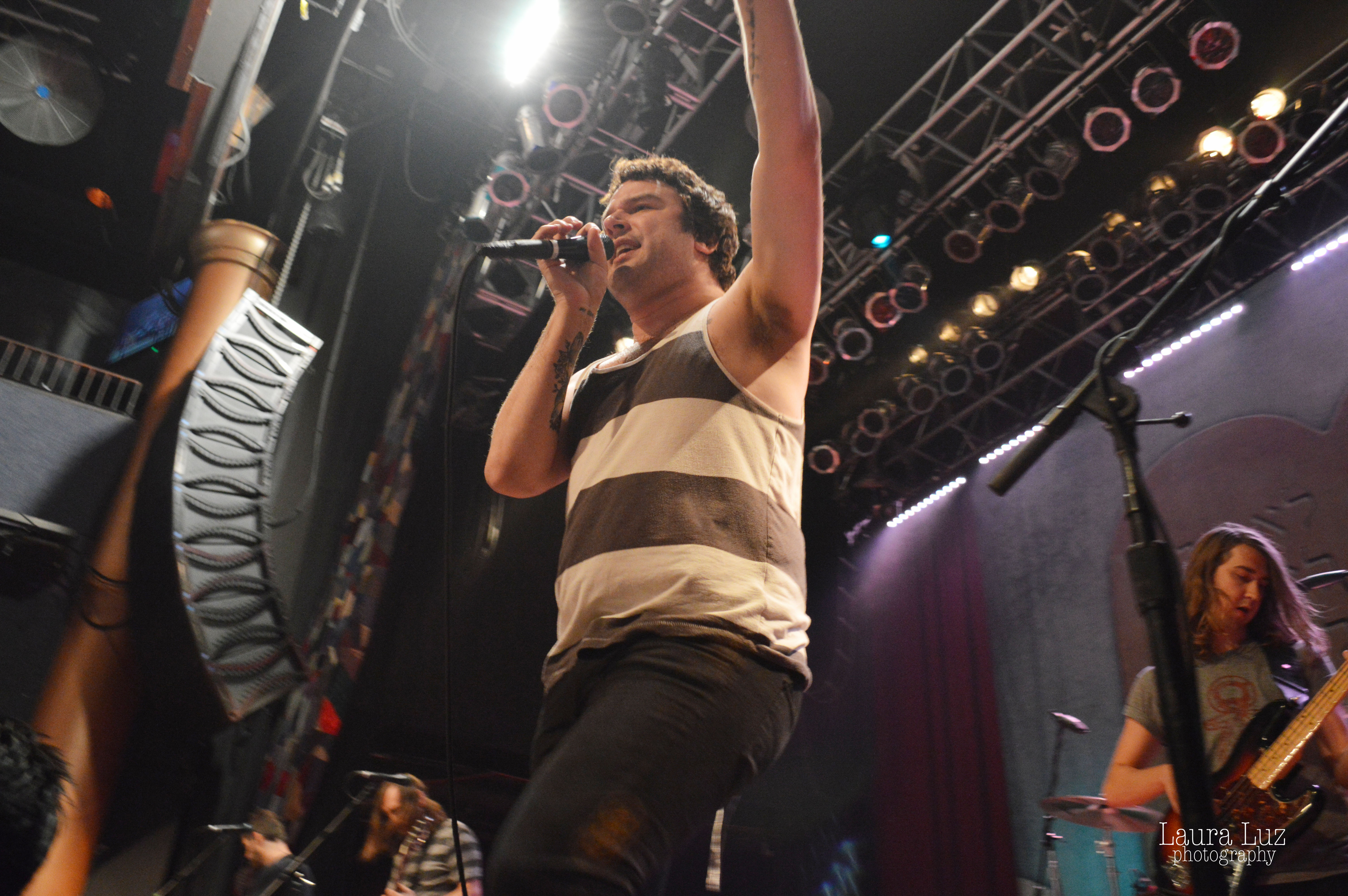
- Vocalist Max Bemis and bassist Garron DuPree performing in concert

Background information
- Origin: Los Angeles, California, U.S.
- Genres: Emo; pop-punk; Indie emo; indie rock; alternative rock
- Years active: 2000–2018; 2022–present
- Labels: Doghouse; J; RCA; Equal Vision; Dine Alone; Rory
- Members: Max Bemis; Coby Linder; Alex Kent; Parker Case; Brian Warren; Fred Mascherino
- Past members: Evan Span; Michael Levin; Josh Eichenstein; Alex Hedric; Kevin Seaton; Jake Turner; Jeff Turner; Adam Siska; Casper Adams; Dan DeLauro; Reed Murray; Garron DuPree; Remington DuPree; Kenny Bridges; Karl Kuehn; Gregory Dunn

Say Anything is an American rock band from Los Angeles, California. The band was formed in 2000 by Max Bemis and his friends, and within two years, they had self-released two EPs and a full-length album.

In 2003, the band signed with their first label, Doghouse Records. A year later, they released their second album, ...Is a Real Boy. To support the album, they picked up new members and began touring; however, despite rapidly growing critical and fan acclaim, Bemis' health problems, including bipolar disorder and drug addictions, sidelined the band in 2005 as five band members left during the year.

Say Anything signed with J Records in 2005 and, following Bemis' successful rehabilitation, re-released ...Is a Real Boy with their new label. They went on co-headlining tours with Saves the Day in 2006 and Hellogoodbye in 2007. In 2008, Say Anything went on a headlining tour across the US and UK and appeared on every date of Warped Tour.

Bemis announced Say Anything's disbandment in 2018, months before the 2019 release of their eighth LP, Oliver Appropriate. The band reunited in 2022 and released their ninth album, ...Is Committed, in 2024, and also released their tenth album The Noise of Say Anything’s Room Without... a year later in 2025.

Say Anything are considered by some journalists to be among the greatest pop-punk bands.

== History ==
=== Early years (2000–2004) ===
The band was formed in 2000 by Max Bemis and four of his friends as Sayanything. Within two years, they self-released two EPs, Junior Varsity and In Your Dreams, and the full-length Baseball: An Album by Sayanything.

In 2002, Sayanything added a space to their name to become Say Anything. In late 2002, Bemis and Linder recorded the Menorah/Majora EP and released the album online. By this point, Say Anything's releases had generated "a major bidding war". Drive-Thru Records pursued the band and called Max Bemis "the next Bob Dylan." Brett Gurewitz of Epitaph Records recorded "A Boston Peace," one of the dorm-room demos, with the band. In early 2003, Say Anything signed with Doghouse Records stating sarcastically that Doghouse "put out such obscure, borderline D.I.Y. records as The All-American Rejects."

After signing with the label, Bemis began writing songs for his band's Doghouse debut. Bemis went into the studio with Florida producer Paul Trust. They recorded 3 songs that were not released although one of the songs entitled "Spider Song" would later appear on a Doghouse compilation. With tremendous self-created pressure, he threw himself into pushing the sonic boundaries of the band and maturing their sound, incorporating elements of math-rock, indie-pop and theatrical pomp. He and Linder also started the search for a producer. The two met several producers but eventually decided on Tim O'Heir and Stephen Trask. Bemis struggled with different ideas for the record and decided the album should focus on "the artistic struggle, the fact that every creative person has this sick ambition to affect some sort of change in society with their art, to be more than just a guy in a band or a poet or a sculptor." Bemis originally intended the album to be a rock opera with a full script, narration, and a cast of characters. It was tentatively titled Zona! Zona! However, Bemis became overwhelmed by the entire process of writing and playing most of the instruments and had a breakdown.

"I literally lost my mind while we were recording," stated Bemis regarding the breakdown. The breakdown was precipitated by a mockumentary discussed by Bemis and O'Heir. Bemis' condition led him to believe he was being secretly filmed for the mockumentary; the situation culminated in him walking the streets of Brooklyn thinking he was being filmed while encountering friends (who were actually strangers). After recovering, Bemis decided to focus solely on the music and dropped the idea of a script. Around July 2003, the band began recording ...Is a Real Boy, their first album with Doghouse Records. Bemis said the two people he wanted to "outdo with ...Is a Real Boy were Andy Warhol and Jesus." In addition to working with O'Heir and Trask, Say Anything worked with Forrest Kline (of power pop band Hellogoodbye) to record the For Sale... EP, released in 2004. The band also worked with ECA Records to record a promotional album that was never released.

...Is a Real Boy was released August 3, 2004. The album featured Linder on drums and Bemis on vocals, guitar, bass guitar, and keyboard. ...Is a Real Boy received positive reviews, including a 99% from AbsolutePunk.net and four and a half stars (out of five) from AllMusic. When the band began touring in support of ...Is a Real Boy, they picked up Dan DeLauro, Casper Adams, and Kevin Seaton.

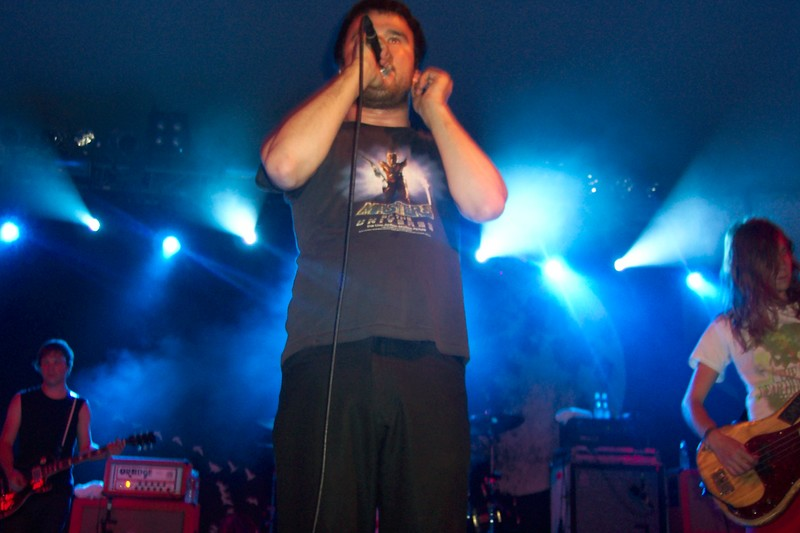
Say Anything at Syracuse University in 2007

Say Anything signed with J Records in 2005, owned by Sony BMG Music Entertainment, one of the "big four" record labels. When asked why he signed with a major label, Bemis stated, "We were looking to expand our fan base as well as have more money to tour comfortably. I also wanted enough money to work with an awesome producer for [In Defense of the Genre]." In June 2005, Say Anything was forced to cancel a six-week headlining tour with Circa Survive and Emanuel on the third day of the tour due to health problems with Bemis, including "full-on paranoid delusions" in Austin, Texas. At this point, Bemis' bipolar disorder and drug addictions were wreaking havoc on the band. Bassists DeLauro and Seaton had already parted ways with the band. Andy Jackson left in September after only a few months of touring with Say Anything. Casper Adams, who was clashing personally with Bemis despite a close friendship, was fired after a show.

On October 3, 2005, Bemis had another breakdown; this time, it involved depressive behavior, spitting in food at an outdoor cafe, spending a "half-hour pouring a bowl of soup onto the floor, one spoonful at a time," engaging in a street fight and finally being admitted to a mental hospital by an off-duty policeman. This incident forced Say Anything to cancel another tour, this time with Bemis' personal idols Saves the Day, along with Senses Fail and The Early November. The band was replaced by Emanuel. After returning from his stay in the hospital, Bemis' mother and the remaining members of the band selected the Menninger clinic in Houston, Texas, to rehab Bemis. Eventually, Bemis approved of their decision, admitted himself to the Menninger clinic, and has reportedly not had a relapse since.

=== ...Is a Real Boy (2005–2007) ===
Under J Records, Say Anything re-released ...Is a Real Boy with a bonus CD entitled ...Was a Real Boy on February 28, 2006 (although the album was originally slated for release on October 18, 2005 and later January 17, 2006). However, copies were leaked before the official release date by Tower Records and HMV, with some copies selling on eBay at inflated prices. According to the album's liner notes, ...Was a Real Boy was originally intended as charity record and recorded in Kevin Seaton's garage. Bemis said that "it was J Records' idea to reissue ...Is a Real Boy. They believe it has a mainstream appeal that wasn't really reached when Doghouse released the record." Around this time, the band also released "Alive with the Glory of Love" as a single.

Alex Kent joined the band to play bass guitar after the band met him while touring with Lance's Hero. Jake and Jeff Turner joined to play guitar and help with backup vocals after Adams and Jackson left. Parker Case completed the sextet when he joined to play guitar and keyboard after his previous band JamisonParker broke up. At the time, JamisonParker and Say Anything shared the same manager, Randy Nichols; the band met Case while at a train station on the way to Nichols' wedding.

In summer 2006, Say Anything toured with Dashboard Confessional; Ben Lee was with the tour in the US, while John Ralston joined the tour in Canada. The band was asked to be a part of the Warped Tour 2006, but instead opted for the Dashboard tour. Bemis later made statements implying he did not feel he was emotionally ready for a Warped Tour.

Say Anything completed one of their first headlining tours in fall 2006, when they toured with Piebald and mewithoutYou. Days Away, Brazil and Forgive Durden opened for the band on select dates. In February 2007, Say Anything performed on Last Call with Carson Daly. The band also released their second single, "Wow, I Can Get Sexual Too," which was from the ...Was a Real Boy bonus disc. Also in that month, the band announced a co-headlining tour with Saves the Day and The Almost, John Ralston, The Dear Hunter, and Manchester Orchestra as openers on select dates. The band completed the tour successfully during April and May of that year. In August, Say Anything announced a co-headlining tour with Hellogoodbye sponsored by MySpace. The tour took place during fall of the same year with shows in the US and Europe.

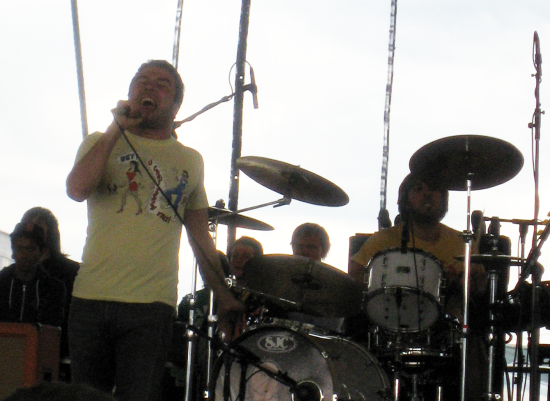
Bemis and Linder at Warped Tour, 2008-07-24

=== In Defense of the Genre (2007–2008) ===
In the weeks before the release of their third album, Say Anything released several songs from the album on MySpace. They also announced pre-ordered copies could be ordered with a signed CD booklet. The band released their first single from the new album, "Baby Girl, I'm a Blur", on October 2, 2007. In Defense of the Genre was released on October 23, 2007. It was released in a dual-disc format complete with 27 songs and contained many guest vocals. When asked about the name of the record, Bemis said, "Whatever 'genre' (or music) one loves needs a defense, because half the world is too ignorant to really understand something before they dismiss it." Before recording the record, Bemis stated, "I hope that [In Defense] will be more inspiring and uplifting. I want [the record] to be The Joshua Tree with balls on laughing gas."

Andy Jackson, a former member of the band and close friend of Bemis, along with Liam Ortmeier was responsible for recording many of the cameo appearances. He recorded some cameos while at the Warped Tour 2007 with Hot Rod Circuit and others in his home studio. Jackson recorded vocals from several musicians, such as Gerard Way, Adam Lazzara, Anthony Raneri, Anthony Green, Hayley Williams, Aaron Gillespie, Jordan Pundik, and Chad Gilbert. Chris Conley and several others also provided guest vocals. Alternative Press called the record "a truly magnificent sophomore effort" and gave it a 4.5/5, while Spin gave the album four stars and Corey Schmidt of PastePunk said, "There are a few really great songs here."

In January 2008, Say Anything announced a US headlining tour with Manchester Orchestra, Biffy Clyro and Weatherbox. The tour took place in March and April of that year. After finishing this tour, Say Anything announced a headlining tour in the UK that took place in June. The tour was in support of In Defense of the Genre, which was released in the UK on June 23, 2008.

Say Anything released the video for "Shiksa (Girlfriend)" on April 9, 2008. On April 25, Say Anything performed on Late Night with Conan O'Brien. During summer 2008, Say Anything joined the Warped Tour for the first time, appearing on all dates. On August 1, 2008, Say Anything announced the Max Bemis Song Shop, through which users could pay for Max Bemis to write a song based on a short writing by the customer. However, by the end of the night, the item was no longer available with the following text displayed on the item listing: "We're sorry but Max can't write songs as fast as you are requesting them. As soon as he catches up we will start again. Thank you so much for believing in our crazy idea." The Song Shop has reopened semi-annually since its initial launch, and taken down after about a week each time. This aforementioned message has been displayed each time the Song Shop was discontinued.

=== Say Anything (2008–2009) ===
In an online chat with fans on March 14, 2008, Max Bemis stated that the band has plans to record a new record called This Is Forever. He said it will be "about God and how we relate to Him." AbsolutePunk.net reported on August 1, 2008, that J Records "picked up the option for Say Anything's next release." On November 10, Bemis announced that the focus of the fourth album changed and the new record will be self-titled. He noted that the album, which will be released in 2009, will ask "what the point of all of it was."

Though Max has explained that he was very proud of In Defense of the Genre, he described it as being more of an "homage to sort of a lot of the bands that we liked and, like, a style that we respected." He then explained that the new album would be "more concise and would be a bit more original, I want to say, and sort of pop out like Is a Real Boy did." He also explained that this CD has both the catchiest and most mature songs they've ever recorded and called it a "step forward."

During a concert at the College of Saint Rose in Albany, New York on April 25, 2009, Max Bemis proclaimed to the crowd that the newest album titled "Say Anything" is complete, and will be released "early summer," after stating that he was married three weeks prior to the event on April 4, 2009.

According to Say Anything's In Studio website, on May 21, 2009, Max posted a blog stating, "I just wanted to let you guys know we’re done recording our new record, entitled "Say Anything", and we’re moving into the mixing phase. It should be out this fall. This record is kind of a new start, or at least a new phase in the Say Anything story."

Max posted a blog on Myspace.com saying that the new album will be released October 13, 2009, and will be titled Say Anything. The self-titled album will be released by RCA Records and will have 13 tracks, including "Hate Everyone", the album's first single. "Hate Everyone" was officially released on August 25, 2009, after WBRU FM in Providence, RI became the first radio station to debut the single on the 17th. Lead singer Max Bemis also premiered the song "Crush'd," performing the song acoustic in WBRU's studio. The corresponding video for Hate Everyone was released on MySpace Music on September 1, 2009. The new album's release date had been delayed by three weeks and was officially released on November 3, 2009, after being posted to the band's Myspace page on October 28.

On August 19, 2010, it was confirmed that Say Anything and RCA Records had parted ways. Max Bemis also announced via his Twitter account that big changes were to be announced during the following week.

On September 29, 2010, it was announced via Say Anything's official website that Alex Kent would be leaving the band, and that Kenny Vasoli of The Starting Line would be temporarily taking over as bassist for their upcoming tour. On October 24, 2011, it was announced that Adam Siska was officially joining Say Anything.

=== Side projects (2008–2011) ===
After recording In Defense of the Genre, Say Anything band members Max Bemis and Coby Linder worked with Saves the Day's Chris Conley and David Soloway on a side project named Two Tongues. The group features Bemis and Conley sharing lead vocals and guitar duties with Soloway on bass guitar and Linder on drums. Thirteen songs were recorded in Electric Ladybug Studio, Conley's home studio in Chico, California. Bemis, Conley, and Linder previously collaborated on a cover song of Bob Dylan's "The Man In Me" for the compilation album Paupers, Peasants, Princes & Kings: The Songs of Bob Dylan released by Doghouse Records in 2006. The group's self-titled debut was released on February 3, 2009.

Say Anything band members Jake and Jeff Turner self-released their six-track EP Some Day in February 2009 under the name XO. They recorded it with Matt Malpass in Atlanta in January 2008 at Monsters and Marigolds Studio. The album features both brothers on vocals, guitar, bass, and keyboard, with Jeff also playing drums. Around the same time, Parker Case embarked on a solo project named I and the Universe, while Alex Kent started a record label, Gnome Records and began work on his own solo effort under the name Alexander T. Kent. Alex also has a side project with members of Japandi and Witt called Qwermicide.

In 2008, Say Anything featured on the Punk Goes Crunk album covering Ol' Dirty Bastard's "Got Your Money".

In 2009, Max and his wife, Sherri DuPree (From the band Eisley) formed a small side project named "Perma" and were selling the demo during the 2009 tour.

In early 2010, the band announced that they will be opening for Angels and Airwaves on their LOVE tour which kicked off on April 5.

In August 2010, Max announced that he will be releasing a "lo-fi" post-punk album in Fall 2010 under the name "Max Bemis and The Painful Splits."

Say Anything also toured with the bands Motion City Soundtrack and Saves the Day in the fall of 2010. Bemis commented on it on his Twitter, claiming that Say Anything's fans might want to come up with their favorite Two Tongues songs, insinuating that the group will play a few songs on the tour.

=== Anarchy, My Dear (2011–2013) ===
On 13 July 2011, Max Bemis posted a video on the band's website announcing that the band has officially signed with Equal Vision Records, he also stated that Tim O'Heir, who produced their second record ...Is a Real Boy would be producing Say Anything's fifth studio record. Additionally, Bemis stated Equal Vision had acquired the rights to Say Anything's past releases, as he cited the proposed re-release of Baseball. Bemis announced via an October 6 interview with AltPress.com that the name of the new record was Anarchy, My Dear, and this was later confirmed by Bemis and the rest of the band via Twitter. Anarchy, My Dear was released on March 13, 2012. On April 20, 2012, the music video for the song "Say Anything" premiered on mtvU.

On November 9, 2012, Equal Vision announced a statement that confirms the release of the re-release of the Say Anything record Baseball, the Menora/Mejora EP, the "Dormroom Demos", Junior Varsity, and other various rarities in a triple-CD box set that are limited to 5000 physical copies. A citation and more information can be found at Equal Vision's website.

On December 28, 2012, it was announced via Say Anything's Facebook page that Coby had left the band on good terms. Max Bemis stated the following in regards to seeking a new drummer "Say Anything will continue on without Coby but we will not be seeking a replacement drummer to play on the records we put out, as Coby and his style of drumming is, in many senses, irreplaceable; rather we plan on having a multitude of drummers play on our material. Say Anything on record will now be identified in the same way Nine Inch Nails is, in that it's pretty much me and whoever I choose to play with at the time. Live shows will continue to have their own identity including Jake, Jeff, Parker, Adam, and whoever plays drums for us live. The band couldn't be further from breaking up, and as I’ve said recently, we plan on releasing music as Say Anything forever, and already have a lot in the works."

=== All My Friends Are Enemies: Early Rarities (2013–2014) ===
On January 22, 2013, Say Anything released All My Friends Are Enemies: Early Rarities, a three-disc compilation consisting of all of the material recorded by Say Anything prior to the release of ...Is a Real Boy. Disc one of this compilation is a copy of Baseball: An Album by Sayanything; disc two is Menorah/Majora EP and the Dormroom Demos; and disc three is titled Junior Varsity and includes all the songs from the first Junior Varsity (in Your Dreams) EP, in addition to other tracks. Overall, the album contains 45 remastered B-side tracks from the early days of Say Anything. Jake and Jeff Turner left the band to pursue their shoegaze/emo band, XO, full time, recording their debut album “ Heart” for Max’s imprint under Equal Vision Records, Rory, in California with Parker Case engineering.

The band toured from June 6, 2013 to late summer to promote this album.

=== Hebrews (2014–2015) ===
On January 13, 2014, wife of Max Bemis, Sherri DuPree-Bemis published an Instagram photo stating that the new Say Anything album is almost mixed. The band's record, Hebrews, was released June 10, 2014 on Equal Vision Records. The album was the first album that was self-produced by front-man Max Bemis. Bemis worked in the studio with audio engineer Garron DuPree for many months while recording the album at Bemis and Dupree's own studio in Tyler, TX. The album was mixed by mix engineer Brad Wood, and mastered by Emily Lazar. It returned to the collaborative nature of the band's earlier material, with guest vocals including Jon Simmons of Balance and Composure, Tom Delonge of Blink 182 and Angels and Airwaves, Andy Hull of Manchester Orchestra, Brian Sella of The Front Bottoms and Jeremy Bolm of Touche Amore. The album was met with positive reception by fans and critics upon its release, and the group embarked on a successful headlining tour in support of the album in the summer of 2014.

=== I Don't Think It Is (2016–2017) ===
At about midnight EST on February 4, 2016, Say Anything released I Don't Think It Is without any prior announcement besides several teaser posts the day before. The album was co-produced by Bemis and Darren King of Mutemath, who also played drums and percussion, as well as Liam Ortmeier, who briefly appeared in previous works on guitar. The record was mixed by Will Yip and featured contributions by members of The Hotelier, Tiny Moving Parts, Eisley, Japanese Breakfast and others.

In 2017 it was announced drummer Reed Murray would be leaving the band. He was then replaced by Remington DuPree of Eisley for the band's In Defense of the Genre tenth anniversary tour.

The band announced their signing to Dine Alone Records at South by Southwest 2018 and revealed the existence of a forthcoming LP produced by Will Yip.

=== Oliver Appropriate and hiatus (2018) ===
On August 16, 2018, Bemis announced the band's hiatus in a nine-page letter to fans where he also discussed his struggles with his sexual orientation and drug use. He also announced the band's final album at the time would be titled Oliver Appropriate and would not be supported with live performances because he is "done being a touring musician." The album was released on January 25, 2019 via Dine Alone Records. Bemis described it as a sequel to ...Is a Real Boy, featuring an adult version of the narrator fictionalized on that record who struggles with his own sexuality, leading to a violent conclusion.

In July 2019, Bemis then announced a solo tour with Perma, his collaborative project with his wife Sherri DuPree.

On October 11, 2022, Bemis announced on Instagram that Say Anything would be reuniting in 2023 to play the When We Were Young festival.

=== Reunion and ...Is Committed (2023–present) ===
In April 2023, Bemis posted a press release via the website Chorus.fm, detailing a reunion and new music, as well as announcing an all-new line-up consisting of himself, Case, Kent, co-founder Coby Linder (who previously left in 2012), and the addition of Fred Mascherino (Taking Back Sunday, The Color Fred) and Brian Warren (Weatherbox). A new single, "Psyche!", was released on April 28.

Throughout the year, the band played on various dates at venues including the Bowery Ballroom in New York City, the Red Rocks Amphitheatre in Denver (opening for the Front Bottoms), and the Regent Theatre in Los Angeles. They also played at the aforementioned When We Were Young Festival in Las Vegas.

On December 6, 2023, the band announced a 20th anniversary tour for ...Is a Real Boy to commence in April 2024 at the House of Blues in Dallas.

On March 21, 2024, the band announced via Instagram that their ninth studio album, ...Is Committed, would be released digitally on May 24 through Dine Alone Records. It was produced by Max Bemis and In Defense of the Genre's Brad Wood.

On October 24, 2025, the band released a surprise EP, ...Is Sleazy, featuring covers of songs by Animal Collective, The Strokes and Yeah Yeah Yeahs. The EP received negative reviews from music critics and fans. On December 4, Say Anything released a 21-song album, The Noise of Say Anything's Room Without..., although they did not perform material from this release during their live shows in the same month.

On July 8, 2026, Say Anything announced a collaborative album with Wavves titled Cherry Soda, to be released on September 18. It was supported by the lead single "Deathx1k".

On August 28, 2026, Bemis canceled his upcoming solo concerts after being accused of sexual misconduct by multiple underage fans, although he said the decision was made to "prioritize his mental health and personal well-being." Wavves singer Nathan Williams confirmed that the release of Cherry Soda would be scrapped, also claiming that Bemis only spent three days in the studio to make it while Williams spent 11 months. It was later recorded as a solo Wavves album.

== Artistry ==
=== Musical style and influences ===
Say Anything's music falls into the emo, indie rock, and pop-punk genres. They can most easily be identified by their sardonic, literary sense of humor balanced out with a sense of intense catharsis. The band, as well as certain artists within the indie/punk scene such as Cursive, MewithoutYou, Brand New, Bright Eyes and Manchester Orchestra tend to straddle the line between older fans and a youth oriented audience. Their style incorporates pieces of hardcore, bombastic arena rock and post punk. Bemis, the primary songwriter of Say Anything, stated, "I believe that an artist should let his art be appreciated by anyone who's interested and not 'play favorites'." He also said that lyrics are "based on experience." However, due to Bemis' bipolar disorder and his resulting mentality, the themes of the songs are often surreal, bleak, irreverent, personal, and autobiographical. Other themes include distaste with snobbery and hypocrisy. Drugs and mankind's relationship with drugs are also a popular subject in Say Anything's songs, especially on ...Is a Real Boy, which was written and recorded after Bemis' several drug-fueled breakdowns. Specifically, "Admit It!!!", "Yellow Cat (Slash) Red Cat", "Try To Remember, Forget", "The Writhing South", and "Sorry, Dudes, My Bad" include references to Bemis' drug usage. In general, Say Anything tends to draw inspiration from alienation from a flawed society but confers a sense of hope.

Max Bemis was raised "in a strong Jewish environment." Many of Bemis' lyrics borrow from his Jewish roots, and contain elements of Jewish humor. While most of band's earlier songs are free of any such inspiration, the songs of ...Is a Real Boy and In Defense of the Genre include references to Jewish heritage. "Alive with the Glory of Love," Say Anything's first single, has a main subject of a relationship affected by World War II and the Holocaust, based on Bemis's grandparents, while "Wow, I Can Get Sexual Too" includes mentions of "the old shul" and a rabbi's teachings. A strong example from In Defense comes from the lyrics of "Died a Jew". The song includes several references to the Jewish people and its history along with mentions of "the murder of God" and Bemis' departures from kosher. References to religion come again in "Fed to Death" on Say Anything, referring to a 'man from Nazareth' who would one day 'spring to life to smile and clear your name' but until then 'nail yourself upon the cross and hang your head in shame.'

In regards to writing songs for ...Is a Real Boy, Bemis stated, "The songs were jam packed with fairly blatant nods to bands I dig (Queen, Saves the Day, Pavement, Faith No More, Fugazi, etc.)." These can be considered some of Say Anything's influences. Other influences at some point cited by the band include Botch, Weezer, The Stooges, Neutral Milk Hotel, Sunny Day Real Estate, Wilco, and the Foo Fighters. Also of note, the band has covered songs by Ol' Dirty Bastard ("Got Your Money"), Notorious B.I.G. ("No Soul" contains the same hook as the sample in "Juicy" although it adheres more closely to the original song "Juicy Fruit" from which the sample for the Notorious B.I.G. song was taken), The Four Tops ("Sure, Baby...Hold Back" features a chorus lifted from "Sugar Pie Honey Bunch"), Safety in Numbers ("Dealer"), Saves the Day ("Jessie and My Whetstone"), and Bob Dylan ("The Man in Me").

Max Bemis expounded upon the story of In Defense of the Genre as well as the differences between that album and ...Is a Real Boy in an interview with AbsolutePunk.net on June 19, 2007.

=== Live performances ===
During live shows, some members of the group (other than Bemis) sing backing vocals. Bemis often sings parts he wrote, but which were sung by guest vocalists on studio recordings. In recent years, Bemis has switched up the lineup of performing musicians, using some permanent members of the groups, while rotating other musicians in and out of the live lineup. Beginning on the "All My Friends Are Enemies – Rarities Tour," Bemis added drummer Reed Murray, and bassist Garron DuPree. In summer of 2014 on the Hebrews tour, Bemis recruited ex-Taking Back Sunday member Fred Mascherino, Moneen guitarist Kenny Bridges, and Moving Mountains vocalist Greg Dunn to replace Jake and Jeff Turner and Parker Case, who were at the time performing with their band XO.

In the midst of the "Me Too" movement and accusations of sexual harassment against numerous prominent musicians, Bemis announced that the band would no longer perform "Wow, I Can Get Sexual Too" during live shows in 2017. His Twitter post stated that the song portrayed a "sarcastic caricature of someone I’ve never been at all and is no longer appropriate during this crisis."

On September 8, 2020, frontman Max Bemis performed an online acoustic performance of the band's debut album, "...Is a Real Boy" in its entirety on an online livestream. During the livestream, Bemis stated that if the turnout for the livestream went well, the remaining Say Anything albums may also be performed online by livestream.

== Band members ==
Current

- Max Bemis – vocals, occasional guitar and keyboards (2000–2018, 2022–present)
- Coby Linder – drums, backing vocals (2000–2012, 2022–present)
- Alex Kent – bass guitar, backing vocals (2004–2010, 2016, 2022–present)
- Parker Case – keyboards, guitar, backing vocals (2005–2018, 2022–present)
- Fred Mascherino – guitar, backing vocals (2022–present; 2014 touring member)
- Brian Warren – guitar, backing vocals (2022–present)

Touring

- Andy Jackson – guitar (2005)
- Kenny Vasoli – bass guitar, backing vocals (2010–2011)
- Chris Conley – guitar, backing vocals (2014)
- Greg Dunn – guitar, keyboards, backing vocals (2014–2016)
- Ryan Pope – drums (2024)

Former

- Evan Span – guitar (2000–2001)
- Michael Levin – bass (2000–2002)
- Josh Eichenstein (2000)
- Dan DeLauro – bass (2003–2004)
- Casper Adams – guitar (2003–2005)
- Alex Hedrick — guitar (2004)
- Kevin Seaton – bass, guitar (2004–2005)
- Jake Turner – guitar, bass, backing vocals (2004–2014)
- Jeff Turner – guitar, backing vocals (2005–2014)
- Adam Siska – bass guitar (2011–2013)
- Garron DuPree – bass (2013–2018)
- Reed Murray – drums, backing vocals (2013–2017)
- Kenny Bridges – guitar, backing vocals (2014–2018)
- Remington DuPree – drums (2017–2018)
- Karl Kuehn – drums (2018)

== Discography ==
Studio albums

- Baseball: An Album by Say Anything (2001)
- ...Is a Real Boy (2004)
- In Defense of the Genre (2007)
- Say Anything (2009)
- Anarchy, My Dear (2012)
- Hebrews (2014)
- I Don't Think It Is (2016)
- Oliver Appropriate (2019)
- ...Is Committed (2024)
- The Noise of Say Anything's Room Without... (2025)
