= Matt Pryor =

Matt Pryor may refer to:

- Matt Pryor (musician) (born 1978), American musician
- Matt Pryor (politician) (born 1960), American politician from Michigan
- Matt Pryor (American football) (born 1994), American football offensive lineman

== See also ==
- Matthew Prior (disambiguation)
