= Max Bemis =

American singer (born 1984)

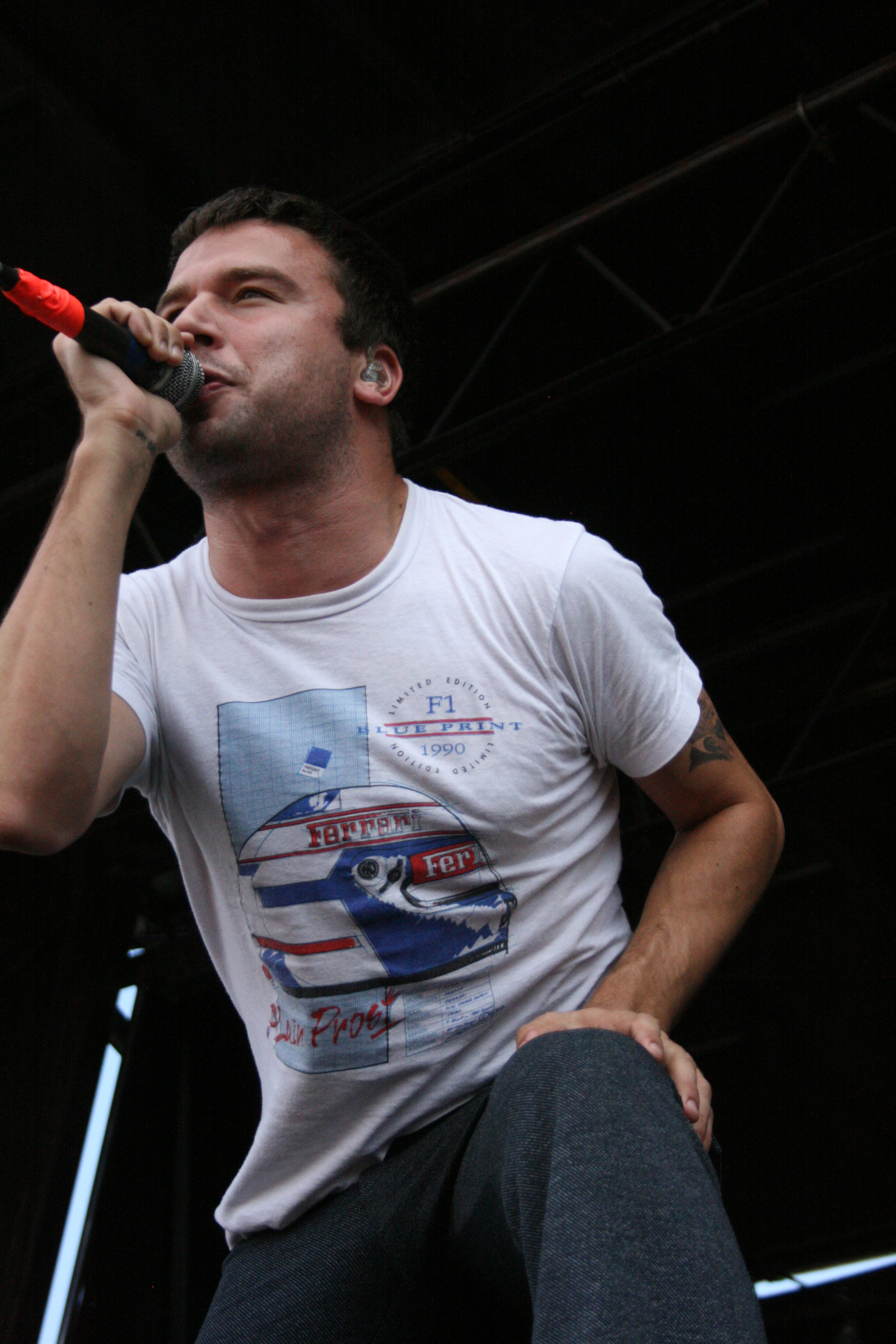
- Bemis at the Warped Tour 2008

Background information
- Born: Maxim Adam Bemis; April 6, 1984 (age 42); New York City, U.S.
- Origin: Los Angeles, California, U.S.
- Genres: Emo; pop-punk; Indie emo; indie rock; alternative rock
- Occupations: Musician; singer; songwriter
- Instruments: Vocals; guitar; keyboards
- Years active: 2000–present

Maxim Adam Bemis (/ˈbiːmɪs/; born April 6, 1984) is an American musician, best known as the lead singer and primary songwriter of the rock band Say Anything. He sang alongside Chris Conley in the supergroup Two Tongues (which featured band members from Say Anything and Saves the Day). He plays alongside his former wife Sherri DuPree under the name Perma, and is a comic book writer, chiefly for Marvel Comics, creating X-Men: Worst X-Man Ever and Foolkiller: Psycho Therapy.

== Early life ==
Bemis was born in New York City in 1984. His family moved to Hollywood, California when he was a child. Bemis took piano lessons which he credits for the realization that he wanted to make music. In addition, Bemis was raised "in a strong Jewish environment," which has influenced his music. His maternal grandparents were survivors of the Holocaust, which was the inspiration for the song, "Alive with the Glory of Love."

Bemis attended high school at Windward School, a private school in Los Angeles. He had also attended Camp Ramah in Ojai, California, where he met future band-mate Coby Linder. In 2000, Bemis, Linder, and friends from Windward and Beverly Hills High School formed Say Anything. The band was described as a high school band, but they released a full-length LP and an EP. In 2002, Bemis attended Sarah Lawrence College. However, he spent much of his time recording his own music and left the school after only a few months. Bemis has mentioned Tom Delonge of Blink 182 as an influence from a very young age, and was excited to work with him on Hebrews.

== Career ==
=== Say Anything ===
Bemis is the lead singer, guitarist and primary lyricist of Say Anything as well as a founding member of the band. After the resignation of the original band members, he is the only original member remaining. In 2000, Say Anything released Junior Varsity. The band released its debut full-length album, Baseball, in 2001. Despite attending Sarah Lawrence College for a short time, Bemis kept the band alive, performing much if not all of the music that went into Menorah/Majora and the band's dormroom demos.

Say Anything released ...Is a Real Boy in 2004. Bemis performed the vocals, guitar, bass, and keyboard parts for the album. After the album's release, the band went through a rocky period lasting over a year due to Bemis's mental health. The band canceled at least two tours and lost several members. By 2007 however, after going through rehab, Say Anything and Bemis got back on track with co-headlining tours with Saves the Day and Hellogoodbye. In 2007, the band released In Defense of the Genre, on which Bemis sang lead vocals and played guitar and keyboard.

Say Anything's self-titled album was released November 3, 2009.

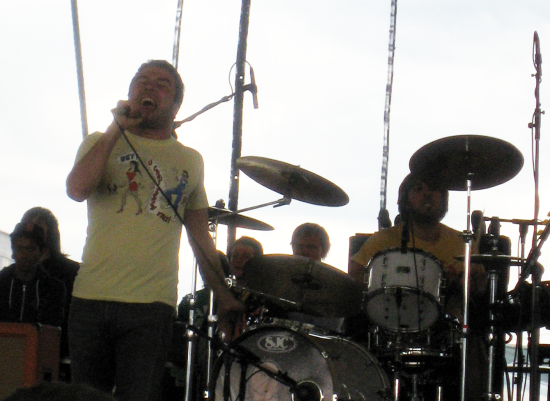
Bemis with Say Anything in 2008

On November 5, 2010, at The Starland Ballroom in Sayreville, New Jersey, Bemis announced a forthcoming Say Anything album. The album, called Anarchy, My Dear, was released March 13, 2012, which was followed up with their headlining spring tour. Their first single from that album is "Burn a Miracle". They released a music video for this single.

On January 22, 2013, Say Anything released a collection of older songs and b-sides called All My Friends Are Enemies: Early Rarities consisting of all of the material recorded by Say Anything prior to the release of ...Is a Real Boy. The band did a summer tour to promote the album.

On June 10, 2014, Say Anything released the album Hebrews through Equal Vision Records.

On February 5, 2016, Say Anything released their new album I Don't Think It Is without any prior announcement besides several teaser posts the day before.

=== Two Tongues ===
After recording In Defense of the Genre, Say Anything band members Max Bemis and Coby Linder worked with Saves the Day's Chris Conley and David Soloway on a side project named Two Tongues. The group consisted of Bemis and Conley sharing the lead vocals and guitar duties, Soloway on bass and Linder on drums. Thirteen songs were recorded in Electric Ladybug Studio, Conley's home studio in Chico, California.

Bemis, Conley, and Linder had previously collaborated on a cover song of Bob Dylan's "The Man In Me" for the compilation album Paupers, Peasants, Princes & Kings: The Songs of Bob Dylan released by Doghouse Records in 2006. On November 7, 2008, a release date of February 3, 2009, was announced for the self-produced, self-titled, thirteen-track collaboration on Vagrant Records.

In fall of 2010, Two Tongues made their first performances as a surprise in the middle of Say Anything's set each night of the Motion City Soundtrack, Say Anything, and Saves the Day tour. They performed the song "Crawl". Arun Bali (current guitarist of Saves the Day) played guitar, Kenny Vasoli (of The Starting Line, and Person L) played bass, Jake Turner (of Say Anything) played guitar as well, Coby Linder played drums, while Chris Conley, and Max Bemis sang. Two Tongues released their second LP, "2", in 2016.

=== Other work ===
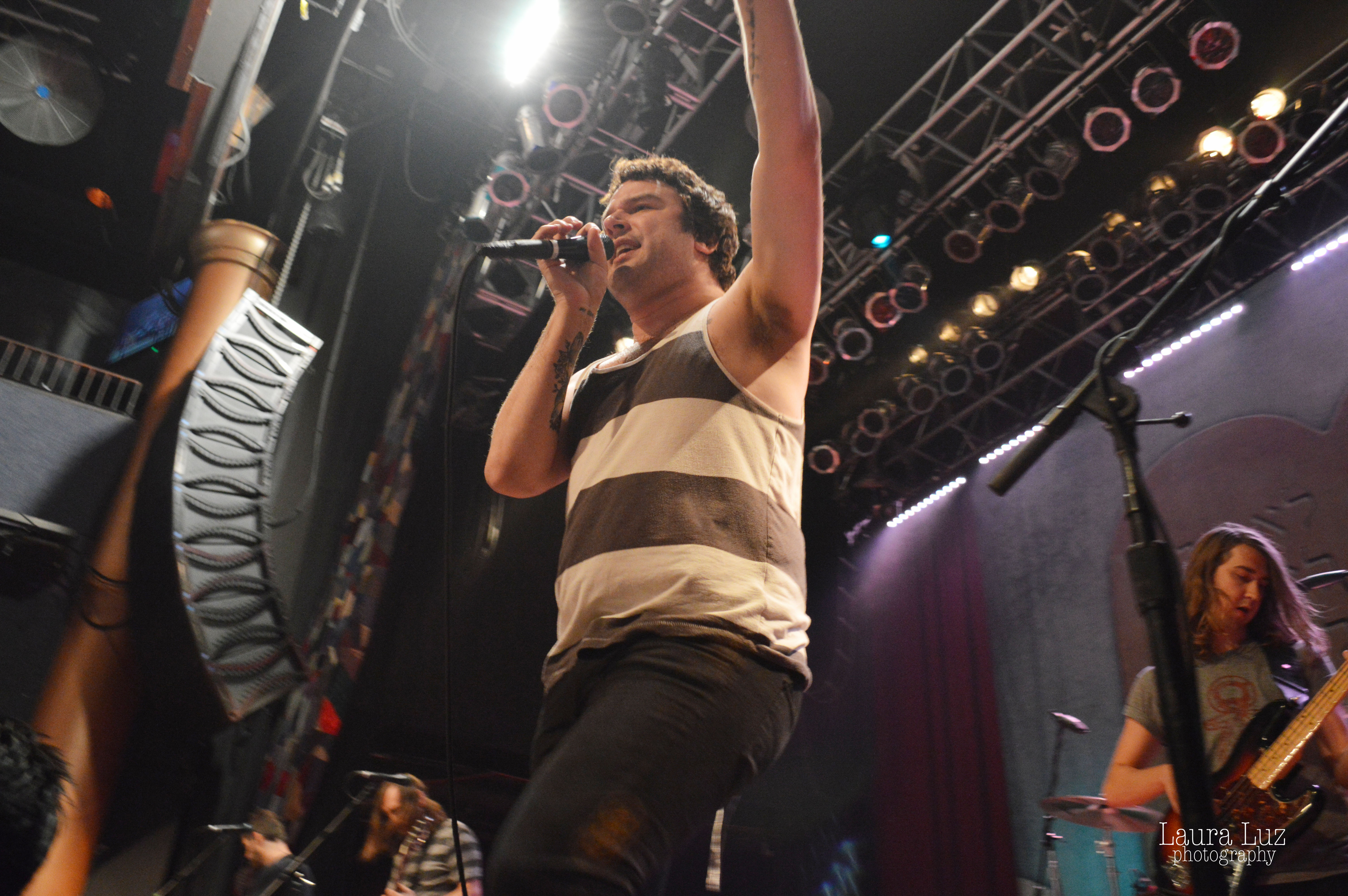
Bemis performing in San Diego in 2014

Bemis has made cameo appearances on several albums. One of his earliest cameo appearances was with friend Andy Jackson and Hot Rod Circuit on "Inhabit," a song from the band's album Reality's Coming Through.

In 2005, Bemis was featured on "Ready" from The Starting Line's Based on a True Story.

Bemis worked with Armor for Sleep on a cover of "Today" for a 2008 The Smashing Pumpkins tribute CD entitled The Killer in You.

In 2007, he performed in two songs, "Maxim and the Headphone Life" and "Regional Community Theater," on LadybiRdS' debut album, Regional Community Theater. Bemis sang along with Shawn Harris (The Matches) and Rachel Minton (Zolof the Rock & Roll Destroyer) on "Hello Helicopter" and "Point Of Extinction" of Motion City Soundtrack's Even if it Kills Me.

New Found Glory's From the Screen to Your Stereo Part II and Down to Earth Approach's Come Back to You also featured guest vocals by Bemis on the songs "Crazy for You" and "See You," respectively.

In 2008, Bemis sang vocals on Nightbeast's Inside Jokes for Outside Folks. Also, Forgive Durden's second album Razia's Shadow featured Bemis as Barayas the Spider in "The Spider and the Lamps."

Bemis also appeared on the opening track of You, Me, and Everyone We Know's 2008 sophomore EP So Young, So Insane, entitled "I Can Get Back Up Now".

In August 2008, Bemis announced that he would be recording unique songs for individual fans written on their requested topics as a part of a project he hoped would decrease the growing gap between artists and fans.

Bemis announced in September 2009 that he and his wife, Sherri DuPree of Eisley, were working on a small project that "became something even cooler". They created a side project called Perma and on October 29, 2013, released the album Two of a Crime on Equal Vision Records.

Bemis and Say Anything were also featured on the Punk Goes Crunk album with their cover of Ol' Dirty Bastard's "Got Your Money".

Bemis announced in late September 2010 that he had written and recorded a 10-song album of acoustic songs that he called Max Bemis and the Painful Splits. Bemis stressed that this release was not an official solo record, but a collection of songs he had written that he was proud of and wanted to share with Say Anything fans. The disc could only be found and purchased by going to one of the show dates of Say Anything's tour with Saves The Day and Motion City Soundtrack October through November 2010.

On his Twitter in mid-November 2010, Bemis announced, "There WILL be a second Max Bemis and the Painful Splits record sold next year at a very special SA event that I can't reveal yet", confirming that there will be a second Painful Splits record. It was later revealed that this event was to be a Max Bemis solo tour in February 2011 across ten different venues, beginning on the 11th and finishing on the 26th. Subsequently, Bemis released several records under the moniker, usually coinciding with a specific tour.

Bemis created an imprint label named Rory Records in 2012. The releases of his label are distributed by Equal Vision Records. TALLHART was the first signed artist of the label.

In May 2015, Bemis appeared as a guest vocalist on the track "Friends" for I the Mighty's album Connector.

He has sung and played instruments on several albums released by his ex-wife's band Eisley.

=== Writing ===
Bemis has been writing comics since 2013, when he announced a four-part limited series, Polarity, published by Boom! Studios. The story follows a hero, Tim Woods, who has bipolar disorder and the trade paperback featured an exclusive acoustic four song EP composed and recorded specifically as a companion to the graphic novel. Fox optioned the right to create this story into a TV series. In 2013, Marvel Comics invited him as a guest writer on A+X No. 14 to write a story about Magneto and Superior Spider-Man teaming up against M.O.D.O.K. and A.I.M. In 2015, Boom! Studios announced an ongoing comic series called, Evil Empire, which is about a complicated relationship between a musician and aspiring politician. In 2015 he teamed up with Logan Faerber for his third comic series, Oh, Killstrike. Also in 2015, he wrote a five-issue miniseries for Marvel Comics, X-Men: Worst X-Man Ever, first published weekly in January and February 2016, later published into a trade paperback. He also wrote two arcs of Crossed: Badlands for Avatar Press and an adaptation of Atari's Centipide for Dynamite Entertainment.

In July 2016, Marvel Comics announced a new five-issue series starring Foolkiller, written by Bemis and art by Dalibor Talajic & Jose F. Marzan Jr. Issue No. 1 was released in November 2016, continuing through the March release of issue No. 5. Bemis penned the Marvel Legacy reboot of Moon Knight in 2017, covering issues #188-200 with artists Jacen Burrows and Paul Davidson.

== Personal life ==
Bemis said as a teen that he had been diagnosed with bipolar disorder, which he gave as the reason he has self-medicated with drugs, primarily marijuana. He experienced a manic episode while making the album ...Is a Real Boy.

Bemis has what he calls a "new age, metaphysical view" about religion, and considers himself "a Jew who is also a Christian". He came out as bisexual in 2018.

From 2009 to 2025, Bemis was married to musician Sherri DuPree. They have five children together.

In August 2026, Bemis was accused of sexual misconduct by multiple underage fans. Shortly after, he postponed his then-upcoming tour, stating that he would be "[prioritizing] his mental health and personal well-being".

== Discography ==
=== With Say Anything ===
- Junior Varsity (EP, 2000)
- Baseball: An Album by Sayanything (2001)
- Menorah/Majora (EP, 2003)
- ...Is a Real Boy (2004)
- In Defense of the Genre (2007)
- Say Anything (2009)
- Anarchy, My Dear (2012)
- Hebrews (2014)
- I Don't Think It Is (2016)
- Oliver Appropriate (2019)
- ...Is Committed (2024)
- The Noise of Say Anything's Room Without... (2025)

=== With Perma ===
- Perma EP
- Two of a Crime (2013)
- Fight Fair (2019)
- Does Each Other (2022)

=== With Two Tongues ===
- Two Tongues (2009)
- Two Tongues Two (2016)

=== With Max Bemis and the Painful Splits ===
- Max Bemis and the Painful Splits (2010)
- Max Bemis and the Painful Splits 2 (2011)
- The Painful Splits Destroy (2012)
- The Painful Splits are Multiplying (2013)
- Max Bemis and the Painful Splits Stripped Down (2014)
- Max Bemis and the Painful Splits Wins (2016)

=== With Maxim Mental ===
- Make Team Presents Maxim Mental in Maximalism (2022)
