= Two Tongues (album) =

Studio album by Two Tongues
- Released: February 3, 2009
- Genres: Pop punk; indie rock; emo
- Label: Vagrant

Two Tongues chronology
Two Tongues (2009)	Two Tongues Two (2016)

Professional ratings
Review scores
Source	Rating
AllMusic	3/5 stars
Alternative Press	4.5/5 stars
Kerrang!	4/5 stars
Punknews.org	3.5/5 stars
Spin	3.5/5 stars

Two Tongues is the debut studio album by the American supergroup Two Tongues, released on February 3, 2009, by Vagrant Records.

== Track listing ==
No.	Title	Length
1.	"Crawl"	3:03
2.	"If I Could Make You Do Things"	3:00
3.	"Dead Lizard"	2:32
4.	"Interlude" (Vocals by Sherri DuPree of Eisley)	1:05
5.	"Tremors"	2:37
6.	"Silly Game"	2:54
7.	"Don’t You Want to Come Home"	2:45
8.	"Wowee Zowee"	2:29
9.	"Come On"	1:44
10.	"Alice"	3:10
11.	"Try Not to Save Me"	4:11
12.	"Back Against the Wall"	3:03
13.	"Even If You Don't" (Ween cover)	2:43

iTunes bonus tracks
No.	Title	Length
14.	"Third Engine" (Acoustic, covered by Max Bemis)	4:11
15.	"Every Man Has a Molly" (Acoustic, covered by Chris Conley)	2:49
