= The Man in Me =

Song by Bob Dylan

from the album New Morning
- Released: October 19, 1970
- Recorded: June 5, 1970
- Studio: Columbia, New York City
- Genre: Roots rock
- Length: 3:10
- Label: Columbia
- Songwriter: Bob Dylan
- Producer: Bob Johnston

"The Man in Me" is a song written by American singer-songwriter Bob Dylan and released as the tenth track on his 1970 album New Morning.

== Reception and legacy ==
Rolling Stone placed the song 84th on a list of the "100 Greatest Bob Dylan Songs of All Time". An article accompanying the list noted that it possesses a "raggedly euphoric power" and that "Dylan has rarely sounded as joyful as he does during the 'la la la' intro" while "gospel-tinged backup vocals add to the lyrics’ sense of unguarded intimacy and deliverance in hard times".

Nation of Language's Ian Devaney cited it as his favorite Dylan song in a 2021 Stereogum article, writing, "The main reason this song sticks with me is the three-note descension on the line 'nearly any task' and how endlessly satisfying it is. In a song about finally allowing someone into the part of yourself that you keep from the world, these simple steps feel like an exhalation. The instruments spend most of the song playfully dancing and weaving but these three big notes feel like crashing into a chair and taking a moment to appreciate that you’re capable of being vulnerable and happy".

== In other media ==
The song is most notably featured in the soundtrack to the 1998 Coen Brothers film The Big Lebowski. It plays during the stylized opening title sequence and during the hallucination sequence after the Dude is punched and his rug stolen. More recently it has been performed live by the film's star, Jeff Bridges, at Lebowski Fest, an audience-participation oriented event commemorating the film.

The song was featured in The Simpsons episode "The Town" during a bowling montage (likely in reference to The Big Lebowski).

The song was featured in the soundtrack to the 2013 documentary The Smash Brothers, highlighting the career of Ken Hoang and paying homage to The Big Lebowski.

The song was also used in S04E17 of How I Met Your Mother.

The song was used in a lighthearted ad series from Rocket Mortgage by Quicken Loans.

The song is featured in the 2020 movie The Mauritanian.

The song appears in season 3, episode 3 of Sex Education when Eric, Adam, Otis and Ruby go bowling.

== Notable covers ==
In 1971, the song was covered by Lonnie Mack on his album The Hills of Indiana. That same year, the Persuasions featured the song a capella on their album Street Corner Symphony, and regularly in their live performances. In 1975, it was covered by London reggae band Matumbi, with another reggae version recorded by Joe Cocker the following year. The song was also covered by the Clash during sessions for the album that was to become London Calling (1979). It is available on The Vanilla Tapes. More recently, it was covered by alternative rock group Say Anything; a demo version of the cover features Chris Conley (of Saves the Day) on vocals. The song was sampled heavily in the closing track of Blarf's 2019 album Cease & Desist, "The Me in Me." It has also been covered by Al Kooper, David Bazan (who regularly plays it live), Jenoah, Vandaveer, Buffalo Tom, and My Morning Jacket. The song was covered by Emma Swift on her 2020 album Blonde on the Tracks. It was covered on McKendree Spring's 1972 album Tracks.

== Live performances ==
Dylan played the song 155 times in concert between 1978 and 2011. It is the most frequently performed live song from New Morning.
