= Equal Vision Records =

American record label

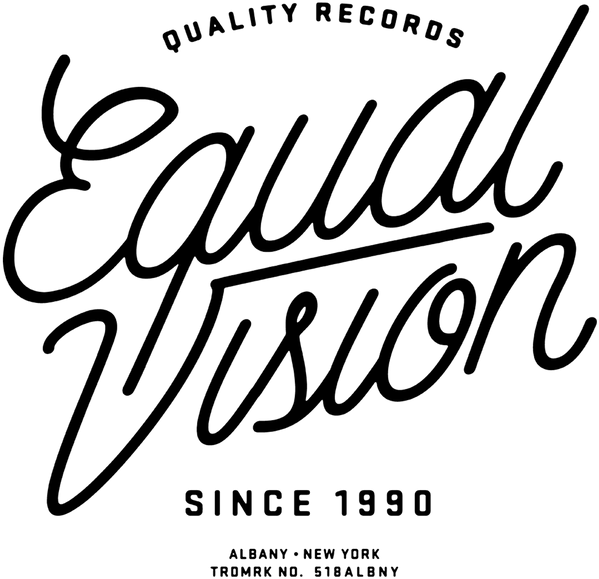
- Founded: 1990
- Founder: Ray Cappo
- Distributors: The Orchard (United States); UNFD (Australia/New Zealand)
- Genre: Post-hardcore; punk rock; experimental rock; emo; progressive rock; math rock; alternative rock; indie rock; metalcore; hardcore punk
- Country of origin: United States
- Location: Albany, New York
- Official website: www.equalvision.com

Equal Vision Records is an independent record label based in Albany, New York. It was founded in the early 1990s by Ray Cappo, the singer for the punk bands Youth of Today, Shelter, and Better Than a Thousand.

Initially, the label existed solely to distribute Shelter and other Krishna releases. In 1992, label manager Steve Reddy acquired Equal Vision from Cappo. The focus of the label expanded, bringing a wider variety of bands on board. According to Punk News, the mid-to-late '90s witnessed a renewed emphasis on hardcore efforts at Equal Vision, with notable signings such as One King Down and Ten Yard Fight. By the end of the '90s, Equal Vision Records (EVR) had built a stable of hardcore and punk bands, adding Bane, Trial, Converge, and Saves the Day to its roster in the latter part of the decade.

== Sublabels and distribution ==
In July 2009, EVR established a sub-label named Mantralogy, which features bands that "deliver edgy, Krishna-conscious music."

In 2012, EVR artist Max Bemis (of Say Anything) created an imprint label named Rory Records, which is distributed by EVR. On June 19, it was announced that Equal Vision Records would form a partnership with Casey Crescenzo of the Dear Hunter, giving him his own imprint label: Cave & Canary Goods.

EVR returned its distribution of physical and digital releases in the U.S. to RED Distribution as of January 23, 2012, after many years with Alternative Distribution Alliance. In May 2013, EVR inked a partnership with UNFD to manufacture, promote, and distribute EVR releases in Australia and New Zealand. Prior to this partnership, EVR had shared several artists with UNFD for distribution in both regions, including Say Anything, We Came as Romans, and House vs. Hurricane.

Velocity Records was originally established in 2009 as a subsidiary of Rise Records. It was relaunched in 2016 as a partner of Equal Vision Records.

In May 16, 2025, Hail the Sun vocalist Donovan Melero announced on social media that his record label, kill iconic records, are in a partnership deal with Equal Vision Records along with the announcement of their new signed artist Dwellings.

== Artists ==
=== Current ===
- A Lot Like Birds
- Acceptance
- Anberlin
- Anchor & Braille
- Anthony Raneri
- Armor for Sleep
- As Cities Burn
- Dead American
- The Dear Hunter (Cave & Canary Goods)
- Donovan Melero
- Destroy Rebuild Until God Shows
- DIV3R
- Fairweather
- The Flatliners
- Kaonashi
- Hail the Sun
- Hopesfall
- Hot Water Music
- House Parties
- The Juliana Theory
- Mae
- Murals
- Museum Mouth (EVR/Rory Records)
- Night Verses (Graphic Nature)
- No Devotion
- The Number Twelve Looks Like You
- Neil Rubenstein
- Saves the Day
- Shallow Pools
- Silent Drive
- Sparta
- Texas in July
- Thomas Erak & The Ouroboros
- The Vaughns

=== kill iconic records ===
- Ahh-ceh
- Dwellings
- Lobby Boxer
- Mella
- Moondough
- Resilia

=== Velocity Records ===
- And So I Watch You from Afar
- Eve 6
- If I Die First
- Nemophila
- No Devotion
- Craig Owens
- Scary Kids Scaring Kids
- Secrets
- Terror
- Thursday

=== Former ===
- 108 (active on Deathwish, Inc.)
- Alexisonfire (active with Dine Alone Records)
- Alive in Wild Paint (disbanded 2009)
- Antoine and Dead Kelly (disbanded 2014)
- As Friends Rust
- Bane (disbanded 2016)
- Be Well
- Bear vs. Shark (disbanded 2005)
- Being As An Ocean (active with SharpTone Records)
- Better Off
- BoySetsFire
- Breaking Pangaea
- Brian Marquis
- Burn
- Chiodos (active with SharpTone Records)
- Cinematic Sunrise (disbanded 2009)
- Circa Survive (on hiatus)
- Closure in Moscow
- Coheed and Cambria (active with Roadrunner Records)
- Coldfront
- The Color Fred (active with Heading East Records)
- Converge (active with Epitaph Records)
- Copper
- Codeseven
- Come and Rest
- Crown of Thornz
- Damiera
- Davenport Cabinet (disbanded 2016)
- The Dear & Departed
- Dear and the Headlights (disbanded 2011)
- Drowningman
- Dustin Kensrue
- Earth Crisis (active with Candlelight)
- Eisley
- Envy on the Coast
- The Fall of Troy (active, unsigned)
- Fear Before (on hiatus)
- Fivespeed (active with Sunset Alliance)
- For All I Am (active, unsigned)
- Gatherers (active with No Sleep Records)
- Gatsby's American Dream
- Gideon (active with Sumerian Records)
- Give Up the Ghost
- Glass Cloud (inactive)
- Good Clean Fun (active with Reflections Records)
- Goodbye Tomorrow
- H_{2}O (active with Bridge 9 Records)
- Hands Tied
- The Hope Conspiracy (active with Deathwish Records)
- Hot Cross
- House vs. Hurricane
- Household
- I the Mighty (on hiatus)
- Isles & Glaciers (disbanded 2010)
- Jonah Matranga
- Kurt Travis (active with Esque Records)
- Liars Academy (active with Goodwill Records)
- Matt Pryor
- Modern Life is War (active with Iodine Recordings)
- New End Original
- One King Down
- Orbs
- OWEL
- Patton Thomas (solo and as a member of Antoine and Dead Kelly)
- Pierce the Veil (active with Fearless Records)
- Polyphia (active with Rise Records)
- Portugal. The Man (active with Thirty Tigers)
- The Prize Fighter Inferno
- Refused
- The Rocking Horse Winner
- Say Anything (active with Rory Records)
- Seemless
- Serpico
- Shelter (active with Good Life Recordings)
- Sick of It All (active on Century Media)
- Set It Off (active, unsigned)
- Sky Eats Airplane (inactive)
- Sleep On It (disbanded 2020)
- The Snake the Cross the Crown
- Snapcase
- The Sound of Animals Fighting (inactive)
- Stolas (disbanded)
- The Stryder
- Ten Yard Fight
- This Day Forward
- This Time Next Year (disbanded 2012)
- Therefore I Am
- Time in Malta
- Trial (active with Panic Records)
- Two Tongues
- Until the End
- Vaux
- Vinnie Caruana
- Waterparks (active, unsigned)
- We Came as Romans (active with SharpTone Records)
- William Beckett
- Weerd Science (active with Super Rap Records)
- Wild Orchid Children
- Yellowcard (active with Better Noise Music)
- YouInSeries

== Mantralogy bands ==
- Gaura Vani & As Kindred Spirits
- Jahnavi Harrison

== See also ==
- List of record labels
