= ...Is a Real Boy =

Studio album by Say Anything
- Released: August 3, 2004
- Recorded: 2003–2004
- Genres: Emo; indie rock; pop punk; punk rock
- Length: 57:55
- Label: Doghouse
- Producers: Max Bemis, Tim O'Heir, Stephen Trask

Say Anything chronology
For Sale... (2004)	...Is a Real Boy (2004)	In Defense of the Genre (2007)

Singles from ...Is a Real Boy
- 1. "Alive with the Glory of Love" Released: September 11, 2006; 2. "Wow, I Can Get Sexual Too" Released: January 30, 2007

...Is a Real Boy is the second studio album by American rock band Say Anything, released on August 3, 2004.

== Recording ==
On January 27, 2003, the band announced they had signed to Doghouse Records; shortly after, they recorded demos for their next album, which was expected to be released later in the year. The following month, vocalist Max Bemis and drummer Coby Linder were in the process of recruiting members to help them tour. With tremendous self-created pressure, Bemis threw himself into pushing the sonic boundaries of the band and maturing their sound, incorporating elements of math-rock, indie-pop and theatrical pomp. He and Linder also started the search for a producer. The two met several producers but eventually decided on Tim O'Heir and Stephen Trask. Bemis struggled with different ideas for the record and decided the album should focus on "the artistic struggle, the fact that every creative person has this sick ambition to affect some sort of change in society with their art, to be more than just a guy in a band or a poet or a sculptor." According to the album's liner notes, ...Is a Real Boy was originally intended to be a rock opera, complete with a full narrative, cast of characters and spoken word interludes between each song. One tentative title for the album was Zona! Zona! However, Bemis became overwhelmed by the entire process of writing and playing most of the instruments and had a breakdown.

"I literally lost my mind while we were recording," stated Bemis regarding the breakdown. The breakdown was precipitated by a mockumentary discussed by Bemis and O'Heir. Bemis' condition led him to believe he was being secretly filmed for the mockumentary; the situation culminated in him walking the streets of Brooklyn thinking he was being filmed while encountering friends (who were actually strangers). After recovering, Bemis decided to focus solely on the music and dropped the idea of a script. Around July 2003, the band began recording ...Is a Real Boy, their first album with Doghouse Records. Bemis said the two people he wanted to "outdo with ...Is a Real Boy were Andy Warhol and Jesus." In addition to working with O'Heir and Trask, Say Anything worked with Forrest Kline (of power pop band Hellogoodbye) to record the For Sale... EP, released in 2004. The band also worked with ECA Records to record a promotional album that was never released.

== Release ==
On April 13, 2004, ...Is a Real Boy was announced for release in four months' time. Alongside this, "Belt", "Woe", "Alive with the Glory of Love", and "Admit It!!!" were made available for streaming through the band's website. The following month, the band appeared on a handful of dates on the Honda Civic Tour. In June and July 2004, the band toured with Audio Karate, Lances Hero, and MC Lars. ...Is a Real Boy was released on August 3, 2004, through Doghouse Records. A promotional 7" vinyl to be released via ECA Records (originally on July 15, 2003) and a split EP were planned. Neither was released, although both tracks from the vinyl, an acoustic version of "Belt" along with "You Help Them" (from Menorah/Majora) can be downloaded from Anything's online forum.

In October and November 2004, the band went on tour with Hot Rod Circuit, Northstar and Straylight Run. In February and March 2005, the group toured with Recover, Armor for Sleep, and Case Pagan. They then appeared at The Bamboozle festival the following month. Say Anything then toured with Circa Survive and Emanuel beginning in June 2005, and was expected to last until August 2005. On July 11, 2005, the rest of the tour had been cancelled, with Bemis explaining he had "full on paranoid delusions which could have really screwed me up". The band were due to support Saves the Day and Senses Fail on their co-headlining US tour between October and December 2005, but had to cancel because of Bemis' continual breakdown.

During the initial release of the album, ...Is a Real Boy managed to sell 20,000 copies independently, which attracted major label attention. Sony Music Entertainment-imprint J Records signed the band and was planning to reissue ...Is a Real Boy in October 2005. "Wow, I Can Get Sexual Too" was posted on the band's Myspace profile on November 25, 2005. The reissue was delayed to January 2006, and eventually saw release in February 2006. The bonus disc included with the reissue, ...Was a Real Boy, features seven tracks that were originally from an eight-track EP known unofficially as the Say Anything vs. AIDS demos. As noted in the reissue's liner notes, the EP, which was recorded in Kevin Seaton's garage, was scrapped by Bemis as he did not feel the band was popular enough to sufficiently support such a cause.

On February 15, 2006, the music video for "Alive with the Glory of Love" was posted online. Between March and May 2006, Say Anything went on a cross-country tour of the US alongside Pistolita and the Bled. The trek included an appearance at The Bamboozle festival. "Alive with the Glory of Love" was released to radio on June 20, 2006. Following this, Say Anything supported Dashboard Confessional on their headlining US tour in July and August 2006. In October and November 2006, the band went on tour with Brand New, MewithoutYou and Piebald. "Wow, I Can Get Sexual Too" was released to radio on January 30, 2007. A second reissue came in the form of vinyl edition released on October 23, 2007, which included an extra track, "Walk Through Hell", originally from the Menorah/Majora EP. Doghouse Records released the third re-issue of the album on October 7, 2008.

== Critical reception ==
Professional ratings
Review scores
Source	Rating
AbsolutePunk.net	99%
AllMusic	4.5/5 stars
Blender	3.5/5 stars
Entertainment Weekly	B+
Melodic	3/5 stars
Punknews.org	(2004) (2006)
Rolling Stone	3/5 stars
Sputnikmusic	5/5 stars
Yahoo! Music	Favorable

...Is a Real Boy has received almost universally positive reviews from music critics. AbsolutePunk.net reviewer Jason Tate awarded the album a 99% rating and praised the band's writing, saying "By the second song it is perceptible that the band has a grasp on crafting songs that do not follow a formula, or insult the listener by maintaining a hold on one particular style or sound." Allmusic's Corey Apar also gave the album a glowing review, writing "...Is a Real Boy comes off as an impressively well-done, multifaceted effort that deserves multiple spins and makes Say Anything truly a band to watch." Punk News noted that the album seems to be commenting in the over-use of irony in the emo scene, writing "Yes, this album is highly ironic in that it's critical of the scene it's categorized in and it's an album about a band and there are songs in here that are about songs. But, Bemis's overall quirkiness makes it work." Entertainment Weekly wrote that, "Say Anything, an emo act based in L.A., has a new disc that proves that the genre can be artful and intriguing."

BuzzFeed included the album at number 19 on their "36 Pop Punk Albums You Need To Hear Before You F——ing Die" list. "Alive with the Glory of Love" appeared on a best-of emo songs list by Vulture. Spartanburg Herald-Journal include the album on their list of the best albums of the year. Rolling Stone ranked the album among the 40 greatest emo albums of all-time. Cleveland.com ranked "Alive with the Glory of Love" at number 39 on their list of the top 100 pop-punk songs. Alternative Press ranked "Wow, I Can Get Sexual Too" at number 58 and "Alive with the Glory of Love" at number 27 on their list of the best 100 singles from the 2000s.

== Track listing ==
=== Original release: ...Is a Real Boy ===
All tracks are written by Max Bemis with the exception of "Metal Now," which was written and composed by Bemis and Kevin Sachs (Casper Adams), according to the album's liner notes.

No.	Title	Length
1.	"Belt"	4:59
2.	"Woe"	3:55
3.	"The Writhing South"	4:46
4.	"Alive with the Glory of Love"	4:15
5.	"Yellow Cat (Slash) Red Cat"	5:18
6.	"The Futile"	2:45
7.	"Spidersong"	3:57
8.	"An Orgy of Critics"	3:55
9.	"Every Man Has a Molly"	3:05
10.	"Slowly, Through a Vector"	4:40
11.	"Chia-Like, I Shall Grow"	4:56
12.	"I Want to Know Your Plans"	5:12
13.	"Admit It!!!"	6:12

=== Re-issue bonus disc: ...Was a Real Boy ===
No.	Title	Length
1.	"Wow, I Can Get Sexual Too"	3:00
2.	"Little Girls"	3:53
3.	"Most Beautiful Plague"	4:53
4.	"It's a Metaphor, Fool"	2:51
5.	"Total Revenge"	3:27
6.	"Metal Now"	2:44
7.	"I Will Never Write an Obligatory Song About Being on the Road and Missing Someone"	3:49

=== Vinyl bonus track ===
No.	Title	Length
1.	"Walk Through Hell"	3:30

- This is a rerecording of an earlier version appearing on Menorah/Majora, and it also appears on the various artists compilations Punk the Clock 3 and Alternative Press Play, Vol. 1: Back to School.

== Chart performance ==
=== Album ===
Year	Chart	Position
2007	Top Heatseekers	8

=== Singles ===
Year	Single	Chart	Position
2006	Alive with the Glory of Love	Modern Rock Tracks	28

== Credits ==
According to the liner notes:

- Max Bemis – vocals, guitar, bass, keyboards
- Coby Linder – percussion, drums

Additional credits, also from the liner notes:

- Stephen Trask: additional keyboard and piano on ...Is a Real Boy
- Casey Prestwood – additional guitar and slide guitar on ...Is a Real Boy
- Casper Adams – vocals and guitar on "Metal Now"
- Ariel Rechtshaid: keyboard and programming on "Wow, I Can Get Sexual Too"
- Additional Vocals on ...Is a Real Boy: Caitlin Broderick, Patrick Carrie, Kyle Fischer, Robb MacLean, Robert Mann, Adrienne Pearson, Vanessa Peters, Blair Shehan, and Sierra Swan
- Gang vocals on ...Is a Real Boy: Casper Adams, Dan DeLauro, Aaron Farley, Carrick Moore Garety, Morgan Silver Greenberg, Paul Jeffrey, Tim O'Heir, Nick Panama, Austin Peters, Matt Rubin, Kevin Seaton, Bryan Sheffield, Claire Weiss, and Jeremy Weiss
