= Razia (name) =

Razia, Raziya (Persian: رَضِيَه) is a Persian feminine given name and an occasional surname which is Persianized and derived from the feminine form of the Arabic: "Radhiyyah", meaning "content, contented, pleased, satisfied". It may refer to the following people:

== Given name ==
- Razia Sirajuddin (1902–1969), Pakistani painter and musician
- Razia Rahimtoola (1919–1988), Pakistani pediatrician
- Razia Butt (1924–2012), Urdu novelist and playwright from Pakistan
- Razia Matin Chowdhury (1925–2012), Bangladeshi politician
- Razia Banu (1926–1998), Bangladeshi politician
- Razia Khan (1936–2011), Bangladeshi novelist
- Syeda Razia Faiz (1936–2013), Bangladeshi politician
- Razia Bhatti (1944–1996), Pakistani journalist
- Razia Jan (1944–2025), Afghan humanitarian
- Razia (singer) (born 1959), singer-songwriter from Madagascar
- Razia Iqbal (born 1962), BBC news journalist
- Ummey Razia Kajol (born 1966), Bangladeshi politician
- Razia Barakzai (born 1995), Afghan women's rights activist
- Razia Sultana, multiple people

== Surname ==
- Luiz Razia (born 1989), Brazilian racing driver
