= Razia =

Razia or Raziya may refer to

- Razia (name), a female given name from Arabic
- Razia (TV series) a Pakistani television miniseries
- Razia, fictional character portrayed by Shobha in the 1960 Indian film Barsaat Ki Raat

== See also ==
- Razzia (disambiguation)
- Razia Sultan (disambiguation)
- Raghuvinte Swantham Raziya, a 2011 Malayalam romantic drama film
- Razia's Shadow: A Musical, a 2008 album by Forgive Durden
