= Razzi =

Razzi may refer to:

- Golden Raspberry Awards, a parody award show
- Giovanni Antonio Bazzi (Il Sodoma; 1477–1549), Italian Renaissance painter whose surname is sometimes corrupted to "Razzi"

== See also ==
- Razzia (disambiguation)
- RAZZIE
