= Bandersnatch =

Fictional creature from Lewis Carroll's "Through the Looking-Glass"

- Alice character
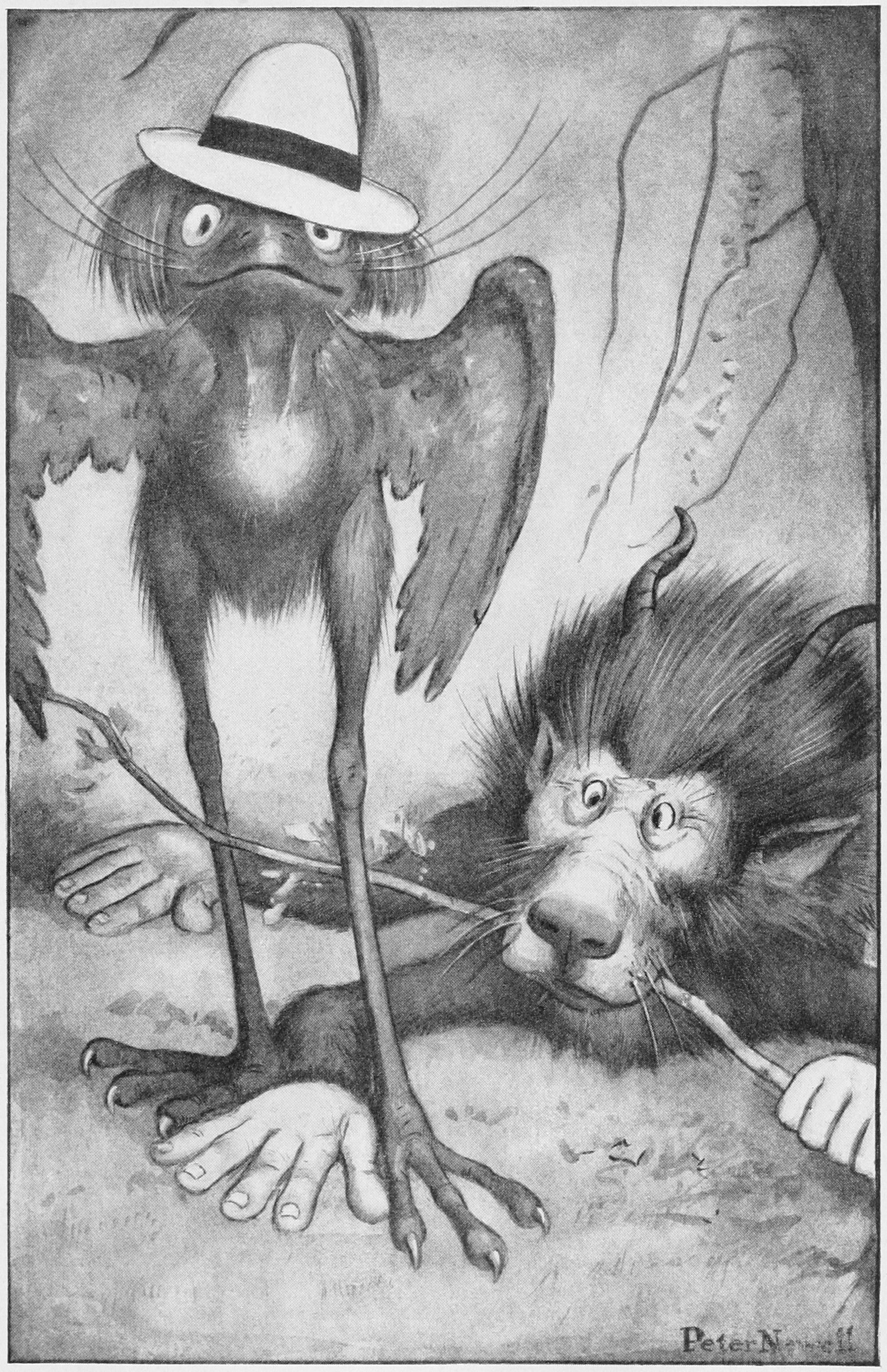
- Peter Newell's illustration of the Jubjub bird (left) and the Bandersnatch (right).
- First appearance: Through the Looking Glass
- Created by: Lewis Carroll

A bandersnatch is a fictional creature in Lewis Carroll's 1871 novel Through the Looking-Glass and his 1874 poem The Hunting of the Snark. Although neither work describes the appearance of a bandersnatch in great detail, in The Hunting of the Snark, it has a long neck and snapping jaws, and both works describe it as ferocious and extraordinarily fast. Through the Looking-Glass implies that bandersnatches may be found in the world behind the looking-glass, and in The Hunting of the Snark, a bandersnatch is found by a party of adventurers after crossing an ocean. Bandersnatches have appeared in various adaptations of Carroll's works; they have also been used in other authors' works and in other forms of media.

== Description ==
Carroll's first mention of a Bandersnatch, in the poem "Jabberwocky" (which appears in Through the Looking-Glass), is very brief: the narrator of the poem admonishes his son to "shun / The frumious Bandersnatch", the name describing the creature's fuming and furious character. Later in the novel, the White King says of his wife (the White Queen): "She runs so fearfully quick. You might as well try to catch a Bandersnatch!"

In "The Hunting of the Snark," while the party searches for the Snark, the Banker runs ahead and encounters a Bandersnatch:

And the Banker, inspired with a courage so new
It was matter for general remark,
Rushed madly ahead and was lost to their view
In his zeal to discover the Snark.

But while he was seeking with thimbles and care,
A Bandersnatch swiftly drew nigh
And grabbed at the Banker, who shrieked in despair,
For he knew it was useless to fly.

He offered large discount — he offered a cheque
(Drawn "to bearer") for seven-pounds-ten:
But the Bandersnatch merely extended its neck
And grabbed at the Banker again.

Without rest or pause — while those frumious jaws
Went savagely snapping around —
He skipped and he hopped, and he floundered and flopped,
Till fainting he fell to the ground.

The Bandersnatch fled as the others appeared
Led on by that fear-stricken yell:
And the Bellman remarked "It is just as I feared!"
And solemnly tolled on his bell.

== In other media ==
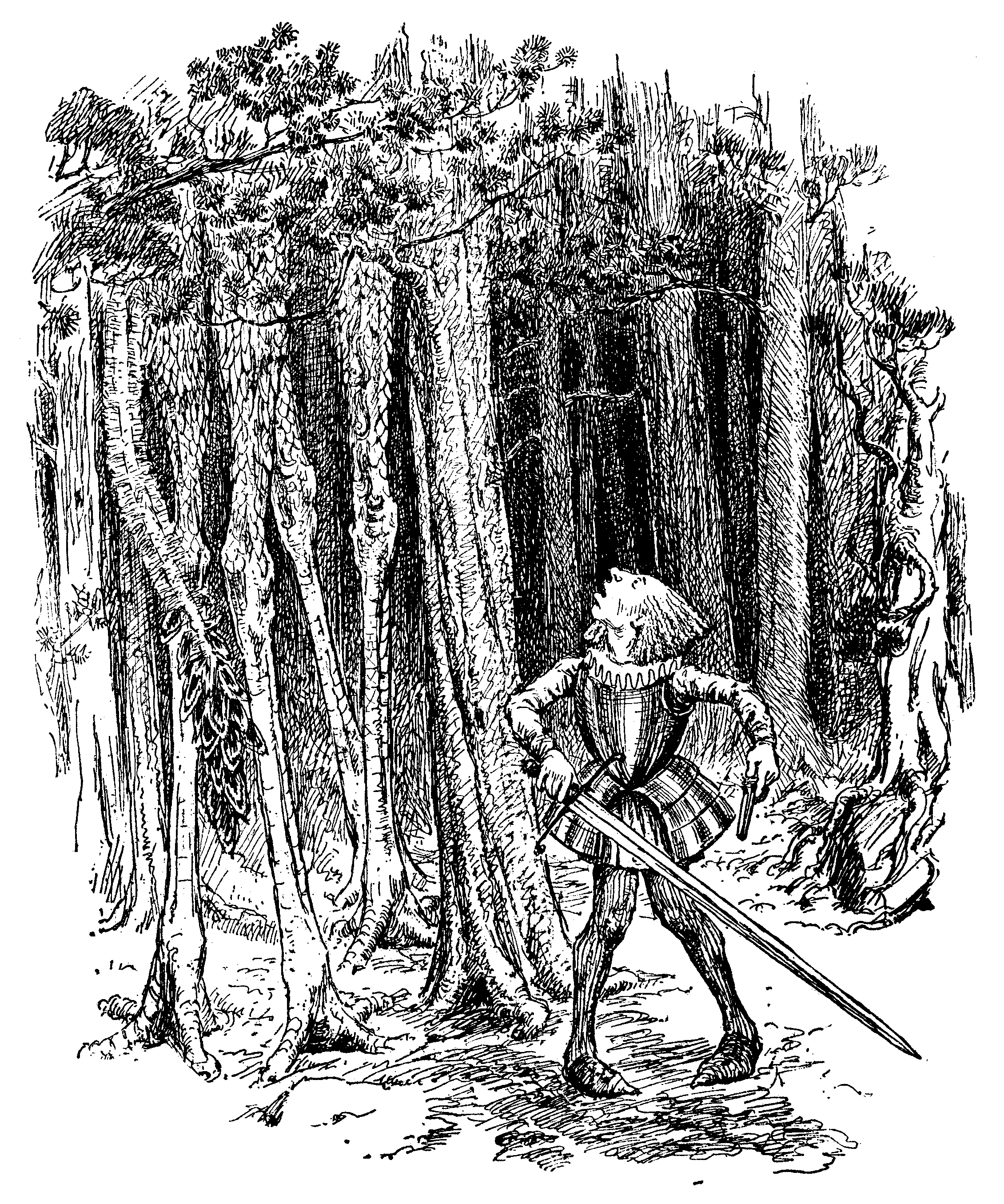
The Bandersnatch from Anna Matlack Richards' A New Alice in the Old Wonderland

=== Literature ===
- Anna Matlack Richards' A New Alice in the Old Wonderland (1895) contains a broader description given of the Bandersnatch within the poem Bandersnatchy. In this poem, another hero sets out to slay the Bandersnatch so as to gain respect from his people against the hero who slew the Jabberwock (a story he would sit and tell till after ten o'clock). The author writes that it is necessary to be armed with a vorpal sword or a winxy pistol, because one never can tell what a Bandersnatch might do. The hero describes the creature as being extremely long-legged with a long tail and the ability to fly. It could be understood that the Bandersnatch perhaps camouflages itself as a tree. Richards' daughter, Anna Richards Brewster, illustrated the hero's encounter with the Bandersnatch.
- In a letter from 1959, C. S. Lewis wrote, "No one ever influenced Tolkien – you might as well try to influence a bandersnatch."
- In Roger Zelazny's (1987) Sign of Chaos (part of Chronicles of Amber) the protagonist encounters a Bandersnatch. The creature is described as segmented, with a side-to-side gait, leaving a trail of steaming saliva, and hissing like a leaky pressure cooker.
- In Wilfrid Blunt's 1966 novel Omar, the character Omar is a hyrax who speaks English and certain dialects of horses and rhinoceroses. Omar claims that the word bandersnatch refers to hyraxes, and that the warning to "shun a bandersnatch" only pertains if it happens to be frumious.
- In Eric Nylund's 2006 Halo series novel Ghosts of Onyx, the code-name 'Bandersnatch' is used to warn UNSC troops for a radiological or energy-based disaster. It was previously used on occasions where Covenant troops had 'glassed' former human colonies.

=== Television and film ===
- In the 2010 film Alice in Wonderland, the bandersnatch appears as a large white beast somewhat resembling a mix of bulldog, snow leopard and bear with long fur, black spots, a long tail, and multiple rows of teeth. It is a creature under the control of the Red Queen until Alice returns its eye, which it had lost to the Dormouse. It helps Alice to escape and joins the White Queen's forces. In the video game adaptation of the film, it serves a similar role.
- The 2018 interactive film Black Mirror: Bandersnatch features an in-universe video game named Bandersnatch.

=== Music ===
- San Francisco psychedelic rock band Frumious Bandersnatch named themselves after Carroll's work.
- Seattle rock band Forgive Durden released a single entitled "Beware the Jubjub Bird and Shun the Frumious Bandersnatch!" (2006) from the album Wonderland.

=== Comics ===
- In the 2010 graphic novel Calamity Jack, sequel to Rapunzel's Revenge (published in 2006), the giant Blunderboar has a pet Bandersnatch named Lewis, presumably after Lewis Carroll. This Bandersnatch appears as a giant toadlike being with a massive mouth, two small mouths in place of eyes, a long froglike tongue, and the ability to spit acid. It is killed by the Jabblewocky [sic?].
- In Ursula Vernon's webcomic Digger, a bandersnatch appears as a two-headed, sentient, exiled draft animal.

=== Computer science ===
- Bandersnatches are the subject of a difficult algorithm design project for an apparently NP-complete problem in the academic theoretical computer science book by M. R. Garey and D. S. Johnson, Computers and Intractability: A Guide to the Theory of NP-Completeness.

=== Physical locations ===
- The minor planet 9780 Bandersnatch is named for the Bandersnatch.
