= Thomas Dutton (musician) =

American musician

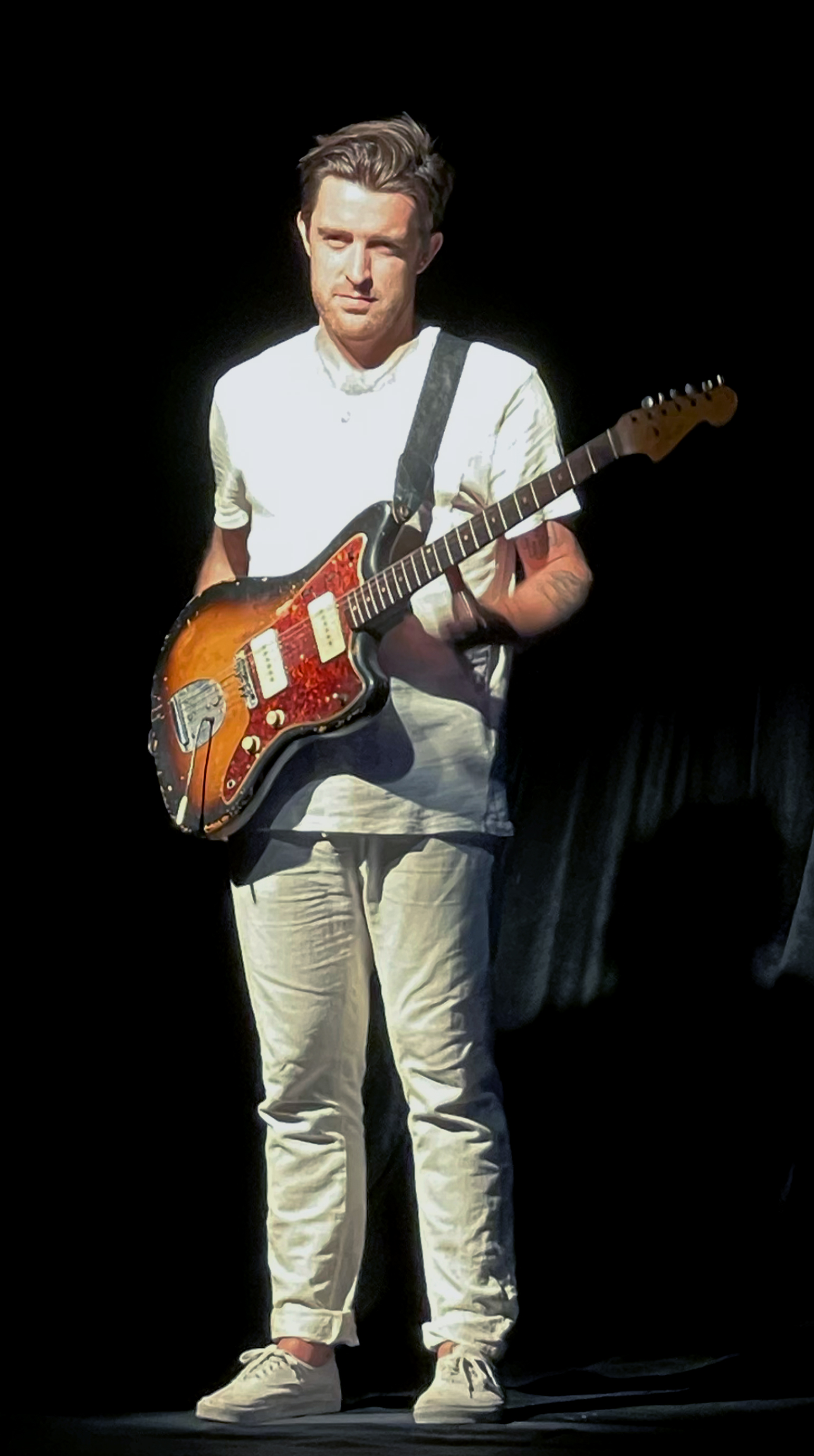

Background information
- Born: 1985 (age 40–41); Bellevue, Washington, United States
- Genres: Indie pop; synth pop; alternative rock; emo
- Occupations: Singer, songwriter, producer
- Instrument: Guitar
- Years active: 2003–present
- Member of: Only Twin
- Formerly of: Forgive Durden; Cardiknox
- Spouse: Samantha Dutton
- Website: www.only-twin.com

Thomas Dutton (born 1985) is an American musician, singer, songwriter, and record producer. He is best known as the founder and frontman of the indie rock band Forgive Durden, one half of the indie pop duo Cardiknox, and his current solo project Only Twin.

== Early life and career ==
Dutton grew up in Bellevue, Washington. He began playing guitar around age 10-11 when his father bought a guitar for his younger brother Paul. Dutton was heavily influenced by Disney movies as a child, particularly Aladdin, which inspired his love of music and performance. He has a Little Mermaid tattoo thanks to the influence that Disney had on him.

From middle school onward, Dutton was involved in various bands. He was strongly influenced by the local Seattle music scene, attending shows by local musical groups such as Gatsbys American Dream. In high school, he formed the band Forgive Durden, and later dropped out of college at University of Washington to pursue music full-time.

== Career ==
=== Forgive Durden (2003–2010) ===
Dutton founded the indie rock band Forgive Durden in Seattle in 2003. The band was named after the character Tyler Durden from the novel and film Fight Club, reflecting Dutton's interest in the idea of challenging societal norms.

In 2005, Forgive Durden signed to Fueled by Ramen records, joining a roster that included successful acts like Fall Out Boy, Paramore, and Panic! at the Disco. They released their debut full-length album Wonderland on May 9, 2006. The album explored themes of capitalism, greed and corruption through a fictional "Wonderland" setting.

In January 2008, Dutton announced that the other three members had left the band due to personality conflicts. He continued Forgive Durden as a solo project, recruiting various guest musicians for recordings and live performances.

=== Razia's Shadow: A Musical (2008) ===
Dutton released Forgive Durden's second and final album, Razia's Shadow: A Musical, on October 28, 2008 through Fueled by Ramen. The ambitious concept album was conceived by Dutton and co-written with his brother Paul.

Razia's Shadow is a rock opera that tells the story of a world divided in two by the selfish actions of a powerful and egotistical angel named Ahrima. After generations of darkness, the world is eventually brought back together by the love and sacrifice of a couple, Adakias and Anhura, who are brave enough to fulfill their destinies.

The album features an extensive cast of guest vocalists from various bands in the indie and emo scenes, including members of Panic! at the Disco, Say Anything, Saves The Day, Portugal. The Man, and others. Dutton cited influences from musical films such as Willy Wonka and the Chocolate Factory, Moulin Rouge!, Newsies, and Disney animated musicals for the project.

Razia's Shadow gained a cult following and has been adapted into various formats, including a 2012 live performance led by Dutton at Joe's Pub in New York City, and a 2019 puppet show version at Phantom Chorus Theatre.

On September 10, 2010, Forgive Durden played what was billed as their final hometown show in Seattle, performing their debut album Wonderland in full.

=== Cardiknox (2013–2018) ===
In 2013, Dutton formed the indie pop duo Cardiknox with singer Lonnie Angle. The two had met through mutual friends in Seattle and initially worked together to adapt Dutton's Razia's Shadow album into an off-Broadway theater production. During this time, Dutton and Angle also began dating.

After moving to New York City to focus on the theater project, the couple began writing pop songs together and formed Cardiknox. The band name was a play on Dutton's mother's maiden name, Cardinaux.

Cardiknox signed with Warner Bros. Records in 2015. They released their debut album Portrait on March 11, 2016. The album was produced by Grammy-winning producer John Shanks and marked a shift towards a more electronic, synth-pop sound for Dutton.

Cardiknox toured extensively, including opening for Carly Rae Jepsen on her Gimmie Love Tour in 2016. The duo gained attention for their energetic live performances and music videos, including "On My Way," which featured the pair dancing through the streets of downtown Los Angeles.

On December 7, 2018, Cardiknox released their final song "Back in L.A." and announced the end of the project on social media.

=== Only Twin (2021–present) ===
In 2021, Dutton launched his solo project Only Twin with the release of the album Rare Works. The album explored the dissolution of his relationship and the end of Cardiknox, marking a return to a more personal and introspective songwriting style.

On July 19, 2024, Dutton released his second album as Only Twin, titled It Feels Nice to Burn. The album chronicled his journey of moving on, falling in love with his wife, and getting married. It featured collaborations with artists like Emilia Ali on the track "Pool Day" and continued to blend indie pop sensibilities with more experimental production techniques.

Chorus.fm described It Feels Nice to Burn as finding "the sweet spot between left-of-center indie pop and dreamy rock."

Dutton released several singles from the album, "Pool Day," "Thirty Minutes," and "Love of a Lifetime," which Paste Magazine called "synth-pop at its finest, ... turning catchy melodies into idyllic, reachable, simple dreams."

The album's fourth single, "Give You Up," was accompanied by a uniquely conceptual music video directed by Josh Martin and Ryan McNeeley (The Director Brothers) and featuring dancer Julianne Hough and actor Flula Borg. The video portrays a love story between a human (played by Hough) and a copy machine, inspired by Dutton's observations of food delivery robots navigating city sidewalks near his home.

== Personal life ==
Dutton married his wife Samantha Dutton in 2022 and they have a son who was born in December 2023. He currently resides in Los Angeles, California.

== Discography ==
- With Forgive Durden:
  - Wonderland (2006)
  - Razia's Shadow: A Musical (2008)
- With Cardiknox:
  - Portrait (2016)
- As Only Twin:
  - Rare Works (2021)
  - It Feels Nice to Burn (2024)

== See also ==
- Forgive Durden
- Cardiknox
