= Hunter Brown (disambiguation) =

Hunter Brown is an American baseball pitcher.

Hunter Brown may also refer to:

- Hunter Brown (book series)
- Hunter Brown, musician with Sound Tribe Sector 9
