= Jubjub bird =

Fictional character by Lewis Carroll

Jubjub Bird
- Alice character
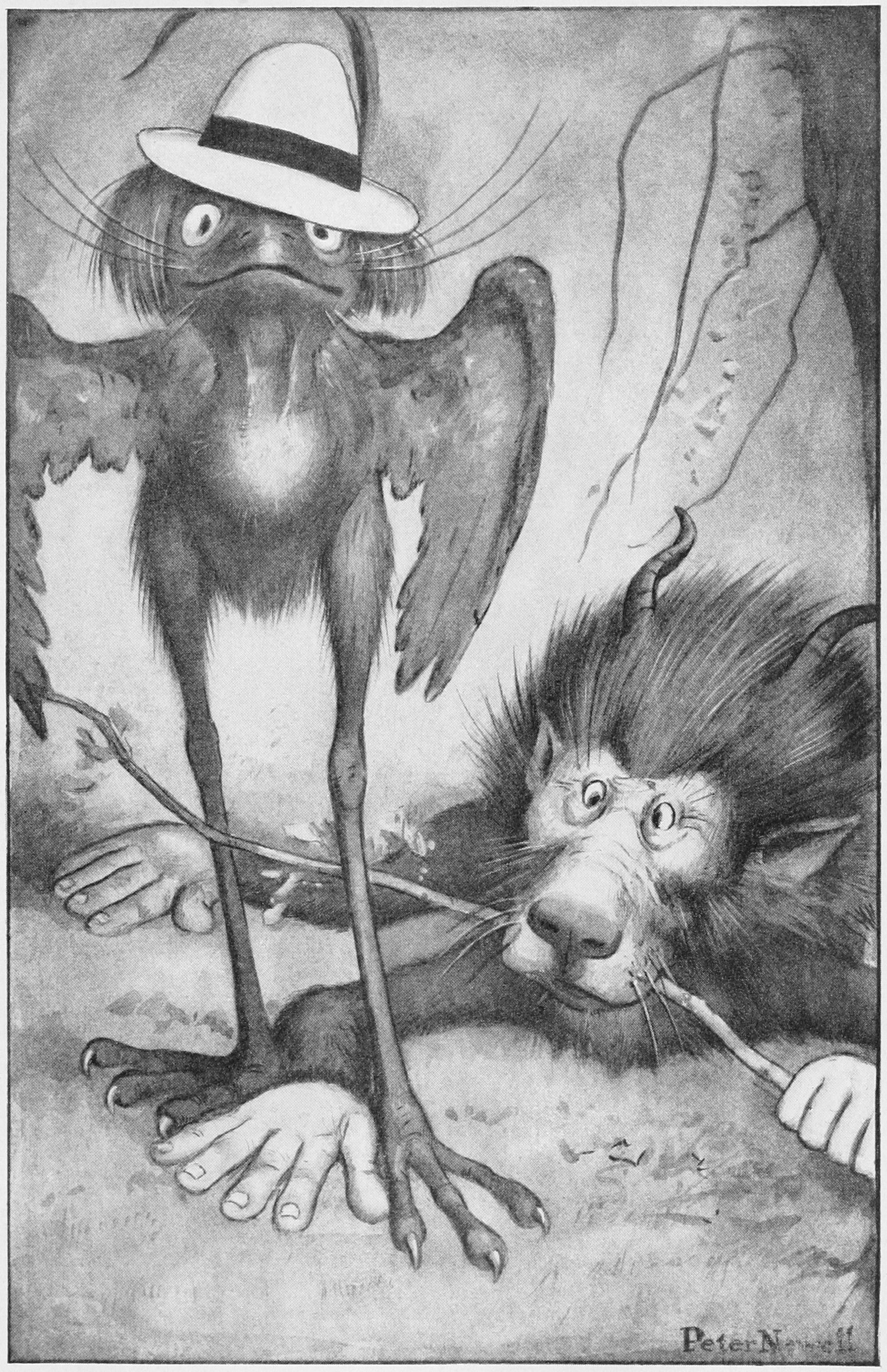
- Jubjub bird (left) with the Bandersnatch (right)
- First appearance: Through the Looking Glass
- Created by: Lewis Carroll

In-universe information
- Species: Bird

The Jubjub bird is a dangerous creature mentioned in Lewis Carroll's nonsense poems "Jabberwocky" (1871) and "The Hunting of the Snark" (1876).

In "Jabberwocky," the only detail given about the bird is that the protagonist should "beware" it. In The Hunting of the Snark, however, the creature is described in much greater depth. It is found in a narrow, dark, depressing and isolated valley. Its voice when heard is described as "a scream, shrill and high" like a pencil squeaking on a slate, and significantly scares those who hear it, including the Beaver, who "turn[s] pale to the tip of its tail." Its character traits include that it is "desperate" and "lives in perpetual passion;" it "knows any friend it has met once before" and will not "look at a bribe."

== Tim Burton's Alice in Wonderland ==
The Jubjub bird appears in Tim Burton's 2010 version of Alice in Wonderland as a giant black bird resembling a cross between a vulture and a speckled chicken with a red head crest, a long yellow beak and a blue tongue. It is first seen when it captures both Tweedledum and Tweedledee while trying to escape with Alice. It is not seen again until the Red Queen releases the Jubjub Bird onto a rebellious crowd. During the final battle, after the Mad Hatter's interference the Jubjub bird joins to fight for the Red Queen, only to later have its head crushed by a giant boulder from a catapult.

== Other appearances ==
The Bluetones recorded a song titled "The Jub-Jub Bird", which was released in 1998 on their second album Return to the Last Chance Saloon.

The song "Alpenglow" by Nightwish on the 2015 album Endless Forms Most Beautiful includes the line "together we slay another fright, every Jubjub bird, spooks of the past".

Saydisc Records, in 1978, on SDL294, released 'Parlour Poetry'. All the verse was spoken by Kenneth Williams. Jabberwocky was one of four Lewis Carroll pieces included. 'The Walrus and the Carpenter'; 'You are Old, Father William'; and 'Hiawatha's Photographing', were the others.

The minor planet 9781 Jubjubbird is named for the Jubjub bird.

Indie rock band Forgive Durden released a song named "Beware the Jubjub Bird and Shun the Frumious Bandersnatch" on their 2006 album Wonderland, which features other songs inspired by the works of Lewis Carroll.
