= Hunter Brown (book series) =

Series of Christian fantasy books

Hunter Brown is a series of Christian fantasy books about a troubled teen named Hunter Brown, an eighteen year-old boy who joins a group called Dani's Merchants and fights an enemy called the Beluga. The first book was released in 2008, the second in the fall of 2009, and the third and final book was released in the winter of 2011. The books are written by two brothers, Christopher and Allan Miller.

== About the Books ==
The books are written in the first person, narrated by Hunter Brown. They are written by two brothers, Christopher and Alan Miller. The Miller Brothers are both CG animators, and they included digitally drawn illustrations in their books.

== Plot ==
=== Book 2: The Consuming Fire ===
After returning from his first trip to Solandria, Hunter Brown finds himself deserted by his best friends, but with memories of his adventures and many unanswered questions. He returns to school in the fall, where his tendency to think he is being trailed by the Shadow lands him in a heap of trouble. Soon, Hunter takes a wild ride to Solandria with new friends, only to find the Codebearers scattered and the Resistance weakened. Led by a mysterious flame, Hunter, Trista, and Rob begin their quest to find the seven mentioned in the Author's Writ. But they face a brutal adversary, Xaul, who threatens to destroy all that remains of the Resistance.

=== Book 3: The Eye of Ends ===
In Hunter Brown and The Eye of Ends, the heart-pounding conclusion of Hunter's previous adventures begins with an even bigger surprise—his memory is gone. With no knowledge of his last visit to Solandria, Hunter must fight to piece together the growing puzzle of his past under the constant surveillance of an intimidating detective, who is more than what he seems. But what begins as a harmless search for memories quickly leads him into a deadly hunt for his missing father and a lost relic said to predict the story's end. Answers lie in the Eye of Ends, but one question remains: can the Eye be trusted? Will Hunter succeed in finding his father, or will the mysterious Watcher erase everything Hunter has fought for and everyone he loves, before the final page is turned?

=== Video Game ===
A video game based on the Codebearers series is currently being developed that is to be called "The CodeBearer's Continuum. There is supposed to be a book released around the time of the video game that goes along with the game. Rumors say that the book supposed to be by the same name as the video game. The release date for both are currently unknown.

== Main characters ==
- Author: The mysterious, unseen writer of worlds. An allegory of God.
- Aviad: The son of the Author and founder of the Resistance. He appears to be an old man in the first book, where he sacrifices himself to save Hunter from the Bloodstone curse. In the second book, he reveals that he is alive again, and he looks much younger. An allegory of Jesus Christ.
- Belac: A swamp troll who captured Hunter and Stretch in the first book. In the third book Hunter found that Belac was actually his father, Caleb Brown, under a curse.
- Boojum: A cute, furry, mischievous creature later revealed to be a snark. A reference to Lewis Carroll's poem, The Hunting of the Snark.
- Caleb: Hunter's father, a character reminiscent of Darth Vader. He abandoned his family and went to Solandria when Hunter was twelve. After serving the Resistance for a time, he deserted and began playing God. A parasite took over his brain at this time, turning him into the troll Belac. After Caleb was freed from his Belac form, he was forced to join the watcher Tonomis, and the two of them came together to form a giant monster called a "titan". After Hunter destroys the titan, his father is redeemed, but dies shortly afterwards.
- Cranton: A bully at Hunter's school whose life Hunter saves in the second book.
- Desi: A Shadow agent who betrays Hunter in Eye of Ends and also kisses him. She is called a "Vicess".
- Emily: Hunter's snobbish sister. Her relationship with Hunter improves in Eye of Ends.
- Ephriam: A codebearer captain from the shard of Abiosis who only appears in the first book.
- Evan: A messenger from beyond the veil. He comes in The Secret of the Shadow and at the end of the Eye of Ends.
- Faldyn: A suspicious codebearer captain from the shard of Perga. In The Secret of the Shadow Faldyn's mysterious demeanor and consorting with the enemy lead the other codebearers to suspect that he is actually working with the Shadow. This is confirmed in The Consuming Fire, where he kidnaps Hope. His motives are shown to be good in Eye of Ends, where Faldyn tells Hunter he is Hope's father.
- Gabby: An elder member of the codebearer resistance. Also Cranton's grandmother. Gerwyn's wife.
- Gerwyn: Gabby's husband.
- Hope: A virtuess who has a special relationship with Hunter. She seems to die at the end of book one, only to be revealed alive again in book two, where she truly does die, but is then brought back to life.
- Hunter: The main character, a high school student who joins the codebearer resistance.
- Kane: A gorewing Shadow commander who is presumably killed in The Consuming Fire.
- Kim: Rob's father. He is highly skilled with the Code of Life. In "Eye of the Ends", he makes a codebearer club in the end after the big fight.
- Leo: A codebearer captain from the shard of Tepi.
- Petrov: A captain from the shard of Obduront, commander of the codebearers until his death in book two.
- Philan: Just a boy in the first book. He is much older in the second book, where he is anointed by the consuming fire and chosen as the replacement captain to Saris.
- Rob: A clumsy kid, the only student Sam ever lost.
- Samryee: Hunter's teacher, a codebearer captain from the shard of Sinos.
- Saris: A narcoleptic codebearer from the shard of Torpor, succeeded by Philan.
- Sceleris: Sumpreme lord of the Shadow and all other evil forces. He usually appears in the form of a snake, and he tries to kill Hunter at the end of book one, only to kill Aviad instead. In book two, the codebearers oust Sceleris from his stronghold on the shard of Dolor. An allegory of Satan.
- Stone-Eyed Sterling: Nicknamed "Stoney". He provided transportation for Hunter, Rob, and Trista in book two, until he betrayed them at the Battle of Torpor. He later repented and was marked by the consuming fire.
- Stretch: One of Hunter's best friends from school. He accompanies Hunter on his first journey into Solandria, but is tricked by Venator into going back to the veil, where he forgets all about his adventure.
- Stubbs: Another one of Hunter's best friends from school.
- Tonomis: An evil spirit called a Watcher, Tonomis joins the Shadow in Eye of Ends. After taking control of Caleb's body, Tonomis transforms the two of them into a monstrous titan. When Hunter defeats the titan, Tonomis is destroyed and Caleb is redeemed. Tonomis sometimes took the form of a human, under the name of "Simon Ot".
- Trista: Emily's friend who also becomes Hunter's friend in book two and, eventually, his girlfriend in book three.
- Tyra: A codebearer captain from the shard of Sophmalan, the only woman captain.
- Venator: Hunter's evil clone, Sceleris' right-hand man. Venator is the main villain in The Secret of the Shadow. He is constantly haunting Hunter's dreams, and he is a powerful sorcerer. At the end, Hunter breaks into Venator's stronghold and leads the codebearers against the Shadow there. He then seizes the Bloodstone from Venator, the source of Venator's power, but Venator manages to escape. He is a secondary antagonist in The Consuming Fire, where he disguises as a psychiatrist and tries to trick Hunter into believing Solandria is something in his imagination. At the beginning of Eye of Ends, Venator is consumed by the watcher Tonomis, though it is unknown whether he actually died or not.
- Vogler: A good watcher, he takes on the form of a black man in Eye of Ends. Hunter suspects him to be evil until Vogler saves his life near the end.
- Xaul: The primary antagonist in The Consuming Fire. He is a Xin warrior who wants to kill all codebearers, and he stalks Hunter in pursuit of the consuming fire, which he manages to steal at the end of the book. However, the fire turns on him and destroys him. In Eye of Ends Xaul was brought back to life and renamed Xias. He then joined the Resistance. An allegory of Saul of Tarsus.
- Zeeb: A peg-legged goblin who serves as Venator's chief aide. He returns in The Consuming Fire, where he may have died. His backstory is given at the beginning of Eye of Ends.

== Codebearers' Website ==
The Miller Brothers created a website called Codebearers.com which includes videos, forums, and e-books. It also contains a series of challenges where the player can go to Solandria and share Hunter Brown's adventures. The Codebearer Challenges tie the first and second books together with a story where Hunter receives a message from someone he met in Solandria. The player has to solve the challenges to be allowed to read the message. The Codebearer Challenges are not an action, but more like Myst, where one must use logic, along with some help from the Hunter Brown books, to solve puzzles. So far, only four challenges are online and ready to be played.

Shortly before Eye of Ends was released, the Miller Brothers created a new website with new forums. The challenges have not yet been added onto the new site.
