= Thomas Dinham Atkinson =

British architect and historian (1864–1948)

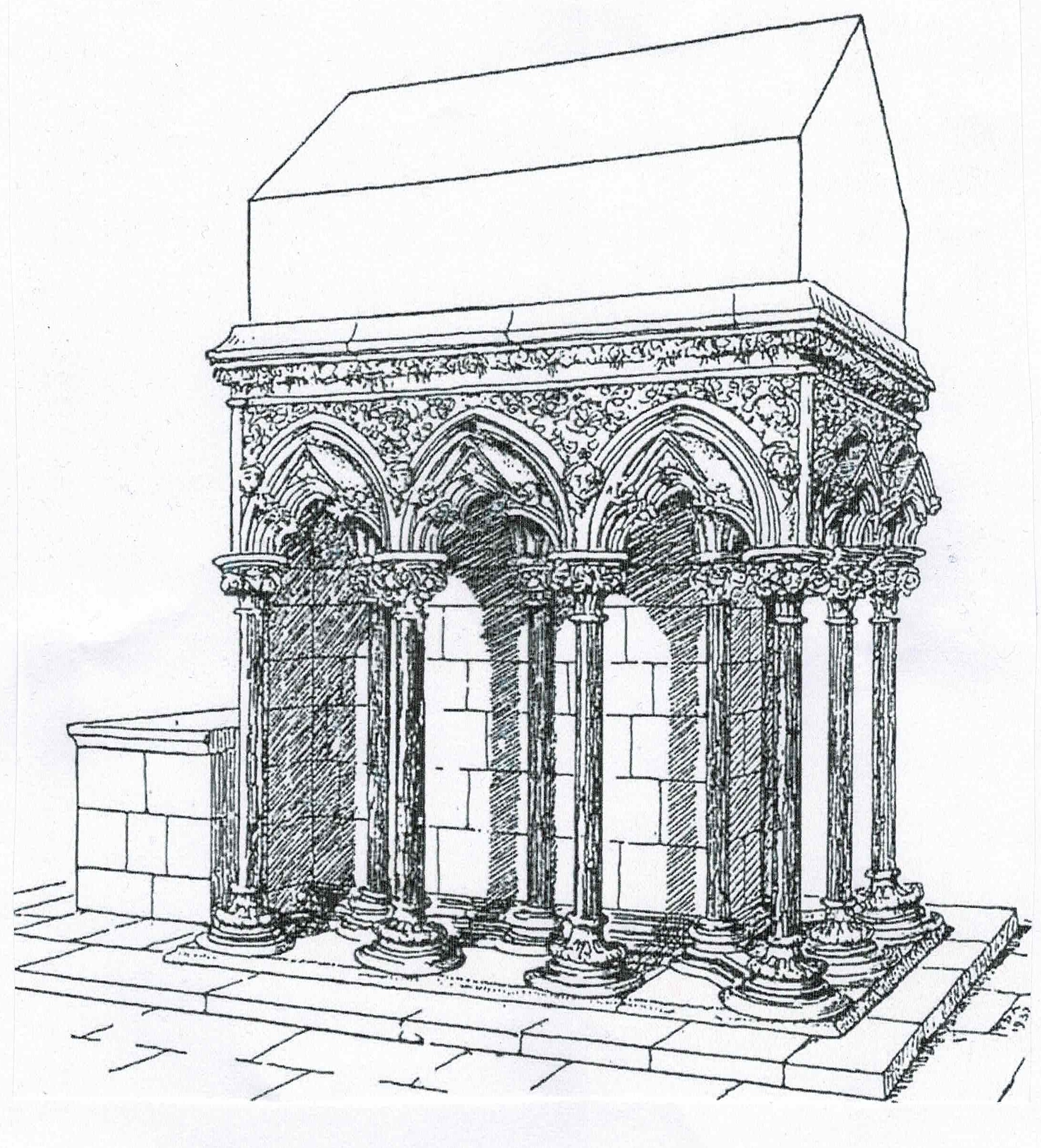
Atkinson's reconstruction of Shrine to St Etheldreda

Thomas Dinham Atkinson (9 April 1864 in Sheffield – 29 December 1948 in Winchester) was an English architect who gained prominence as an antiquarian specialising in ecclesiastical architecture.

== Biography ==
Thomas was born the son of a clergy man in Sheffield and attended Rossall School, Lancashire. After attending University College, London he was articled to Arthur William Blomfield in January 1882, qualifying as an architect in 1889 and was elected as an associate of the Royal Institute of British Architects that year. During his apprenticeship Atkinson had worked as an assistant to Blomfield, who had been clerk of works on several church restoration projects. After attending the British School at Athens, Atkinson established a practice in Cambridge with C.W. Long.

He was appointed Surveyor to the Dean and Chapter of Ely Cathedral in 1906, a post he held until 1920: He had accepted the post of Architectural Surveyor to the Dean and Chapter of Winchester Cathedral in 1919, and relinquished the Ely post when it became clear he could not fulfil both roles.

In 1907 he married Annie Gertrude Chataway (1866–1951).
