= Gertrude Chataway =

Child friend of Lewis Carroll

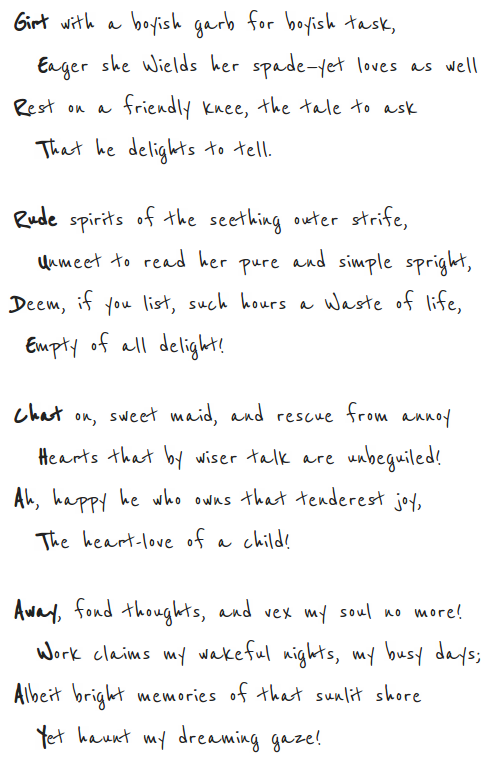
Lewis Carroll wrote this unique double acrostic for Gertrude Chataway. The verses embody her name in two ways — by letters, and by syllables. This is the only double acrostic of its kind.

Annie Gertrude Chataway (1866–1951, married name Atkinson) is known for her association with the author Lewis Carroll (Charles Lutwidge Dodgson). His The Hunting of the Snark is dedicated to her, and opens with a poem that uses her name as a double acrostic.

== Relationship with Dodgson ==
Gertrude was the most important child-friend in the life of the author Lewis Carroll, after Alice Liddell.

Carroll first became friends with Gertrude in 1875, when she was aged nine and he was forty-three, while on holiday at the English seaside resort of Sandown. He made a number of pen and ink sketches of Gertrude as a young girl. He continued to correspond with her, and to spend numerous seaside holidays with her, including several when she was in her late twenties.

It was Gertrude who inspired Carroll's great nonsense mock-epic The Hunting of the Snark (1876): the book is dedicated to her, and opens with a poem that uses her name as a double acrostic.

== Family ==
Gertrude was the daughter of James Chataway (1827–1907) and his wife Elizabeth (1833–1893, née Drinkwater), one of fifteen children. Her brothers included James and Thomas Chataway.

In 1907 she married the architect Thomas Dinham Atkinson (1864–1948).
