= Cardiknox =

American indie pop band

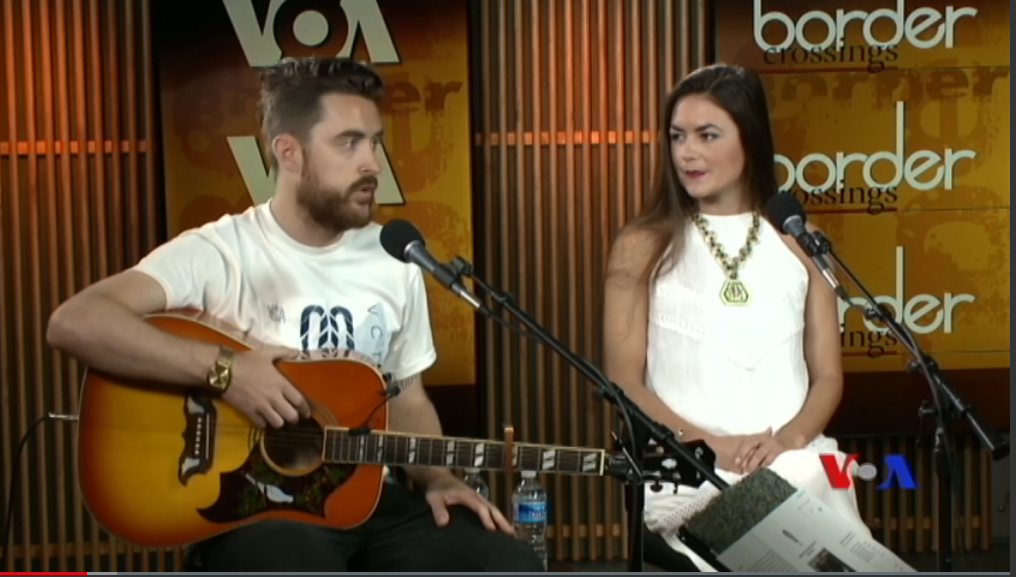
- Cardiknox on the Voice of America, August 2016.

Background information
- Origin: Seattle, United States
- Genres: Pop; indie pop; dance
- Years active: 2013–2018
- Label: Warner Bros.
- Members: Lonnie Angle; Thomas Dutton

Cardiknox was an American indie pop band. Formed in 2013, the duo consisted of Lonnie Angle (vocals) and Thomas Dutton (backup vocals and keyboard). The group's singles were reviewed by magazines and newspapers including Billboard, MTV, The A.V. Club, and The Guardian. Cardiknox signed with Warner Bros. Records in 2015 and released their debut album Portrait in March 2016; they also reached number 13 on the Billboard Spotify Viral 50 chart with the song "Wild Child".

== History ==
Both Lonnie Angle and Thomas Dutton grew up in the suburbs of Seattle. They were introduced through a mutual friend. Angle was a theater major and singer, while Dutton was a musician and the lead singer of Forgive Durden. Dutton had written a concept album called Razia's Shadow, and the duo started working together to adapt it into an off-Broadway theater production with The Public Theater. The musical was a success, but the duo made the decision to leave it behind and form a band in 2013. The band name is a play on Dutton's mother's maiden name of Cardinaux.

Two of the band's singles made the Hype Machine Top 10 in 2013. "Technicolor Dreaming" became an "under-the-radar" hit, with its video premiering on The A.V. Club. With "Technicolor Dreaming", the band moved in the direction of synth and 1980s sound.

Throughout 2015, Cardiknox played at big festivals in the United States, Canada, and Europe, including Lollapalooza, Firefly, Sasquatch, Reading, Leeds, and Pukkelpop. The band signed with Warner Bros. Records. In November, Cardiknox released "On My Way", a "dance-y pop banger". Its video, a mash-up of vintage fashion runway footage, was premiered by Vogue.

Before releasing their debut album, Cardiknox published four singles from the album: "Doors", "On My Way", "Wild Child", and "Into the Night". "Wild Child" reached number 13 on the Spotify Viral 50 chart. After six months spent at Henson Recording Studios in Hollywood, the album Portrait was released on March 11, 2016. It was produced by Grammy-winning producer John Shanks and the cover was designed by street artist Tristan Eaton.

The band went on tour in early 2016, first touring with The Knocks and then joining Carly Rae Jepsen on her Gimmie Love Tour. They also toured with Bleachers.

On December 7, 2018, the band released "Back in L.A." and announced on social media that it was the end of their work together. The band's website, cardiknox.com, ceased to exist during the summer of 2019.

== Musical style ==
The music of Cardiknox has been described as dance-pop. The duo cites Peter Gabriel, Cyndi Lauper, Madonna, and Drake as influences. Vogue commented that they "give the impression of having one foot in the indie world and one in the pop world. But they are leaning pop." Angle herself described their sound as "indie, electronic, epic, cinematic, nostalgic, and even a little eighties-inspired."

Portrait mixed 1980s beats with modern pop elements. The album has been described as "edgy and innovative", with "inventive and experimental" tracks. The songs' subject matters include relationship breakup ("Souvenirs"), youthful rebellion ("Wild Child"), rejection ("Doors"), and family breakup ("Shadowboxing").

Reviewing the appearance of Cardiknox at CMJ Music Marathon, The Guardian described their sound as "glittering, skittering electro-pop (...) with songs in the vein of bands like Chvrches and The Naked and Famous." Commenting their single Wasted Youth, MTV said Angle sounded "like a mix between Icona Pop and Sky Ferreira with an electro-pop/dub jones."

The duo has very different musical backgrounds: Angle had classical piano training, while Dutton's first musical education was punk rock.

== Discography ==
=== Albums ===
Title	Details
Portrait	Released: March 11, 2016; Label: Warner Bros.; Format: Digital download

=== Singles ===
Title	Year	Peak chart positions	Album
Title	Year	Billboard Spotify 50	Album
"Hold Me Down"	2013	—	Non-album single
"Technicolor Dreaming"	2013	—	Non-album single
"Wasted Youth"	2014	—	Non-album single
"Doors"	2015	—	Portrait
"On My Way"	2015	—	Portrait
"Into the Night"	2016	—	Portrait
"Wild Child"	2016	13	Portrait
"—" denotes a single that did not chart or was not released in that territory.

=== Music videos ===
Title	Year	Director
"Hold Me Down"	2013	David Kalani & Thomas Dutton
"Technicolor Dreaming"	2013	Thomas Dutton
"On My Way"	2016	Edgar Obrand
