= Razia Sultana (disambiguation) =

Razia Sultan (1205–1240) was a ruler of the Delhi Sultanate and the first female ruler of India.

Razia Sultana, Razia Sultan, or Raziya Sultan may also refer to:

- Razia Sultana (lawyer) (born 1973), Bangladeshi lawyer
- Razia Sultana (politician) (born 1966), Indian politician
- Sultana Razia (politician), Bangladeshi politician
- Razia Sultan (film), a 1983 Indian Hindi-language film about the ruler
- Razia Sultan (TV series), a 2015 Indian TV series about the ruler

== See also ==
- Razia (disambiguation)
- Sultana (disambiguation)
