= Razia Barakzai =

Afghan women's rights activist

- Pashto: راضیه بارکزۍ
- Born: 1995 (age 30–31); Farah Province, Afghanistan
- Education: Herat University; Kabul University

Razia Barakzai (Pashto: راضیه بارکزۍ; born 1995) is an Afghan women's rights activist. She was named one of the BBC's 100 Women in 2021 for leading the first women's protests against the Taliban in August 2021, following their takeover of Afghanistan earlier that month.

== Early life and education ==
Barakzai was born in Farah Province. She was the only child born to her Pashtun parents; her mother was a housewife, while her father was a commander in the Afghan Security Forces. She attended Herat University, where she studied political science, and obtained her master's degree from Kabul University.

== Career ==
In the late 2010s, Barakzai was the sole provider for her family. She worked both as a university professor in Kabul and for the Independent Election Commission of Afghanistan at the presidential palace. During her time with the commission, five of her suggested projects were approved, including proposals for peace parks in the Herat and Nangarhar Provinces and the creation of online systems with which users could submit complaints and petitions to the government. Her last day working at the presidential palace was August 15, 2021, when all workers were asked to leave for their own safety; the Taliban took over the building later that day.

== Activism ==
On August 16, 2021, following the Taliban takeover of Afghanistan, Barakzai and two other women led the first women's protests against the new government in Zanbaq Square, near the presidential palace. In the aftermath, she was arrested and beaten. Online, Barakzai started the hashtag #AfghanWomenExist under which to organize in-person demonstrations. She continued to participate in protests in September 2021, in response to statements suggesting women would not be able to hold positions in the new government. During these protests, she reported being struck in the head by Taliban forces, and that tear gas and pepper spray were used against protesters.

Barakzai and other online organizers declared October 10, 2021 as World Women Solidarity Day With Afghan Women. In December 2021, Barakzai participated in protests surrounding women's rights to work and study, and the need for financial relief.

By late 2021, Barakzai had fled Afghanistan due to death threats made against her by the Taliban. She first traveled to Mashdad, Iran, but relocated after realizing she was still being surveilled. She continued to change locations as she continued to receive death threats.

In early November 2022, Barakzai helped organize a letter-writing campaign aimed at the United Nations Security Council, urging the body to take action to help Afghan women. She has criticized UN Deputy Secretary-General Amina Mohammed and U.S. Special Envoy for Afghan Women, Girls, and Human Rights Rina Amiri for meeting with Taliban officials or suggesting the Taliban might be validated as Afghanistan's legitimate government.

As of July 2023, Barakzai was living in Pakistan with relatives. She maintained contact with activists in Afghanistan, and continued to speak out against Taliban policies, such as the shutdown of women's salons.
