= Razia's Shadow: A Musical =

Studio album by Forgive Durden
- Released: October 28, 2008
- Recorded: October 2007 – July 2008
- Genre: Alternative rock; musical; emo pop
- Length: 64:03
- Label: Fueled by Ramen
- Producer: Casey Bates; Kay Richardson; Patton Thomas

Forgive Durden chronology
Wonderland (2006)	Razia's Shadow: A Musical (2008)

Professional ratings
Review scores
Source	Rating
AbsolutePunk	86%
Highbeam Review	9/10

Razia's Shadow: A Musical is an album by American band Forgive Durden, released through Fueled by Ramen on October 28, 2008. It is a musical featuring members of popular bands such as Saves the Day, Panic! at the Disco, Say Anything, The Matches, mewithoutYou, Portugal. The Man, The Hush Sound, An Angle, The Dear Hunter, and Gatsbys American Dream among others.

The album was conceived by Thomas Dutton and co-written by his brother Paul Dutton. The album also features Rudy Gajadhar of Gatsbys American Dream on drums.

The full album was released for streaming on the band's website on October 24, 2008, and was subsequently leaked via torrents that same day.

On November 29, 2012, a new version of the musical was debuted as a live performance at Joe's Pub, with significant changes to the characters, songs, and storyline featured on the original album. Two new characters named Rivka and the Mysterious Man were introduced while all of the original characters were removed except Adakias, Nidria, The Oracle, and the King.

== Production ==
Writing for the album started in approximately January 2006, with Thomas Dutton writing and recording the first demo with then-guitarist Thomas Hunter. Dutton had originally envisioned the album as a side-project, without the involvement of drummer Andy Mannino and bassist Jesse Bauer. In the months that followed, Hunter, Mannino, and Bauer all quit the band due to personality conflicts, leaving Dutton as the sole member.

At this point, Dutton decided the album would be released under the Forgive Durden moniker and enlisted the help of his brother Paul, a music composition major who was still in school at the time. The brothers would collaborate on weekends while Paul was still in school, with Thomas writing and demoing their ideas during the week. Thomas drew much influence from musical films such as Moulin Rouge!, Newsies, and many of Disney's animated musical films such as Aladdin.

Recording began in October 2007 with Rudy Gajadhar recording drums. Due to budget limitations, Thomas elected to primarily use software for the orchestral parts rather than hiring musicians. More than half of the guest vocalists were recorded in person, while the remainder of the vocalists were sent electronic files with Thomas singing their parts. The vocalists then recorded their parts and returned them electronically.

Recording was finished in July 2008. The album artwork was created by Blaine Fontana. In addition to the standard version, a limited deluxe edition of the album was also available; including the album in a DVD-sized case with a copy of the full script and artwork.

== Story ==
In an interview with Alternative Press, Thomas declined to go into great detail about the album's story, stating only that the story is split into two halves: "The first half is the creation and ultimate division of the world. The second half is the story of destined love and the world being reunited as one." The Fueled by Ramen product page describes the album as follows:

The album tells the story of a world divided in two by the selfish actions of a powerful and egotistical, yet insecure angel. After generations of darkness, the world is eventually brought back together by the love and sacrifice of a couple brave enough to fulfill their destinies.

=== Characters ===
The official Razia's Shadow website lists the characters with accompanying pictures. A new character was added to the site every weekday starting in mid-September until September 29, 2008. The characters are as follows:

- O the Scientist – Casey Crescenzo (The Dear Hunter)
- Bawaba Brothers – John Baldwin Gourley (Portugal. The Man), Kris Anaya (An Angle)
- Narrator – Aaron Weiss (mewithoutYou)
- Gargul the Oracle – Danny Stevens (The Audition)
- Toba the Tura – Chris Conley (Saves the Day)
- Sangara – Dan Young (This Providence)
- Barayas the Spider – Max Bemis (Say Anything)
- Princess Anhura – Greta Salpeter (The Hush Sound)
- Pallis – Brendon Urie (Panic! at the Disco)
- King Malka – Nic Newsham (Gatsbys American Dream)
- Doctor Dumaya – Shawn Harris (The Matches)
- Nidria – Lizzie Huffman (Man in the Blue Van)
- Adakias – Thomas Dutton (Forgive Durden)
- Ahrima – Thomas Dutton (Forgive Durden)

=== Story by song ===
"Genesis" (featuring Casey Crescenzo)

O the Scientist creates the world in which He will live with His angels. The Narrator explains that His two purest cherubs are Ahrima and Nidria, who both believe in love and hope. The Narrator explains that Ahrima is very frustrated at the thought that his skills are being misused and ignored, but Nidria is there to calm his frustration.

"The Missing Piece" (featuring Lizzie Huffman)

Although still frustrated that O the Scientist does not appreciate his unique skills, Ahrima confesses his love to Nidria, who tells him she has fallen in love with him too. She alone can soothe Ahrima's ire at O's failure to notice him. Nonetheless, Ahrima goes to O the Scientist to complain about not being able to show his gift. O dismisses him with a few words.

"Life Is Looking Up"

Ahrima dreams of the day O and the other angels will realize how he can change the world and all the compliments they will give him. He creates the Lamps, both to show his skill and as a monument of his love to Nidria. The people of the world adore the lamps, but not in the way he had hoped. Ahrima goes to O to see his response but only replies in a smile. Discouraged and angry, Ahrima retreats to the darkness.

"The Spider and the Lamps" (featuring Max Bemis)

Barayas the Spider lands on Ahrima's shoulder in the darkness and, through flattery and trickery, gets Ahrima to destroy the lamps and bring them to him. Ahrima's rage and destruction terrify the gathered crowd, and Toba the Tura is sent to hold Ahrima responsible.

"Toba the Tura" (featuring Chris Conley)

Toba the Tura opens Ahrima's eyes and shows him the ashes of what was the world he helped to create. Ahrima apologizes, but Toba the Tura all the same banishes Ahrima to live in the ashes while the rest of the angels travel to a better place. Ahrima calls out, "Oh, what have I done, please make me your son!" while Toba sings of Ahrima's betrayal. Ahrima's family builds a wall to separate themselves from him and the darkness he has created.

"The Oracle" (featuring Danny Stevens)

The Oracle and the angels tell Ahrima about a prophecy that says one day will come two people whose love (and one's sacrifice) will be so strong to reunite the Dark and the Light as one.

"A Hundred Year, Minute-Long Intermission" (featuring Danny Stevens)

100 years pass between The Dark and The Light.

"The Exit" (featuring Brendon Urie of Panic! at the Disco, Dan Young of This Providence)

Adakias is prince of the Dark, along with his elder brother Pallis (Brendon Urie). Despite his life of privilege, he longs for a world and life like in the stories he has heard. Sangara, his butler, and the townsfolk ostracize him and insist he be more like Pallis. He, however, feels that his destiny might be outside his kingdom and may in turn fulfill the prophecy, which is now disregarded as fiction. Tired of his brother's attitude, Pallis says that, if Adakias leaves, he will hunt him down and make him suffer the consequences. While Adakias tries to convince him that his feelings could be tied to his destiny, Pallis asserts that it will lead him to destruction. Adakias leaves, despite his brother's objections. The Narrator then tells of Adakias in the city of Light, where disguised as a citizen he sees Princess Anhura (Greta Salpeter), who is Adakias' spiritual twin: just as sad and dissatisfied with her world.

"It's True Love" (featuring Greta Salpeter)

Adakias and Princess Anhura confess their love for each other, sharing their feeling of being destined for something bigger. Adakias does not tell Princess Anhura that he comes from the Dark, afraid that this might scare her and make her run away from him. Deciding to marry, Adakias and Princess Anhura go to her father, so that Adakias can ask him for his daughter's hand.

"Meet the King" (featuring Greta Salpeter and Nic Newsham)

Even though Adakias tells the King he loves Princess Anhura and is not interested in his throne or jewels, King Malka forbids the marriage, afraid Adakias might rob him. In addition, King Malka senses a darkness in Adakias. Denied approval, Adakias and Princess Anhura decide to marry in secret, but suddenly Anhura starts to feel nauseous and weak. Adakias knows why she is ill: it is his presence, the Dark in him affecting Anhura's body. Still keeping his true self secret, he seeks out a specialist on the other side of the levee.

"Holy the Sea" (featuring John Gourley and Kris Ayana)

Adakias and Anhura encounter the Bawaba Brothers, who can see that Adakias is descended from a boy who destroyed part of the world, splitting the world into the Light and the Dark. Adakias understands this is the prophecy he has heard about and is now sure he is the one who will fulfill it. The Bawaba Brothers tell them to beware of people who are beloved but, really are wicked. Adakias and Anhura leave the Bawaba Brothers and finally meet with Doctor Dumaya, who, although cordial, arouses an unidentifiable suspicion in the lovers.

"Doctor Doctor" (featuring Shawn Harris)

Doctor Dumaya concludes that Anhura's illness will kill her if a cure is not found. The Doctor, however, admits that he can heal Anhura, but only if he can keep her forever for his pleasure. Anhura refuses, but Adakias convinces her that it is the only way she can be cured. Doctor Dumaya then administers a potion that heals her. Suddenly, Pallis, having tracked Adakias' every movement, bursts through the door and challenges Adakias to prove his love for the Princess.

"The End and the Beginning" (featuring Greta Salpeter and Brendon Urie)

Resolved to force Adakias back to his old life, Pallis reveals to the Princess that Adakias is from the Dark. Adakias explains to Anhura that he wanted to tell her and that this new information should not change their love. Pallis, furious that the revelation has not affected their love, lunges at Anhura with a dagger. Adakias, however, trying to protect the Princess, is stabbed. Pallis immediately regrets his actions and repents for not seeing his brother as the chosen one to fulfill the prophecy. Adakias, before dying, forgives him and tells Pallis and Anhura that his gift to them is to "Live for your love everyday." The story complete, the Narrator tells how the mountain disappears and the two halves of the world finally reunite, implying that Pallis and Anhura mutually combined the kingdoms in Adakias' honor. He ends his narration telling who is listening to pass on the story to other people and to never stop believing in love and hope.

== Track listing ==
All tracks are written by Thomas Dutton and Paul Dutton.

Razia's Shadow: A Musical track listing
No.	Title	Featuring	Length
1.	"Genesis"	Casey Crescenzo	4:19
2.	"The Missing Piece"	Lizzie Huffman	4:46
3.	"Life Is Looking Up"	Thomas Patton III (as Patton Thomas; producer)	5:21
4.	"The Spider and the Lamps"	Max Bemis	5:11
5.	"Toba the Tura"	Chris Conley	4:25
6.	"The Oracle"	Danny Stevens	5:23
7.	"A Hundred Year, Minute-Long Intermission"	Danny Stevens	1:02
8.	"The Exit"	Brendon Urie, Dan Young	5:39
9.	"It's True Love"	Greta Salpeter	5:38
10.	"Meet the King"	Greta Salpeter, Nic Newsham	5:24
11.	"Holy the Sea"	John Gourley, Kris Ayana	6:05
12.	"Doctor Doctor"	Shawn Harris	4:57
13.	"The End and the Beginning"	Greta Salpeter, Brendon Urie	5:53

iTunes bonus tracks
No.	Title	Length
14.	"Genesis" (acoustic demo)	3:29
15.	"Toba the Tura" (acoustic demo)	3:23
16.	"Meet the King" (acoustic demo)	3:40
17.	"Genesis" (alternate ending)	1:07

== Personnel ==
- Thomas Dutton – vocals, guitar, percussion, trumpet
- Paul Dutton – orchestration, guitar, piano, bass, drums/percussion
- Rudy Gajadhar – drums
- Thomas Patton III (as Patton Thomas) - producer
- Casey Bates – producer

== Adaptations ==
In 2019, a collective of artists based in South Minneapolis staged a production of Razia’s Shadow featuring original puppets constructed by the ensemble. The production originated from puppeteer Marc Berg’s senior thesis project, which was based on the album. The group later became known as Phantom Chorus Theatre in Minneapolis and mounted a subsequent production of Razia’s Shadow in 2026, featuring newly designed puppets and performed at the Hive Collaborative.
