= Wonderland (Forgive Durden album) =

Studio album by Forgive Durden
- Released: May 9, 2006
- Genre: Emo, pop punk
- Length: 39:45
- Label: Fueled by Ramen
- Producer: Casey Bates

Forgive Durden chronology
When You're Alone, You're Not Alone (2004)	Wonderland (2006)	Razia's Shadow: A Musical (2008)

Professional ratings
Review scores
Source	Rating
AbsolutePunk.net	(90%)
Punknews.org	3.5/5 stars

Wonderland is the debut studio album from the indie rock band Forgive Durden. It was released by Fueled by Ramen on May 9, 2006. The album (or a majority of the songs on it) makes references to the works of Lewis Carroll, including Alice's Adventures In Wonderland, and Jabberwocky as well as works by others such as The Wizard of Oz by L. Frank Baum and Newsies by Kenny Ortega.

The album spawned two singles, "Beware the Jubjub Bird and Shun the Frumious Bandersnatch" released in 2006 and "Ants" in 2007.

== Track listing ==
1. "Ants" – 3:20
2. "Beware the Jubjub Bird and Shun the Fumious Bandersnatch" – 4:05
3. "Ear to Ear" – 3:02
4. "Parable of the Sower" – 4:23
5. "Il Tango Della Signora Francesco di Bartolommeo di Zanobi del Giocono" – 3:29
6. "A Dead Person Breathed on Me!" – 1:34
7. "The Great Affair Is to Move" – 4:02
8. "Harry Frazee and No, No, Nannette" – 3:41
9. "For a Dreamer, Night's the Only Time of Day" – 4:09
10. "I've Got a Witch Mad at Me and You Could Get into Trouble" – 4:19
11. "Cue the Sun" – 3:41
