= Razzia =

Razzia (Italian and other languages, 'raid') may refer to:

== Raids ==
- Ghazw, military expeditions as described in early Islamic literature
- Razzia (military), surprise attacks against an enemy settlement
- a slave raid conducted by Barbary pirates
- a Police raid
- a Nazi roundup in World War II
  - Raid of the Ghetto of Rome, 1943

== Arts and entertainment ==
- Raid (1947 film) (German: Razzia), a German crime film
- Razzia (band), a German punk band
- Razzia sur la chnouf, released in the US as Razzia, a 1955 French gangster film
- Razzia (2017 film), a Moroccan drama film
- Razzia Records, a Swedish record label
- Razzia (artist) (Gérard Courbouleix–Dénériaz, born 1950), a French poster artist
- "Razzia" (song), a 1982 song by Rainhard Fendrich
- Razzia!, a mafia-themed release of the board game Ra

== See also ==
- Razia (disambiguation)
- Ghazi (disambiguation)
- Raid (military)
