= Razia Sirajuddin =

Pakistani painter (1902–1969)

- Sirajuddin, from a 1945 issue of The Indian Listener
- Born: Razia Begum; 1902; Madras, Madras Presidency, British Raj, British India
- Died: 13 May 1969 (aged 66–67); Murree, Pakistan
- Resting place: Lahore
- Other name: Emily Brontë of Pakistan
- Education: Queen Mary College, Lahore
- Alma mater: University of Oxford
- Occupations: Painter; Radio Artist; Musician
- Years active: 1918 – 1969
- Spouse: Sirajuddin Ahmed (husband)
- Children: 1

Razia Sirajuddin (Urdu: رضیہ سراج الدین; 1902 – 13 May 1969) was an artist who was active in the art and cultural scenes of pre-partition India and early Pakistan. She was called the Emily Brontë of Pakistan due to her introspective depth, distinctive presence in Lahore's art scene, and the passionate nature of her work. She was known for her intellectual pursuits and a unique style that sought to remain Eastern while incorporating modern techniques.

== Early life ==
Razia Sirajuddin studied at Sacred Heart School and later at Queen Mary College in Lahore. She pursued higher education in art and academics in the United Kingdom, studying at the Royal Academy of Arts in London under Sir William Rothenstein. She spent a significant period studying at Oxford University.

== Career ==
=== Artistic style ===
After returning to the subcontinent, Sirajuddin joined Lahore's artistic and intellectual circles. She painted in oils and watercolours, while rejecting Western styles such as Cubism and Surrealism. Contemporaries, including M.A. Rahman Chughtai, described her work as “seared with heartfelt emotion". Her painting Black Burqa drew strong praise from Western critics at an Oxford exhibition covered by the BBC. She created a portrait of Abdullah Yusuf Ali.

=== Literary and cultural contributions ===
Sirajuddin gave radio talks on Radio Station Lahore and acted in dramas. At Patras Bokhari’s suggestion, she wrote the introduction and notes for Chughtai's landmark book Chughtai’s Paintings (1939). Her text added critical depth and boosted her standing in local art circles. In 1946 she helped plan a cultural body for the new nation of Pakistan. The group founded the country's first Arts Council in 1949, later renamed Alhamra Arts Council. She corresponded regularly with Chughtai from 1949 to 1955 and prepared a new foreword for a planned second edition of his book that never appeared.

== Personal life ==
Razia Sirajuddin married Professor Sirajuddin Ahmed of Government College, Lahore. She was known for her charismatic personality and ethereal appearance, often decorating her attire and hair with flowers. They had one son named Imdad Sirajuddin, who became a violinist.

The marriage faced difficulties when Professor Sirajuddin became involved with one of his students, Urmila Sondhi (who later converted to Islam and became Umrao Begum). Razia took her son Imdad to Oxford with her during this period.

Razia Sirajuddin died in 1969 in a road accident near Murree, a hill station in Pakistan.

== Legacy ==
The Chughtai Museum has worked to preserve her memory and published articles about her life and work.
