= Forgive Durden =

American indie rock band

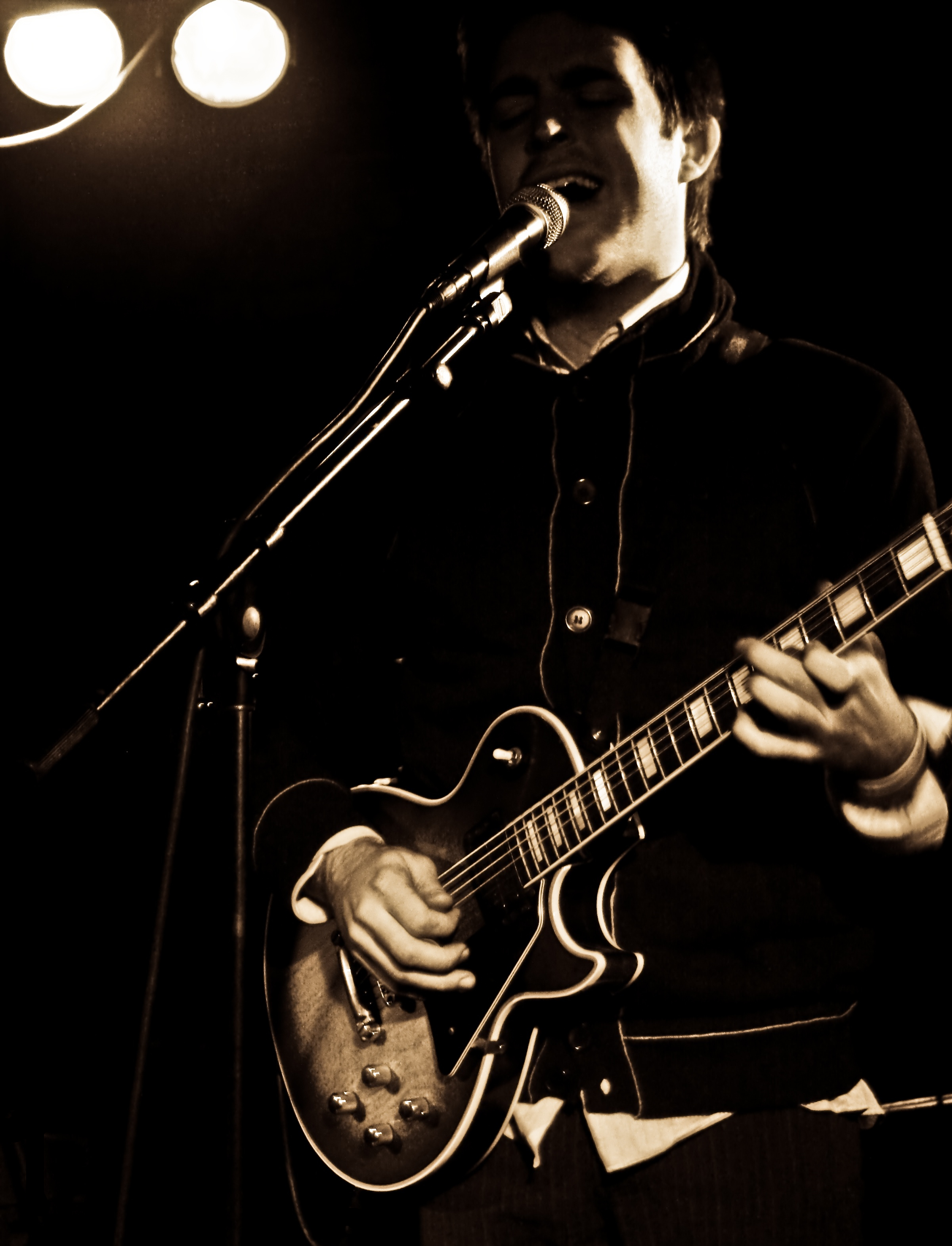
- Thomas Dutton of Forgive Durden, live in 2008

Background information
- Origin: Seattle, Washington, United States
- Genres: Indie rock; post-hardcore; emo (early)
- Years active: 2003–2010; 2012
- Label: Fueled by Ramen
- Members: Thomas Dutton
- Past members: Thomas Hunter; Andy Mannino; Jesse Bauer; Jaron Johnson; Zack Olson; Andrew Jakober; Thomas Patton III; David Kalani Larkins; Patrick Haskin
- Website: Official website

Forgive Durden was an American indie rock band from Seattle, Washington, United States. They got their name from the fictional character Tyler Durden from the novel Fight Club. They were signed to Fueled by Ramen. Fueled by Ramen released Forgive Durden's first full-length album, Wonderland, on May 9, 2006.

On January 27, 2008, lead singer Thomas Dutton announced on the band's blog that the other three members had decided to leave the band, citing personality conflicts as the primary reason. He also announced that his brother Paul had been helping him write and record a new album, Razia's Shadow: A Musical with the help of Gatsbys American Dream's Rudy Gajadhar playing drums, and Aaron Weiss from mewithoutYou as the narrator. It was not mentioned whether the other two had become full-time members of the band. Dutton recruited numerous members to perform live including Fred Mascherino, Dave Melillo, and Casey Crescenzo. In 2008, David Kalani Larkins, Zack Olson, Andrew J. Jakober and Jaron Johnson joined the band to handle touring duties and to support Razia's Shadow on the road.

On August 4, 2010, Forgive Durden announced that they would be playing a special, one-night-only performance of their debut album Wonderland at El Corazon in Seattle on September 10, 2010. It was also said to be the band's final hometown show. The show was sold out. Places & Numbers and Princess Dinosaur were also a part of the show as was local Seattle band, Lovely Lovers.

On June 12, 2012, in an interview about his work as a film producer, Larkins was quoted that he and Dutton were working on a new music project.

Dutton later formed another band, Cardiknox, in which he performed backing vocals and keyboards. They disbanded in 2019. Dutton now has his own project, Only Twin.

== Band members ==
=== Current ===
- Thomas Dutton – vocals, guitar

=== Former ===
- Thomas Hunter – guitar, backing vocals (2003–2008)
- Andy Mannino – drums (2003–2008)
- Jesse Bauer – bass (2003–2008)
- David Kalani Larkins – bass/backup vocals (2008–2010)
- Jaron Johnson – drums (2008-2010)
- Thomas Patton III - lead guitar/backup vocals (2009-2010)
- Zack Olson – keyboards/backup vocals (2008–2010)
- Andrew Jakober – guitar/backup vocals (2008–2010)

== Discography ==
- Bandages & Royalty EP (2003)
- When You're Alone, You're Not Alone EP (August 23, 2004)
- Wonderland (May 9, 2006)
- Razia's Shadow: A Musical (October 28, 2008)

== Music videos ==
- The first music video released by the band is "Beware the Jubjub Bird and Shun the Frumious Bandersnatch", from Wonderland, in 2006. The video was shot by band member David Kalani Larkins.
- Forgive Durden's second music video for "Ants" has been released via Absolutepunk.net.
- Their third music video for "Life Is Looking Up" was premiered on MySpace on November 13, 2008. The video was shot and directed by band member David Kalani Larkins.

All videos are available for viewing on the official Fueled by Ramen YouTube channel.

== Tours ==
- In 2006, Forgive Durden supported Panic! at the Disco, along with Men, Women & Children as they toured the United Kingdom.
- Forgive Durden toured the United States with The Almost and Classic Case in January 2007.
- The band was part of the second announcement for the Soundwave festival in Brisbane, Sydney and Perth, Australia in February/March 2007. Some of the other acts on the bill included Deftones, +44, Thrice and Suicidal Tendencies.
- Forgive Durden toured the United States with Steel Train and Dear and the Headlights in the fall of 2008.
- Forgive Durden went on a headlining tour, Razia's Shadow: The Tour, with You, Me, and Everyone We Know and Anarbor in Spring/Summer 2009.
- In 2012, Thomas Dutton announced a show at Joe's Pub in New York City on November 28, where he and guest performers would perform the new version of Razia's Shadow. The first show sold out, and a second one was added for November 29.
