= List of songs recorded by Saves the Day =

The following is a sortable table of all songs by Saves the Day:

- The column Song list the song title.
- The column Writer(s) lists who wrote the song.
- The column Album lists the album the song is featured on.
- The column Producer lists the producer of the song.
- The column Year lists the year in which the song was released.
- The column Length list the length/duration of the song.

== Studio recordings ==
Song	Writer(s)	Album	Producer	Year	Length
"1984"	Chris Conley, Saves the Day	Daybreak	Marc Hudson, Saves the Day	2011	3:07
"1984" (acoustic)	Chris Conley, Saves the Day	Daybreak Acoustic	—	2011	3:05
"1:19"^{[B]}	—	Saves the Day (EP)	—	1997	1:38
"34"	Chris Conley, Saves the Day	Sound the Alarm	Steve Evetts	2006	2:22
"A Drag in D Flat"^{[B]}	Chris Conley, Saves the Day	Another Year on the Streets	—	2000	2:38
"A Drag in D Flat" (acoustic)	Chris Conley, Saves the Day	Bug Sessions Volume Three	—	2008	2:27
"Ain't No Kind of Love"	Chris Conley, Saves the Day	Saves the Day	Saves the Day	2013	2:58
"All I'm Losing Is Me"	Bryan Newman, Chris Conley, David Soloway, Eben D'Amico, Ted Alexander	Stay What You Are	Rob Schnapf	2001	3:22
"All-Star Me"	Chris Conley, Saves the Day	Through Being Cool	Steve Evetts	1999	1:43
"Always Ten Feet Tall"	Chris Conley	Can't Slow Down	Steve Evetts	1998	3:24
"An Afternoon Laughing"^{[B]}	—	Saves the Day (EP)	—	1997	2:12
"Anywhere with You"	Chris Conley, Saves the Day	In Reverie	Rob Schnapf	2003	2:32
"As Your Ghost Takes Flight"	Bryan Newman, Chris Conley, David Soloway, Eben D'Amico, Ted Alexander	Stay What You Are	Rob Schnapf	2001	2:25
"At Your Funeral"	Bryan Newman, Chris Conley, David Soloway, Eben D'Amico, Ted Alexander	Stay What You Are	Rob Schnapf	2001	3:09
"Banned from the Back Porch"	Chris Conley, Saves the Day	Through Being Cool	Steve Evetts	1999	2:59
"Because You Are No Other"	Chris Conley, Saves the Day	Under the Boards	Eric Stenman, Marc Hudson, Saves the Day	2007	1:59
"Beyond All of Time"	Chris Conley, Saves the Day	Saves the Day	Saves the Day	2013	3:29
"Blindfolded"	Chris Conley	Can't Slow Down	Steve Evetts	1998	3:13
"Blossom"^{[A]}	Chris Conley, Saves the Day	In Reverie	Rob Schnapf	2003	3:09
"Bones"	Chris Conley, Saves the Day	Sound the Alarm	Steve Evetts	2006	2:23
"Bye Bye Baby"	Chris Conley, Saves the Day	Under the Boards	Eric Stenman, Marc Hudson, Saves the Day	2007	2:36
"Can't Stay the Same"	Chris Conley, Saves the Day	Under the Boards	Eric Stenman, Marc Hudson, Saves the Day	2007	2:48
"Cars & Calories"	Bryan Newman, Chris Conley, David Soloway, Eben D'Amico, Ted Alexander	Stay What You Are	Rob Schnapf	2001	2:45
"Certain Tragedy"	Bryan Newman, Chris Conley, David Soloway, Eben D'Amico, Ted Alexander	Stay What You Are	Rob Schnapf	2001	2:27
"Certain Tragedy" (acoustic)	Bryan Newman, Chris Conley, David Soloway, Eben D'Amico, Ted Alexander	Bug Sessions Volume One	—	2006	2:42
"Chameleon"	Chris Conley, Saves the Day	Daybreak	Marc Hudson, Saves the Day	2011	3:23
"Chameleon" (acoustic)	Chris Conley, Saves the Day	Daybreak Acoustic	—	2011	3:24
"Cheer" (Descendents cover)	Bill Stevenson	Ups & Downs: Early Recordings and B-Sides	—	2004	2:39
"Clash City Rockers" (The Clash cover)^{[B]}	Joe Strummer, Mick Jones	City Rockers: A Tribute to The Clash	—	1999	2:14
"Don't Go Outside"^{[A]}	Chris Conley, Saves the Day	In Reverie	Rob Schnapf	2003	3:10
"Coconut" (acoustic)	Chris Conley, Saves the Day	Bug Sessions Volume Two	—	2008	2:52
"Collision"	Chris Conley	Can't Slow Down	Steve Evetts	1998	1:25
"Dave Feels Right"^{[B]}	—	Saves the Day (EP)	—	1997	2:29
"Daybreak"	Chris Conley, Saves the Day	Daybreak	Marc Hudson, Saves the Day	2011	10:46
"Daybreak" (acoustic)	Chris Conley, Saves the Day	Daybreak Acoustic	—	2011	10:43
"Deciding"	Chris Conley	Can't Slow Down	Steve Evetts	1998	1:55
"Deciding" (acoustic)	Chris Conley	Bug Sessions Volume Three	—	2008	2:01
"Delusional"	Chris Conley, Saves the Day	Sound the Alarm	Steve Evetts	2006	2:07
"Deranged & Desperate"	Chris Conley, Saves the Day	Daybreak	Marc Hudson, Saves the Day	2011	2:25
"Deranged & Desperate" (acoustic)	Chris Conley, Saves the Day	Daybreak Acoustic	—	2011	2:26
"Diseased"	Chris Conley, Saves the Day	Sound the Alarm	Steve Evetts	2006	2:12
"Do You Know What I Love the Most?"	Ted Alexander, Saves the Day	Through Being Cool	Steve Evetts	1999	1:34
"Don't Go Outside"^{[A]}	Chris Conley, Saves the Day	In Reverie	Rob Schnapf	2003	1:55
"Don't Know Why"	Chris Conley, Saves the Day	Sound the Alarm	Steve Evetts	2006	3:22
"Don't Know Why" (acoustic)	Chris Conley, Saves the Day	Bug Sessions Volume Two	—	2008	3:30
"Driving in the Dark"	Chris Conley, Saves the Day	In Reverie	Rob Schnapf	2003	3:14
"Dying Day"	Chris Conley, Saves the Day	Sound the Alarm	Steve Evetts	2006	2:21
"Dying Day" (acoustic)	Chris Conley, Saves the Day	Bug Sessions Volume Three	—	2008	2:44
"E"	Chris Conley, Saves the Day	Daybreak	Marc Hudson, Saves the Day	2011	3:03
"E" (acoustic)	Chris Conley, Saves the Day	Daybreak Acoustic	—	2011	3:04
"East Coast"^{[B]}	—	Saves the Day (EP)	—	1997	1:39
"Eulogy"	Chris Conley, Saves the Day	Sound the Alarm	Steve Evetts	2006	3:22
"Firefly"	Bryan Newman, Chris Conley, David Soloway, Eben D'Amico, Ted Alexander	Stay What You Are	Rob Schnapf	2001	2:51
"Freakish"	Bryan Newman, Chris Conley, David Soloway, Eben D'Amico, Ted Alexander	Stay What You Are	Rob Schnapf	2001	3:47
"Freakish" (acoustic)	Bryan Newman, Chris Conley, David Soloway, Eben D'Amico, Ted Alexander	Bug Sessions Volume One	—	2006	4:06
"Get Fucked Up"	Chris Conley, Saves the Day	Under the Boards	Eric Stenman, Marc Hudson, Saves the Day	2007	3:03
"Getaway"	Chris Conley, Saves the Day	Under the Boards	Eric Stenman, Marc Hudson, Saves the Day	2007	2:46
"Handsome Boy"	Chris Conley	Saves the Day (EP)	—	1997	1:07
"Handsome Boy"	Chris Conley	Can't Slow Down	Steve Evetts	1998	1:00
"Head for the Hills"	Chris Conley, Saves the Day	Sound the Alarm	Steve Evetts	2006	2:50
"Hell Is Here"	Chris Conley, Saves the Day	Sound the Alarm	Steve Evetts	2006	3:36
"Hold"	Chris Conley	I'm Sorry I'm Leaving (EP)	—	1999	2:22
"Hold" (acoustic)	Chris Conley	Bug Sessions Volume Three	—	2008	2:37
"Hold" (electric)^{[C]}	Chris Conley	Daybreak	—	2011	2:38
"Holly Hox, Forget Me Nots"	Chris Conley, Saves the Day	Through Being Cool	Steve Evetts	1999	2:37
"Hot Time in Delaware"	Chris Conley	Saves the Day (EP)	—	1997	1:27
"Hot Time in Delaware"	Chris Conley	Can't Slow Down	Steve Evetts	1998	1:46
"Houses and Billboards"	Chris Conley	Can't Slow Down	Steve Evetts	1998	3:13
"I Melt with You" (Modern English cover)	Modern English	I'm Sorry I'm Leaving (EP)	—	1999	2:57
"I'm Sorry I'm Leaving"^{[B]}	Chris Conley	I'm Sorry I'm Leaving (EP)	—	1999	2:48
"In My Waking Life"	Chris Conley, Saves the Day	In Reverie	Rob Schnapf	2003	2:49
"In My Waking Life" (acoustic)	Chris Conley, Saves the Day	Bug Sessions Volume One	—	2006	2:45
"In Reverie"	Chris Conley, Saves the Day	In Reverie	Rob Schnapf	2003	2:27
"In the In Between"	Chris Conley, Saves the Day	Saves the Day	Saves the Day	2013	2:53
"Jessie & My Whetstone"^{[B]}	Chris Conley	I'm Sorry I'm Leaving (EP)	—	1999	2:06
"Jodie"	Chris Conley	Can't Slow Down	Steve Evetts	1998	4:36
"Jodie" (acoustic)	Chris Conley	Bug Sessions Volume One	—	2006	4:06
"Jukebox Breakdown"	Bryan Newman, Chris Conley, David Soloway, Eben D'Amico, Ted Alexander	Stay What You Are	Rob Schnapf	2001	3:04
"Kaleidoscope"	Chris Conley, Saves the Day	Under the Boards	Eric Stenman, Marc Hudson, Saves the Day	2007	3:18
"Let It All Go"	Chris Conley, Saves the Day	Daybreak	Marc Hudson, Saves the Day	2011	2:46
"Let It All Go" (acoustic)	Chris Conley, Saves the Day	Daybreak Acoustic	—	2011	2:48
"Living Without Love"	Chris Conley, Saves the Day	Daybreak	Marc Hudson, Saves the Day	2011	1:58
"Living Without Love" (acoustic)	Chris Conley, Saves the Day	Daybreak Acoustic	—	2011	1:58
"Lonely Nights"	Chris Conley, Saves the Day	Under the Boards	Eric Stenman, Marc Hudson, Saves the Day	2007	3:05
"Lucky Number"	Chris Conley, Saves the Day	Saves the Day	Saves the Day	2013	2:54
"Monkey"	Chris Conley, Saves the Day	In Reverie	Rob Schnapf	2003	3:22
"Morning in the Moonlight"	Chris Conley, Saves the Day	In Reverie	Rob Schnapf	2003	1:54
"My Sweet Fracture"	Chris Conley, Saves the Day	Through Being Cool	Steve Evetts	1999	3:52
"My Sweet Fracture" (acoustic)	Chris Conley, Saves the Day	Bug Sessions Volume One	—	2006	4:03
"Nebraska Bricks"	Chris Conley	Can't Slow Down	Steve Evetts	1998	2:04
"Nightingale"	Bryan Newman, Chris Conley, David Soloway, Eben D'Amico, Ted Alexander	Stay What You Are	Rob Schnapf	2001	3:36
"O"	Chris Conley, Saves the Day	Daybreak	Marc Hudson, Saves the Day	2011	2:37
"O" (acoustic)	Chris Conley, Saves the Day	Daybreak Acoustic	—	2011	2:37
"Obsolete"	Chris Conley	Can't Slow Down	Steve Evetts	1998	1:58
"Radio"	Chris Conley, Saves the Day	Under the Boards	Eric Stenman, Marc Hudson, Saves the Day	2007	2:13
"Radio" (acoustic)	Chris Conley, Saves the Day	Bug Sessions Volume Three	—	2008	2:29
"Remember"	Chris Conley, Saves the Day	Saves the Day	Saves the Day	2013	2:49
"Ring Pop"	Chris Conley, Saves the Day	Saves the Day	Saves the Day	2013	2:33
"Rise"	Chris Conley, Saves the Day	In Reverie	Rob Schnapf	2003	3:12
"Rocks Tonic Juice Magic"	Chris Conley, Saves the Day	Through Being Cool	Steve Evetts	1999	3:27
"Rocks Tonic Juice Magic" (acoustic)	Chris Conley, Saves the Day	Bug Sessions Volume Two	—	2008	4:12
"Say You'll Never Leave"	Chris Conley, Saves the Day	Sound the Alarm	Steve Evetts	2006	2:20
"See You"	Bryan Newman, Chris Conley, David Soloway, Eben D'Amico, Ted Alexander	Stay What You Are	Rob Schnapf	2001	2:08
"Third Engine" (acoustic)	Bryan Newman, Chris Conley, David Soloway, Eben D'Amico, Ted Alexander	Bug Sessions Volume Three	—	2008	2:18
"Seeing It This Way"	Chris Conley	Can't Slow Down	Steve Evetts	1998	1:32
"Sell My Old Clothes, I'm Off to Heaven"^{[B]}	Chris Conley, Saves the Day	Another Year on the Streets	—	2000	3:24
"Sell My Old Clothes, I'm Off to Heaven" (acoustic)	Chris Conley, Saves the Day	Bug Sessions Volume One	—	2006	3:23
"Shattered"	Chris Conley, Saves the Day	Sound the Alarm	Steve Evetts	2006	3:08
"She"	Chris Conley, Saves the Day	In Reverie	Rob Schnapf	2003	2:34
"Shoulder to the Wheel"	Chris Conley, Saves the Day	Through Being Cool	Steve Evetts	1999	3:19
"Sometimes, New Jersey"	Chris Conley	Saves the Day (EP)	—	1997	1:13
"Sometimes, New Jersey"	Chris Conley	Can't Slow Down	Steve Evetts	1997	1:09
"Sonic Reducer"	Gene O'Connor, David Thomas, Stiv Bators	Tony Hawk's American Wasteland	—	2005	3:03
"Sound the Alarm"	Chris Conley, Saves the Day	Sound the Alarm	Steve Evetts	2006	3:06
"Stand in the Stars"	Chris Conley, Saves the Day	Saves the Day	Saves the Day	2013	3:39
"Stay"	Chris Conley, Saves the Day	Under the Boards	Eric Stenman, Marc Hudson, Saves the Day	2007	3:25
"Stay" (acoustic)	Chris Conley, Saves the Day	Bug Sessions Volume Two	—	2008	3:34
"Stay" (electric)^{[C]}	Chris Conley, Saves the Day	Daybreak	—	2011	3:38
"Supernova"	Chris Conley, Saves the Day	Saves the Day	Saves the Day	2013	3:46
"Take Our Cars Now!"^{[B]}	Chris Conley	I'm Sorry I'm Leaving (EP)	—	1999	2:38
"Take Our Cars Now!" (acoustic)	Chris Conley, Saves the Day	Bug Sessions Volume Two	—	2008	3:03
"The Art of Misplacing Firearms"^{[B]}	—	The Rebirth of Hardcore: 1999	—	1999	2:06
"The Choke"	Chris Conley	Can't Slow Down	Steve Evetts	1998	2:35
"The End"	Chris Conley, Saves the Day	Sound the Alarm	Steve Evetts	2006	1:54
"The Last Lie I Told"	Chris Conley, Saves the Day	Through Being Cool	Steve Evetts	1999	2:23
"The Tide of Our Times"	Chris Conley, Saves the Day	Saves the Day	Saves the Day	2013	2:25
"The Vast Spoils of America (From the Badlands Through the Ocean)"	Dave Soloway, Saves the Day	Through Being Cool	Steve Evetts	1999	3:08
"The Way His Collar Falls"^{[B]}	Chris Conley	I'm Sorry I'm Leaving (EP)	—	1999	2:46
"This Is Not an Exit"	Bryan Newman, Chris Conley, David Soloway, Eben D'Amico, Ted Alexander	Stay What You Are	Rob Schnapf	2001	3:56
"This Is Not an Exit" (acoustic)	Bryan Newman, Chris Conley, David Soloway, Eben D'Amico, Ted Alexander	Bug Sessions Volume Two	—	2008	4:29
"Third Engine"	Chris Conley, Saves the Day	Through Being Cool	Steve Evetts	1999	3:40
"Third Engine" (acoustic)	Chris Conley, Saves the Day	Bug Sessions Volume Three	—	2008	3:30
"Three Miles Down"	Chris Conley	Can't Slow Down	Steve Evetts	1998	1:36
"Through Being Cool"	Chris Conley, Saves the Day	Through Being Cool	Steve Evetts	1999	2:04
"Tomorrow Too Late"	Chris Conley, Saves the Day	In Reverie	Rob Schnapf	2003	3:31
"Turning Over in My Tomb"	Chris Conley, Saves the Day	Under the Boards	Eric Stenman, Marc Hudson, Saves the Day	2007	3:26
"U"	Chris Conley, Saves the Day	Daybreak	Marc Hudson, Saves the Day	2011	2:39
"U" (acoustic)	Chris Conley, Saves the Day	Daybreak Acoustic	—	2011	2:39
"Under the Boards"	Chris Conley, Saves the Day	Under the Boards	Eric Stenman, Marc Hudson, Saves the Day	2007	3:15
"Undress Me"	Chris Conley, Saves the Day	Daybreak	Marc Hudson, Saves the Day	2011	4:55
"Undress Me" (acoustic)	Chris Conley, Saves the Day	Daybreak Acoustic	—	2011	4:50
"Ups & Downs"^{[B]}	Saves the Day	Another Year on the Streets Volume 2	Rob Schnapf	2001	3:19
"Verona"	Chris Conley, Saves the Day	Saves the Day	Saves the Day	2013	2:23
"Web in Front" (Archers of Loaf cover)	—	Friends	—	2014	2:04
"Wednesday the Third"	Chris Conley, Saves the Day	In Reverie	Rob Schnapf	2003	2:39
"Wednesday the Third" (acoustic)	Chris Conley, Saves the Day	Bug Sessions Volume Two	—	2008	4:09
"What Went Wrong"	Chris Conley, Saves the Day	In Reverie	Rob Schnapf	2003	2:49
"When I'm Not There"	Chris Conley, Saves the Day	Under the Boards	Eric Stenman, Marc Hudson, Saves the Day	2007	2:46
"When It Isn't Like It Should Be..."^{[B]}	—	Saves the Day (EP)	—	1997	1:55
"Where Are You?"	Chris Conley, Saves the Day	In Reverie	Rob Schnapf	2003	1:46
"Woe"	Chris Conley, Saves the Day	Under the Boards	Eric Stenman, Marc Hudson, Saves the Day	2007	3:05
"Xenophobic Blind Left Hook"	Chris Conley, Saves the Day	Saves the Day	Saves the Day	2013	3:10
"You Vandal"	Chris Conley, Saves the Day	Through Being Cool	Steve Evetts	1999	2:28
"You Vandal" (acoustic)	Chris Conley, Saves the Day	Bug Sessions Volume One	—	2006	2:21
"Z"	Chris Conley, Saves the Day	Daybreak	Marc Hudson, Saves the Day	2011	2:55
"Z" (acoustic)	Chris Conley, Saves the Day	Daybreak Acoustic	—	2011	2:51

== See also ==
- Saves the Day discography
