= Saves the Day discography =

- Studio albums: 9
- EPs: 5
- Compilation albums: 2
- Singles
- Music videos: 10

The discography of American rock band Saves the Day consists of nine studio albums, two compilation albums, five extended plays, and nine singles.

== Albums ==
=== Studio albums ===
List of studio albums, with selected chart positions
Title	Album details	Peak chart positions					Sales
Title	Album details	US	US Alt	US Ind.	US Rock	US Sales	Sales
Can't Slow Down	Released: August 11, 1998; Label: Equal Vision (EVR 042); Format: CD, DL, LP	—	—	—	—	—	US: 8,000 (as of November 1999)
Through Being Cool	Released: November 2, 1999; Label: Equal Vision (EVR 054); Format: CD, DL, LP	—	—	—	—	—	US: 50,000
Stay What You Are	Released: July 10, 2001; Label: Vagrant (422 860 953); Format: CD, DL, LP	100	—	—	—	100	US: 120,000
In Reverie	Released: September 16, 2003; Label: DreamWorks (b0001115-12/dw-0001-2); Format: CD, DL, LP	27	—	4	—	27	US: 34,000
Sound the Alarm	Released: April 11, 2006; Label: Vagrant (VR433); Format: CD, DL, LP	67	—	4	20	67	US: 49,916
Under the Boards	Released: October 30, 2007; Label: Vagrant (VR 476); Format: CD/DVD-V, DL, LP	119	—	11	—	—	
Daybreak	Released: September 13, 2011; Label: Razor & Tie (793018331623); Format: CD, DL, LP	100	17	22	29	—	
Saves the Day	Released: September 17, 2013; Label: Equal Vision/Rory (EVR 268/EVR 269); Format: CD, DL, LP	56	15	9	22	56	
9	Released: October 26, 2018; Label: Equal Vision; Format: CD, DL, LP	—	—	16	—	96	
"—" denotes a release that did not chart or was not released in that territory.

=== Compilation albums ===
List of studio albums, with selected chart positions
Title	Album details	Peak chart positions
Title	Album details	US Indie
Ups & Downs: Early Recordings and B-Sides	Released: August 24, 2004; Label: Vagrant (VR-0398-2); Format: CD, DL, LP	16
Bug Sessions	Released: July 22, 2008; Label: Vagrant; Format: DL	—
"—" denotes a release that did not chart or was not released in that territory.

== Extended plays ==
List of extended plays
Title	EP details
Saves the Day	Released: April 1997; Label: Self-released; Format: CS
I'm Sorry I'm Leaving	Released: July 1, 1999; Label: Immigrant Sun (KILL 10); Format: CD, 7" vinyl
Bug Sessions Volume One	Released: February 2006; Label: Self-released; Format: CD
Bug Sessions Volume Two	Released: 2008; Label: Self-released; Format: CD
Bug Sessions Volume Three	Released: 2008; Label: Self-released; Format: CD
1984 EP	Released: October 14, 2010; Label: Self-released; Format: DL

== Singles ==
Title	Year	Peak chart positions			Album
Title	Year	SCO	UK	UK Indie	Album
"At Your Funeral"	2002	71	79	16	Stay What You Are
"Freakish"	2002	—	112	33	Stay What You Are
"Anywhere with You"	2003	—	—	—	In Reverie
"Can't Stay the Same"	2007	—	—	—	Under the Boards
"Living Without Love"	2011	—	—	—	Daybreak
"The Tide of Our Times"	2014	—	—	—	Saves the Day
"Rendezvous"	2018	—	—	—	9
"Kerouac & Cassady"	2018	—	—	—	9
"Side by Side"	2018	—	—	—	9
"Invader" (featuring Walter Schreifels)	2026	—	—	—	TBA
"—" denotes a release that did not chart or was not released in that territory.

== Music videos ==
List of music videos, showing year released and director
Title	Year	Director
"Shoulder to the Wheel"	2000	Darren Doane
"At Your Funeral"	2002	Maureen Egan
"Freakish"	2002	
"Anywhere with You"	2003	
"The End"	2006	
"Lonely Nights"	2008	
"Deranged & Desperate"	2011	
"In the In Between"	2014	Sean Stout
"Invader"	2026	Sean Stout

== See also ==
- List of songs recorded by Saves the Day
