= Bug Sessions =

Compilation album by Saves the Day
- Released: 2006 (volume 1); 2008 (volumes 2 & 3)
- Recorded: 2005–2007
- Length: 65:19
- Label: Self-released
- Producer: Various

Saves the Day chronology
Under the Boards (2007)	Bug Sessions (2006)	Daybreak (2011)

Bug Sessions is a compilation album of three EPs by indie rock band Saves the Day. The EPs consist primarily of acoustic renditions of the band's songs.

== History ==
The first Bug Sessions volume was announced in February 2006, and was sold on the band's 2006 tour dates with Moneen and Circa Survive as well as on the 2006 Warped Tour. The EPs were originally intended to be full-band acoustic studio recordings, however the first volume was the only one to follow this format. The tracks were recorded at the band's studio, The Electric Ladybug. All songs are played on the acoustic guitar, and some also include drums and bass.

Volumes 2 and 3 of the Bug Sessions were recorded on the band's acoustic tour in fall 2007 with only lead singer/guitarist Chris Conley and then-guitarist David Soloway. The two volumes were released simultaneously in 2008. All tracks on the two volumes are acoustic-only.

Only a limited number of all 3 volumes were made available and sold exclusively on the band's tour dates. In early 2009, the Bug Sessions compilation of all three EPs was released on the iTunes music service.

== Track listings ==
All tracks are written by Saves the Day.

Bug Sessions Vol. 1
No.	Title	Originally appeared on	Length
1.	"Certain Tragedy"	Stay What You Are (2001)	2:42
2.	"In My Waking Life"	In Reverie (2003)	2:45
3.	"Freakish"	Stay What You Are	4:06
4.	"You Vandal"	Through Being Cool (1999)	2:21
5.	"Sell My Old Clothes, I'm Off to Heaven"	Ups & Downs: Early Recordings and B-Sides (2004)	3:23
6.	"My Sweet Fracture"	Through Being Cool	4:04
7.	"Jodie"	Can't Slow Down (1998)	4:06

Bug Sessions Vol. 2
No.	Title	Originally appeared on	Length
1.	"This is Not an Exit"	Stay What You Are	4:30
2.	"Rocks Tonic Juice Magic"	Through Being Cool	4:12
3.	"Wednesday the 3rd"	In Reverie	4:09
4.	"Stay"	Under the Boards (2007)	3:35
5.	"Coconut"	In Reverie	2:53
6.	"Don't Know Why"	Sound the Alarm (2006)	3:30
7.	"Take Our Cars Now!"	I'm Sorry I'm Leaving (1999)	3:04

Bug Sessions Vol. 3
No.	Title	Originally appeared on	Length
1.	"Radio"	Under the Boards	2:29
2.	"Deciding"	Can't Slow Down	2:02
3.	"Hold"	I'm Sorry I'm Leaving	2:37
4.	"Dying Day"	Sound the Alarm	2:44
5.	"A Drag in D Flat"	Ups & Downs: Early Recordings and B-Sides	2:28
6.	"Third Engine"	Through Being Cool	3:31
7.	"See You"	Stay What You Are	2:19

== Personnel ==
Volume 1

- Chris Conley - vocals, guitar
- David Soloway - guitar
- Manuel Carrero - bass
- Pete Parada - drums

Volumes 2 and 3

- Chris Conley - vocals, guitar
- David Soloway - guitar
