= Dr Manhattan (band) =

American rock band

Dr. Manhattan
- Origin: Wauconda, Illinois, USA
- Genres: Alternative rock, indie rock, electronic
- Years active: 2005–2010, 2011, 2014–
- Labels: Vagrant Records, Cassette Deck
- Members: Matt Engers; Adam Engers; Andrew Morrison; Nick Vombrack
- Past members: Matt Parrish; Marc Esses

Dr. Manhattan is an American rock band from Wauconda, Illinois. Their name is a reference to the character from Alan Moore's Watchmen comic books.

== History ==
Brothers Matt and Adam Engers met Andrew Morrison and Nick Vombrack while they were all students at Wauconda High School. They first began playing together in 2005, and self-released an EP the following year. In 2007 they played the Warped Tour and signed with Vagrant Records, who released their self-titled debut in 2008. They appeared at The Bamboozle and played the Warped Tour again in 2008.

The music video for their first single, "Big Chomper, Big Chomper," was the winning freshman video for the week of August 25, 2008 on MTVU.com.

In August 2009, the band released their second album, Jam Dreams on Cassette Deck Records. The album was produced by Saves the Day front man Chris Conley. Prior to the album's release, drummer Nick Vombrack amicably left the band and was replaced by ex-Flowers For Dorian drummer Marc Esses. Matt Parrish, from the instrumental band Piglet, was later added to the group as a second guitarist. After Esses left the band, Parrish became the drummer. On November 6, 2010 the band announced that they were calling it quits. On December 23, 2010, they played their final show at the Beat Kitchen in Chicago, Illinois.

On May 13, 2011, Dr. Manhattan reunited to play at the E.S. Jungle in Indianapolis, Indiana for Piradical Productions' annual Punk Rock Prom. They reunited once more on December 23, 2011 to play a show at Sideouts Bar & Eatery in Island Lake, IL. The band opened for The Front Bottoms at Durty Nellie's in Palatine, Illinois on January 11, 2014.

Their song, "Big Chomper Big Chomper", was also featured in the video game Watch Dogs.

== Members ==
- Matt Engers - vocals, guitar (2005–Present)
- Adam Engers - bass, vocals (2005–Present)
- Andrew Morrison - keyboards, percussion, vocals (2005–Present)
- Nick Vombrack - drums (2005–2009) (Dec. 23rd 2010–Present)

=== Former members ===
- Matt Parrish - guitar (2009), drums (2010)
- Marc Esses - drums, percussion (2009)

== Discography ==
- Self-Released Demo (Self-released, 2005)
- For the Lonely Lest the Wiser EP (Self-released, 2006)
- Are You Bald? EP (Vagrant Records, 2007)
- Dr Manhattan (Vagrant Records, 2008)
- Day Trotter Sessions 12/23/08 (Day Trotter, 2008)
- Jam Dreams (Cassette Deck, 2009)
- BOLO YODO EP (Self-released, July 8, 2014)
