= Dr Manhattan (album) =

Album by Dr Manhattan

Studio album by Dr Manhattan
- Released: March 11, 2008
- Recorded: 2007–2008
- Genres: Indie rock, alternative rock, electronic
- Length: 44:02
- Label: Vagrant
- Producer: Jonathan Alvin

Dr Manhattan chronology
Are You Bald?EP (2007)	Dr Manhattan (2008)	Jam Dreams (2009)

Professional ratings
Review scores
Source	Rating
AbsolutePunk	Author of Review-(73%); Members- (90%)

Dr Manhattan is the debut studio album by American band Dr Manhattan released on March 11, 2008, by Vagrant Records. The album was released after two previous EP's "For The Lonely Lest The Wiser" and "Are You Bald?" The first single released for the album was "Big Chomper, Big Chomper". The song's music video premiered on mtvU on August 25, 2008. The album marks a departure from the band's early post-hardcore sound into a more Indie rock and alternative rock style, The album features three re-recordings of tracks from the group's first EP being "Dirty, Scandalous, Dirty", "The Party's Opinion" and "To Feel Cozy Surrounded by Cats" (previously titled "To Feel Cozy Surrounded by Wolves")

== Track listing ==
No.	Title	Length
1.	"Big Chomper, Big Chomper"	3:15
2.	"You Put The I In Team"	4:55
3.	"Dirty, Scandalous, Dirty"	4:02
4.	"Claims Should Echo"	3:10
5.	"Gunpowder: A Ballet"	5:07
6.	"The Party's Opinion"	2:39
7.	"Tracey's Buns"	3:14
8.	"To Feel Cozy Surrounded By Cats"	3:34
9.	"Baton Rouge"	4:17
10.	"Minds Like Ours"	4:56
11.	"Pepper"	4:53
Total length:		44:02
