= Jam Dreams =

Studio album by Dr Manhattan
- Released: August 18, 2009; September 25, 2014 (Re-issue)
- Recorded: Late 2008, Early 2009
- Genre: Alternative rock Electronic
- Length: 34:52
- Label: Cassette Deck/Have Fun Records
- Producer: Chris Conley, Dr Manhattan

Dr Manhattan chronology
Dr Manhattan (2008)	Jam Dreams (2009)	BOLO YODO (2014)

Jam Dreams is an alternative rock album recorded by American band Dr Manhattan, co-produced by Chris Conley (frontman of Saves the Day). It was released on August 18, 2009 by Cassette Deck. It was re-issued on vinyl through Have Fun Records on September 25, 2014.

== Track listing ==
1. "Electraumatized" - 2:02
2. "Texas" - 3:06
3. "After All" - 4:09
4. "Mailman" - 4:03
5. "I'm High" - 2:44
6. "Cowgirl" - 2:38
7. "Misses Stewart" - 2:44
8. "Biscuits and Groovy" - 3:22
9. "Listen Up" - 0:41
10. "Man With a Woman's Chest" - 3:02
11. "Hard Time" - 2:53
12. "Camping Ground" - 3:34
