= Under the Boards =

Studio album by Saves the Day
- Released: October 30, 2007
- Genres: Emo; pop punk; indie rock
- Length: 37:37
- Label: Vagrant
- Producers: Marc Hudson; Eric Stenman; Saves the Day

Saves the Day chronology
| Sound the Alarm (2006) | Under the Boards (2007) | Bug Sessions (2008) |

Under the Boards is the sixth studio album by the American rock band Saves the Day.

== Background ==
On December 30, 2006, vocalist/guitarist Chris Conley mentioned that Saves the Day were "workin[g] on new material." On February 1, 2007, Conley said the group had finished 13 songs demoing for the next album, which would be titled Under the Boards. The group were aiming to record in late spring and release the album in the fall. In April and May, the band went a co-headlining tour with Say Anything. During the tour, a live video of a new song entitled "Can't Stay the Same" was posted online. Following the tour, the band began recording Under the Boards.

== Composition and recording ==
A post on the website Punknews.org said of the album and its relationship to the band's previous album, Sound the Alarm and subsequent album, Daybreak:

The band is co-producing the 13 songs with Marc Hudson and Eric Stenman at their studio in northern California. Under The Boards continues a story about self-discovery that began with last year's Sound the Alarm and will conclude with a third album, Daybreak, to be released next year. Says frontman Chris Conley: "Sound The Alarm is an expression of discontent. Under the Boards is reflection and remorse. Daybreak is acceptance." Conley notes that parts of the album are darker than Sound the Alarm as it is the transitional chapter of the trilogy ("like The Empire Strikes Back"), but adds, "It's going to be an interesting listen. There are a lot of different moods in these songs." Says Soloway, "'Woe', is the heaviest song we've ever written and two of the songs, 'Get Fucked Up' and 'Can't Stay The Same', might be the most poppy tunes we've ever done.

Under the Boards is the second album of a trilogy with the theme of self-discovery. It was preceded by Sound the Alarm (2006) and followed by Daybreak (2011). Conley said that Sound the Alarm was "an expression of discontent. Under the Boards is reflection and remorse. Daybreak is acceptance." Conley also said that the three-album concept was: "just a bit of a therapeutic experiment".

I felt like all twisted up and broken inside and just angry and confused and depressed and sad and I couldn’t really deal with the world or myself. So I was just like this has got to end, I have to at least try and get a grip on the world and on myself. So I dove into the depths of my mind and brought out what I was finding ... Under The Boards dealt with how all of that was making my life unbearable, and I realized I had to change so that album was the transitional part, starting to transition out of that dark place, because you realize how its effecting your life.

Conley said Under the Boards was the "most honest and therapeutic music I've ever made. It was also written during the hardest time in my life." Several of the album's tracks were written as far back as 2003, immediately after the In Reverie sessions. The song "Woe", for example, was the first song Conley wrote after the completion of In Reverie. Conley called "Woe" the "darkest song on the record and the darkest song I've ever written. And it is the most cathartic lyric I've ever written." Conley said "Turning Over in My Tomb" was "the moment when I decide to stick around and face the facts and learn how to make the most of this life, instead of being crushed by the weight of my history."

== Release ==
"Can't Stay the Same" was posted on the group's Myspace profile on August 17, 2007. On September 7, "Get Fucked Up" was posted on the group's Myspace profile. On September 18, Under the Boards was announced for release. In October, the group went on an acoustic tour, alongside Single File and Dr Manhattan. On October 19, "Radio" was made available for streaming via the band's e-card. Under the Boards was made available for streaming via the group's Myspace profile on October 23, and was released on October 30 through Vagrant. The album features a DVD, which documents the creation of the album. "Can't Stay the Same" was released to radio on November 5. Between late March and early May 2008, the group co-headlined the Bamboozle Roadshow with Armor for Sleep. In April, the band appeared at the Bamboozle Left festival.

== Reception ==
Professional ratings
Review scores
| Source | Rating |
|---|---|
| AbsolutePunk | 86% |
| AllMusic | 3.5/5 stars |
| Alternative Press | 3.5/5 stars |
| The A.V. Club | C |
| Exclaim! | Favorable |
| Melodic | 3/5 stars |
| Ox-Fanzine | Favorable |
| PopMatters | 6/10 stars |
| Punknews.org | 3.5/5 stars |
| Spin | Favorable |

The album charted at number 119 on the Billboard 200.

== Track listing ==
All lyrics written by Christopher Conley, all songs written by Saves the Day.

1. "Under the Boards" – 3:15
2. "Radio" – 2:13
3. "Can't Stay the Same" – 2:48
4. "Get Fucked Up" – 3:03
5. "When I'm Not There" – 2:46
6. "Lonely Nights" – 3:05
7. "Bye Bye Baby" – 2:36
8. "Stay" – 3:25
9. "Getaway" – 2:46
10. "Because You Are No Other" – 1:59
11. "Kaleidoscope" – 3:18
12. "Woe" – 3:05
13. "Turning Over in My Tomb" – 3:26

== Charts ==
Chart performance for Under the Boards
| Chart (2007) | Peak position |
|---|---|
| US Billboard 200 | 119 |
| US Independent Albums (Billboard) | 11 |
