= Are You Bald? =

Are You Bald? - EP

EP by Dr Manhattan
- Released: December 11, 2007
- Recorded: Chicago, Illinois
- Genres: Post-hardcore; Alternative; Electronic
- Length: 9:29
- Label: Vagrant
- Producers: Daniel Good; Dr Manhattan

Dr Manhattan chronology
For the Lonely Lest the Wiser (2005)	Are You Bald? - EP (2007)	Dr Manhattan (2008)

Are You Bald? - EP was a promotional EP released on Vagrant Records by the American rock quartet Dr Manhattan. The EP was released on iTunes on December 11, 2007. The EP included one brand new song, one old song that was re-recorded for the band's debut, and one song off of their first EP, For the Lonely Lest the Wiser.

== Track listing ==
No.	Title	Length
1.	"Big Chomper, Big Chomper"	3:15
2.	"Claims Should Echo"	3:09
3.	"Breath of an Epoch"	3:05
Total length:		9:29
