= Chris Conley (musician) =

American musician (born 1980)

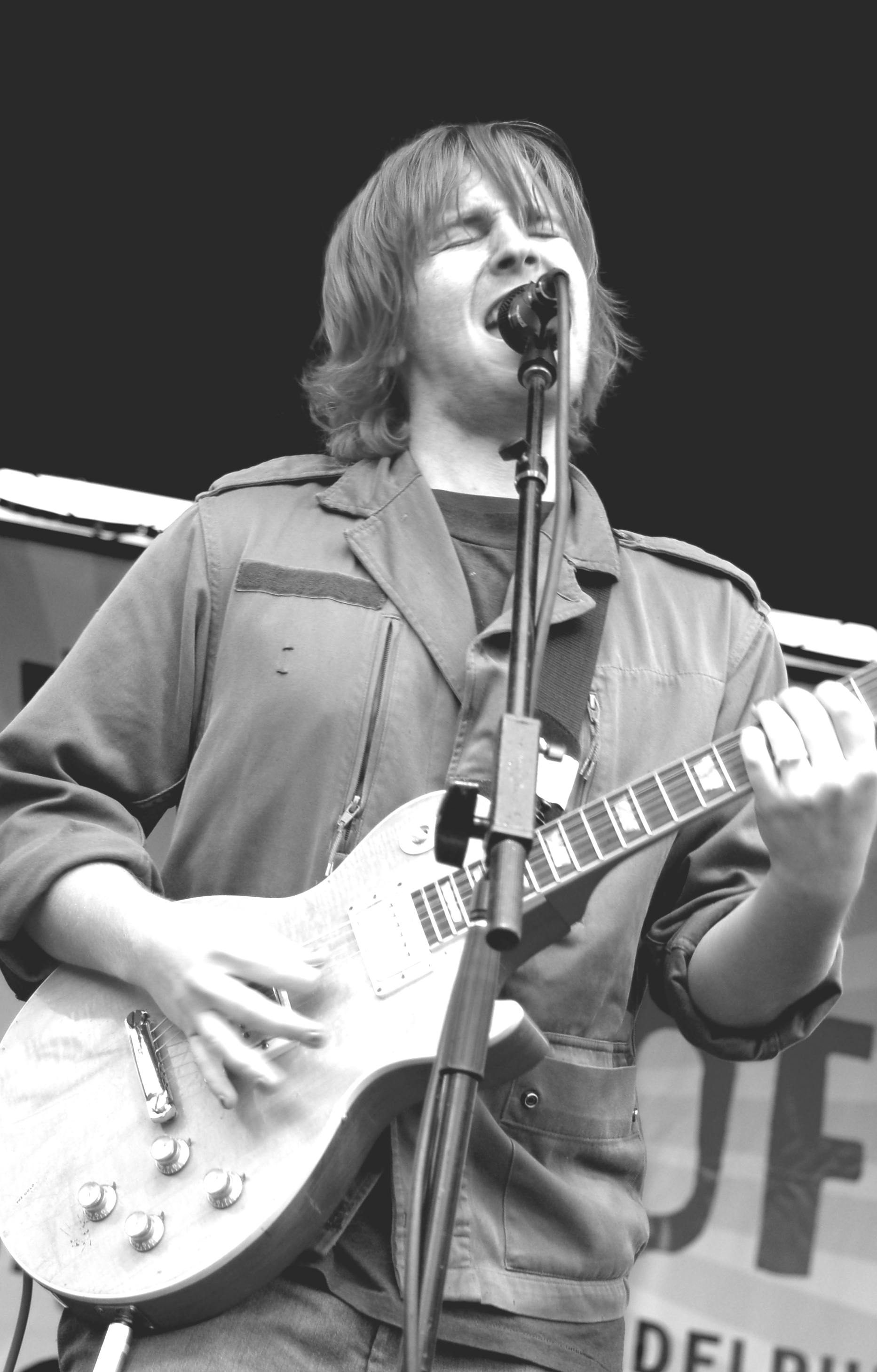
- Conley in 2006

Background information
- Born: Christopher Lane Conley; February 29, 1980 (age 46)
- Origin: Princeton, New Jersey, U.S.
- Genres: Emo; indie rock; power pop; pop-punk
- Occupations: Musician; singer; songwriter; composer
- Instruments: Vocals; guitar; bass
- Years active: 1994–present
- Labels: Equal Vision; DreamWorks; Vagrant
- Member of: Saves the Day; Two Tongues

Christopher Lane Conley (born February 29, 1980) is an American musician who is the lead-singer-songwriter and rhythm guitarist of the rock band Saves the Day. He is the only remaining original member as well as major artistic contributor.

== Background ==
Conley formed a band with a group of classmates at Princeton Day School. The band was originally titled Indifference, but later renamed Sefler. Conley has cited some of his early influences as the Smiths, Led Zeppelin, Billy Joel, Superchunk, the Smashing Pumpkins, Sunny Day Real Estate, Archers of Loaf, Screeching Weasel, Jawbreaker, Gorilla Biscuits and Lifetime.

Sefler was originally composed of Conley, Bryan Newman, Chris Zampella and Justin Gaylord. They recorded a 3-track 7" entitled "13 Hours of Everything" one afternoon in a friend's basement. They then recorded a nine-track demo at Trax East Studio in New Jersey. While recording, a friend of the band (and later bassist), Sean McGrath, suggested that they change their name to Saves the Day, which they did.

== Career ==
=== Saves the Day ===
Saves the Day signed to Equal Vision Records and recorded their first album Can't Slow Down, which was released in 1998 during their first US tour alongside bands Bane and Countervail. Lyrically the album included idealistic dreams, feeling inadequate, honesty and unhappiness, which reflected Conley's life at the time. The style of music is often considered very similar to that of the band Lifetime.

In 1999, the band released their second album Through Being Cool. With this album, Conley's lyrics started becoming morbid and corporeal, and the style of music changed into a more pop punk sound. Aged 19 and 20, he started listening to the Beatles and has cited them as the main influence for In Reverie.

During the writing of Sound the Alarm, Conley was heavily influenced by Bad Brains, The Damned, The Misfits and The Stooges. Conley, with Saves the Day, has released four other albums. Lyrically, all are considered similar except for In Reverie, which is a more positive album. Conley cites a lack of turmoil in his life at the time as the cause of the change in tone. He commented in Rolling Stone magazine that Saves the Day's release Sound the Alarm, is "about the black clouds inside my mind; It was these intense fears and paranoia and diluted thoughts that were eating me alive. It was utter insanity." in regards to the failure of In Reverie and subsequent release from DreamWorks.

=== Solo touring ===
While there are no plans for any solo recordings, Conley and David Soloway have toured throughout the US, playing acoustic versions of Saves the Day songs. Conley, and an army of committed fans recently have posted performances via the band's website, the band's official YouTube account and elsewhere on the YouTube site. Conley also finished up a solo three week acoustic tour with Matt Pryor of The Get Up Kids. Beginning in 2009, Conley joined fellow front men Dustin Kensrue of Thrice, Matt Pryor and Anthony Raneri from the band Bayside to form the Where's The Band? tour, where each play acoustic renditions of fan favorites. On December 1, 2010, Conley announced he would be opening as a solo act for Dashboard Confessional, on the West Coast end of the "swiss army romance tour" In January. This is Following his East Coast touring on the "Where's the band? Tour" in December.

=== Razia's Shadow ===
In 2008, Conley lent his voice to Forgive Durden's musical project Razia's Shadow: A Musical as the character "Toba The Tura".

=== Two Tongues ===
Two Tongues is a collaborative project between Conley, former Saves the Day guitarist David Soloway, Max Bemis and Coby Linder of Say Anything. Their debut album hit shelves February 3, 2009.

In Fall of 2010, Two Tongues made their first performances as a surprise in the middle of Say Anything's set each night of the Motion City Soundtrack, Say Anything, and Saves the Day tour. They performed the song "Crawl". Arun bali (current guitarist of Saves the Day) played guitar, Kenny Vasoli (of The Starting Line, and Person L) played bass, Jake Turner (of Say Anything) played guitar as well, Coby Linder played drums, while Chris Conley, and Max Bemis sang.

=== Work as a producer ===
Conley worked with The Promise Hero to record a demo at his home studio "The Electric Ladybug". Conley has also co-produced albums such as Dr Manhattan's album Jam Dreams.

=== Sexual misconduct allegations ===
In May 2021, Conley was accused of sexual misconduct and grooming by a young male fan of his. Among the allegations included claims that Conley sent unsolicited nude photographs and manipulated his fandom to lure him into a relationship. Conley admitted to "making an unacceptable number of inappropriate missteps causing irreversible harm" and said "I am truly ashamed and embarrassed by my abhorrent behavior." Equal Vision Records, which released the band's first two and latter two albums, stated "We are working diligently to uncover the truth behind what happened and our actions moving forward will reflect what we are able to find."

== Select discography (Conley as primary composer) ==
- Can't Slow Down (1998) on Equal Vision Records
- I'm Sorry I'm Leaving EP (1998) on Immigrant Sun Records
- Through Being Cool (1999) on Equal Vision Records
- Stay What You Are (2001) on Vagrant Records
- In Reverie (2003) on DreamWorks Records
- Ups and Downs: Early Recordings and B-Sides (2004)
- Bug Sessions Volume One (tour exclusive) (2006)
- Sound the Alarm (2006) on Vagrant Records
- Under the Boards (2007) on Vagrant Records
- Bug Sessions Volume Two and Three (2008)
- Daybreak (2011) on Razor & Tie
- Saves the Day (2013) on Equal Vision
- 9 (2018) on Equal Vision

== Compilations featuring Conley's compositions ==
- West Coast Hardcore vs. East Coast Hardcore on Black Cat Recordings (1998) (features "The Choke")
- The Rebirth Of Hardcore:1999 on Supersoul Records, Good Life Recordings, Temperance Records (1999) (features "The Art of Misplacing Firearms")
- Punk Uprisings: Incompatible, Vol. 2 (1999) (features "Shoulder to the Wheel")
- City Rockers: A Tribute to the Clash (1999) (features cover of Clash' "Clash City Rockers")
- Equal Visions Records Sampler (2000) (features "Always Ten Feet Tall")
- Vagrant Records: Summer Sampler (2000) (features "Holly Hox, Forget Me Nots")
- Another Year on the Streets (2000) (features "Sell My Old Clothes, I'm Off to Heaven", "A Drag in D Flat")
- Another Year on the Streets Vol. 2 (2002) (features "Ups and Downs", "Nightingale")
- Welcome To Vagrant Records (2003) (features "At Your Funeral")
- Living Tomorrow Today: A Benefit for Ty Cambra (2003) (features "A Drag in D Flat")
- Another Year on the Streets Vol. 3 (2004) (features "When It Isn't Like It Should Be")
- A Compilation to Beat Cancer (2004) (features "Don't Go Outside")
- Tony Hawk's American Wasteland (2005) (features cover of Dead Boys' "Sonic Reducer")
- Warped Tour 2006 Compilation (2006) (features "The End")
- Dad Feels (2021) (features Vocals & Guitar in "Melt")
