= Daybreak (Saves the Day album) =

Studio album by Saves the Day
- Released: September 13, 2011
- Recorded: 2009, April 2010
- Genres: Alternative rock, punk rock, emo
- Length: 40:34
- Label: Razor & Tie
- Producers: Saves the Day, Marc Hudson

Saves the Day chronology
Bug Sessions (2009)	Daybreak (2011)	Saves the Day (2013)

Daybreak is the seventh studio album by the American rock band Saves the Day. This album is the band's first without long-time guitarist David Soloway since 1998, and their first with guitarist Arun Bali and bass guitarist Rodrigo Palma. The album also features Spencer Peterson on drums for the first time, before leaving the band prior to the album's release.

== Background ==
When pre-orders were posted for Under the Boards in 2007, listings mentioned that Saves the Day would be releasing an album in 2008 dubbed Daybreak. In late 2007, vocalist/guitarist Chris Conley and guitarist David Soloway worked with Say Anything vocalist Max Bemis and drummer Coby Linder for the side project Two Tongues. On April 11, 2008, it was revealed that Daybreak would be released around the Christmas period. The group worked on Daybreak in mid-2008. A video of the band playing a new track titled "Daybreak" was posted online on October 29. In November, alongside the announcement of Two Tongues' debut album, it was revealed that Daybreak would be released at some point in 2009 through independent label Vagrant Records.

In February and March 2009, the band toured Australia as part of the Soundwave festival with guitarist Thomas Hunter of Forgive Durden. On February 27, it was reported that Soloway had left the band. Soloway said he decided that it was time for him to leave the group, something he called "one of the most difficult decisions I've ever had to make." On April 13, it was announced that Arun Bali had joined the band as their new guitarist. Bali was asked by long-time friend drummer Durijah Lang if he would play with the band for their upcoming tour. After bonding with Conley over their mutual interest in the Beatles and Big Star, Bali was invited to join the band full-time. Shortly afterwards, the band went on tour with Alkaline Trio, which ended in mid-May.

== Recording and composition ==
Following the conclusion of the Alkaline Trio tour, the group entered the studio. Pre-production started in late May. In August, they were tracking guitars and vocals. By September, the group were listening to rough mixes of the album. On December 20, it was announced that bassist Manuel Carrero and Lang had left the band to join Glassjaw. They were replaced by Rodrigo Palma and Spencer Peterson, on bass and drums respectively. Bali had been friends with Palma since school and had appeared in bands with him previously. The group knew Peterson through a mutual friend. Following a support slot for New Found Glory in early 2010, the band entered the studio on April 1. The group announced they were tracking drums on April 13. The album was mixed in September.

Daybreak is the third album of a trilogy, preceded by Sound the Alarm (2006) and Under the Boards (2007). Conley said that Sound the Alarm was "an expression of discontent. Under the Boards is reflection and remorse. Daybreak is acceptance". Conley also said that the three-album concept was "just a bit of a therapeutic experiment. I felt like all twisted up and broken inside and just angry and confused and depressed and sad and I couldn’t really deal with the world or myself. So I was just like this has got to end, I have to at least try and get a grip on the world and on myself. So I dove into the depths of my mind and brought out what I was finding ... Daybreak is coming to terms with everything and trying to understand why I actually got that way and learning to accept it by exploring what it is and why it was there and simultaneously trying to grow through it and be a better person, not purely full of anger". Conley compared "Chameleon" to the "trippier aspects" of In Reverie (2003).

== Release ==
Professional ratings
Aggregate scores
Source	Rating
Metacritic	60/100
Review scores
Source	Rating
AbsolutePunk	8.0/10
AllMusic	3.5/5 stars
Alternative Press	80/100
The Boston Phoenix	1/5 stars
Consequence of Sound	D
Melodic	3.5/5 stars
PopMatters	5/10 stars
Punknews.org	3.5/5 stars
Rock Sound	7/10

On September 11, 2010, it was announced that Claudio Rivera was drumming for the band. A day later, Bali said that Daybreak would not be released in 2010. In late September and early October, the band played a few headlining shows. Following this, the band supported Motion City Soundtrack and Say Anything on their co-headlining US tour. On November 23, the group posted an acoustic version of "Let It All Go" as a free download through their Facebook profile. On January 19, 2011, Conley revealed that the album would be released in the spring/summer time. On January 24, "1984" was posted online. On March 7, it was announced that the band had signed to independent label Razor & Tie. On May 31, Daybreak was announced for release. On the same day, the band released the first single from the album, "Living Without Love". A day later, the track was released as a free download from the group's website.

On June 6, the album's artwork was revealed and a new song was made available, "Undress Me". In June, the band went on a co-headlining US tour with the Get Up Kids. On July 9, the band filmed a music video for "Deranged & Desperate". Daybreak was released through Razor & Tie on September 13. The iTunes edition featured two bonus tracks and a making-of documentary, while the f.y.e. edition featured an acoustic version of the album in its entirety. In October and November, the band went on a co-headlining US tour with Bayside, with support from I Am the Avalanche and Transit. To coincide with the tour, the four groups each contributed one track to a four-way split single. Saves the Day's contribution was an acoustic cover of "Jinx Removing" by Jawbreaker. In November and December, the band performed a few co-headlining shows with Yellowcard in the UK. In August 2012, the band went on a tour of the UK.

== Track listing ==
All lyrics written by Christopher Conley, all songs written by Saves the Day.

1. "Daybreak" – 10:46
  I. "Somehow You Love Me"
  II. "Fucked Up Past the Point of Fixing"
  III. "8 AM"
  IV. "Zig Zag"
  V. "Daybreak"
2. "Let It All Go" – 2:46
3. "1984" – 3:07
4. "E" – 3:03
5. "Z" – 2:55
6. "Deranged & Desperate" – 2:25
7. "Chameleon" – 3:23
8. "Living Without Love" – 1:58
9. "U" – 2:39
10. "O" – 2:37
11. "Undress Me" – 4:55

Bonus tracks

iTunes bonus tracks
No.	Title	Length
12.	"Stay" (electric version; original version appears on Under the Boards (2007))	3:38
13.	"Hold" (electric version; original version appears on I'm Sorry I'm Leaving (1999))	2:38
Total length:		46:50

CD bonus tracks
No.	Title	Length
12.	"Daybreak (Acoustic)"
13.	"Let It All Go (Acoustic)"
14.	"1984 (Acoustic)"
15.	"E (Acoustic)"
16.	"Z (Acoustic)"
17.	"Deranged & Desperate (Acoustic)"
18.	"Chameleon (Acoustic)"
19.	"Living Without Love (Acoustic)"
20.	"U (Acoustic)"
21.	"O (Acoustic)"
22.	"Undress Me (Acoustic)"

== Personnel ==
- Chris Conley - lead vocals, rhythm guitar
- Arun Bali - lead guitar, backing vocals
- Rodrigo Palma - bass guitar
- Spencer Peterson - drums

== Charts ==
Chart performance for Daybreak
Chart (2011)	Peak position
US Billboard 200	100
US Independent Albums (Billboard)	22
US Indie Store Album Sales (Billboard)	21
US Top Alternative Albums (Billboard)	17
US Top Rock Albums (Billboard)	29
