= Sound the Alarm (Saves the Day album) =

Studio album by Saves the Day
- Released: April 11, 2006
- Recorded: August–October 2005
- Studio: Electric Ladybug Studios
- Genres: Emo; pop-punk; power pop
- Length: 35:11
- Label: Vagrant
- Producer: Steve Evetts

Saves the Day chronology
Ups & Downs: Early Recordings and B-Sides (2004)	Sound the Alarm (2006)	Under the Boards (2007)

Sound the Alarm is the fifth studio album by American rock band Saves the Day. After signing to major label DreamWorks Records, the band released In Reverie in late 2003. Shortly afterwards DreamWorks Records was absorbed by Interscope Records, resulting in the band being dropped from the label. After completing some songs in early 2005, the band was aiming to record in May, hoping to release the album in the fall. Pre-production took place in early August with recording being done at the band's own studio, Electric Ladybug Studios with Steve Evetts as the producer. After recording wrapped up in October, the band immediately undertook a 47-date US tour. Sound the Alarm, along with the later records Under the Boards (2007) and Daybreak (2011) form a trilogy whose theme is self-discovery.

In January 2006, the band re-signed with independent label Vagrant Records. After touring with Circa Survive and Moneen in spring 2006, Sound the Alarm was released in April. The album's release was preceded by the two songs—"The End" and "Shattered" —being made available for streaming. Sound the Alarm has received generally favorable reviews with a number of reviewers commenting on Conley's vocals. The album peaked at number 67 on the Billboard 200 chart and number four on the Independent Albums chart. Saves the Day performed as part of Warped Tour 2006. The band embarked on a brief east coast tour with Pistolita in September, followed by a co-headlining tour with Say Anything in spring 2007.

== Background ==
In 2003, Saves the Day signed to major label DreamWorks Records and released In Reverie in September of that year. Frontman Chris Conley received a call from the band's A&R person at the label: "[H]e said, 'None of the programmers at radio are biting at the single, and MTV doesn't want to play the video, so we're going to have to start thinking about the next record.' I had a total breakdown. I was like, 'How is this possible? The album just came out!'" A few weeks after the album's release, DreamWorks Records was absorbed by Interscope Records and not long after, the band was dropped from the label. Using all the money they had, the group decided to build their own studio. Conley explained, "if we have a place to make cheap records, we can keep the band going for years".

Before they began working on new material, Conley was having doubts about himself. "[I] completely lost faith in myself" after the lack of success with In Reverie, "when that happened, a chamber got opened up inside me, a vault of seething despair". Sometime after, Conley locked himself in a room, forcing himself to write new material. He explained that "all of a sudden, the shit storm came. And there was plenty of material -- just frustration and rage and desperation, just the fear of losing everything". Following the completion of new songs in February 2005, the group planned to start recording in May, with a projected fall release date for the new album. Prior to the recording sessions, bassist Eben D'Amico was replaced by Glassjaw bassist Manuel Carrero. Conley said he told D'Amico that he was being kicked out of the band, which was a collective decision, as D'Amico wasn't "on the same wavelength anymore" while in the writing stages for a new album.

== Recording ==
On August 4, 2005, the band began pre-production, and the following day were "in full swing, blazing through songs in rehearsal" in preparation for recording. By this point, the group had 18 songs, and aimed to record 14 of them. The band called this material "short and fast and angry," citing several songs they were working on: "Head for the Hills," "Sound the Alarm," "Diseased" and "Eulogy". The recording sessions for Sound the Alarm were self-funded by the band, which Conley described as having "stretched us, for sure". He said the band considered themselves "lucky enough to have enough capital" to start recording, which took place at their personal studio, Electric Ladybug Studios. Producer duties were handled by Steve Evetts, who produced the group's first two albums, Can't Slow Down (1998) and Through Being Cool (1999).

According to Conley, the band worked with Evetts again as he could "see what your qualities are and bring out the best in you". They attempted to get Rob Schnapf, who produced Stay What You Are (2001) and In Reverie, but were unable to due to scheduling issues. Evetts also engineered the recordings, with assistance from Jesse Cannon during drum tracking. On August 28, 2005, the band posted a recording update on their website. In the post, Conley mentioned the band had worked on a song titled "Sticky 500" the day before, and were proceeding to work on "Say You'll Never Leave". He revealed that he had done "some rough vocals" takes and noted that recording was "moving along pretty quickly now". The band announced they had finished recording on October 19. The album was mixed by Chad Blinman at The Eye Socket and mastered by Dave Collins at Dave Collins Mastering.

== Composition ==
Sound the Alarm is the first album in a trilogy with the theme of self-discovery. It was followed by Under the Boards (2007) and Daybreak (2011). Conley said that Sound the Alarm was "an expression of discontent. Under the Boards is reflection and remorse. Daybreak is acceptance." All the album's songs were written by the band, with Conley providing lyrics. According to Conley, Sound the Alarm details the "furious truth of my aching heart, my tumultuous emotional landscape, and my fractured psyche. Knowing that I needed to turn myself around after nearly destroying myself and my relationships with my strained emotional existence". Describing the album's theme, Conley said it was "desolation, like you're the last person standing after the apocalypse and you're alone and you're cold. Your home has been obliterated, but you have to keep on trucking through those feelings of isolation and desolation and keep hope alive in the midst of insanity."

The album's sound has been described as emo, pop, pop-punk and power pop, being referred to a mature iteration one of their earlier albums, Through Being Cool (1999). It drew overall comparisons to Hawthorne Heights, Hey Mercedes, Matchbook Romance, Dead Boys and 7 Seconds, with the guitar work recalling the Stooges and the Pixies. On the album's sound, Conley revealed that the group purposefully "kept it simple," relying solely on two guitars, bass and drums, attempting to create "a raw album" in the process. Conley's vocals were reminiscent of Our Lady Peace frontman Raine Maida with sneer in the vein of Sid Vicious. The lyrics make reference to cutting off limps, ripping out tongues and lungs, guns and hangings, among other things.

Conley described the opening track "Head for the Hills" as being "thoughts that creep up and swallow you, and you can't ignore the negative, the hell inside". It set the template for the remainder of the album in its mood, tempo and thick bass sound, coming across as a combination of Bad Brains and the Stooges. "The End", along with "Say You'll Never Leave", channeled the band's earlier punk rock roots with its short length and fast pace. "Shattered" and "Delusional" were initially intended to appear on In Reverie; both were rewritten for inclusion on Sound the Alarm. The Pennywise-indebted "Dying Day" and "Delusional" evoked the likes of "Nightingale" and "Cars and Calories", both tracks from Stay What You Are. "34" is an emo track where the guitars add emphasis to every word during the chorus sections. Conley said "'Don't Know Why [is] my blues. It's one of those songs that keeps me off the ledge personally. I sing it to myself all the time when I'm at home alone." The closing track "Hell Is Here" opened with a 1970s-style hard rock guitar intro that recalled Wolfmother.

== Release ==
Immediately after finishing recording, the band went on a 47-date tour with Senses Fail, The Early November, and Say Anything, lasting from October until December 2005. On January 8, 2006, the band formally announced that Carrero was a member of the group, and on January 30, they announced that they had re-signed with independent label Vagrant Records. The label had previously released the band's Stay What You Are (2001) and Ups & Downs: Early Recordings and B-Sides (2004) albums. Label boss Rich Egan stated that the band "helped put Vagrant on the map" and that the label was "ecstatic to have them back". Conley said that as the label was almost half-controlled by Interscope, it would've been seen as "a kick in the ass" to them as they "have to work with us again". On February 13, the track listing and artwork for Sound the Alarm, which was designed by Soloway, were revealed.

In March and April, the band toured the US with support from Circa Survive and Moneen. On March 23, "The End" and "Shattered" were made available for streaming. This was followed by a second leg of the tour with Circa Survive and Moneen, running into April and May. Sound the Alarm was initially planned for release on April 4, before being released on April 11 through Vagrant Records. A music video was released for "The End". The band appeared on Warped Tour 2006, performing two sets: one on the main stage and an acoustic set on the Vagrant stage. In September, the band went on a brief east coast tour with support from Pistolita. Though I Am the Avalanche was initially on the trek, they were unable to make the shows as they were in Japan at the time. In November, Conley performed a few solo shows across the east coast. In March 2007, Parada left the group and was replaced by Classic Case/Glassjaw drummer Durijah Lang. In April and May, the band went on a co-headlining tour with Say Anything.

== Reception ==
Professional ratings
Aggregate scores
Source	Rating
Metacritic	64/100
Review scores
Source	Rating
AllMusic	3.5/5 stars
Alternative Press	4/5 stars
Entertainment Weekly	B
Gigwise	7/10 stars
IGN	5.4/10
Iowa State Daily	3/5
The Morning Call	Unfavorable
Now	3/5
Ox-Fanzine	7/10
PopMatters	3/10 stars

Sound the Alarm reached number 67 on the Billboard 200 chart and number four on the Independent Albums chart. According to review aggregator Metacritic, the album received generally favourable reviews.

The music of Sound the Alarm divided reviewers, with some praising it, while others were unimpressed. AllMusic reviewer Corey Apar viewed the album as a return to the "aggressive pop-punk nature" of Through Being Cool, "but ya know, five years more mature". Entertainment Weekly reviewer Leah Greenblatt considered the album is "as turgidly epic as the tenets of the genre demand" with the band having seemingly "rediscovered their riff-heavy melodics" to sit alongside "impressively righteous indignation". Gigwise staff member David Renshaw regarded the instrumentation as being "nothing spectacular," while noting that there were "riffs piled on top of riffs ... and a few funky basslines".

IGN reviewer Chad Grischow maintained that the music "comes across [as] toothless", lacking "any originality," and was "too repetitive and predictable". Evan Davies of Now observed that the album sounded like the group were "going through an identity crisis". In a review for the Iowa State Daily, Tyler Barrett held a similar viewpoint, commenting that the band sounding as if they were "clearly caught in a web of aspirations, all at once attempting to evolve musically while sticking to its roots". PopMatters reviewer Dan Raper asserted that the songs, "for all their bluster, hardly make any impression at all. ... Saves the Day have given their fans nothing exciting, innovative, or new."

Reaction to Conley's voice was mixed with some reviewers commenting on its whininess; his lyrics received equally mixed responses. Apar noted Conley's vocals as walking "that fine line between endearing and annoying" and likened them to Raine Maida of Our Lady Peace crossed with Sid Vicious of the Sex Pistols. Davies said Conley "has toned down his once enraging nasal whine and sounds unusually aggressive". Grischow, however, stated that Conley "whines his way through the entire album, sounding as though he is on his knees begging for something". In a review for Alternative Press, Scott Heisel reckoned Conley "seem[ed] to take pride in wearing his heart not just on his lyrical sleeve, but on any organ you’d care to eviscerate". John J. Moser of The Morning Call considered the lyrics were "as dark and violent" as possible, and suggested they would "repuls[e] listeners instead of having them relate." Renshaw, on the other hand, said "the thing that keeps you coming back to this album is the lyrics".

== Track listing ==
All songs written by Saves the Day. All lyrics written by Chris Conley.

1. "Head for the Hills" – 2:50
2. "The End" – 1:54
3. "Shattered" – 3:08
4. "Eulogy" – 3:22
5. "Dying Day" – 2:21
6. "34" – 2:22
7. "Say You'll Never Leave" – 2:20
8. "Diseased" – 2:12
9. "Don't Know Why" – 3:22
10. "Sound the Alarm" – 3:06
11. "Bones" – 2:23
12. "Delusional" – 2:07
13. "Hell Is Here" – 3:36

== Personnel ==
Personnel per booklet.

Saves the Day

- Christopher Conley – vocals, guitar
- David Soloway – guitar
- Pete Parada – drums
- Manuel Ragoonanan Carrero – bass

Production

- Steve Evetts – producer, engineer
- Chad Blinman – mixing
- Jesse Cannon – assistant engineer during drum tracking
- Chris Fusco – guitar tech
- Dave Collins – mastering
- David Soloway – art design
- Ben Goetting – layout
- Louise Sturges – photography

== Charts ==
Chart performance for Sound the Alarm
Chart (2006)	Peak position
US Billboard 200	27
US Independent Albums (Billboard)	4
US Indie Store Album Sales (Billboard)	10
US Top Rock Albums (Billboard)	20
