= Piglet (band) =

American instrumental math rock band

- Origin: Chicago, Illinois, United States
- Genres: Math rock, instrumental rock
- Years active: 2003—2007
- Labels: Arborvitae Records, Dog & Pony Records
- Past members: Asher Weisberg; Ezra Sandzer-Bell; Matthew Parrish

Piglet was an American instrumental math rock band, formed in Chicago, Illinois in 2003 by former members of Seyarse.

== Background ==
The band broke up after releasing their debut EP, Lava Land, on the label Team AV, in 2005. In April 2020, Lava Land was ranked #4 in a readers poll published by Fecking Bahamas of the 50 greatest math rock albums of all time.

Due to popular demand, the band ran a Kick Starter campaign in 2013 to release Lava Land on vinyl. The LP is limited to a pressing of 1,000 copies, (900 on purple vinyl and a limited run of 100 on clear vinyl). The campaign was such a success, Piglet were able to also package and release a CDEP called "Songs" which contains live multi-track recordings of all of the band's post-"Lava Land" material. Recorded live at the Beat Kitchen in Chicago, "Songs", is limited to 500 copies with artwork and hand printed packaging by Kyle Maj.

Bassist Ezra Sandzer-Bell went on to publish two books on esoteric music theory in 2014/15. During that period, he released a downtempo retro gaming concept album titled Materia Musica. These were followed by collaborations with Ben Rosett in 2019 and 2020. At the start of 2021, Ezra launched a music software company called AudioCipher that helps producers generate new melodic ideas by turning words into MIDI notes.

In January 2023, after several years of musical inactivity, Matthew Parrish formed the band Denude with members of Murder in the Red Barn, Credentials, and Fuiguirnet, as well as the Dog & Pony Records label.

== Musical style ==
Piglet's music has been categorized as math rock, indie rock, post rock, experimental rock, and instrumental rock. The group's compositions mainly employed clean, melodic, and highly technical guitarwork with consonant hooks, complimented by similarly technically demanding drumming.

== Members ==
- Asher Weisberg - guitar
- Ezra Sandzer-Bell - bass
- Matthew Parrish - drums, percussion

== Discography ==
- Lava Land EP (Team AV, 2005)
- early songs EP (2013)
- Songs EP (2014)
