= Ups & Downs: Early Recordings and B-Sides =

Compilation album by Saves the Day
- Released: August 24, 2004
- Recorded: 1997–2004
- Length: 43:56
- Label: Vagrant

Saves the Day chronology
In Reverie (2003)	Ups & Downs: Early Recordings and B-Sides (2004)	Sound the Alarm (2006)

Professional ratings
Review scores
Source	Rating
AllMusic	4/5 stars
Exclaim!	Favorable
Ox-Fanzine	5/10

Ups & Downs: Early Recordings and B-Sides is a B-Side compilation album by Saves the Day, released on Vagrant Records on August 24, 2004.

As the title suggests, it is a compilation of early recordings and B-sides, recorded between 1997 when they were known as Sefler to the live reworking of "Jessie & My Whetstone" in 2003. The compilation also includes the entire I'm Sorry I'm Leaving, remastered and without the Modern English cover, "I Melt with You", as well as for the first time on CD, the EP's vinyl-only track "The Way His Collar Falls".

== Track listing ==
All lyrics written by Christopher Conley, all songs written by Saves the Day.

1. "Ups & Downs" – 3:18 (a B-side track from Stay What You Are (2001))
2. "Sell My Old Clothes, I'm Off to Heaven" – 3:24 (from Another Year on the Streets, a various artist compilation album. (2000))
3. "A Drag in D Flat" – 2:38 (from Another Year on the Streets, a various artist compilation album.)
4. "I'm Sorry I'm Leaving" – 2:47 (from I'm Sorry I'm Leaving (1999))
5. "Hold" – 2:22 (from I'm Sorry I'm Leaving)
6. "Jessie & My Whetstone" – 2:05 (from I'm Sorry I'm Leaving)
7. "Take Our Cars Now!" – 2:36 (from I'm Sorry I'm Leaving)
8. "The Way His Collar Falls" – 2:46 (from I'm Sorry I'm Leaving)
9. "The Art of Misplacing Firearms" – 2:09 (from Rebirth of Hardcore: 1999, a various artist compilation album.)
10. "East Coast" – 1:36 (from Saves the Day's demo)
11. "1:19" – 1:38 (from Saves the Day's demo)
12. "An Afternoon Laughing" – 2:00 (from Saves the Day's demo)
13. "Dave Feels Right" – 2:26 (from Saves the Day's demo)
14. "When It Isn't Like It Should Be" – 1:49 (from Saves the Day's demo)
15. "1959" – 0:34 (previously unreleased song from the demo sessions)
16. "I Think I'll Quit" – 2:14 (mistitled as "Kentucky Parallel Parking" on the album's first pressing. The song was recorded by Chris Conley's previous band, Sefler.)
17. "Cheer" – 2:39 (Descendents cover, previously unreleased)
18. "Clash City Rockers" – 2:14 (The Clash cover, from City Rockers: A Tribute to The Clash (1999))
19. "Jessie & My Whetstone" – 2:32 (live 2003)

== Charts ==
Chart performance for Ups & Downs
Chart (2004)	Peak position
US Billboard 200	160
US Independent Albums (Billboard)	16
