= For the Lonely Lest the Wiser =

Extended play by Dr Manhattan

EP by Dr Manhattan
- Released: December 31, 2005
- Recorded: Daniel Goode's House, Chicago, Illinois
- Genres: Indie Rock; Alternative; Post-hardcore; Electronica
- Length: 18:18
- Producers: Daniel Good; Dr Manhattan

Dr Manhattan chronology
For the Lonely Lest the Wiser (2005)	Are You Bald? EP (2007)

For the Lonely Lest the Wiser is the debut EP from Wauconda, Illinois rock outfit Dr Manhattan. The EP was released on December 31, 2005. The track The Party's Opinion is the first song the band wrote together.

== Track listing ==
No.	Title	Length
1.	"Minds Like Ours"	3:42
2.	"The Party's Opinion"	2:28
3.	"To Feel Cozy Surrounded By Wolves"	3:21
4.	"Who's Going To Pay For The Door?"	2:16
5.	"Dirty, Scandalous, Dirty"	3:28
6.	"Breath Of An Epoch"	3:05
