= 9 (Saves the Day album) =

Studio album by Saves the Day
- Released: October 26, 2018
- Length: 44:35
- Label: Equal Vision

Saves the Day chronology
| Saves the Day (2013) | 9 (2018) |

Singles from 9
- 1. "Rendezvous" Released: August 14, 2018

Professional ratings
Aggregate scores
| Source | Rating |
|---|---|
| Metacritic | 49/100 |
Review scores
| Source | Rating |
| Exclaim! | 3/10 |
| No Ripcord | 7/10 |
| Pitchfork | 3.5/10 |

9 is the ninth studio album by American rock band Saves the Day. It was released on October 26, 2018, through Equal Vision Records.

== Release ==
On August 14, 2018, 9 was announced for release in October. In addition, "Rendezvous" was made available for streaming, and the album's track listing was revealed. On September 26, "Kerouac & Cassady" was made available for streaming. On October 16, a music video was released for "Side by Side", directed by Robyn August. 9 was released on October 26 through Equal Vision Records. The following month, the group embarked on a US headlining tour with support from Kevin Devine and An Horse. In February and March 2019, they went on another headlining US tour, with support from Remo Drive and Mighty. In August, they went on a co-headlining US tour with Joyce Manor with support from Awakebutstillinbed.

== Critical reception ==
9 was met with mixed or average reviews from critics. At Metacritic, which assigns a weighted average rating out of 100 to reviews from mainstream publications, this release received an average score of 49, based on 4 reviews.

== Track listing ==
| No. | Title | Length |
|---|---|---|
| 1. | "Saves the Day" | 2:34 |
| 2. | "Suzuki" | 1:18 |
| 3. | "Side by Side" | 3:12 |
| 4. | "Kerouac & Cassady" | 3:43 |
| 5. | "It’s Such a Beautiful World" | 2:11 |
| 6. | "Rosé" | 3:39 |
| 7. | "1997" | 2:47 |
| 8. | "Rendezvous" | 3:37 |
| 9. | "29": I. "Heartbeat"; II. "So in Love"; III. "432"; IV. "Tangerine"; V. "Victorian & 21st"; VI. "Angel"; VII. "New Jersey" | 21:31 |
| Total length: | | 44:35 |

== Charts ==
| Chart | Peak position |
|---|---|
| US Independent Albums (Billboard) | 16 |
| US Top Album Sales (Billboard) | 96 |
| US Vinyl Albums (Billboard) | 23 |
