= Saves the Day (album) =

Studio album by Saves the Day
- Released: September 17, 2013
- Recorded: February–March 2013
- Studios: Rancho Recordo, Michigan
- Genres: Emo pop; pop punk
- Length: 32:11
- Labels: Equal Vision; Rory
- Producers: Saves the Day; Marc Hudson; Rob Schnapf

Saves the Day chronology
Daybreak (2011)	Saves the Day (2013)	9 (2018)

Saves the Day is the eighth studio album released by rock band Saves the Day. It was released September 17, 2013 on Rory Records, an imprint of Equal Vision Records, created by Say Anything frontman Max Bemis. The album was well received from music critics, praising the energy, diversity, and change in tone, although opinion was more divided than previous releases from fans.

This is the band's first album for Equal Vision Records since 1999's Through Being Cool.

== Background and production ==
In a December 2011 interview, Chris Conley revealed that an eighth Saves the Day album was in the works and he was hoping that the band would return to the studio in the fall of 2012 to record it. On the November 23, 2012, the band posted a demo, as well as a website for their fans who wish to fund the making of their next album. On January 11, 2013, it was revealed that the band's PledgeMusic profile mentioned that their next album would be released in 172 days' time, roughly on July 2, 2013. The band began working on their next album at Rancho Recordo studio in Michigan in February. On March 18, the band announced they were almost finished with the new album. A month later, on April 17, the band finished recording their new album. On May 1, it was mentioned that the new album was currently in the mixing stage.

== Release ==
On May 20, 2013, it was announced that drummer Dennis Wilson, formerly of Every Avenue, had joined the band. Three days later, the album's track listing was revealed. On June 17, the band posted a new song, entitled "Remember". The band planned to independently release their next album with the aid of PledgeMusic. On July 1, the band's PledgeMusic account displayed "91 days until release." Later in the month, on July 29, it was announced that the album would be self-titled, its artwork was revealed, and that it would be released by independent label Equal Vision Records and its imprint Rory Records. Conley said that re-signing with Equal Vision Records, who had released the band's first two albums, "feels like coming home."

On August 20, "The Tide of Our Times" was made available for streaming. On August 28, a lyric video was released for "Ring Pop". Saves the Day was made available for streaming on September 13, and released on September 17. In September and October, the band went on a headlining US tour with support from Into It. Over It. and Hostage Calm. In December, the band went on an acoustic tour with support from Jon Simmons of Balance and Composure and Walter Schreifels. A music video was released for "In the In Between" April 8, 2014, directed by Sean Stout. The album was released in the UK through Easy Life and Sony Red in May while the band was supporting Brand New on their tour of the UK.

== Critical reception ==
Professional ratings
Aggregate scores
Source	Rating
Metacritic	(82/100)
Review scores
Source	Rating
AbsolutePunk	8/10
AllMusic	3.5/5 stars
Alternative Press	4.5/5 stars
Consequence of Sound	C+
Punknews.org	4/5 stars

Saves the Day received universal acclaim from music critics. According to review aggregator website Metacritic, the album has an average critic review score of 82/100, based on 5 reviews indicating "universal acclaim".

Gregory Heaney of AllMusic complimented the album with three and half stars out of five, saying, " While it's no shock that the bandmembers had an album like this in them after all this time, Saves the Day's effervescence makes for a pleasant surprise, giving listeners a brief escape from their day into a world filled with poppy hooks and sparkling melody."

At Alternative Press, Brendan Manley told that "On Saves the Day, you can feel how that emotional and thematic weight has been lifted, and Conley & Co. approach this new batch of songs with a palpable joy and rhythmic bounce that make the record glide by like a summer's day." In addition, Manley stated that "If this is what the next stage of Saves the Day's career sounds like, another few albums will be just fine."

== Track listing ==
All lyrics written by Chris Conley, all songs written by Saves the Day.

1. "Remember" – 2:49
2. "In the In Between" – 2:53
3. "Beyond All of Time" – 3:29
4. "Ain't No Kind of Love" – 2:58
5. "Lucky Number" – 2:54
6. "Xenophobic Blind Left Hook" – 3:10
7. "The Tide of Our Times" – 2:25
8. "Supernova" – 3:46
9. "Verona" – 2:23
10. "Ring Pop" – 2:33
11. "Stand in the Stars" – 3:39

== Personnel ==
- Chris Conley – vocals, guitar
- Arun Bali – lead guitar
- Rodrigo Palma – bass
- Claudio Rivera – drums
- Marc Hudson – engineer
- Rob Schnapf – mixer

== Charts ==
Chart performance for Saves the Day
Chart (2013)	Peak position
US Billboard 200	56
US Independent Albums (Billboard)	9
US Top Rock & Alternative Albums (Billboard)	22
