= Through Being Cool =

Studio album by Saves the Day
- Released: November 2, 1999
- Recorded: June 1999
- Studio: Trax East (South River, New Jersey)
- Genres: Pop-punk; emo
- Length: 33:22
- Label: Equal Vision
- Producer: Steve Evetts

Saves the Day chronology
I'm Sorry I'm Leaving (1999)	Through Being Cool (1999)	Stay What You Are (2001)

Through Being Cool is the second studio album by American rock band Saves the Day, released on November 2, 1999, by Equal Vision. The songs on Through Being Cool were written while the band members attended New York University. The album was recorded in 11 days and represented the band's transition from a melodic hardcore sound to a more pop punk style. It was produced by Steve Evetts at Trax East Recording Studio in South River, New Jersey. The band's members dropped out of college to tour alongside Snapcase, New Found Glory, Hot Water Music, and Face to Face, among others. A music video was filmed for the song "Shoulder to the Wheel."

Eventually selling 50,000 copies, the success of Through Being Cool helped Saves the Day to sign with Vagrant Records (though they would later return to Equal Vision with the release of their self-titled album in 2013). It was named one of Alternative Press' 10 most influential albums of 1999. To celebrate the album's 15th anniversary, the band played the album front-to-back on tour and Equal Vision re-pressed the album on vinyl. Vocalist Chris Conley considers it "the most important record that we did."

== Background ==
Saves the Day formed in late 1997. Their debut album, Can't Slow Down, was released through Equal Vision in August 1998. The album helped the band to gain fans, mainly in the New Jersey area. The band promoted the album with two tours helping to expand its fan base. Initially, they were heckled at each appearance. Drummer Bryan Newman said that the group was "totally out of place" among the other bands on the tour. Saves the Day had three different lineup changes while touring in support of Can't Slow Down, leaving vocalist Chris Conley and Newman as the only original members remaining.

Saves the Day's guitarist, Justin Gaylord, had left at the end of their first full tour of the United States. Dave Soloway, who had driven the band to their gigs during high school, was added to the band as Gaylord's replacement. (Note: Gabe Saporta, then a member of Midtown and later of Cobra Starship, was a fan of the band. He had tried out to be the guitar player for Saves the Day, but was unsuccessful.) Conley described Soloway as a kid who "came from bluegrass and his family would sit around singing folk songs and stuff at home." Guitarist Ted Alexander was the band's roadie, and spent so much time with the band that they eventually "just gave him a guitar". Sean McGrath, bassist on the band's first album, was kicked out of the band and the group sought a replacement. Around the time, Saves the Day was playing gigs with local bands, one of which Eben D'Amico was in. Conley called him a "sick" bassist and eventually asked him if he would like to join Saves the Day. With this lineup, the band entered Shoulder to the Wheel studios in March 1999 and recorded an acoustic EP, I'm Sorry I'm Leaving. The EP was released in mid-1999 on Immigrant Sun Records, and only 500 copies were pressed.

== Recording ==
Through Being Cool was recorded with producer Steve Evetts in June 1999 at Trax East Recording Studio in South River, New Jersey. (Note: Evetts had previously produced the band's album Can't Slow Down purely because he had worked earlier with Lifetime – a band that Conley loved. He would later produce and engineer Sound the Alarm (2006).) Evetts always kept the band "in line" and was "definitely the guru of the whole thing", according to Newman. Unfortunately, the experience of recording in a studio nearly led to Newman having a breakdown, as he was not used to the environment; he later noted that the entire process "was intense". Recording and mixing was done over a total of eleven days. The band, attempting to finish the album, pulled all-nighters, relaxing in the control room, and sleeping in the lounge. In an interview with Alternative Press, Conley that while other people might have thought the group was trying to rush through production, he and his band members were actually "just having a blast". The recording sessions also included two additional half-day sessions, which were booked due to Conley losing his voice recording the vocals. Eventually, when it came time to track the album, Conley and the band were "really psyched" at how the songs were sounding. Evetts also engineered the album, while Alan Douches mastered it at West West Side.

== Composition ==
Saves the Day wrote the material for Through Being Cool while attending New York University (NYU). Conley said, "I had written all the songs while at NYU, writing lyrics during Psychology 101 and writing the guitar parts over at Bryan’s apartment on 7th Street and 2nd Avenue." The music was credited to Conley and Saves the Day, except for "Do You Know What I love the Most?" by Alexander and Saves the Day, and "The Vast Spoils of America (From the Badlands Through the Ocean)" by Soloway and Saves the Day. The band rehearsed in Conley's parents' basement and slept over at the home, "working all weekend long." During these sessions, they refined what Conley had written and recorded demos of their progress.

"You listen to the lyrics and it's just like this lonely guy, who was longing for something more. The record has a lot of melancholy, which would play out in the years to come. But the songs are all very exciting, full of life."

— Chris Conley on the album on its 15th anniversary, 2014

The album has a more pop punk sound compared to Can't Slow Down, which was a melodic hardcore-driven record. Allmusic reviewer Vincent Jeffries described the record's sound as "emocore". Conley explained that the shift in sound came from the music he was listening to. He liked several hardcore bands, but had played their albums "to death" and wanted to look for other sources of inspiration. While working on Through Being Cool, Conley listened to the Foo Fighters' The Colour and the Shape (1997), Weezer's Pinkerton (1996), and Joni Mitchell's Blue (1971), among others.

== Artwork ==
At the time, the hardcore world was so anti-rock star. People said, “look at the album cover; you guys are selling out,” because it was this glossy image and we have our faces on there.

— Chris Conley on the cover's reception, 2014

Dan Sandshaw, the head of Equal Vision, said that there was a debate over the artwork for the album. Conley was unsure about what to do with the artwork, and went along with Newman and Soloway's ideas. (Note: Newman and Soloway both went to school for photography.) The cover artwork that was eventually chosen depicts the band as social outcasts, sitting on a couch during a high school party. From left to right on the couch of the album artwork are Ted Alexander, Chris Conley, Eben D'Amico, Bryan Newman, and David Soloway. Eben is shown biting his nails, while Chris stares blankly into space. The album booklet continues the outcast theme. Sandshaw felt that cover would give the wrong impression to hardcore fans, and Newman regretted it after the album was released. Conley said people told the band that they had sold out because the cover art featured their faces. The band, and Luke Hoverman, designed the concept with Frank Davidson providing the layout. The photographs were taken by Hoverman with assistance from Lenny Zimkus. The CD art features Gabe Saporta kissing his college girlfriend, while the back cover has actor James Ransone passed out on a couch.

== Release and touring ==
When the band gave the finished album to Sandshaw, he said that the Equal Vision staff "couldn't stop listening to it" and were determined to get the band "the exposure they deserved." Sandshaw thought it was going to be a game-changing album. Dropping out of college to give the album live exposure, the band built a big fan base along the east coast. (Note: The band was previously able to tour only when they had free time during their first year of college.) In October and November 1999, Saves the Day went on tour with Snapcase and Kid Dynamite. Through Being Cool was released on November 2 on Equal Vision Records. (Note: U.S. Equal Vision EVR054) The band played a release show with The Get Up Kids, At the Drive-In, and Midtown. In January 2000, the band toured alongside Piebald and New Found Glory, and then with Snapcase in late January until early February. Saves the Day also played in February with Hot Water Music. In February, the band filmed the music video for "Shoulder to the Wheel" with director Darren Doan. The video was filmed at Soloway's parents' house and featured the band's friends. The group played songs to get people into the mood before miming along to "Shoulder to the Wheel". The video was released to television stations on April 7. The band was uncomfortable with Doan's ideas during the making of the video, and Newman said the group "hated it as soon as [they] saw it".

The band went on a North American tour in 2000 with H_{2}O between March and May. On this trip, the band got into an accident with their van that almost ended their career. They rejoined the tour on the Seattle date. By the time this run had ended, the album had sold nearly 50,000 copies – a massive number for Equal Vision. In an issue of CMJ New Music Report dated May 2000, it was announced that due to the success of Through Being Cool, (Note: Vagrant had previously called the members of Saves the Day upon the release of Through Being Cool, saying how thrilled they were for the band.) Saves the Day had signed with Vagrant Records. Rich Egan, founder of Vagrant, became their manager. Egan "fell in love" with the band because their lyrics were "so honest, so cut and dried." The band performed on a few Warped Tour dates in early August. Following this, the band played shows with Face to Face, New Found Glory, and Alkaline Trio in late August to early October. They again joined Face to Face from late October to mid November.

== Reception ==
Professional ratings
Review scores
Source	Rating
AllMusic	3/5 stars
Consequence of Sound	Favorable
Exclaim!	Favorable
Metal Hammer	9/10
Ox-Fanzine	Favorable
Punknews.org	3/5 stars

AllMusic reviewer Vincent Jeffries noted that, for Through Being Cool, the band went for a "punchier production," using it to foreground Conley's "romantic teen declarations". According to Jeffries, while some songs may have had issues, such as being too "obvious, sappy, or both, Conley pulls it together with plain-spoken honesty", and highlighted "Third Engine" as an example of this. While noting that their first album sounded like Lifetime, Aubin Paul wrote that the band "found themselves" with Through Being Cool. At the same time, Paul argued that part of the album were derivative, highlighting in particular one song that he felt was "almost identical" to the Samiam song "Capsized". In a retrospective review for Consequence of Sound, Megan Ritt wrote that "Shoulder to the Wheel" and "Rocks Tonic Juice Magic" had not "really aged at all" and sounded as "vital" today as they did when they were first released. Ritt opined that "Banned from the Back Porch" "rock[ed] pretty hard," making listeners want to "thrash a little harder in the mosh pit" while Jeffries noted the song sounded similar to metal.

=== Legacy ===
Alternative Press writer Colin McGuire argued that Through Being Cool influenced a new wave of pop-punk bands, such as Fall Out Boy, My Chemical Romance, and Taking Back Sunday. Alternative Press also included the album on their list of the most influential albums of 1999. Tris McCall of NJ.com cited the album as "every third-wave emo band's inspiration [...] [sending] a shockwave through the pop-punk underground." NME listed the album was one of 20 Pop Punk Albums Which Will Make You Nostalgic. BuzzFeed included it at number 5 on its list of 36 Pop Punk Albums You Need To Hear Before You F——ing Die. The album was included in Rock Sound's 101 Modern Classics list at number 60, with the notation that "pop-punk has not been the same since [1999], and this record play[ed] a major role in that change." Fall Out Boy's vocalist Patrick Stump listed the album at number 10 on his list of 10 Records That Changed My Life. Stump revealed that he would not "have been in Fall Out Boy if it weren't for this record". The album's artwork was included by Fuse.tv as one of 20 Iconic Pop Punk Album Covers. Journalists Leslie Simon and Trevor Kelley included the album in their list of the most essential emo releases in their book Everybody Hurts: An Essential Guide to Emo Culture (2007), while Stereogum listed "Rocks Tonic Juice Magic" as one of 30 Essential Songs From The Golden Era of Emo.

Saves the Day performed the album in its entirety at a secret show in Brooklyn in September 2013. On September 4, 2014, Saves the Day and Say Anything announced a co-headlining U.S. tour with support from Reggie and the Full Effect. On the tour, Saves the Day played Through Being Cool, Say Anything played ...Is a Real Boy (2004), and Reggie and the Full Effect played Under the Tray (2003). The tour lasted from November 14 to December 21. Equal Vision remastered Through Being Cool and repressed the album on vinyl for its 15th anniversary. The idea for the tour came about from a conversation between Conley and Say Anything's frontman Max Bemis. The two were discussing the past and Bemis mentioned that ...Is a Real Boy was going to be 10 years old in the same year Through Being Cool turned 15. In an interview with Alternative Press for the album's 15th anniversary, Conley thought the album had stood up well and that it was "pretty fresh-sounding" and considered it "the most important record that we did".

== Track listing ==
All tracks are written by Chris Conley and Saves the Day, except where noted.

No.	Title	Writer(s)	Length
1.	"All-Star Me"		1:43
2.	"You Vandal"		2:28
3.	"Shoulder to the Wheel"		3:19
4.	"Rocks Tonic Juice Magic"		3:27
5.	"Holly Hox, Forget Me Nots"		2:37
6.	"Third Engine"		3:40
7.	"My Sweet Fracture"		3:52
8.	"The Vast Spoils of America (From the Badlands through the Ocean)"	Dave Soloway, Saves the Day	3:08
9.	"The Last Lie I Told"		2:23
10.	"Do You Know What I Love the Most?"	Ted Alexander, Saves the Day	1:34
11.	"Through Being Cool"		2:04
12.	"Banned from the Back Porch"		2:59

== Personnel ==
Personnel per booklet.

Saves the Day

- Chris Conley – vocals
- Bryan Newman – drums
- Eben D'Amico – bass
- Ted Alexander – rhythm guitar
- David Soloway – lead guitar

Production

- Steve Evetts – producer, engineering
- Alan Douches – mastering
- Saves the Day, Luke Hoverman – design concept
- Frank Davidson – layout
- Luke Hoverman – photography
- Lenny Zimkus – assistant photography
- Megan Delany – styling
