= Saves the Day =

American rock band

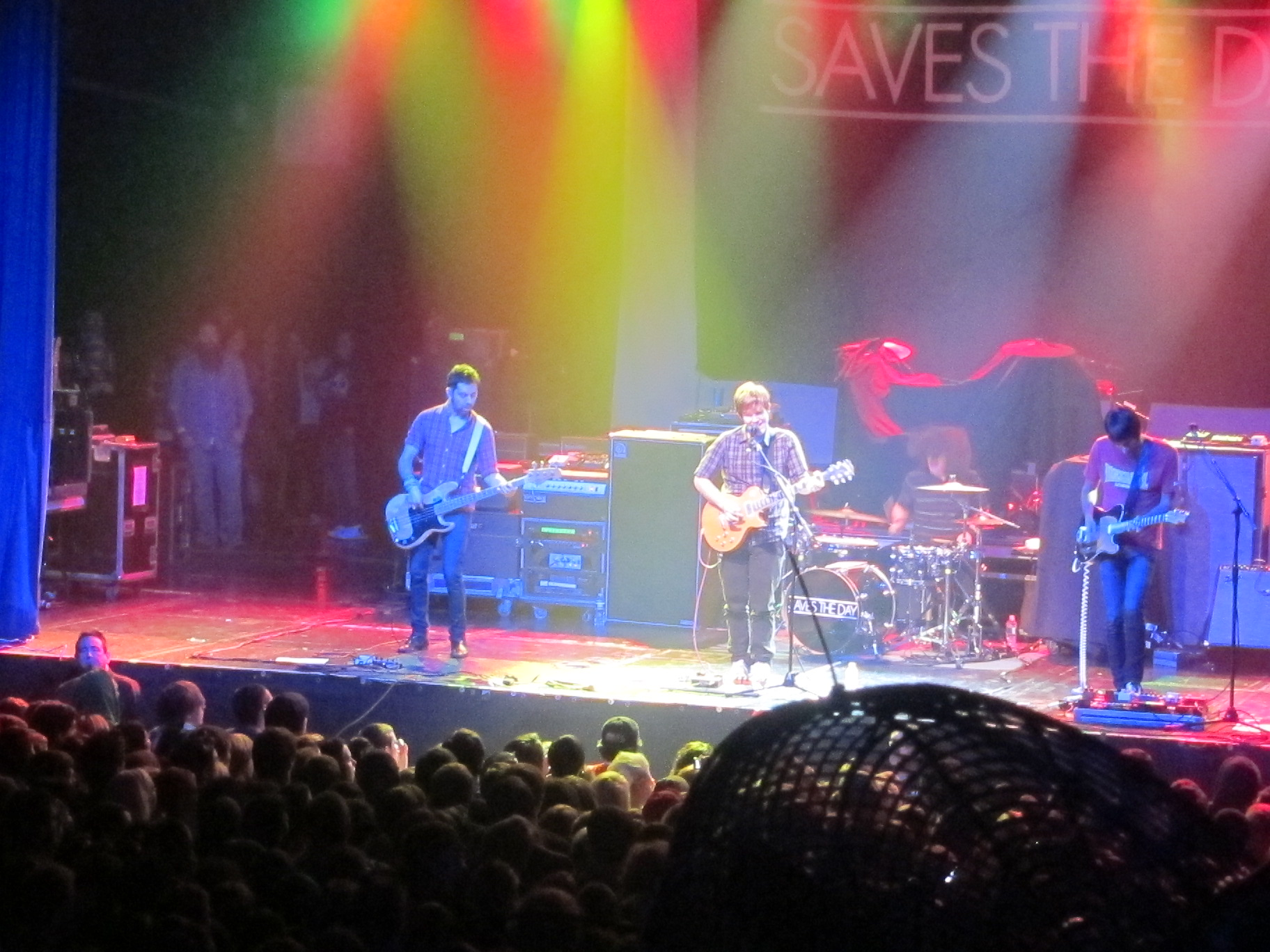
- Saves the Day performing in 2010

Background information
- Origin: Princeton, New Jersey, U.S.
- Genres: Emo; pop-punk; melodic hardcore; punk rock; hardcore punk (early)
- Years active: 1997–present
- Labels: Equal Vision; DreamWorks; Vagrant; Razor & Tie
- Members: Chris Conley; Arun Bali; Rodrigo Palma; Claudio Rivera
- Past members: See members section
- Website: savestheday.com

Saves the Day is an American rock band formed in 1997 in Princeton, New Jersey. The band currently consists of lead vocalist and guitarist Chris Conley, guitarist Arun Bali, bassist Rodrigo Palma, and drummer Claudio Rivera.

After forming under the name Sefler in 1994, Saves the Day released their debut studio album, Can't Slow Down, through Equal Vision Records in 1998. It was followed by Through Being Cool (1999), which featured their first single, "Shoulder to the Wheel". The band achieved mainstream success with the release of Stay What You Are (2001), released through Vagrant Records, which sold 200,000 copies and spawned the MTV2 hit singles ''At Your Funeral" and "Freakish". The album's success allowed the band to sign to the major label DreamWorks Records, who released the band's fourth album In Reverie (2003). DreamWorks folded into Interscope Records, who dropped the band weeks after the album's release. The band have since released five more albums under the Vagrant, Razor & Tie and Equal Vision labels, with their most recent, 9, being released on October 26, 2018.

The staff of Consequence ranked the band at number 18 on their list of "The 100 Best Pop Punk Bands" in 2019.

== History ==
=== Formation and first releases (1994–2000) ===
Sefler was a four-piece band, formed in 1994, which performed in the New Jersey area, and featured Chris Conley on bass guitar and vocals. Sefler changed its name to Saves the Day in late 1997. Of Saves the Day's original lineup, only Conley remains today; the band has gone through numerous personnel changes over the years, and has only recorded two consecutive albums with the same lineup (Through Being Cool and Stay What You Are, respectively), with Conley as the only permanent member.

Saves the Day's first proper release, Can't Slow Down, was recorded and released through Equal Vision Records in 1998, while the members were still in high school.

Using their own resources, Saves the Day released a five-song acoustic EP, I'm Sorry I'm Leaving, in early 1999. Later that year, they released their second full-length with Equal Vision, Through Being Cool, which saw them further refining their melodic sound. They began drawing attention from some of the larger independent labels, eventually signing with Vagrant Records.

=== Stay What You Are and commercial exposure (2001–2003) ===
In 2001, Saves the Day began moving away from their roots with the release of Stay What You Are. The album had a poppier feel, with more intricate guitar work and arrangements rather than the previous power chord-based sound. They gained some exposure with a video for the song "At Your Funeral", and made appearances on Conan O'Brien and The Late Late Show with Craig Kilborn. They also released a video for "Freakish" in April 2002; the video featured Muppet-esque puppets. Shortly after the album's release, guitarist Ted Alexander left and Conley took over guitar duties. The album was also original drummer Bryan Newman's last recording with the band, who also left shortly after the album's release. The album artwork featured photographs taken by the photo duo Day 19.

"At Your Funeral" reached No. 76 on the UK Singles Chart in June 2002.

=== Major label signing for In Reverie (2003–2005) ===
With the success of Stay What You Are, Saves the Day signed with major label DreamWorks Records, who would co-release their next album with Vagrant, who still had them under contract. The 2003 release of In Reverie saw them further experiment with their sound and featured less macabre lyrics than past recordings. The drastic change in sound was alienating among fans, and the album received little support from DreamWorks. The song "Anywhere With You" was released as a single, but went largely unnoticed, despite the album peaking at 27 on the Billboard Top 200 albums chart. Conley later said the following about the album's release in an interview with Skratch Magazine:

"DreamWorks Records completely abandoned it three days after it was released, saying that we made the wrong record. Then they were sold a month later. They were worthless."

Shortly after the album's release, DreamWorks Records was absorbed by Interscope, who would eventually drop them from its roster.

Saves the Day finally fulfilled their contractual obligations with Vagrant Records in 2004 with the release of Ups and Downs: Early Recordings and B-Sides, which was a collection of b-sides and included the I'm Sorry I'm Leaving EP. Ups and Downs also featured a song from their early days as Sefler. Conley said in an AP Podcast interview that the wrong Sefler song had been put on the CD. He had asked for a different song, but when he received the final version he discovered it was the wrong one. The album was dedicated to former bassist Sean McGrath, who died in 2004 at age 28, after a two-year battle with intestinal cancer. McGrath recorded with them on Can't Slow Down and had left during the writing of Through Being Cool. Saves the Day was relatively inactive in 2004, though during that time they set up their own studio, The Electric Ladybug, located in Chico, California.

=== Three-part concept: Sound the Alarm, Under the Boards and Daybreak (2005–2011) ===
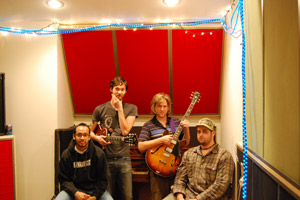
The band in 2007. L-R: Manuel Carrero, David Soloway, Chris Conley, Durijah Lang

In early 2005, Saves the Day began writing their follow-up to In Reverie. During the writing process, longtime bassist Eben D'Amico left and was replaced by Glassjaw bassist Manuel Carrero.

Saves the Day recorded their fifth studio album, Sound the Alarm, in 2005, without a label. They announced in January 2006 that they had re-signed with Vagrant, who would release Sound the Alarm in April. The album marked a return to their macabre lyrics and drew more from their influences than In Reverie had. During the Sound the Alarm recording sessions, they also recorded an EP of acoustic versions of several songs from past albums, which was sold on tour throughout 2006 as Bug Sessions Volume One. Saves the Day toured extensively throughout 2006 and early 2007 in support of the album. It was announced that Sound the Alarm was part one of a three-part concept. The next album in the trilogy, Under the Boards, was released in 2007. The third album in the series, Daybreak, was finally released in September 2011, after a very long wait by fans.

In February 2007, they announced that thirteen demos had already been recorded for a new album, which would be titled Under the Boards. It was also revealed that this would be the second of a three-part concept involving ''Sound the Alarm, Under the Boards and the yet to be released Daybreak. Chris Conley said that "Sound the Alarm is an expression of discontent. Under the Boards is reflection and remorse. Daybreak is acceptance."

Conley also said about the three-album concept:

"The whole trilogy was just a bit of a therapeutic experiment. I felt like all twisted up and broken inside and just angry and confused and depressed and sad and I couldn't really deal with the world or myself. So I was just like 'this has got to end, I have to at least try and get a grip on the world and on myself'. So I dove into the depths of my mind and brought out what I was finding, so the first album was filled with all the anger, the surface pain, and all the paranoid delusional thoughts that were there. The second album, Under the Boards, dealt with how all of that was making my life unbearable, and I realized I had to change, so that album was the transitional part, starting to transition out of that dark place, because you realize how it's affecting your life. So Daybreak is coming to terms with everything and trying to understand why I actually got that way and learning to accept it by exploring what it is and why it was there and simultaneously trying to grow through it and be a better person, not purely full of anger."

In March 2007, after more than four years with the band, drummer Pete Parada left to join the Offspring. Carrero's Glassjaw bandmate Durijah Lang took over drumming duties, and recorded on Under the Boards. The album was released on October 30, 2007, through Vagrant Records.

Chris Conley said in an interview that the next Bug Sessions would be a collection of live songs recorded on their 30-date acoustic tour. Volumes 2 and 3 of the once-tour-exclusive EPs were originally only sold on tour, but are now on the iTunes Music Store. After a string of shows on the East Coast in late October 2008, Saves the Day planned to enter the studio to begin work on their next studio album, Daybreak.

Saves the Day began working on Daybreak in 2009. It was announced in March 2009 that longstanding guitarist David Soloway would no longer be playing for Saves the Day. He continues to play bass for his side project Two Tongues with Chris Conley. In April, Arun Bali was announced as Soloway's replacement. Continuing this string of events, on December 21, it was announced that bassist Manuel Carrero and drummer Durijah Lang would be leaving to focus on Glassjaw. They were replaced by Rodrigo Palma on bass and Spencer Peterson (ex-Hidden In Plain View) on drums.

In September 2010, Peterson's personal website announced that he had left Saves the Day and joined Fall Out Boy's Pete Wentz's new electropop group Black Cards. About two weeks later, drummer Claudio Rivera's personal website announced that he had joined Saves the Day. In October 2010, the band announced that they would be selling dropcards to access a digital-only EP, 1984, while on tour with Say Anything and Motion City Soundtrack. The EP contains the track "1984" from the upcoming album.

Daybreak was released on September 13, 2011, through Razor & Tie, after several delays during the previous two years. This was the first time Saves the Day had released an album without a single band member (besides Conley) having played on an earlier record.

=== Saves the Day (2011–2015) ===
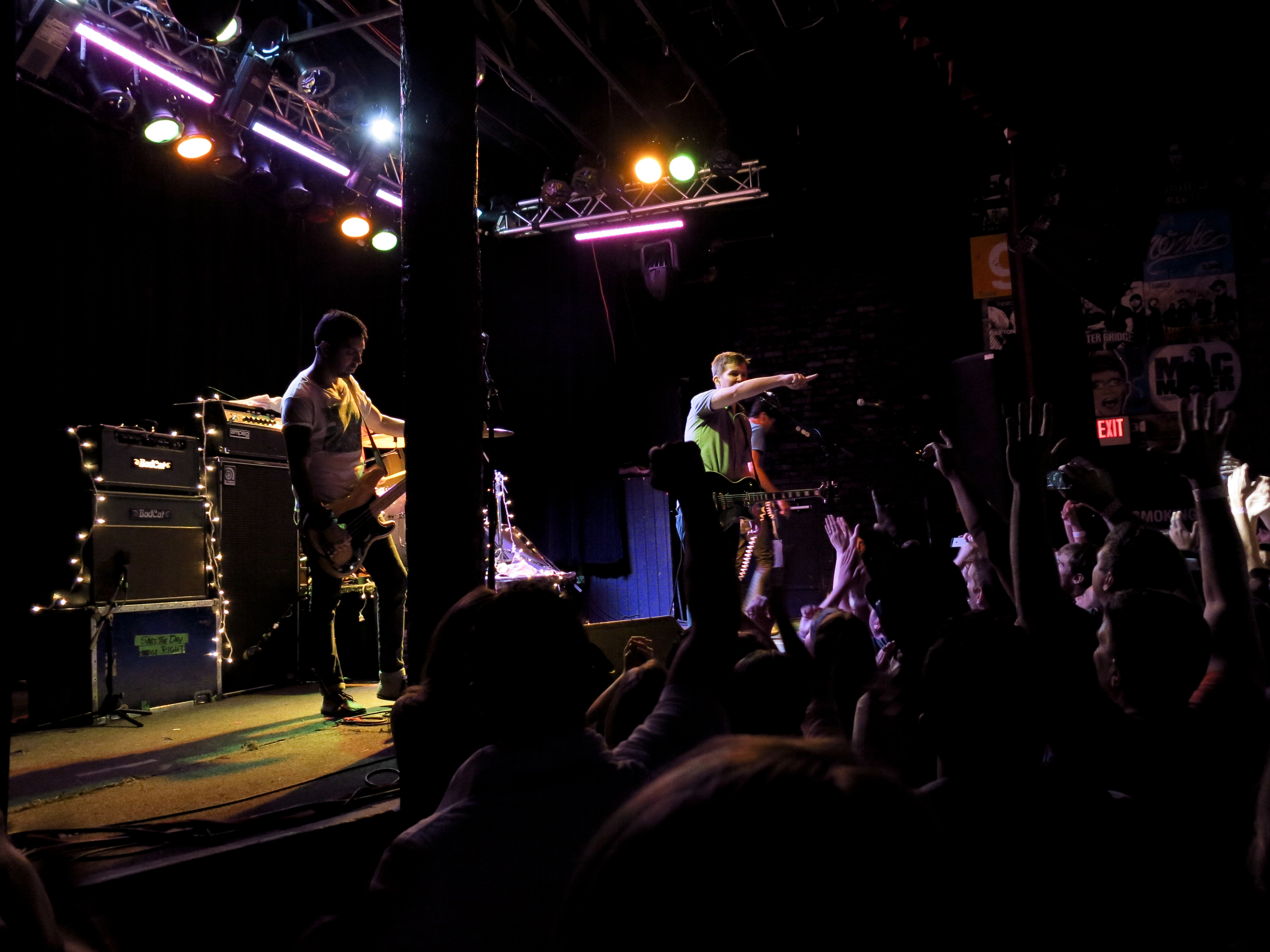
Saves the Day in 2013

In a December 2011 interview, Chris Conley revealed that an eighth Saves the Day album was in the works and that he was hoping that the band would be back in the studio in the fall of 2012 to record it. On November 23, 2012, Saves the Day announced they were making a new record, but wanted the fans to get involved. They signed up on PledgeMusic and offered fans everything from free downloads and album updates to limited edition T-shirts, tickets to shows, and private house shows. They released a demo to "pledgers" of one of the songs on the new album, "Ain't No Kind of Love", when pledging started. For Christmas 2012, they did a cover of "Baby Please Come Home", and in the new year, Weezer's "Across the Sea". Saves the Day released a music video for their song "Ring Pop" on YouTube. The album, titled Saves the Day, was released on September 17, 2013. On May 20, 2013, it was announced that Dennis Wilson had joined Saves the Day on a permanent basis, replacing former drummer Claudio Rivera. After the album was released, the band did two tours: a headlining North American tour, with Into It. Over It. and Hostage Calm supporting, and a North American holiday acoustic tour, with Walter Schreifels and Jon Simmons.

In 2014, Saves the Day supported Brand New on their UK tour.

On September 4, 2014, Saves the Day and Say Anything announced a co-headlining tour, with support from Reggie and the Full Effect. The three bands were celebrating anniversaries. Saves The Day celebrated 15 years since Through Being Cool; Say Anything had their 10th anniversary of ...Is a Real Boy, and Reggie celebrated Under The Tray.

=== 9 (2016–present) ===
On February 26, 2016, Chris Conley tweeted about the "first song on the next saves the day record" being his "new favorite song of all time."

On August 14, 2018, Saves the Day released a new song called "Rendezvous," and announced that they would be releasing their ninth album, containing nine tracks, and called 9, on October 26, 2018, via Equal Vision Records.

In 2020, drummer Dennis Wilson left Saves the Day and Claudio Rivera rejoined the band. (Wilson would later join Balance and Composure in 2023.)

On April 28, 2026, Taking Back Sunday announced that Saves the Day and Thrice will be with them for their 2026 Fall Tour.

On September 9, 2026, Saves the Day released a new single, "Invader", which also features Quicksand and Rival Schools frontman Walter Schreifels.

==== Sexual misconduct allegations ====
In May 2021, Conley was accused of sexual misconduct and abuse of power by a friend and former fan of his. Among the allegations included claims that Conley sent unsolicited nude photographs and manipulated his fandom to lure him into a relationship. Conley admitted to "making an unacceptable number of inappropriate missteps causing irreversible harm" and said "I am truly ashamed and embarrassed by my abhorrent behavior." Equal Vision Records stated "We are working diligently to uncover the truth behind what happened and our actions moving forward will reflect what we are able to find."

== Side projects ==
In 2009, Chris Conley and former Saves the Day guitarist David Soloway got together with Max Bemis and Coby Linder of Say Anything to form the supergroup Two Tongues. The group features Bemis and Conley sharing lead vocals and guitar duties, with Soloway on bass guitar and Linder on drums. Thirteen songs were recorded in Electric Ladybug Studio, Conley's home studio in Chico, California. Bemis, Conley, and Linder previously collaborated on a cover song of Bob Dylan's "The Man In Me" for the compilation album Paupers, Peasants, Princes & Kings: The Songs of Bob Dylan, released by Doghouse Records in 2006. The group's self-titled debut was released on February 3, 2009.

In Fall 2010, Two Tongues made their first public (surprise) performance in the middle of Say Anything's set each night of the Motion City Soundtrack/Say Anything/Saves the Day tour, performing the song "Crawl". Arun Bali (current guitarist of Saves the Day) played guitar, Kenny Vasoli (of the Starting Line and Person L) played bass, Jake Turner (of Say Anything) played guitar, and Coby Linder played drums, while Chris Conley and Max Bemis sang.

== Band members ==
Current

- Chris Conley – lead vocals (1994–present), rhythm guitar (2002–present), bass (1994–1998)
- Arun Bali – lead guitar, backing vocals (2009–present)
- Rodrigo Palma – bass (2009–present)
- Claudio Rivera – drums (2010–2013, 2020–present)

Former

- Bryan Newman – drums, percussion (1994–2002)
- Justin Gaylord – lead and rhythm guitar (1994–1997)
- Chris Zampella – lead and rhythm guitar (1997–1998)
- Anthony Anastasio – lead and rhythm guitar (1997–1998)
- David Soloway – lead guitar, backing vocals (1998–2009)
- Ted Alexander – rhythm guitar (1998–2002)
- Sean McGrath – bass (1998–1999; died 2004)
- Eben D'Amico – bass, backing vocals (1999–2005)
- Pete Parada – drums, percussion (2002–2007)
- Manuel Carrero – bass (2005–2009)
- Durijah Lang – drums, percussion (2007–2009)
- Spencer Peterson – drums, percussion (2009–2010)
- Dennis Wilson – drums, percussion (2013–2020)

Touring

- Damon Atkinson – drums, percussion (2002)
- Alex Garcia-Rivera – drums, percussion (2002)
- Reed Black – keyboards (2003–2005)
- Thomas Hunter – guitar (2009)
- Alexander Kent – bass (2009)
- Chris Keene – guitar, backing vocals (2019–present)

== Discography ==
Studio albums

- Can't Slow Down (1998)
- Through Being Cool (1999)
- Stay What You Are (2001)
- In Reverie (2003)
- Sound the Alarm (2006)
- Under the Boards (2007)
- Daybreak (2011)
- Saves the Day (2013)
- 9 (2018)
