= Can't Slow Down (Saves the Day album) =

Studio album by Saves the Day
- Released: August 11, 1998
- Recorded: Winter 1997
- Genre: Melodic hardcore
- Length: 31:19
- Label: Equal Vision
- Producer: Steve Evetts

Saves the Day chronology
Can't Slow Down (1998)	I'm Sorry I'm Leaving (1999)

Professional ratings
Review scores
Source	Rating
AllMusic	2.5/5 stars
Ox-Fanzine	Favorable

Can't Slow Down is the debut album by American rock band Saves the Day, released on August 11, 1998, by Equal Vision Records. The band formed in late 1997.

== Recording ==
The album was produced by Steve Evetts purely because he had previously worked with Lifetime, a band vocalist Chris Conley loved. It was recorded during the winter break of Conley's senior year of high school, and released after the band graduated from high school. This album was the bass player Sean McGrath's only recording with Saves the Day. Notably, he was also responsible for changing the band's name from Sefler to Saves the Day.

Unlike their later releases, this album has a melodic hardcore sound, sharing the same sound of other bands like 7 Seconds and Lifetime.

== Release ==
Saves the Day went on their first full tour of U.S. with Bane. Can't Slow Down was released by Equal Vision Records on August 11, 1998. McGrath came up with the title of the album, taking it from the Lionel Richie album of the same name. The album sold 8,000 copies by the time Through Being Cool (1999) was released.

"Three Miles Down" inspired the band to record I'm Sorry I'm Leaving after a fan who was also an employee at Equal Vision suggested that they make an acoustic EP after hearing the song.

== Track listing ==
All songs written by Chris Conley.

1. "Deciding" – 1:55
2. "The Choke" – 2:35
3. "Handsome Boy" – 1:01
4. "Blindfolded" – 3:13
5. "Collision" – 1:25
6. "Three Miles Down" – 1:36
7. "Always Ten Feet Tall" – 3:25
8. "Nebraska Bricks" – 2:04
9. "Seeing It This Way" – 1:31
10. "Hot Time in Delaware" – 1:45
11. "Houses and Billboards" – 3:12
12. "Obsolete" – 1:57
13. "Sometimes, New Jersey" – 1:09
14. "Jodie" – 4:36

== Personnel ==
Personnel per booklet.

Saves the Day

- Anthony Anastasio – guitars
- Sean McGrath – bass
- Chris Conley – vocals
- Bryan Newman – drums
- Justin Gaylord – guitars

Production

- Steve Evetts – producer
- Alan Douches – mastering
- Jonathan Williams – cover photo
- Justine Demetrick – band photo
- Saves the Day – design
- Sean Mallinson – artwork, design
