= I'm Sorry I'm Leaving =

EP by Saves the Day
- Released: July 1, 1999
- Recorded: March 1999, Shoulder to the Wheel Studio
- Genre: Emo, pop punk
- Length: 12:31
- Label: Immigrant Sun

Saves the Day chronology
Can't Slow Down (1998)	I'm Sorry I'm Leaving (1999)	Through Being Cool (1999)

Professional ratings
Review scores
Source	Rating
AllMusic	2.5/5 stars

I'm Sorry I'm Leaving is an acoustic EP released by American rock band Saves the Day, released by Immigrant Sun on July 1, 1999.

It differed from the band's debut album, Can't Slow Down, by having a lighter acoustic sound.

== Background and recording ==
Saves the Day formed in late 1997. Their debut album, Can't Slow Down, was released with Equal Vision in August 1998. The album helped the band gain fans, but only in the New Jersey area. The band promoted the album with two tours, which helped the band expand their fan base. Saves the Day had three different line-up changes while touring Can't Slow Down, leaving vocalist Chris Conley and drummer Bryan Newman as the only original members left.

I'm Sorry I'm Leaving was recorded and mixed at Shoulder to the Wheel Studio in March 1999. The EP was mastered by M.J.R. at Metropolis Mastering Ltd.

== Release ==
I'm Sorry I'm Leaving was released on Immigrant Sun Records on July 1, 1999. It includes a cover of Modern English's "I Melt with You".

== Track listing ==
All songs written by Chris Conley, except "I Melt with You" by Modern English.

CD version

1. "I'm Sorry I'm Leaving" – 2:48
2. "Hold" – 2:22
3. "Jessie & My Whetstone" – 2:06
4. "Take Our Cars Now!" – 2:38
5. "I Melt with You" (Modern English cover) – 2:57

7" vinyl version

1. "I'm Sorry I'm Leaving"
2. "Hold"
3. "The Way His Collar Falls"

== Personnel ==
Personnel per booklet.

Saves the Day

- Chris Conley – vocals
- Bryan Newman – drums
- Eben D'Amico – bass
- Ted Alexander – rhythm guitar
- David Soloway – lead guitar

Production

- M.J.R. – mastering
- Sean Mallinson – layout, design
