= Stay What You Are =

Studio album by Saves the Day
- Released: July 10, 2001
- Recorded: March–April 2001
- Studios: Sunset Sound and Sound Factory, Hollywood, California; Sonora Sound, Los Feliz, California
- Genres: Emo; pop punk; power pop; post-hardcore
- Length: 33:33
- Label: Vagrant
- Producer: Rob Schnapf

Saves the Day chronology
Through Being Cool (1999)	Stay What You Are (2001)	In Reverie (2003)

Stay What You Are is the third studio album from American rock band Saves the Day, released in 2001. The album received positive reviews from critics at the time of its release and remains an influential album in the emo and pop punk genres. It has been described as "channel[ling] the thrill of pop punk, the intellect of indie rock, and the raw emotion of emo all at once." Lead single "At Your Funeral" charted in the United Kingdom.

== Background and production ==
While on tour, in March 2000, the band got into a van accident that almost ended the band's career. The van accident was somewhat of an inspiration for the band's song writing. By this point, vocalist Chris Conley "really felt confident" and subsequently had "a lot more fun" while writing. Conley had a personal recording studio set-up where he would "spend the entire day" in "building songs in my own little world." In April, it was announced the band had signed to Vagrant Records due to the success of Through Being Cool (1999). Later that month, Punknews.org reported that the group would release their next album in early 2001. In January 2001, Punknews.org reported that the band was recording with Steve Evetts, who had produced the group's previous two albums.

Recording began on March 17, 2001 and continued into April, lasting thrice as long as their preceding two records. Conley described producer Rob Schnapf as "a really mellow, laid back guy. Him being relaxed just made for a nice, creative environment in the studio." Recording was spread over three studios: Sunset Sound and Sound Factory in Hollywood, California, and Sonora Sound in Los Feliz, California. Doug Boehm recorded the proceedings with assistance from Steven Rhodes and Seth Mclain. Josh Turner acted as the Pro Tools engineer during the sessions. Productivity was initially slow due to, as the band explains, "some difficulty we're having with tuning guitars". Richard Barron performed organ on "Cars & Calories". Schnapf and Boehm mixed the recordings, while Don C. Tyler mastered them at Precision Mastering. 13 tracks were recorded in total, including two outtakes "Ups and Downs" and "For Erminie".

== Composition ==
While Stay What You Are has been tagged as post-hardcore, power pop and pop punk, it saw the band move into post-punk territory, alongside the mixing of emo with the aggressiveness of post-grunge. It was a more mellow, darker and melodic effort than their preceding two albums, drawing comparison to the Promise Ring and Seaweed. Conley said the slower sound was intentional, as the band didn't want to perform fast-paced music anymore and wished to let the melodies carry the songs.

The opening track "At Your Funeral" talks about the death of a friend. "Cars & Calories" talks about celebrity culture. Conley explained that he "felt sort of mildly alienated at different points in my life just looking at culture, especially this hectic, modern culture." Conley wrote the song in an empty room at Vagrant Records' offices. He played open chords, and the rest of the song soon followed. "Jukebox Breakdown" talks about taking liberties when making music and the resultant backlash that comes with it. "As Your Ghost Takes Flight" is about a friend's heroin addiction. "Nightingale" uses distorted vocals. "All I'm Losing Is Me" tackles problems facing Generation X and asks several questions. The ballad "This Is Not an Exit" was compared to "Out of Reach" by the Get Up Kids.

== Release ==
In early June 2001, an MP3 of "See You" was posted on PopPunk.com. The group embarked on a brief two-week US tour, leading into a few shows in Japan later in the month. After initially planned for release on June 5, Stay What You Are was eventually released on July 10 through Vagrant Records. The group was planned to appear on the Warped Tour, however, they instead headlined the Vagrant America Tour between early July and early September. Partway through the trek, the band appeared at Krazy Fest 4 in Louisville, Kentucky. "At Your Funeral" was released as a radio single in September. Also during that month, a music video was filmed for the song in Los Angeles. It features a creative way of motion control, similar to Requiem for a Dream. Following the Vagrant America Tour, drummer Bryan Newman left the band in September to study at college. His position was temporarily filled by Damon Atkinson of Hey Mercedes.

In November and December, the group went on tour with Hey Mercedes, Thursday Whatever It Takes, and Kind of Like Spitting. In late November, the "At Your Funeral" video premiered on MTV2. In December 2001, the band performed on The Late Late Show; the following month, they appeared Late Night with Conan O'Brien. In January 2002, the band supported Weezer on the Hyper Extended Midget Tour in the US. In February and March, the band toured with Small Brown Bike and Piebald, which was followed by a supporting slot for Alkaline Trio on their UK headlining tour. In May, a music video was filmed for "Freakish", featuring Muppet-esque puppets. The band supported on Blink-182 and Green Day on their co-headlining Pop Disaster Tour in May and June. On July 15, it was announced that the band had kicked out guitarist Ted Alexander. In August, the band appeared at Bizarre Festival in Germany. In October and November, the group went on a headlining US tour with support from Ash.

== Reception and legacy ==
Professional ratings
Review scores
Source	Rating
AllMusic	4/5 stars
Billboard	Favorable
Chart Attack	Favorable
DecoyMusic	4/5 stars
Exclaim!	Favorable
LAS Magazine	Favorable
The Morning Call	Mixed
Ox-Fanzine	10/10
Pitchfork	2.9/10
Sputnikmusic	4.5/5 stars

Stay What You Are sold 14,970 copies in its first week, and 70,000 copies by the end of the year. By March 2002, the album had sold over 120,000 copies, becoming one of Vagrant's best-selling releases. Stay What You Are reached number 100 on the Billboard 200 albums chart.

In the years since its release, Stay What You Are is widely regarded as a classic and a highly influential piece of music for the emo and pop punk genres. It appeared on best-of emo album lists by Houston Press, Loudwire and NME. Similarly, Paste included the video for "At Your Funeral" at number seven of their 10 Best Emo Music Videos list, and the song appeared on a best-of emo songs list by Vulture. Tim Landers of Transit and Brandon McMaster of The Crimson Armada featured the album on their Five Albums That Changed My Life lists. In 2014, the Holophonics released a ska tribute version of the album. Saves the Day played the album in full at FYF Fest in August 2016.

== Track listing ==
All songs written by Bryan Newman, Chris Conley, David Soloway, Eben D'Amico and Ted Alexander.

1. "At Your Funeral" – 3:09
2. "See You" – 2:08
3. "Cars & Calories" – 2:45
4. "Certain Tragedy" – 2:27
5. "Jukebox Breakdown" – 3:04
6. "Freakish" – 3:47
7. "As Your Ghost Takes Flight" – 2:25
8. "Nightingale" – 3:36
9. "All I'm Losing Is Me" – 3:22
10. "This Is Not an Exit" – 3:56
11. "Firefly" – 2:51

== Personnel ==
Personnel per sleeve.

Saves the Day

- Chris Conley – vocals
- David Soloway – lead guitar
- Eben D'Amico – bass
- Bryan Newman – drums
- Ted Alexander – rhythm guitar

Additional musician

- Richard Barron – organ (track 3)

Production

- Rob Schnapf – producer, mixing
- Doug Boehm – recording, mixing
- Steven Rhodes – assistant
- Seth Mclain – assistant
- Josh Turner – Pro Tools engineer
- Bryan Newman – photography, design
- Jeremy Weiss – additional booklet photography
- Kevin Kusatsu – additional booklet photography
- Joby J. Ford – design
- Don C. Tyler – mastering

== Charts ==
Chart performance for Stay What You Are
Chart (2001-02)	Peak position
UK Independent Albums (Official Charts)	34
US Billboard 200	100
