= In Reverie =

Studio album by Saves the Day
- Released: September 16, 2003
- Studios: Larrabee Studios East, Cello Studios
- Genres: Indie rock; melodic punk; pop; power pop
- Length: 33:55
- Label: DreamWorks
- Producer: Rob Schnapf

Saves the Day chronology
Stay What You Are (2001)	In Reverie (2003)	Ups & Downs: Early Recordings and B-Sides (2004)

In Reverie is the fourth studio album by the American rock band Saves the Day. In Reverie was released in mid-September through DreamWorks. Shortly after its release, DreamWorks was absorbed by Interscope Records, resulting in the band being dropped from the label.

== Background and recording ==
In July 2001, Saves the Day released Stay What You Are through independent label Vagrant Records. The album's first single, "At Your Funeral", became the band's breakthrough hit. The album would go on to sell over 120,000 copies by early 2002. Frontman Chris Conley was, according to Gigwise's David Renshaw, "hailed as a hero with his lyrics about broken hearts and relationships." Line-up changes soon occurred: drummer Bryan Newman and guitarist Ted Alexander left the group. Conley, who had previously written songs on guitar, began playing it in the group. Newman was replaced by Face to Face drummer Pete Parada. In February 2002, the group were rumoured to have signed with major label Interscope Records.

In January 2003, the group was doing pre-production in Los Angeles. They were reportedly working on 18 songs. Prior to recording, the group wished to "capture the songs" as best as they could, according to Conley. Recording took place at Larrabee Studios East and Cello Studios with producer Rob Schnapf and engineer Doug Boehm. The pair were assisted by engineer Jeff Moses at Larrabee Studios East and by engineer Steven Rhodes at Cello Studios. Richard Barron played organ on "Rise", "Monkey" and "Tomorrow Too Late". Schnapf played the tambourine on "Driving in the Dark".

Rhodes performed various percussion instruments on the recordings. Reed Black contributed a number of instruments to different tracks: electric piano ("Anywhere with You", "Monkey", "In My Waking Life" and "She"), grand piano ("Rise"), mellotron ("She" and "Wednesday the Third") and synth ("In Reverie"). Schnapf and Boehm mixed the album at The Sound Factory with assistance from engineer Kevin Dean. Ted Jensen mastered the album at Sterling Sound in New York City in May 2003. Conley later revealed that the group created "a record we're proud of". Two songs that did not make it on to the album, "Shattered" and "Delusional", were re-worked for the group's next album, Sound the Alarm (2006).

== Composition ==
While working with Schnapf on Stay What You Are, Conley learned that he was writing songs out of his vocal range. He subsequently learned how to sing notes naturally as opposed to forcing them. Conley's voice subsequently changed for In Reverie. Comparing the material to that of Stay What You Are, Conley described the songs as being "more harmonically intricate" as well as "more complicated melodically". He said that after getting into the Beatles following Stay What You Are, he learned "a bunch of complex chords", which influenced his creativity. Despite being credited to the band, Conley wrote all of the songs. Though, he said he was "nowhere near [a] dictator" and often enjoyed what parts the other members came up with. He added, whenever guitarist David Soloway came up with a part "it’s exactly the right thing; it’s more than I could have imagined." Musically, the album has been described as indie rock, melodic punk, pop and power pop.

One day, Conley was playing guitar and came up with the opening riff for "Anywhere with You". The remainder of the song soon followed. Bassist Eben D'Amico said the track was originally titled "Cactus Stomp" before it had any lyrics. Conley said it talks about "longing for something better — for a feeling of peace or completeness". "What Went Wrong" was written nine to ten months before the group worked on the album. Conley did not think the track was worthy enough, until one morning when he woke up with the song in his head. The song is about a kid who is being strip-searched despite having done nothing wrong. "Driving in the Dark" is about searching for peace in the world and not in a person. Conley said "Rise" was about "looking around and seeing everyone else trying to buy this or that and thinking it's going to make them happy." Conley mentioned that reverie refers to being in a dreamlike state, and the title-track is about that: "...floating through life and trying to figure it all out ... transcending the things you get really pissed off about".

"Morning in the Moonlight" talks about joy. "Monkey" is about filling up empty space with material possessions, despite said possessions still leaving you empty. Conley came up with the melody for "In My Waking Life" while at his mom's house. The track simply "appeared in my mind as if it were a cloud coming over the horizon." "She" is about being both confused and in love with the various aspects of life. Around the time the band toured with Weezer, Conley was suffering from Crohn's disease, which inspired "Where Are You?". The track is about "taking everything in, the depression, confusion and anxiety, but also the incredible highs." "Wednesday the Third" is about "telling ... off" The Man. Conley explained he's "drawing a line in the sand and crossing over to the other side, which means I'm done with the past – onward and inward." With "Tomorrow Too Late", Conley is personifying the feeling of restlessness and the need for peace.

== Release ==
On May 17, 2003, the album was titled In Reverie, and was expected for release in September that year. The album was planned to be Saves the Day's final one for Vagrant; they brought in some staff members from major label DreamWorks Records to hear the new songs. The staff enjoyed the songs so much that they proceeded to buy the record from Vagrant. They signed to DreamWorks in July 2003. Conley reasoned they were under the impression that as the label had no shareholders that interfered in business choices, they were driven by artistic decisions. "Anywhere with You" was posted online on July 24, and released to radio on August 12. Around this time, a music video was filmed for the song in Los Angeles. It features the group performing the song in a recording studio. On August 16, the group released an e-card, which included four new songs: "Anywhere with You", "Driving in the Dark", "What Went Wrong" and "Where Are You?". At the end of August, the band appeared at the Terremoto Festival. In Reverie was released through DreamWorks Records on September 16. The album's artwork was done by Brazilian artist Stephan Doitschinoff, who the group met while in the UK in 2002. A few days later, In Honor: A Compilation to Beat Cancer, a tribute to the band's former bassist Sean McGrath, was released featuring an In Reverie outtake "Don't Go Outside". From mid-September to late November, the group went on a co-headlining US tour with Taking Back Sunday. They were supported by Moneen.

On October 20, 2003, the band appeared on Jimmy Kimmel Live!. Following the band's biggest headlining show in Asbury Park, NJ to 4,000 people, Conley received a call from the band's A&R person at DreamWorks: "[H]e said, 'None of the programmers at radio are biting at the single, and MTV doesn't want to play the video, so we're going have to start thinking about the next record.' I had a total breakdown. I was like, 'How is this possible? The album just came out!'" A few weeks after In Reverie's release, the label was absorbed by Interscope Records. The staff at Interscope didn't care for the album, refusing to take the group's calls. They subsequently paid the band severance to leave the label. In March and April 2004, the band went on a co-headlining US tour with Grandaddy, with support from the Fire Theft. Dios opened the first half of the tour, while Hey Mercedes opened the second half. Halfway through it, the Fire Theft dropped off the tour due to their vocalist falling ill. Following this, the band supported Ash on their UK tour in May and June. In April 2009, the band was tentatively planning to re-release the album with up to 12 additional tracks. According to Conley, the reissue would've included demos and "whatnot. 'Zeebs' and 'Sister Sophs' and all that shit, 'Blossom' and what have you. All that. Then more."

== Reception ==
Professional ratings
Aggregate scores
Source	Rating
Metacritic	77/100
Review scores
Source	Rating
AllMusic	3.5/5 stars
Blender	3/5 stars
Drowned in Sound	8/10
Entertainment Weekly	A−
Exclaim!	Favorable
The Phoenix	Favorable
PopMatters	Favorable
Punknews.org	4/5 stars
Rolling Stone	3/5 stars
Spin	C+

In Reverie sold 34,000 copies in its first week, reaching number 27 on the Billboard 200. Despite no video or radio play, it went on to sell 150,000 copies by mid-2006.

== Track listing ==
All music by Saves the Day and all lyrics by Christopher Conley.

1. "Anywhere with You" – 2:32
2. "What Went Wrong" – 2:49
3. "Driving in the Dark" – 3:14
4. "Rise" – 3:12
5. "In Reverie" – 2:27
6. "Morning in the Moonlight" – 1:55
7. "Monkey" – 3:23
8. "In My Waking Life" – 2:49
9. "She" – 2:34
10. "Where Are You?" – 1:47
11. "Wednesday the Third" – 3:39
12. "Tomorrow Too Late" – 3:33

Special edition bonus tracks
No.	Title	Length
13.	"Don't Go Outside"	1:55
14.	"Coconut"	3:10

=== Other songs from the In Reverie era ===
- "Coconut": available on the special edition of the album and as a download for those who owned the In Reverie CD
- "Blossom": available as a b-side on vinyl copies of the "Anywhere With You" single and as a download for those who owned the In Reverie CD
- "Don't Go Outside": available on the special edition of the album and also on the compilation In Honor: A Compilation to Beat Cancer. It was available as a download for those who owned the In Reverie CD

== Personnel ==
Personnel per booklet.

Saves the Day

- Christopher Conley – vocals, rhythm guitar
- Eben D'Amico – bass
- Pete Parada – drums
- David Soloway – lead guitar

Additional musicians

- Reed Black – electric piano (tracks 1 and 7–9), grand piano (track 4), mellotron (tracks 9 and 11), synth (track 5)
- Richard Barron – organ (tracks 4, 7 and 12)
- Steven Rhodes – various percussion
- Rob Schnapf – tambourine (track 3)

Production

- Rob Schnapf – producer, mixing
- Doug Boehm – engineer, mixing
- Ted Jensen – mastering
- Jeff Moses – assistant engineer
- Steven Rhodes – assistant engineer
- Kevin Dean – assistant engineer
- Eben D'Amico – art direction
- Trooper CA – art direction, design
- Stephan Doitschinoff – illustrations

== Charts ==
Chart performance for In Reverie
Chart (2003)	Peak position
US Billboard 200	27
US Independent Albums (Billboard)	4
