= Eisley discography =

- Studio albums: 5
- Extended plays: 10
- Music videos: 7

The discography of Eisley, an American rock band from Tyler, Texas. Eisley is composed of Sherri DuPree-Bemis (vocals, guitar), Stacy DuPree-King (vocals, keyboard), Chauntelle DuPree D'Agostino (guitar, vocals), Weston DuPree (drums) and Garron DuPree (bass guitar). They have released five studio albums, ten EPs, and seven music videos. In addition, they have appeared on numerous compilation albums and have recorded many tracks that were never officially released.

== Albums ==
Year	Album	Chart positions			
Year	Album	US	US Alt	US Indie	US Rock
2005	Room Noises: Released February 8, 2005; Label: Reprise	189	—	—	—
2007	Combinations: Released August 14, 2007; Label: Reprise	70	23	—	23
2011	The Valley: Released March 1, 2011; Label: Equal Vision	80	15	12	20
2013	Currents: Released May 28, 2013; Label: Equal Vision	66	17	11	22
2017	I'm Only Dreaming: Released February 17, 2017; Label: Equal Vision	83	—	8	15

== EPs ==
Release date	Title	Label
2000	EP1	Self-released
2002	EP2	Self-released
2003	Laughing City	Record Collection
2003	Marvelous Things E.P.	Reprise
2005	Telescope Eyes E.P.	Reprise
2005	Head Against The Sky E.P.	Reprise
2006	Final Noise E.P.	Reprise
2007	Like the Actors E.P.	Reprise
2009	Fire Kite E.P.	Sire
2012	Deep Space E.P.	Equal Vision

== Music videos ==
Release date	Song	Director
2004	Marvelous Things	Philip Andelman
2004	I Wasn't Prepared (Earlier Version)	Boyd DuPree
2005	Telescope Eyes	AV Club
2005	I Wasn't Prepared	Marvin Jarrett
2007	Invasion	Miranda Penn
2007	Memories	Cory Sheldon
2011	Smarter	Chris Phelps
2011	The Valley	Cory Sheldon
2013	Currents	Darren King
2017	Louder Than a Lion	Israel Anthem
2017	Always Wrong	Israel Anthem

== Independent recordings ==
Eisley's early independent recordings have been confusing for new fans. The track listings are:

- EP1 – "Pretender", "Dream for Me", "Blackened Crown"
- EP2 version 1 – "Telescope Eyes", "Over the Mountains We Go", "Head Against the Sky"
- EP2 version 2 – Version 1 plus "Dream for Me" and "Blackened Crown"
- EP2 version 3 – Version 2 plus "Mister Pine" and "Laughing City"

Eisley simply added the best of each EP and carried them forward. None of these recordings was released officially but sold at hundreds of shows between 1999 and 2003. EP2 version 3 contains all of the songs from the previous versions, including EP1, except for "Pretender." All songs on the independent recordings are owned by Eisley and they have generously allowed their fans to offer them for download from various places on the web.

== See also ==
- Eisley
