= Dupré =

Dupré is a French name that literally means "from the meadow" ("pré" in French), or "from Prez". Also existing variants are Duprée, DuPree, Deupree, DePrez, Dupres, Duprez, Düpre and Du Preez.

== Notable people ==
- Anna Johnson Dupree (1891–1977), Texas businesswoman and philanthropist
- Ashley Alexandra Dupré (born 1985), stage name of the former prostitute connected to the Eliot Spitzer prostitution scandal
- August Dupré, British chemist and explosives expert
- Augustin Dupré (1748–1833), French engraver
- Billy Joe DuPree (born 1950), American football player
- Bud Dupree (born 1993), American football player
- Champion Jack Dupree, (c.1910–1992) US-American blues pianist
- Charles Dupré (1827–1907), Dutch chess master
- Cornell Dupree, (1942–2011) US-American jazz and R&B guitarist
- Emile Duprée (1936–2023), wrestling promoter
- Fourie du Preez (born 1982), former South African rugby union player
- Frik du Preez (born 1925), former South African rugby union player
- Garron DuPree (born 1989), musician and member of the band Eisley
- George Dupre (1903–1982), Canadian impostor
- Giovanni Dupré (1817–1882) Italian sculptor
- Guy Dupré (1928–2018), French writer
- Jacqueline du Pré (1945-1987), English cellist
- Jermaine Dupri (born 1972), record producer
- Jesse James Dupree (born 1962), singer of American rock band Jackyl
- John Dupré (born in 1952), philosopher of science
- Jos Dupré (1928–2021), Belgian politician
- Jules Dupré (1812–1889), painter
- Louis Dupré(dancer) (1697–1774), ballet dancer, ballet master and ballet teacher
- Louis Dupré (philosopher) (1925–2022), Catholic phenomenologist and religious philosopher
- Louis Dupree (professor) (1925–1989), Afghanistan scholar
- Louis George Dupree, (1932–2001), American football player
- Malachi Dupre (born 1995), American football player
- Marcel Dupré (1886–1971), French organist and composer
- Marie Jules Dupré (1813–1881), French admiral. governor of Réunion and Cochinchina
- Marc Dupré (born 1973), humorist and musician
- Marcus Dupree (born 1964), American football player
- Melissa Dupré (born 1986), athlete
- Mignon du Preez (born 1989), South African cricketer
- Minnie Dupree, (1873–1947) American stage and screen actress
- Nancy Dupree (1927–2017), Afghanistan scholar
- Nathalie Dupree (1939–2025), American author, chef, and cooking show host
- Nick Dupree (1982–2017), American disability rights activist and writer
- René Duprée (born 1983), professional wrestler
- Robbie Dupree (born 1946), American singer
- Sherri DuPree (born 1983), musician and member of the band Eisley
- Taylor Deupree (born 1971), musician
- Thomas Ludger Dupré (1933-2016), American Catholic Bishop

== Fictional characters ==
- Desiree Dupree, a character from American Horror Story: Freak Show played by Angela Bassett
- Randy Dupree from You, Me and Dupree, a comedy film
- Dupre, a character in the Ultima series of computer games

== Music ==
- "Dupree's Paradise" is a song by Frank Zappa
- "Mitzi Dupree", a song by British rock band Deep Purple from their album The House of Blue Light
- Simon Dupree and the Big Sound, ann English band of the 1960s best known for their psychedelic single "Kites".
- "Cousin Dupree", a song on Steely Dan's 2000 album Two Against Nature
- "Dupree's Diamond Blues", a song on the Grateful Dead's album Aoxomoxoa.
