= Aouste =

- Commune
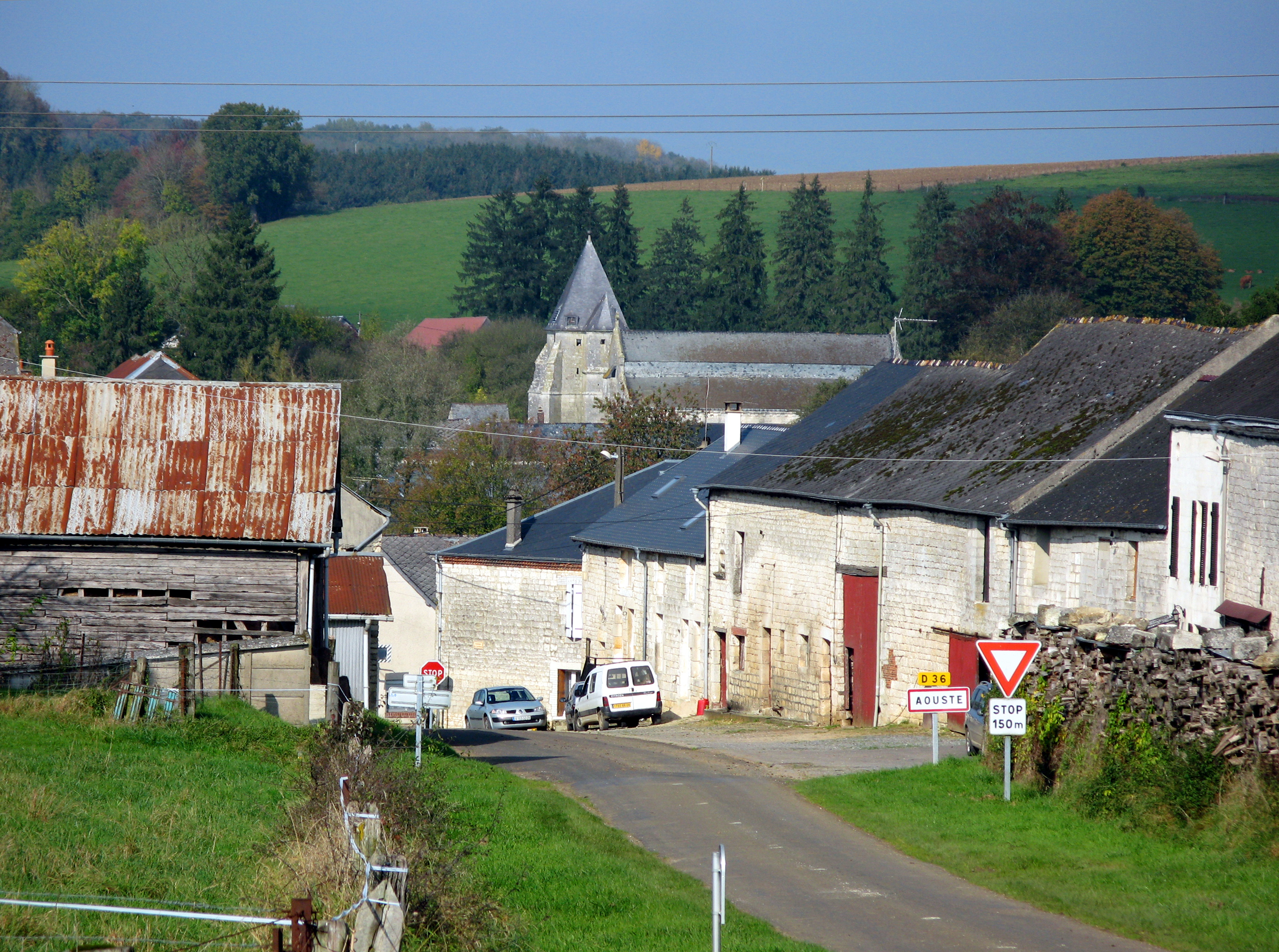
- The D36 road from La Férée (to the south) passes through Aouste to Prez in the east.

- Coat of arms
- Location of Aouste
- Location within France Location within Grand Est
- Coordinates: 49°47′54″N 4°18′59″E
- Country: France
- Region: Grand Est
- Department: Ardennes
- Arrondissement: Charleville-Mézières
- Canton: Signy-l'Abbaye
- Intercommunality: Ardennes Thiérache

Government
  - Mayor (2020–2026): Xavier Coffart
- Area^{1}: 12.83 km^{2} (4.95 sq mi)
- Elevation: 205 m (673 ft)
- Highest elevation: 289 m (948 ft)
- Lowest elevation: 187 m (614 ft)
- Population (2023): 196
  - Density: 15.3/km^{2} (39.6/sq mi)
- Time zone: UTC+01:00 (CET)
  - Summer (DST): UTC+02:00 (CEST)
- INSEE/Postal code: 08016 /08290
- ^{1} French Land Register data, which excludes lakes, ponds, glaciers > 1 km^{2} (0.386 sq mi or 247 acres) and river estuaries.

Aouste (French pronunciation: [aust]) is a commune in the Ardennes department in the Grand Est region of northern France.

== Geography ==
Aouste is located some 35 km south-east of Hirson and 40 km west by north-west of Charleville-Mézières. Access is by the D36 road from La Férée in the south passing through the village then continuing east to Prez. The D27 road also comes from Rumigny in the west passing through the commune south of the village and continuing to Marlemont in the south-east. A railway from Hirson to Charleville-Mezieres passes through the commune with a station at Liart just outside the commune to the south-east. Apart from the village the commune is mostly farmland with a few patches of forest.

The Aube river passes through the commune from the east and flows through the village before continuing west to join the Ton at Hannappes. The Ruisseau de Laval d'Estrebay flows from the north forming part of the northern border to join the Aube on the western border. There is also the Ruisseau du Moulin Veron which flows from the south joining the Aube near the village. The Ruisseau de Gandlu flows from the south-east joining the Aube in the village.

=== Heraldry ===
Arms of Aouste	Blazon: Argent, a lion of Sable, in chief a bar embattled-counter-embattled of Gules, the whole bordure in Vert.

== Administration ==
List of Successive Mayors

From	To	Name	Party	Position
1995	current	Xavier Coffart	UMP	General Councillor (1998–2004)

== Demography ==
The inhabitants of the commune are known as Aoustiens or Aoustiennes in French.

Historical population

Year	Pop.	±% p.a.
1793	542	—
1821	616	+0.46%
1846	624	+0.05%
1872	607	−0.11%
1901	516	−0.56%
1926	421	−0.81%
1946	360	−0.78%
1962	332	−0.50%
1968	292	−2.12%

Year	Pop.	±% p.a.
1975	264	−1.43%
1982	268	+0.22%
1990	203	−3.41%
1999	208	+0.27%
2007	203	−0.30%
2012	203	+0.00%
2017	207	+0.39%
2023	196	−0.91%

Source: EHESS and INSEE

== Sites and monuments ==
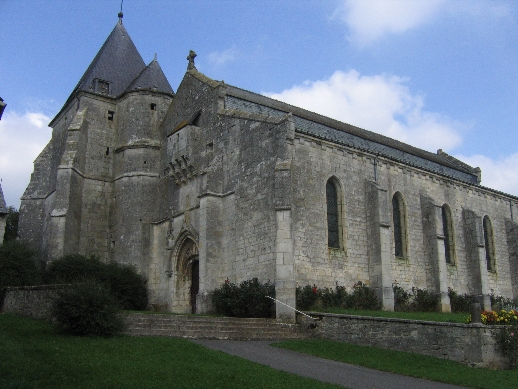
The fortified church of Saint-Rémi at Aouste

.

The fortified Church of Saint-Rémi (15th century) is registered as an historical monument.

=== Aouste Picture Gallery ===
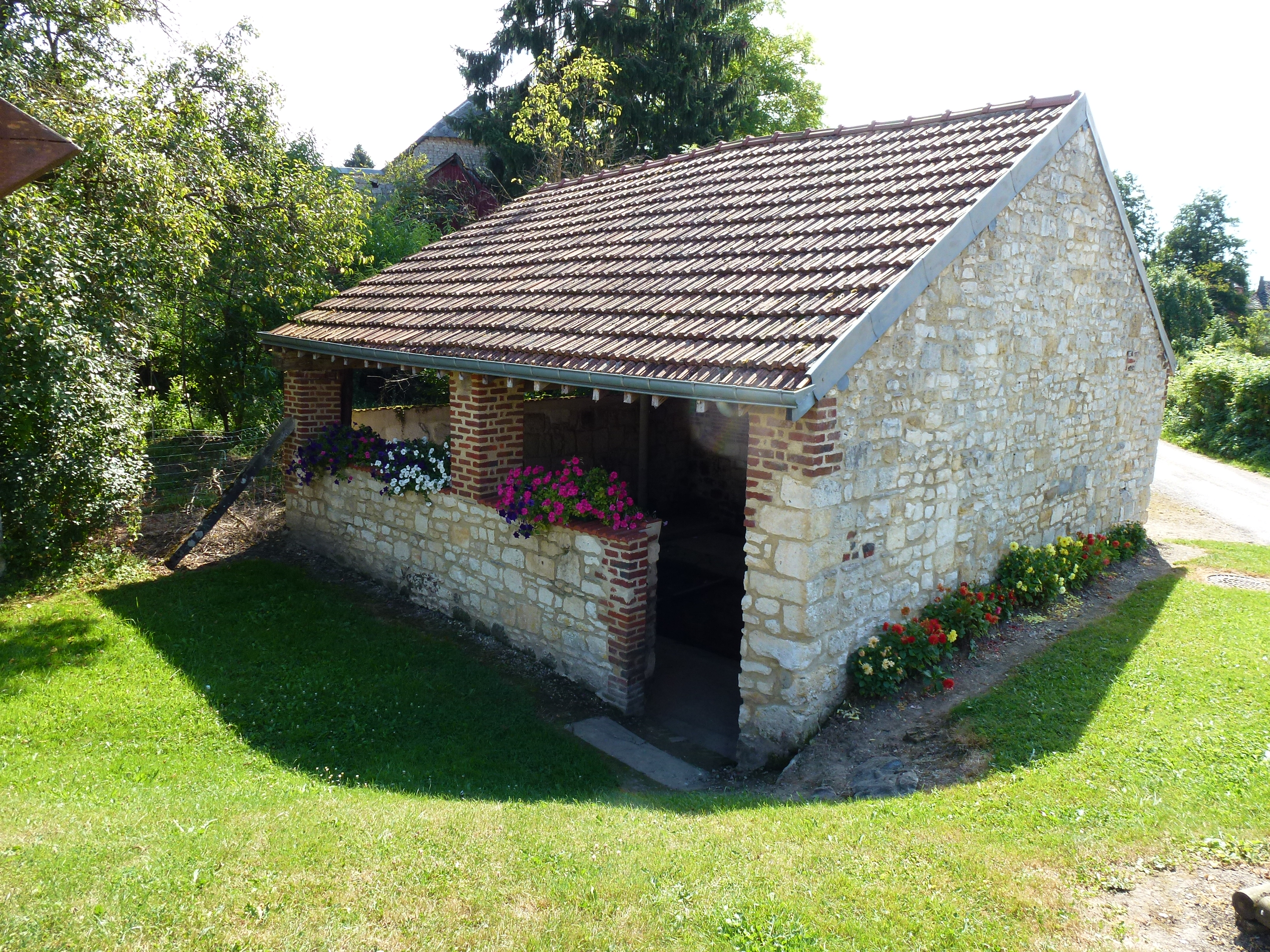
Aouste Lavoir

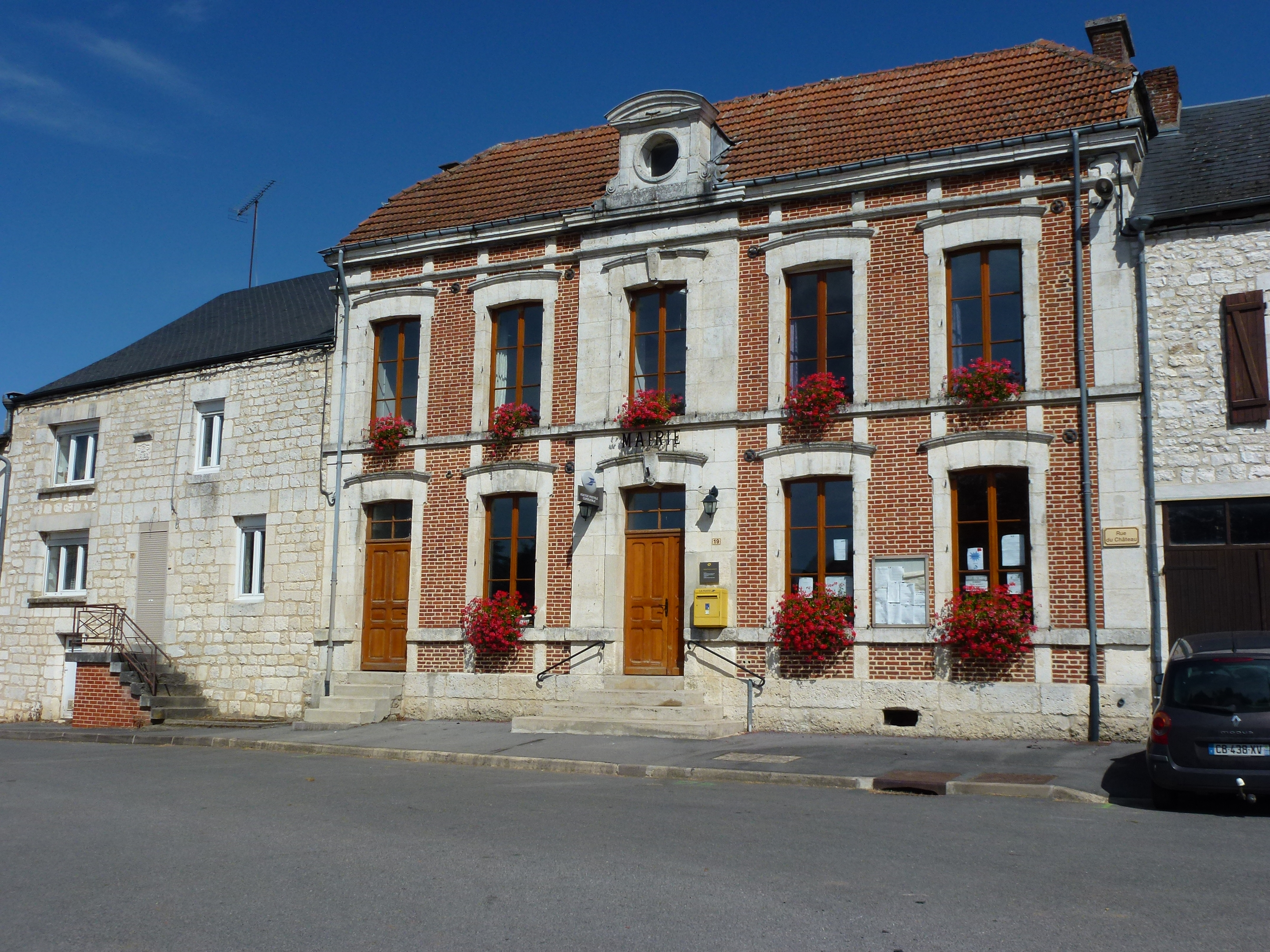
Aouste Town Hall

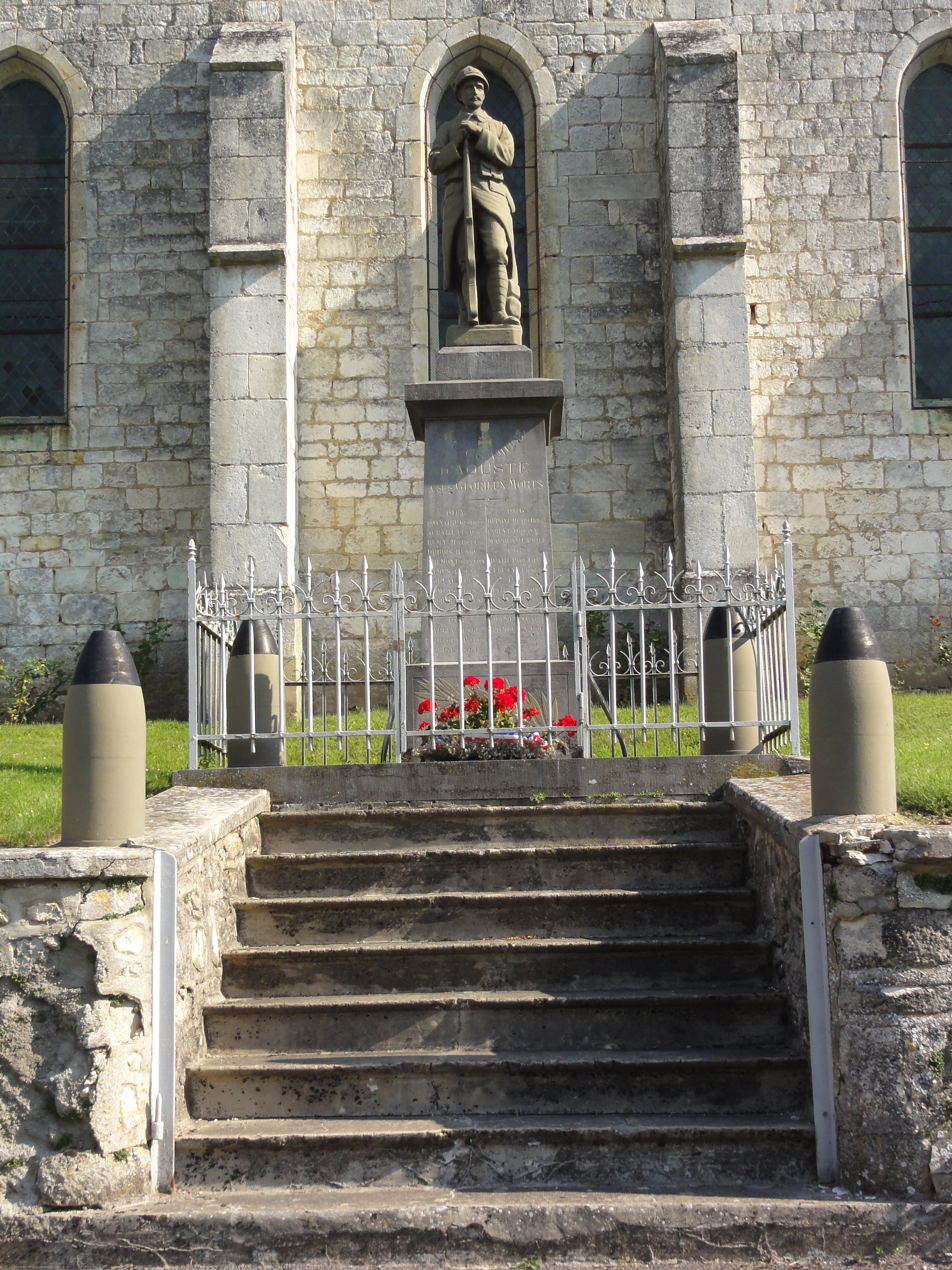
The War Memorial

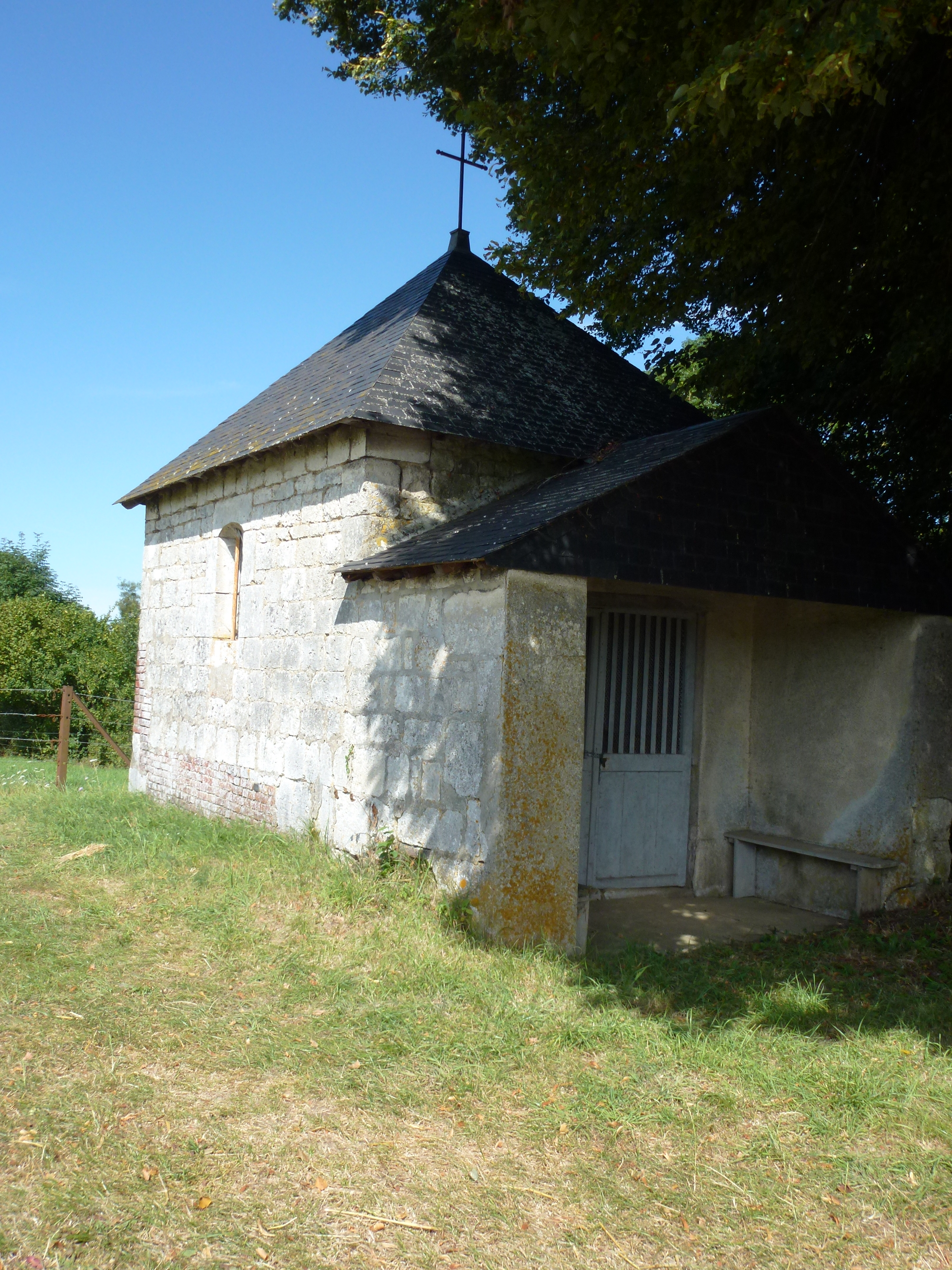
Chapel of Saint Philomene

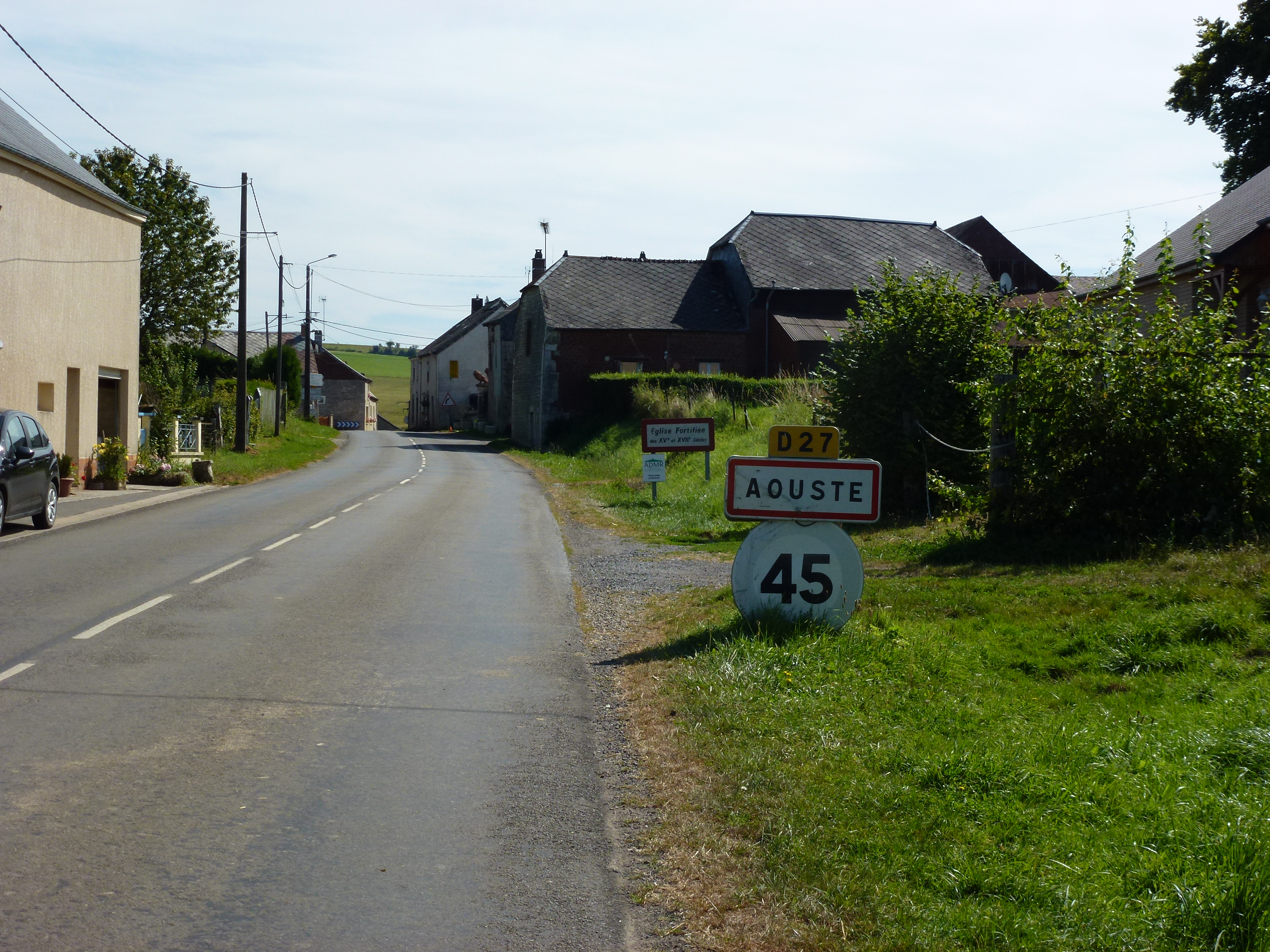
Entrance to the village

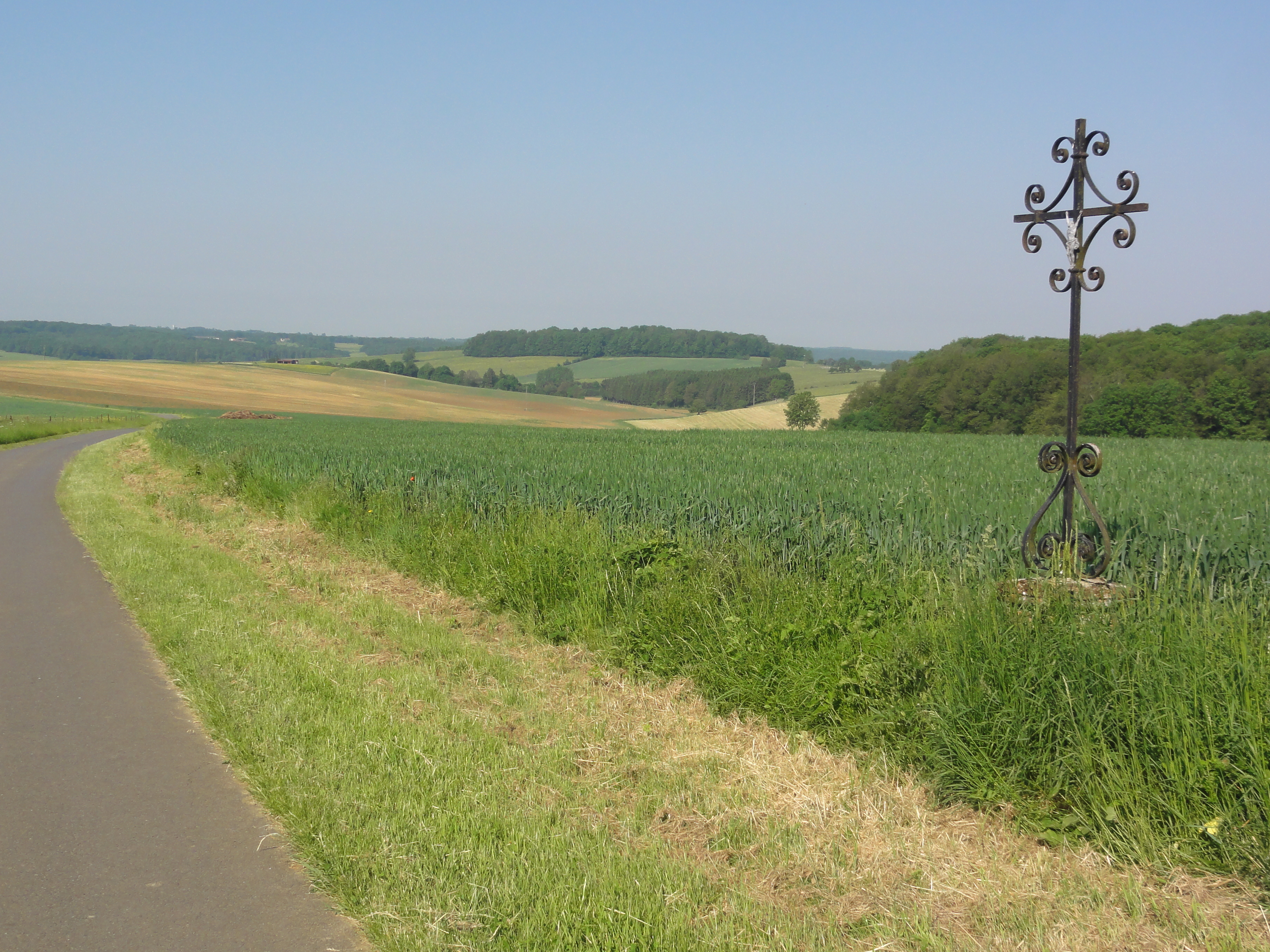
Wayside Cross at Aouste

== See also ==
- Communes of the Ardennes department

=== External links ===
- Aouste on the National Geographic Institute website (in French)
- Aouste on Géoportail, National Geographic Institute (IGN) website (in French)
- Aoufte on the 1750 Cassini Map
