= Garron DuPree =

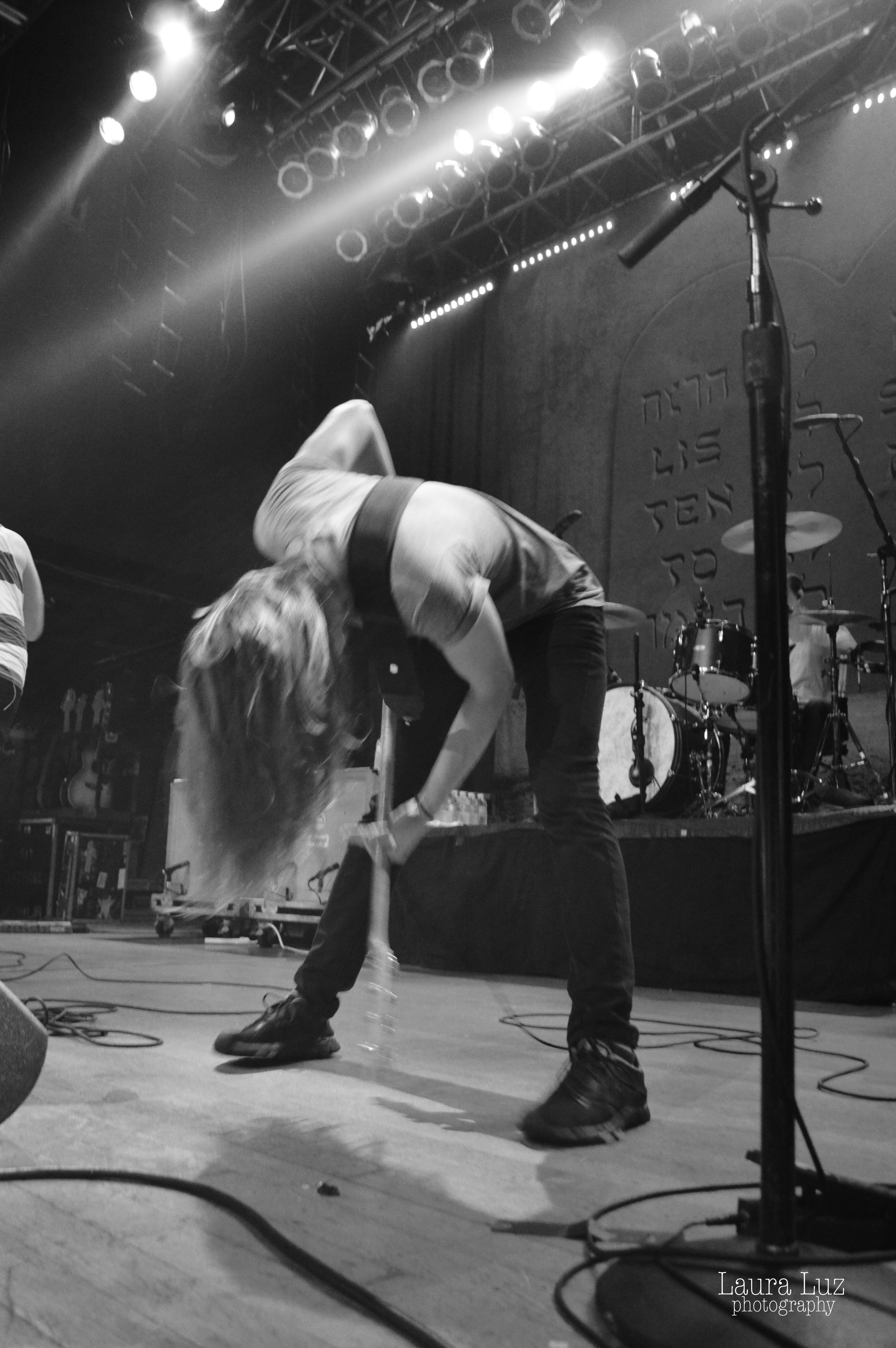
- Garron DuPree Live with Say Anything, Summer 2014

Background information
- Born: December 4, 1989 (age 35); Houston, Texas
- Genres: Indie rock, indie pop
- Occupation(s): Musician, bassist, guitarist, songwriter, recording engineer, session musician
- Instrument(s): Bass guitar, guitar
- Years active: 2005–present
- Labels: Equal Vision, Reprise, Record Collection, Warner Bros., Sire, Doghouse, J, RCA Records
- Website: www.garrondupree.com

Garron DuPree (born December 4, 1989) is a bass guitarist and recording engineer from Texas. DuPree began his career as a professional musician in 2005 at the age of 15 as the bassist for the group Eisley, and became the bassist for Say Anything in 2013. DuPree is also a recording engineer as well as a session musician.

== Personal life ==
Garron was born in Houston, TX. and was raised in the surrounding cities of Richmond, and Sugar Land, Texas. He is the second of five children from his mother, Parrish DuPree, and father, Wade DuPree. Surrounded by the more rural environments of Texas, Garron grew up in the countryside owning several horses. He is a self-proclaimed Christian, along with the majority of his family, and grew up participating and playing music at his church in Texas. He married his girlfriend of nearly 10 years, Madeline DuPree, in July, 2014.

== Career ==
Garron DuPree joined the group Eisley in 2005 at the age of 15, following the departure of their former bassist Jonathan Wilson. He is the cousin of the group's remaining members Chauntelle DuPree, Stacy DuPree, Weston DuPree, and Sherri DuPree. At the time of Garron's arrival with the Texas-based indie-pop band, they were entering a phase of heavy touring in support of their debut album Room Noises. Garron toured as Eisley's bassist beginning with the group's 2005 Yahoo sponsored "Who's Next?" tour, followed closely by 2005's Austin City Limits festival and closing out the year with Switchfoot's Nothing Is Sound tour. Eisley continued touring throughout 2006, visiting Australia in support of Taking Back Sunday, touring the United States with supporting band Dawes for their first major headlining tour, as well as touring Europe. Garron's bass work with Eisley began on their second full-length record, Combinations, and has remained the sole bassist on the remainder of Eisley's recordings to date. In 2013, Garron expanded his repertoire when he joined Say Anything as their bassist, replacing touring bassist Adam Siska. His bass work has been said to be inspired by Radiohead, Kent, Pink Floyd, the Beatles, and Matt Rubano, among others.

DuPree has additionally become known as a recording engineer in more recent years, beginning commercially with his work on Eisley's fourth studio LP, Currents. Most notably, he is known for his engineering work on that album, as well as Merriment's debut album, Sway, and Say Anything's sixth studio album Hebrews.

=== Currents 2012-2013 ===
DuPree began work alongside Eisley band member Weston DuPree and technician Mark Schwartzkopf in the design and building of Eisley's own studio after the group's departure from Warner Brothers Records in 2011. The studio was designed, in early 2012, and construction began that April. Upon its completion, the group immediately began the production and recording of their fourth full-length record.

Production continued throughout the remainder of the year, marking Eisley's most extensive length of time spent recording a single album since their inception. Production was paused once, to accommodate the group's Mid-Summer Tour in June–July 2012. The recording process was finished by late October 2012, and final arrangements were completed before mix engineer and multi-instrumentalist Jeremy Larson mixed and mastered the album. Currents was released on May 28, 2013 to almost unanimously positive reviews - peaking at #66 on the Billboard 200 charts, making it the group's highest charting album to date.

=== Sway 2013 ===
Following the recording of Currents, Garron was brought in to engineer the debut album by the group Merriment. The record was produced by Charlie Brand, front-man for the indie-pop group Miniature Tigers. Production of the record was completed within two weeks, and was recorded at Eisley's studio in Tyler, TX. DuPree was credited as Engineer for the album, and also contributed his bass guitar skills on the track "Patterns." He also performed the strings on the track "Right Again."

Sway was released on April 8, 2014. The record reached #3 on the iTunes singer-songwriter charts, and received generally positive reviews for the band's debut release.

=== Hebrews 2013-2014 ===
Hebrews, the sixth studio album by American pop-punk band Say Anything, was recorded and engineered by DuPree in Tyler, TX throughout late 2013 and early 2014. DuPree also is credited for all of the bass work on the album. DuPree officially joined Say Anything as a bassist in 2013 and quickly adapted to a more punk-rock influenced role. DuPree also embarked on tour with the group in summer 2014 in support of Hebrews. The tour was included openers The Front Bottoms, the So-So Glo's, and You Blew It!, and was said to be among the group's most successful tours to date.

DuPree's work on Hebrews represents his first recorded venture into the indie-punk/pop-punk style characterized by Say Anything. Previously Garron's work was focused on the more whimsical style of his primary work in Eisley, featuring slower, more melodically focused bass rhythms working in tandem with the accent-rich drumming of the group.

=== Touring ===
According to Garron's official website, he played "over 600 live shows, in over 340 venues, across 166 different cities, in 4 different countries" as of 2015. In 2014, DuPree embarked on a headlining tour with Say Anything in support of their album Hebrews. Joining Say Anything on stage as touring members were ex-Taking Back Sunday member Fred Mascherino, Moneen frontman Kenny Bridges, and Moving Mountains frontman Greg Dunn. Coincidentally, Garron had toured with each of these additional musicians separately during his extensive touring with Eisley.

== Discography ==
Year	Title	Artist	Role	Record label
2006	Final Noise E.P.	Eisley	Bassist	Reprise Records
2007	Combinations	Eisley	Bassist	Reprise Records
2007	Like the Actors E.P.	Eisley	Bassist	Reprise Records
2009	Fire Kite E.P.	Eisley	Bassist	Sire Records
2011	The Valley	Eisley	Bassist	Equal Vision
2012	Deep Space E.P.	Eisley	Bassist	Equal Vision
2013	Currents	Eisley	Bassist, Recording Engineer	Equal Vision
2014	Hebrews	Say Anything	Bassist, Recording Engineer	Equal Vision
2014	Sway	Merriment	Recording Engineer, Add. Bassist, Add. Strings	Rory Records
2012	Vital	Anberlin	Add. Recording Engineer (uncredited)	Universal Republic
2012	Knock Out (Single)	Perma	Recording Engineer, Mixing, Mastering	Rory Records
2014	(Don't Ever) Let Me Go	Tolmé	Bassist	Independent
2014	David Upp	David Upp	Recording Engineer	Independent
2014	Crimson Arrow	Crimson Arrow	Recording Engineer	Independent
2014	Hebrews	Say Anything	Recording Engineer, Editing	Equal Vision
2014	...Is A Real Boy Acoustic	Say Anything	Recording Engineer, Mixing, Mastering	Equal Vision
2015	Sidewalk Portals	Ella Nightingale	Producer, Mixing, Mastering, Bass, Add. Instrumentation	Independent
2015	Live	MUMC	Editor	Independent
2015	TBA	Andrew Ross	Engineer, Mix Engineer	Independent
2016		Merriment	Engineer, Mix Engineer	Independent
2016	I Don't Think It Is	Say Anything	Bassist	Equal Vision
2017	I'm Only Dreaming	Eisley	Bassist, Guitarist, Keyboards, Add.	Equal Vision
2018	Rooster	Karate Chop	Producer, Recording Engineer, Mixing, Mastering	Independent

Music Videos

Year	Title	Artist	Director
2005	I Wasn't Prepared (Feat. Amber Heard)	Eisley	Marvin Jarrett
2007	Memories	Eisley	Cory Sheldon
2007	Invasion	Eisley	Miranda Penn Turin
2011	Smarter	Eisley	Chris Phelps
2011	The Valley	Eisley	Cory Sheldon
2013	Currents	Eisley	Darren King
2016	Give a Damn	Say Anything	Israel Anthem
2017	Louder Than A Lion	Eisley	Israel Anthem
2017	Always Wrong	Eisley	Israel Anthem

Charting Album Positions and Credits

Year	Artist	Album	Chart positions						Credits
Year	Artist	Album	Billboard 200	Top Christian Albums	US Alternative Albums	US Indie	US Rock Albums	Tastemakers	Credits
2007	Eisley	Combinations: Released August 14, 2007; Label: Reprise	70	–	23	-	23	10	Bass Guitar
2011	Eisley	The Valley: Released March 1, 2011; Label: Equal Vision	80	–	15	12	20	-	Bass Guitar
2012	Anberlin	Vital: Released October 16, 2012; Label: Universal Republic	16	1	3	-	6	22	Additional Audio Engineering (uncredited)
2013	Eisley	Currents: Released May 28, 2013; Label: Equal Vision	66	-	17	11	22	-	Bass Guitar; Audio Engineer; Audio Editor
2014	Say Anything	Hebrews: Released June 10, 2014; Label: Equal Vision	37	-	7	9	-	-	Bass Guitar; Audio Engineer; Audio Editor
2016	Say Anything	I Don't Think It Is: Released February 26, 2016; Label: Equal Vision	-	-	-	22	35	-	Bass Guitar
2017	Eisley	I'm Only Dreaming: Released February 17, 2016; Label: Equal Vision	69	-	-	8	15	-	Bass Guitar; Guitar; Keyboards
