= Loner (EP) =

EP by Sucré
- Released: September 2, 2014
- Recorded: 2014
- Genre: Alternative pop
- Length: 15:00
- Label: Red Velvet
- Producer: Jeremy Larson, Darren King

Sucré chronology
A Minor Bird (2012)	Loner (2014)

Loner is the first EP for side project of Eisley member Stacy DuPree King, her husband and drummer for Mutemath Darren King, and Jeremy Larson. The album was released digitally on iTunes in September, 2014.

== Reception ==
The release received many positive reviews; HelloGiggles said it "perfectly flows from one song to the next." Interview Magazine spoke with Stacy and said of her about the release and noted, "King has spent the majority of her life surrounded by a wealth of creativity that has inevitably shaped and nurtured her own musical identity.

== Track listing ==
No.	Title	Length
1.	"Wandering Back"	1:25
2.	"Young and Free"	3:33
3.	"Loner"	3:28
4.	"Crazy"	2:53
5.	"Line of Fire"	4:03
Total length:		15:00
