= I'm Only Dreaming =

Studio album by Eisley
- Released: February 17, 2017
- Recorded: June–July 2016
- Studios: Tyler, Texas
- Genres: Indie pop, shoegaze
- Length: 44:58
- Label: Equal Vision
- Producers: Eisley, Will Yip

Eisley chronology
Currents (2013)	I'm Only Dreaming (2017)

Professional ratings
Aggregate scores
Source	Rating
Metacritic	72%
Review scores
Source	Rating
Alternative Press	3.5/5 stars
PopMatters	4/5 stars
Rock Sound	3.5/5 stars
The A.V. Club	2.9 stars on a 5 point scale

I'm Only Dreaming is the fifth full-length album by the band Eisley. It was released on February 17, 2017, on Equal Vision Records. The album was produced by notable producer Will Yip, and marked the band's first release following the departure of several original members, leaving cousins Sherri DuPree-Bemis, and Garron DuPree as the core members of the group for the first time. In September 2016, the band released their first song in over three years, "Defeatist", which marked the first song to be heard from the album. Dupree-Bemis mentioned via an interview that "Defeatist", along with several others from the album, were written predominately by Garron.

The album charted at number 69 on the Billboard 200, number 8 on the US Indie, number 15 on US Rock, and number 20 on Top Vinyl records – making it the group's highest-charting album to date in several categories.

== Production (June–July 2016) ==
The group began production of their fifth studio album with Will Yip in June 2016 at the house of singer Sherri DuPree-Bemis, and Say Anything frontman Max Bemis, in their hometown of Tyler, TX. The recording of this album marked the first time that Yip left his studio in Conshohocken, Pennsylvania, Studio 4 to produce a record. The album saw the group return to some of their pop-sensibility, featuring a more guitar-driven approach at the hands of Garron DuPree, and signature whimsical vocal style of DuPree-Bemis. The band's original drummer, Weston, recorded all drums for the album, though had no intentions to tour the record following his official departure from the band in 2015 to focus on family. The album concluded its production in early July 2016.

== Title ==
During an interview with Garron, it was said that the album was named after The Beatles song "I'm Only Sleeping", citing heavy influence from the band during the creation of I'm Only Dreaming. The band's debut record Room Noises was named as a reference to Pet Sounds, making the reference to The Beatles in-line with their early work. Dupree said of the title, "It felt like a lucid dream, one that I was afraid that I might wake up from, but I didn’t want lose that feeling. So I’m Only Dreaming sort of captured some of that hope, fear, and joy that I felt while making the record."

== Track listing ==
No.	Title	Length
1.	"Always Wrong"	3:57
2.	"Defeatist"	3:31
3.	"A Song for the Birds"	4:01
4.	"Sparking"	3:45
5.	"My Best Friend"	4:07
6.	"Rabbit Hole"	3:58
7.	"Louder Than a Lion"	3:56
8.	"You Are Mine"	4:26
9.	"When You Fall"	4:04
10.	"Snowfall"	4:36
11.	"Brightest Fire"	4:37
Total length:		44:58

== Personnel ==
=== Songwriting ===
- Sherri DuPree-Bemis
- Garron DuPree
- Will Yip

=== Instrumentation ===
- Sherri DuPree-Bemis – vocals
- Garron DuPree – bass, guitar, keyboards
- Weston DuPree – drums
- Max Bemis – additional vocals
- Anthony Green – vocals ("Louder Than a Lion")
- Christie DuPree – additional background vocals
- Will Yip – additional percussion

=== Production ===
- Will Yip – production, engineering, mixing
- Ryan Smith – mastering
