= Always Wrong =

Always Wrong may refer to:

- "Always Wrong", song by Neurotic Outsiders
- "Always Wrong", song from Eisley discography
- "Always Wrong", song by S-X (producer)
