= French classical music =

French classical music began with the sacred music of the Roman Catholic Church, with written records predating the reign of Charlemagne. It includes all of the major genres of sacred and secular, instrumental and vocal music. French classical styles often have an identifiably national character, ranging from the clarity and precision of the music of the late Renaissance music to the sensitive and emotional Impressionistic styles of the early 20th century. Important French composers include Pérotin, Machaut, Du Fay, Ockeghem, Josquin, Lully, Charpentier, Couperin, Rameau, Leclair, Grétry, Méhul, Auber, Berlioz, Alkan, Gounod, Offenbach, Franck, Lalo, Saint-Saëns, Delibes, Bizet, Chabrier, Massenet, Widor, Fauré, d'Indy, Chausson, Debussy, Dukas, Vierne, Duruflé, Satie, Roussel, Hahn, Ravel, Honegger, Milhaud, Poulenc, Auric, Messiaen, Françaix, Dupré, Dutilleux, Xenakis, Boulez, Guillou, Grisey, and Murail.

== Definition ==
Classical music usually refers to music produced in, or rooted in the traditions of Western liturgical and secular music, encompassing a broad period from roughly the 9th century to present times. The central norms of this tradition became codified between approximately 1600 and 1900, which is known as the common practice period.

Classical music, including that from France is largely distinguished from many other non-European and popular musical forms by its system of staff notation, in use since about the 16th century. Western staff notation is used by composers to prescribe to the performer the pitch, speed, meter, individual rhythms and exact execution of a piece of music. This leaves less room for practices, such as improvisation and ad libitum ornamentation, that are frequently heard in non-European art music (compare Indian classical music and Japanese traditional music), and popular music.

== History ==
During the early Christian era of the Middle Ages, sacred monophonic (only one voice) chant was the dominant form of music, followed by a sacred polyphonic (multi-voices) organum. By the thirteenth century, another polyphonic style called the motet became popular. During the Ars Nova era of the thirteenth and fourteenth centuries, the trend towards writing polyphonic music extended to non-Church music. In the fifteenth century, more secular music emerged, such as the French chanson.

In the late sixteenth-century, composers attempted to recreate Greek drama using a style called monody. In the seventeenth century, Italian opera styles such as opera seria, opera buffa were very important. This Italian opera was taken up in France, where Lully developed a French national opera style. In the seventeenth century, instrumental music developed a great deal, and vocal music was usually accompanied by a written bassline called the basso continuo. Instrumental works included keyboard suites, which were based on dance suites, sonatas, organ music, and music for small groups (trio sonatas) or orchestra (e.g., sinfonias and concerto grossos). Baroque music from the eighteenth century moved towards a simpler, lighter style of instrumental music. Later in the eighteenth century, the Classical style dominated, with the main forms being sonatas, symphonies, and string quartets.

The nineteenth century is often called the Romantic era. During this era, the symphony developed, and a new style of music called "program music" (music that tells a story) developed. Other types of music that became important in the nineteenth century were grand opera, small pieces for piano; piano sonatas, often with the exploration of new harmonic or tonal ideas. In the late Romantic era, the Austro-German tradition of Wagner dominated musical composition. Composers began exploring different, looser approaches to tonality (the key-centered-ness of a piece of music). During this era, French composers such as Debussy and Ravel developed a style called Impressionism, which emphasized tone "colours", and which used chords purely for their sound (as opposed to for their harmonic role).

During the twentieth-century, composers took many different paths. Some composers looked backwards to the light, elegant Classical works, with the Neoclassicism of the Russian-French composer Stravinsky. Austro-German composers such as Schoenberg and Berg and used a tortured, dramatic style called Expressionism. The French composer Boulez abandoned the entire tonal (key-centered) tradition of Western music with a style called Serialism. Other composers explored electronic music (Stockhausen); chance-based or random (aleatoric) music and indeterminacy (Cage); and minimalism (Reich, Glass).
