= William Dupree =

William Dupree may refer to:

- Sir William Dupree, 1st Baronet (1856–1933), English brewer
- William Dupree (bobsleigh) (1909–1955), American bobsledder
- William Jedediah Dupree (born 1979), American fencer

== See also ==
- Dupree (surname)
