= The Best Worst-Case Scenario =

Studio album by Fair
- Released: June 6, 2006
- Genre: Indie rock, Indie pop
- Length: 44:52
- Label: Tooth & Nail Records
- Producer: Aaron Sprinkle and Fair

Fair chronology
| The Best Worst-Case Scenario (2006) | Disappearing World (2010) |

Professional ratings
Review scores
| Source | Rating |
|---|---|
| Allmusic | 3.5/5 stars |
| Absolute Punk | 9.5/10 stars |
| Christian Music Today | 3.5/5 stars |
| CMCentral | (9.3/10) |
| Emotional Punk | 8/10 stars |
| Jesus Freak Hideout | 4/5 stars |

The Best Worst-Case Scenario is the first album released by Tooth & Nail Records alternative rock band Fair, which features notable musician and record producer Aaron Sprinkle. The album was released on June 6, 2006.

In 2007, the album artwork, designed by Invisible Creature was nominated for a Grammy Award for Best Recording Packaging.

== Track listing ==
All songs written by Erick Newbill and Aaron Sprinkle, except "Grab your Coat", written by Nick Barber and Sprinkle.

1. "Monday" – 3:16
2. "The Attic" – 4:03
3. "Carelessness" – 4:22
4. "The Dumbfound Game" – 3:43
5. "Pause" – 4:13
6. "Grab Your Coat" – 2:16
7. "Bide My Crime" – 3:04
8. "Get You Out Alive" – 4:06
9. "Cut Down Sideways" – 3:47
10. "Confidently Dreaming" – 3:32
11. "Blurry Eyed" – 3:16
12. "Unglued" – 5:14

== Album credits ==
- Produced and Recorded by Aaron Sprinkle and Fair
- Mixed by J.R. McNeely
- Recorded and mixed at Compound Recording, Seattle
- Background vocals on "Unglued" recorded at Rosewood Studios, Tyler, TX
- "Pause" was mixed by J.R. McNeely at Paragon Studios, Franklin, TN
- "Grab Your Coat" was mixed by Aaron Sprinkle at Compound Recording.
- Additional recording and mixes assisted by Aaron Lipinski
- Drum Tech: Aaron Mlasko
- Vocals on "Monday" recorded at Randy Torres
- Masted by Troy Glessner at Spectre Mastering
- Joey Sanchez plays Mlasko quality custom drums
- A&R: josh Jeter & Jeff Carver
- Executive producer: Brandon Ebel
- Art direction & Design: Asterik Studio, Seattle
- All Photography by Greg Lutze

== Additional musicians ==
- Sherri & Stacy DuPree (Eisley) - Vocals on "Unglued"
- John Davis - Vocals & Pedal Steel on "Get You Out Alive"
- Brynn Sanchez - Vocals on "The Attic"
- Lars Katz - Acoustic guitars on "Pause" & "Confidently Dreaming"
- Phil Peterson - Cello & Strings Arrangement on "Blurry Eyed"
- Victoria Parker - Violin on "Blurry Eyed"
- Jesse Sprinkle (Aaron's brother) - Vocals on "Blurry Eyed"
- Matt Carter (Emery) - Stomps on "Pause"
