= Telescope Eyes =

Telescope Eyes EP

EP by Eisley
- Released: January 25, 2005
- Genre: indie pop
- Length: 11:17
- Label: Reprise

Eisley chronology
Marvelous Things E.P. (2003)	Telescope Eyes EP (2005)	Room Noises (2005)

Telescope Eyes E.P. is an EP of the band Eisley released January 25, 2005 on Reprise Records.

== Track listing ==
All songs written by Eisley.

No.	Title	Length
1.	"Telescope Eyes"	3:03
2.	"Vintage People (Demo)"	2:54
3.	"Tree Tops (Demo)"	5:20
Total length:		11:17
