= A Minor Bird =

Studio album by Sucré
- Released: April 10, 2012
- Recorded: 2010–2011
- Genre: Indie pop
- Length: 38:55
- Label: Red Velvet
- Producer: Jeremy Larson, Darren King

Sucré chronology
A Minor Bird (2012)	Loner (2014)

Singles from A Minor Bird
- 1. "When We Were Young" Released: February 24, 2012

Professional ratings
Review scores
Source	Rating
Absolutepunk.net	9.5

A Minor Bird is the debut album for the side project of Eisley member Stacy DuPree King, her husband and drummer for Mutemath Darren King, and Jeremy Larson. The album was produced at Jeremy Larson's studio in Springfield, Missouri.

== Release ==
It was initially issued on CD, vinyl, and digitally in a "Limited Edition Red Velvet Package". The package included one vinyl, access to a downloadable version of the album via email, an instant download of the single "When We Were Young", one 18x24 Paper Doll Poster, four 4x6 Sucré Lyric Prints, one Sucré Art Print, and a Tote Bag.

== Track listing ==
No.	Title	Length
1.	"Hiding Out"	3:29
2.	"When We Were Young"	3:00
3.	"Troubled Waters"	3:56
4.	"Light Up"	2:33
5.	"Chemical Reaction"	5:08
6.	"Say Something"	4:04
7.	"Endless Sleep"	3:17
8.	"No Return"	4:18
9.	"Persuasion"	3:22
10.	"Stampede"	2:59
11.	"The Cliff Waltz"	2:54
Total length:		38:55

== Personnel ==
- Stacy King - Performer
- Darren King - Performer, producer
- Jeremy Larson - Performer, engineer, mixer
- Sarah Reno - French horn, trumpet, tenor horn (1, 4-8, 10, 11)
- Artwork by Ryan Strong
- Photography by Elsie Larson
