= Sherri DuPree =

American singer

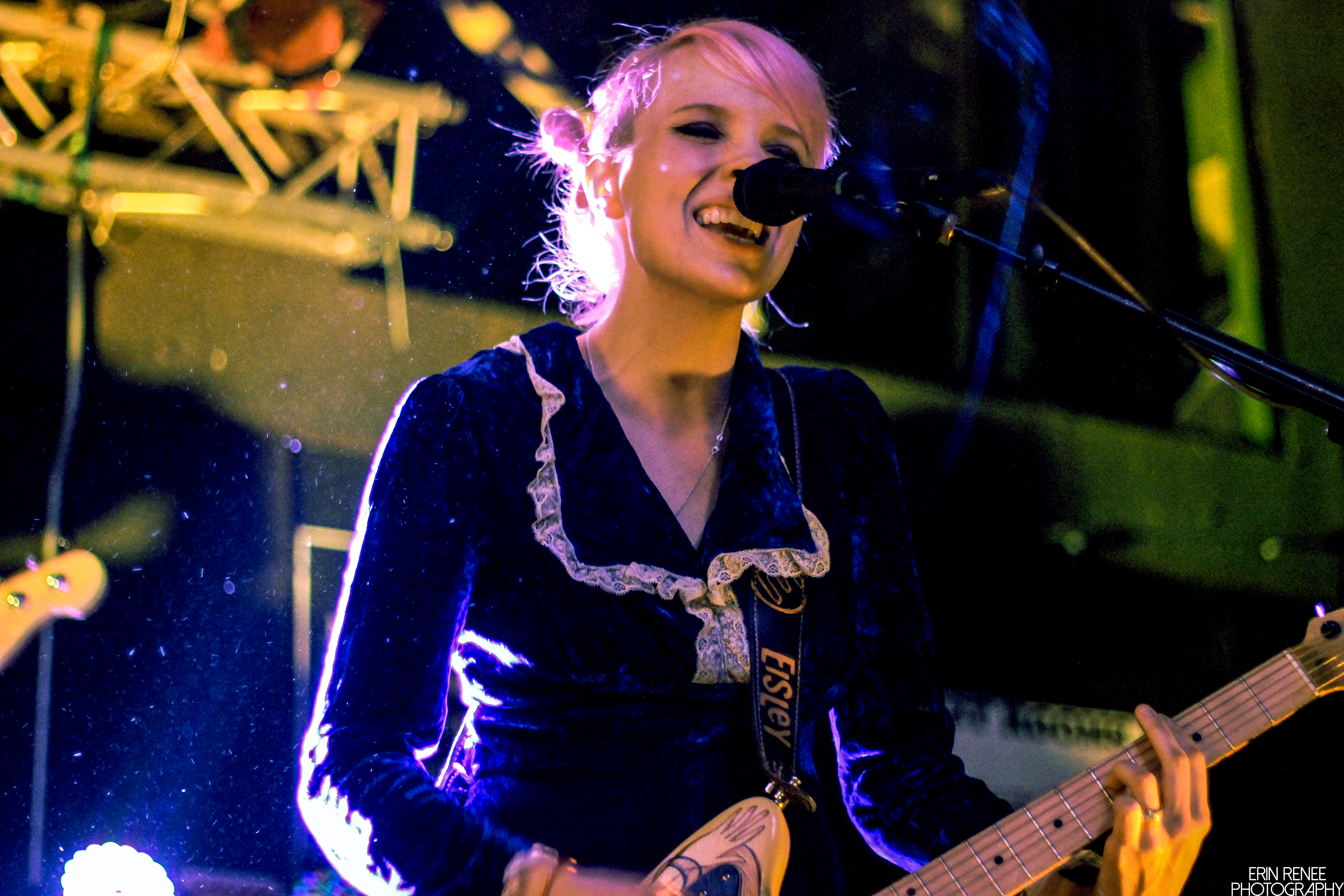
- Sherri Dupree performing in 2014

Background information
- Also known as: Sherri DuPree-Bemis
- Born: Sherri DuPree; December 3, 1983 (age 42); Tyler, Texas, United States
- Genres: Indie rock; indie pop
- Occupations: Musician; singer; songwriter; guitarist
- Instruments: Vocals; guitar
- Years active: 1997–present
- Labels: Equal Vision; Reprise; Record Collection; Warner Bros.; Sire
- Member of: Eisley; Perma
- Spouses: Chad Gilbert (m. 2007; div. 2007); Max Bemis (m. 2009; sep. 2025)
- Website: eisley.com
- Children: 5

Sherri DuPree (born December 3, 1983) is a musician, singer, songwriter and guitarist. She is one of the primary vocalists and songwriters for the band Eisley. DuPree is also a guest vocalist for many other projects, as well as a visual artist.

== Career ==
Three of her siblings, Chauntelle, Stacy, and Weston DuPree, were also members of Eisley, along with her cousin, Garron DuPree. Her youngest sister Christie has also occasionally performed with them live. After the departure of her siblings, DuPree became Eisley's primary singer and songwriter. Her drawings can be seen on much of the Eisley merchandise, as well as on most of their album artwork. DuPree appears on various songs with sister Stacy, including "Dance Party Plus" by Head Automatica and "Unglued" by Fair. Stacy and Sherri contributed vocals to the album Cassadaga by Bright Eyes while in Malibu for the recording of their second full-length album, Combinations. DuPree also sang a verse for a song on Brighten's album King vs. Queen, and she sings during the Two Tongues track "Interlude" on the supergroup's self-titled 2009 album, as well as the second interlude on their second LP. DuPree first contributed vocals to tracks on Say Anything's self-titled album and has since been featured every subsequent album by the band. She is the co-singer-songwriter of the band Perma, with Max Bemis of the band Say Anything.

== Personal life ==
DuPree married musician Chad Gilbert of the band New Found Glory in February 2007. They divorced later that year, after Gilbert had an affair with Hayley Williams, the lead singer for the band Paramore.

DuPree then married musician Max Bemis of the band Say Anything on April 4, 2009. In February 2013, Bemis announced the birth of their first child, Lucy. Their second child was born in February 2015. Their third child was born in April 2018. On April 6, 2020, DuPree gave birth to their fourth child. Their fifth child was born on July 4, 2021. DuPree announced the couple's separation on March 31, 2025.

== Discography ==
Eisley

- Room Noises (2005)
- Combinations (2007)
- The Valley (2011)
- Currents (2013)
- I'm Only Dreaming (2017)

Perma

- Two of a Crime (2013)
- Fight Fair (2019)
