= Deep Space (EP) =

Deep Space EP

EP by Eisley
- Released: February 14, 2012
- Recorded: 2011, at Sherri and Chauntelle DuPree's home, Tyler, Texas
- Genre: Indie Pop
- Length: 19:26
- Label: Equal Vision Records
- Producer: Eisley

Eisley chronology
The Valley (2011)	Deep Space EP (2012)	Currents (2013)

Professional ratings
Review scores
Source	Rating
Absolute Punk	90%

Deep Space is an EP of the band Eisley, released on February 14, 2012 on Equal Vision Records. Originally the EP was going to contain a few b-sides from The Valley, but the band ultimately decided to record mostly new songs and changed the way of the EP as an anticipation of their fourth full-length album. The song "192 Days" had previously been released in demo form on the band's EP Fire Kite in 2009.

== Track listing ==
All songs written by Eisley.

No.	Title	Length
1.	"Lights Out"	3:31
2.	"Laugh It Off"	4:39
3.	"Deep Space"	3:40
4.	"192 Days"	3:44
5.	"One Last Song"	3:52
Total length:		19:26
