= Sucré (band) =

American indie pop band

- Origin: Texas, United States
- Genres: Indie-pop, dream pop, indie, folk, alternative
- Years active: 2011–present
- Members: Stacy DuPree-King
- Website: www.sucreband.com

Sucré is an American indie pop band formed by the vocalist Stacy King, formerly of Eisley. Her husband, Darren King, produces the music with the multi-instrumentalist and arranger Jeremy Larson. Sucré was formed in 2011 and started touring in 2012. A first single, "When We Were Young", was released in early 2012, and the first album, A Minor Bird, was released on April 10, 2012. The album was released streaming on HelloGiggles on April 9, 2012.

For Valentine's Day 2014, Sucré premiered a music video of "You and Me" (made famous from the Ryan Gosling and Michelle Williams film Blue Valentine) with Nylon magazine. "It's intimate and catchy," Nylon said of King and company's interpretation of the tune.

On August 25, 2014, Sucré released the first original recording in two years with "Young and Free".

== History ==
The first music released by Sucré was a cover version of Fleetwood Mac's "Silver Spring" in 2010. The first shows were on February 6, 2012, at The Hotel Cafe in Los Angeles. and a few earlier shows including Webster Hall in New York City and Bootleg Theater in Los Angeles. In October 2012, King and her husband had a daughter named Scarlett.

Sucré embarked on the first tour shortly after the release of Loner in 2014, performing throughout the midwest and east coast. Sucré headlined shows at Stubb's Jr in Austin and the Marlin Room at Webster Hall during the tour.

== Discography ==
=== Studio albums ===
- A Minor Bird (2012)
- Starkisser (2023)

=== Eps ===
- Loner (2014)
- In Pieces (2019)

=== Singles ===
- "Silver Springs" (2010)
- "When We Were Young" (2012)
- "Inside" (2018)
- "Roof" (2019)
- "Retribution" (2019)
- "Put Down Your Guns" (2019)
- "Devil Land" (2019)
- "Truth or Dare" (2019)
- "Your Records" (2019)
- "Emo" (2019)
- "Why Aren't We Happy" (2019)
- "Permission" (2021)
- "Never" (2021)
- ”Gemini” (2022)
