= La Férée =

- Commune
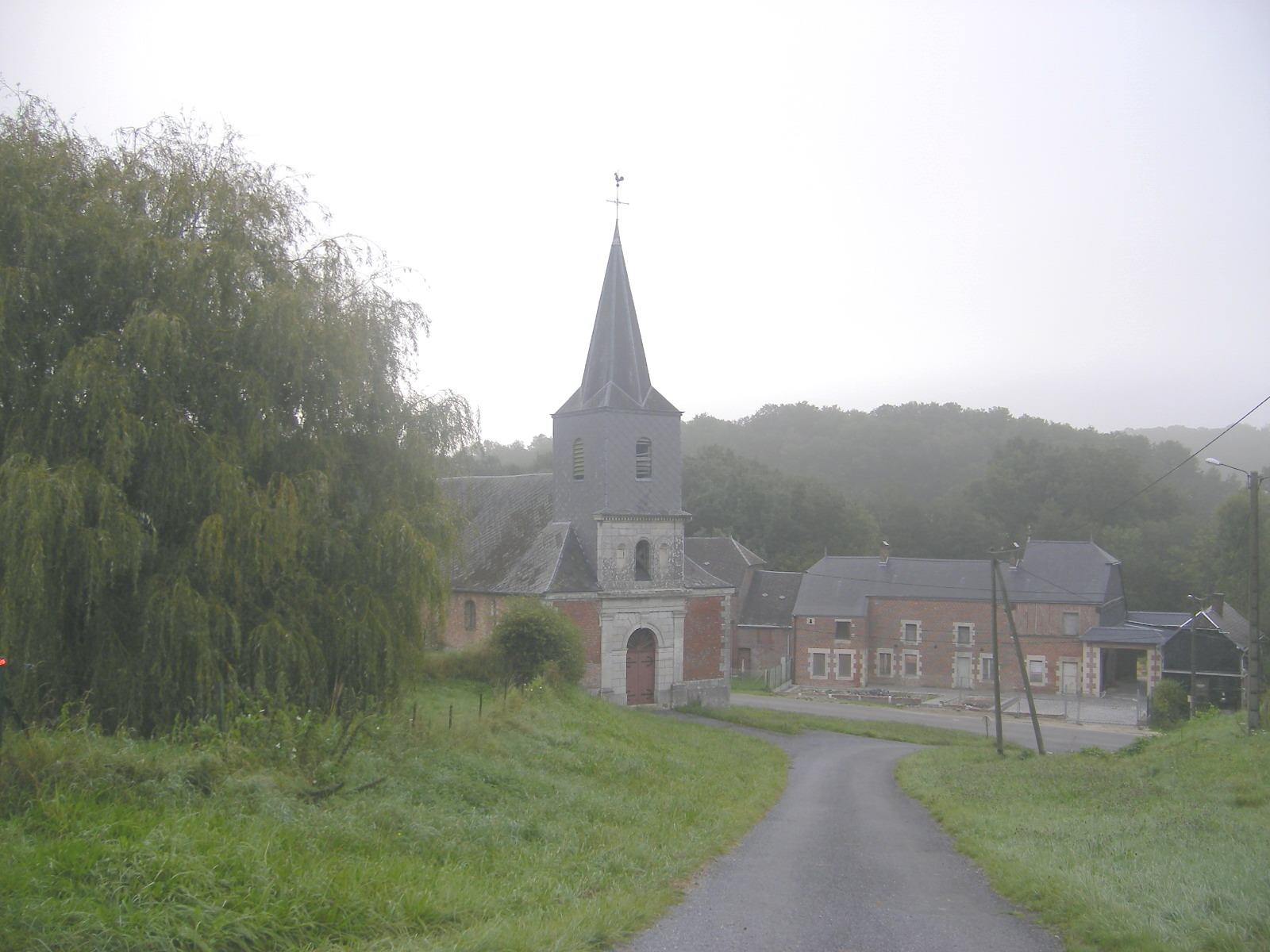
- The church in La Férée
- Location of La Férée
- Location within France Location within Grand Est
- Coordinates: 49°45′50″N 4°18′11″E
- Country: France
- Region: Grand Est
- Department: Ardennes
- Arrondissement: Charleville-Mézières
- Canton: Signy-l'Abbaye

Government
  - Mayor (2020–2026): Michel Chevanne
- Area^{1}: 11.01 km^{2} (4.25 sq mi)
- Elevation: 219 m (719 ft)
- Population (2023): 72
  - Density: 6.5/km^{2} (17/sq mi)
- Time zone: UTC+01:00 (CET)
  - Summer (DST): UTC+02:00 (CEST)
- INSEE/Postal code: 08167 /08290
- ^{1} French Land Register data, which excludes lakes, ponds, glaciers > 1 km^{2} (0.386 sq mi or 247 acres) and river estuaries.

La Férée (French pronunciation: [la feʁe]) is a commune in the Ardennes department in northern France.

== Population ==
Historical population
Year	Pop.	±% p.a.
1968	164	—
1975	124	−3.92%
1982	99	−3.17%
1990	82	−2.33%
1999	71	−1.59%
2007	81	+1.66%
2012	86	+1.21%
2017	83	−0.71%
2023	72	−2.34%
Source: INSEE

== See also ==
- Communes of the Ardennes department
