= Like the Actors =

Like the Actors E.P.

EP by Eisley
- Released: December 18, 2007
- Genre: Indie pop
- Length: 16:49
- Label: Reprise

Eisley chronology
Combinations (2007)	Like the Actors E.P. (2007)	Fire Kite E.P. (2009)

Like the Actors E.P. is an EP of the band Eisley released December 18, 2007 on Reprise Records. The EP contains the proper version of "Sun Feet", as well as B-Sides from Combinations.

== Track listing ==
No.	Title	Length
1.	"Many Funerals (Live from Connect Sessions)"	2:51
2.	"Invasion (Live from Connect Sessions)"	3:35
3.	"Sun Feet"	3:56
4.	"Marsh King's Daughter"	3:45
5.	"Like the Actors"	3:02
Total length:		16:49
