= Liart =

- Commune
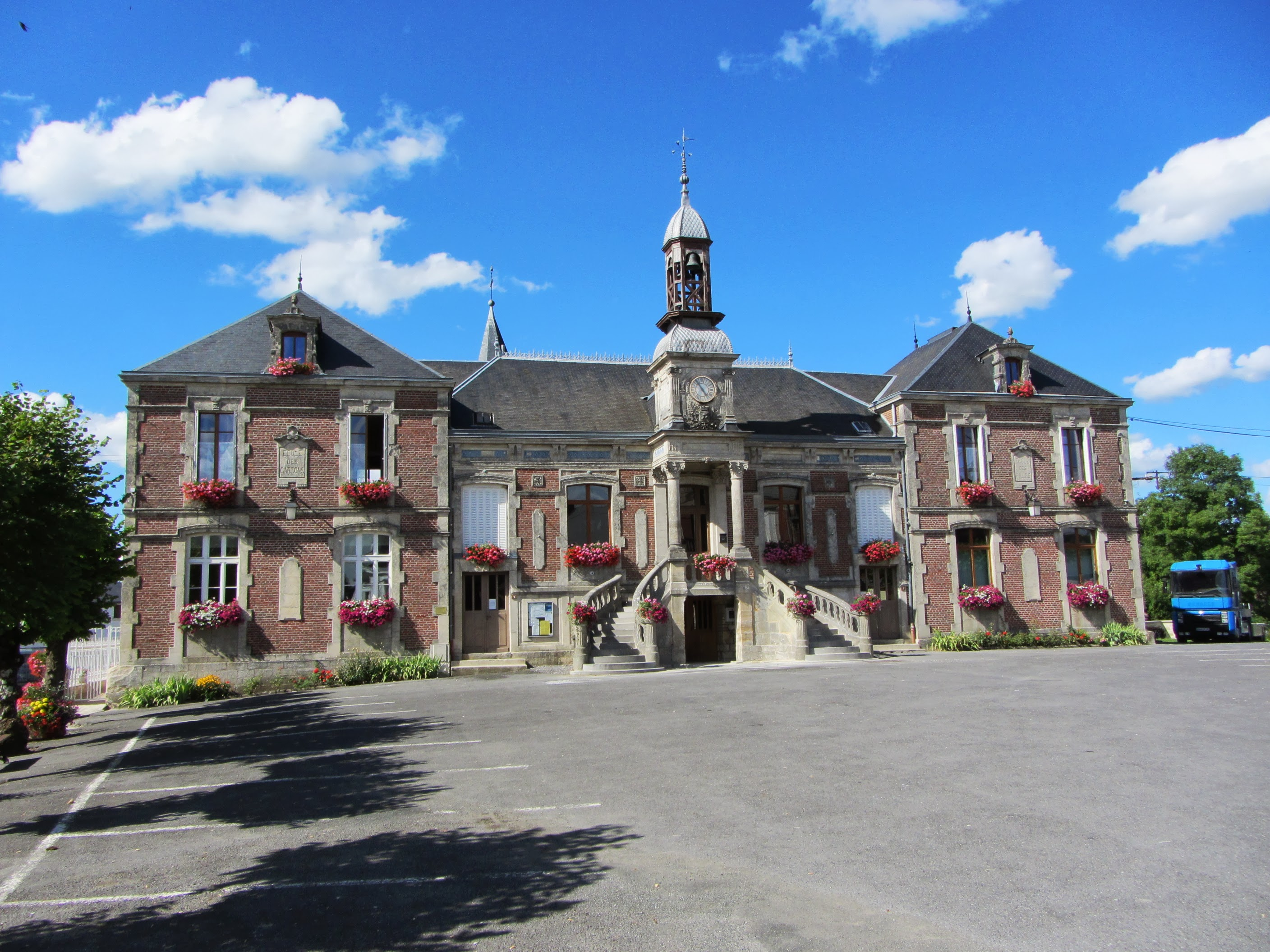
- The town hall in Liart

- Coat of arms
- Location of Liart
- Location within France Location within Grand Est
- Coordinates: 49°46′15″N 4°20′32″E
- Country: France
- Region: Grand Est
- Department: Ardennes
- Arrondissement: Charleville-Mézières
- Canton: Signy-l'Abbaye
- Intercommunality: Ardennes Thiérache

Government
  - Mayor (2024–2026): Jacques Génon
- Area^{1}: 13.44 km^{2} (5.19 sq mi)
- Elevation: 226 m (741 ft)
- Population (2023): 585
  - Density: 43.5/km^{2} (113/sq mi)
- Time zone: UTC+01:00 (CET)
  - Summer (DST): UTC+02:00 (CEST)
- INSEE/Postal code: 08254 /08290
- ^{1} French Land Register data, which excludes lakes, ponds, glaciers > 1 km^{2} (0.386 sq mi or 247 acres) and river estuaries.

Liart (French pronunciation: [ljaʁ]) is a commune in the Ardennes department in northern France.

== Population ==
Historical population
Year	Pop.	±% p.a.
1968	627	—
1975	582	−1.06%
1982	595	+0.32%
1990	587	−0.17%
1999	521	−1.32%
2007	537	+0.38%
2012	548	+0.41%
2017	605	+2.00%
2023	585	−0.56%
Source: INSEE

== See also ==
- Communes of the Ardennes department
