= Prez, Ardennes =

Prez
- Commune
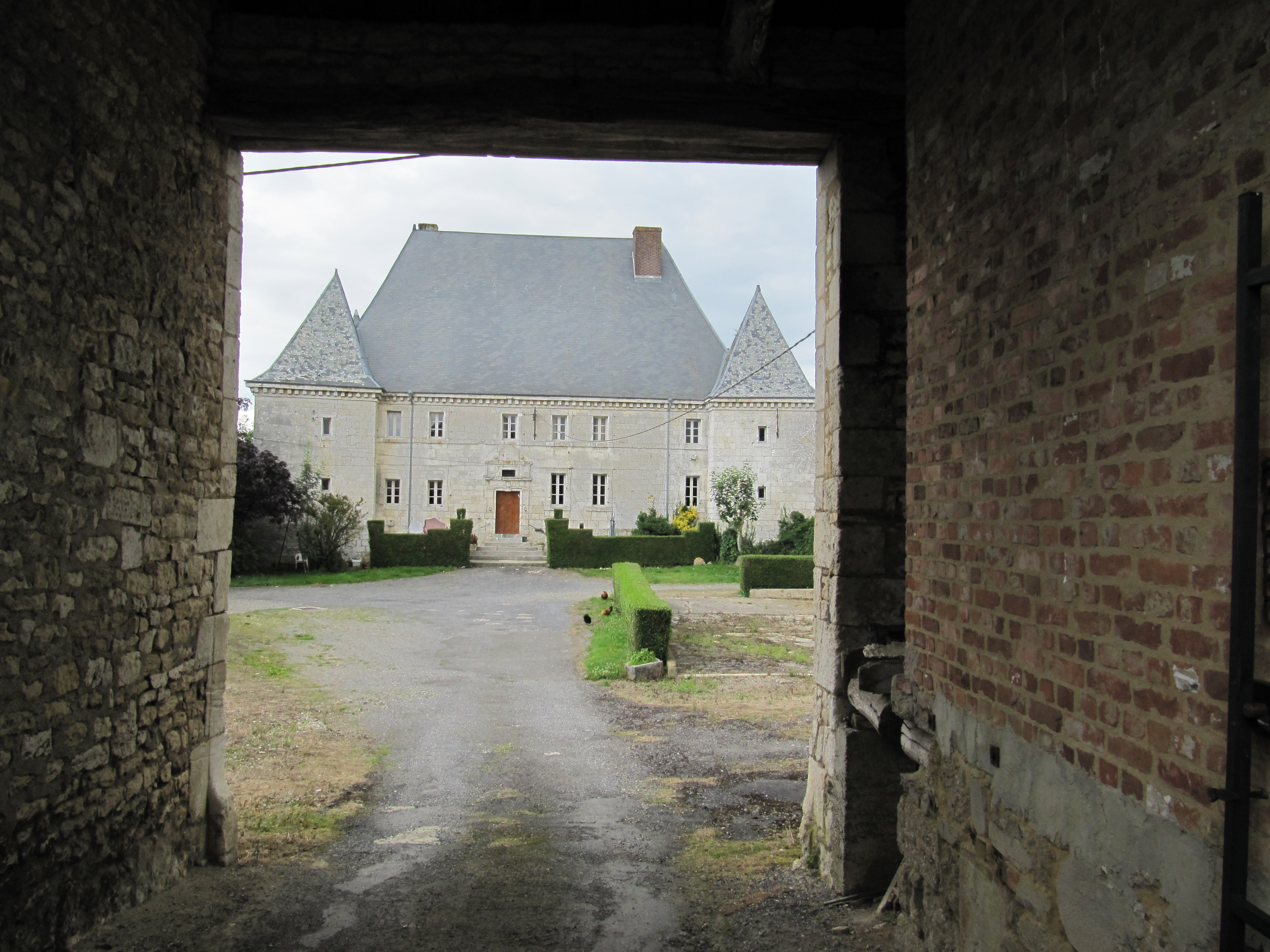
- Farm of Maipas

- Coat of arms
- Location of Prez
- Location within France Location within Grand Est
- Coordinates: 49°48′02″N 4°21′05″E
- Country: France
- Region: Grand Est
- Department: Ardennes
- Arrondissement: Charleville-Mézières
- Canton: Signy-l'Abbaye

Government
  - Mayor (2024–2026): Fabien Grabowecki
- Area^{1}: 12.4 km^{2} (4.8 sq mi)
- Elevation: 220 m (720 ft)
- Population (2023): 133
  - Density: 10.7/km^{2} (27.8/sq mi)
- Time zone: UTC+01:00 (CET)
  - Summer (DST): UTC+02:00 (CEST)
- INSEE/Postal code: 08344 /08290
- ^{1} French Land Register data, which excludes lakes, ponds, glaciers > 1 km^{2} (0.386 sq mi or 247 acres) and river estuaries.

Prez is a commune in the Ardennes department in northern France.

== Population ==
Historical population
Year	Pop.	±% p.a.
1968	168	—
1975	130	−3.60%
1982	137	+0.75%
1990	105	−3.27%
1999	112	+0.72%
2007	139	+2.74%
2012	141	+0.29%
2017	136	−0.72%
2023	133	−0.37%
Source: INSEE

== See also ==
- Communes of the Ardennes department
