= Fair (band) =

American alternative rock band

- Origin: Seattle, Washington, U.S.
- Genres: Alternative rock
- Years active: 2005–2012 (hiatus)
- Label: Tooth & Nail
- Members: Aaron Sprinkle; Erick Newbill; Joey Sanchez; Nick Barber
- Website: fairforever.com

Fair is an American alternative rock band currently signed to Tooth & Nail Records. It was created in 2005 from members of Aaron Sprinkle's touring band – Sprinkle, fellow Poor Old Lu alum Nick Barber, Erick Newbill, and Joey Sanchez.

The band released its debut album, The Best Worst-Case Scenario, in June 2006.

== Members ==
- Aaron Sprinkle – lead vocals, guitar
- Erick Newbill – guitar, vocals
- Joey Sanchez – drums, percussion
- Nick Barber – bass guitar, vocals

== Discography ==
=== Albums ===
| Title | Release date | Label | Chart positions |
| Title | Release date | Label | Top 200 |
|---|---|---|---|
| The Best Worst-Case Scenario | June 6, 2006 | Tooth & Nail Records | — |
| Disappearing World | February 9, 2010 | Tooth & Nail Records | — |
