= Currents (Eisley album) =

Studio album by Eisley
- Released: May 28, 2013
- Recorded: May 5 – October 19, 2012
- Studios: Tyler, Texas
- Genre: Indie pop
- Length: 51:08
- Label: Equal Vision
- Producer: Eisley

Eisley chronology
The Valley (2011)	Currents (2013)	I'm Only Dreaming (2017)

Professional ratings
Aggregate scores
Source	Rating
Metacritic	73%
Review scores
Source	Rating
Alternative Press	3.5/5 stars
The Boston Globe	3/5 stars
AllMusic	3.5/5 stars
Paste Magazine	83%
AbsolutePunk	85%

Currents is the fourth studio album by Eisley. It was released on May 28, 2013 on Equal Vision Records. The title-track song "Currents," is the first official single from the album, and was publicly released on April 23, 2013. On April 16, 2013, Eisley released an online stream of the song "Drink The Water," hosted by Nylon Magazine. The streaming of this song marked the first full-length song to be heard from Currents.

The album charted at number 66 on the Billboard 200, making it the group's highest-charting album to date.

== Production (May–October 2012) ==
The group began production of their fourth studio album on May 5, 2012, in their studio constructed in their hometown of Tyler, TX. The studio was built by members Weston Dupree and Garron DuPree, alongside their audio engineer Mark Schwartzkopf. The studio itself was built to be attached to the house of singer Sherri DuPree-Bemis, and Say Anything frontman Max Bemis. Upon completion of the studio in late April 2012, the group began the pre-production and tracking of the album in early May 2012.

This album was the first of the group's albums to be entirely self-produced, recorded with virtually no outside influences. The album, though unnamed until after the recording process was completed, features a lush oceanic theme, complemented by a more layered atmospheric production.

== Track listing ==
No.	Title	Length
1.	"Currents"	4:12
2.	"Blue Fish"	4:02
3.	"Drink the Water"	3:57
4.	"Save My Soul"	3:55
5.	"Millstone"	4:28
6.	"Real World"	4:41
7.	"Wicked Child"	4:58
8.	"Find Me Here"	4:00
9.	"Wonder English"	3:33
10.	"Lost Enemies"	3:39
11.	"The Night Comes"	4:55
12.	"Shelter"	4:48
Total length:		51:08

== Credits ==
=== Songwriting ===
- Sherri DuPree-Bemis
- Stacy DuPree-King
- Chauntelle DuPree-D'Agostino (Millstone)

=== Instrumentation ===
- Sherri DuPree-Bemis - guitar, vocals
- Stacy DuPree-King - Piano/Keyboards, guitar, vocals
- Chauntelle DuPree-D'Agostino - guitar, vocals
- Garron DuPree - bass, guitar
- Weston DuPree - drums, misc instrumentation
- Jeremy Larson - strings
- Christie DuPree - guest vocals (Wicked Child)
- Collin DuPree - acoustic guitar (Currents)
- Max Bemis - bridge (Save My Soul)

=== Production ===
- Jeremy Larson - mixing
- Garron DuPree - recording engineer, audio engineer
- Mark Schwartzkopf - additional engineering
