= Combinations (album) =

Studio album by Eisley
- Released: August 14, 2007
- Recorded: 2007
- Genres: Indie pop, Christian pop
- Length: 34:25
- Label: Reprise
- Producers: Richard Gibbs, Chad Gilbert, Eisley

Eisley chronology
Room Noises (2005)	Combinations (2007)	The Valley (2011)

Singles from Combinations
- 1. "Invasion" Released: 2007

Professional ratings
Aggregate scores
Source	Rating
Metacritic	(72/100)link
Review scores
Source	Rating
AbsolutePunk	(85%) link
AllMusic	link
Austin American-Statesman	link
The A.V. Club	link
Houston Chronicle	link

Combinations is the second studio album by Eisley. The album was released on August 14, 2007.

The first single for Combinations was "Invasion". Two music videos were intended to be shot for the single. One was a "viral video" for YouTube and iTunes and another was rumored to be made for MTV and other media outlet, but due to assumed conflict with their label and confusion on how to market the band, only one video was made. Invasion wasn't pushed to radio and was the only "single" for the album. A video for Many Funerals that was shot by Israel Anthem was spoken about around the time of the band's acoustic tour in 2007, but never surfaced.

A special edition CD/DVD includes eight songs from the band's Ventura, CA, concert, the "Memories" video and a 30-minute "The Making of Combinations" video piece. The cover art is coloured blue instead of yellow. A vinyl release was expected as the band was recording, but one never came to be. The band is now working on getting it released on vinyl in a combo pack with Room Noises (which only got pressed for 1000 vinyl copies originally).

Combinations debuted in the Billboard 100 with first week sales of 9,300.

== Track listing ==
No.	Title	Length
1.	"Many Funerals"	2:51
2.	"Invasion"	3:36
3.	"Taking Control"	3:03
4.	"Go Away"	3:04
5.	"I Could Be There for You"	3:35
6.	"Come Clean"	3:33
7.	"Ten Cent Blues"	3:59
8.	"A Sight to Behold"	3:15
9.	"Combinations"	3:34
10.	"If You're Wondering"	3:55
Total length:		34:25

iTunes U.S. Store Bonus Tracks
No.	Title	Length
11.	"Marsh King's Daughter"	3:45
12.	"Invasion (music video)"

Coalition of Independent Music Stores Bonus Disc
No.	Title	Length
11.	"Sun Feet"	3:58
12.	"Invasion (Live at Connect Sessions)"	3:35

UK Version
No.	Title	Length
11.	"Golly Sandra"	3:29
12.	"Marvelous Things"	3:31

=== Special Edition DVD ===
- The "Making of" Combinations
- Ventura, CA concert footage
1. "Mr. Pine"
2. "Memories"
3. "Just Like We Do"
4. "Marvelous Things"
5. "Head Against the Sky"
6. "Golly Sandra"
7. "Like the Actors"
8. "Trolley Wood"
- "Memories" music video
