= Eisley =

Rock band from Tyler, Texas

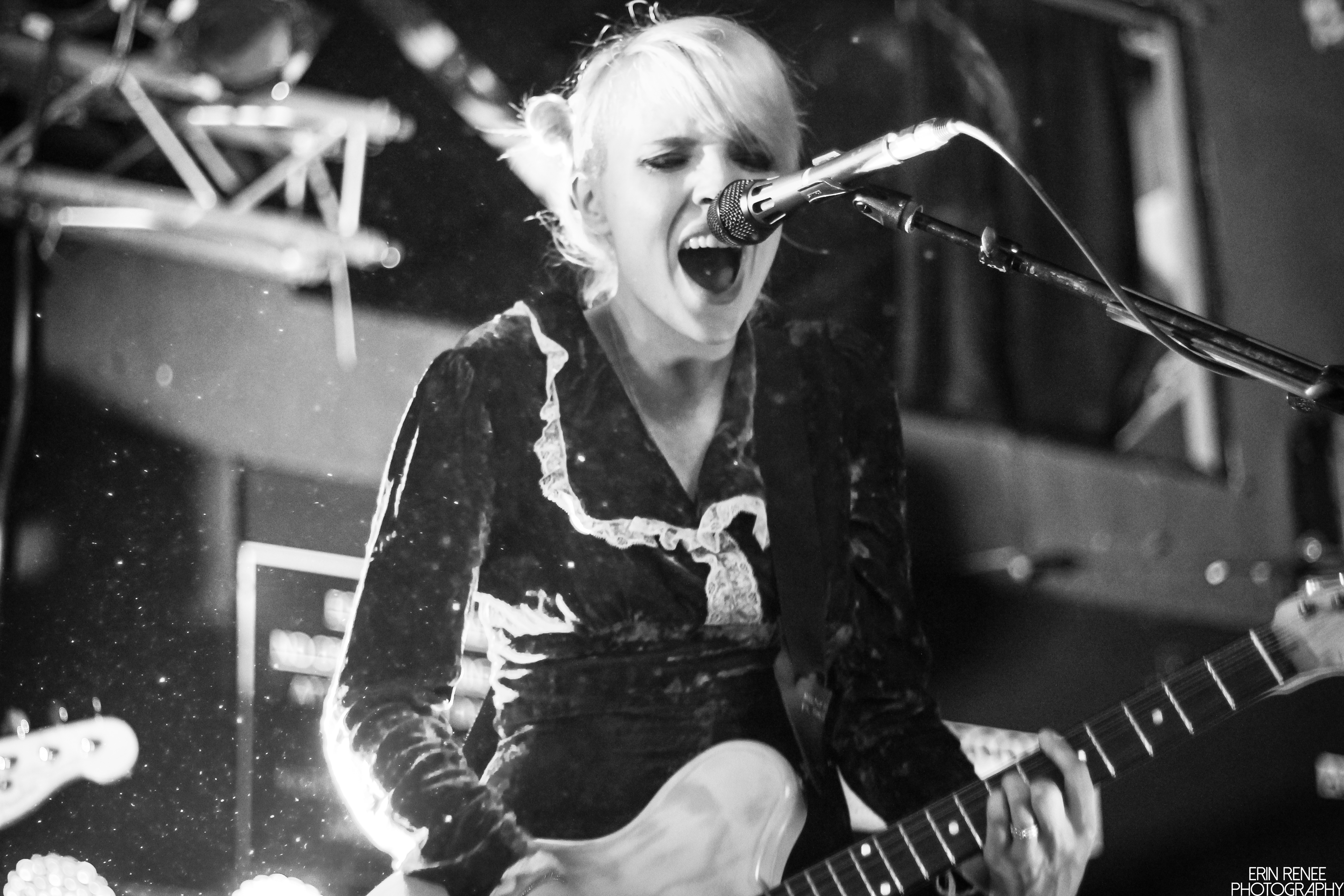
- Sherri DuPree performing in Boston, Massachusetts in 2014

Background information
- Origin: Tyler, Texas, U.S.
- Genres: Indie pop; emo; alternative rock
- Years active: 1997–2019 (hiatus)
- Labels: Equal Vision; Reprise; Record Collection; Warner Bros.; Sire
- Members: Sherri DuPree; Garron DuPree
- Past members: Jonathan Wilson; Chauntelle D' Agostino; Stacy King; Weston DuPree
- Website: www.eisley.com

Eisley is an American rock band from Tyler, Texas, originally consisting of siblings Sherri DuPree, Chauntelle DuPree, Stacy DuPree and Weston DuPree. Sherri DuPree is the band's sole remaining original member, joined in the current line-up by her cousin Garron DuPree, who has been in the band since 2005. Their name is inspired by Mos Eisley, a fictional city in the Star Wars universe. Since forming, the band has released five studio albums: Room Noises (2005), Combinations (2007), The Valley (2011), Currents (2013), and I'm Only Dreaming (2017), along with numerous EPs. The band has been inactive since 2019.

== History ==
=== 1997–2004: Formation and early years ===
The band was formed in 1997 when Chauntelle and Sherri began creating music together after having been inspired by musical acts like the Beatles, Jeremy Enigk, and Radiohead. Younger sister Stacy (who was then 8 years old) became frustrated over their insistence that she was too young to be a part of the band and wrote her own song without their help before she was inducted. Their brother Weston (who was then 10 years old) soon joined the band as the drummer.

Boyd and Kim Dupree, parents of the four DuPree siblings, ran a venue called Brewtones Coffee Galaxy by occupying the space of their Vineyard church on days when it was not in use. Eisley, then known as the Towheads, began years of service as the house band, giving them their first exposure. At Brewtones, the band played with many other acts including Ester Drang, Midlake, and Waterdeep. Although the band was approached by Christian record labels early on, they preferred to avoid these as they did not consider themselves a Christian band. They soon became Moss Eisley, a reference to the Mos Eisley Cantina in the Star Wars trilogy. After signing to Reprise/Warner Records, the band shortened the name due to possible legal ramifications. The band played numerous weekend shows at the venue until they became too busy with other opportunities.

After emerging on the Dallas scene in 2001, playing hundreds of shows throughout Texas and garnering a fan base as an indie band, Eisley was signed to Warner Bros. Records in 2003. The same year, the band won "Best New Artist" at the Dallas Observer Music Awards. The band had some early radio success with the song "Telescope Eyes" from the Laughing City EP. It was ranked the top 25th most played song on FM 102.1 ("The Edge") in Dallas in 2003. Also in 2003, Eisley opened for Coldplay on the North American "A Rush of Blood to the Head" tour.

=== 2004–2006: Room Noises ===
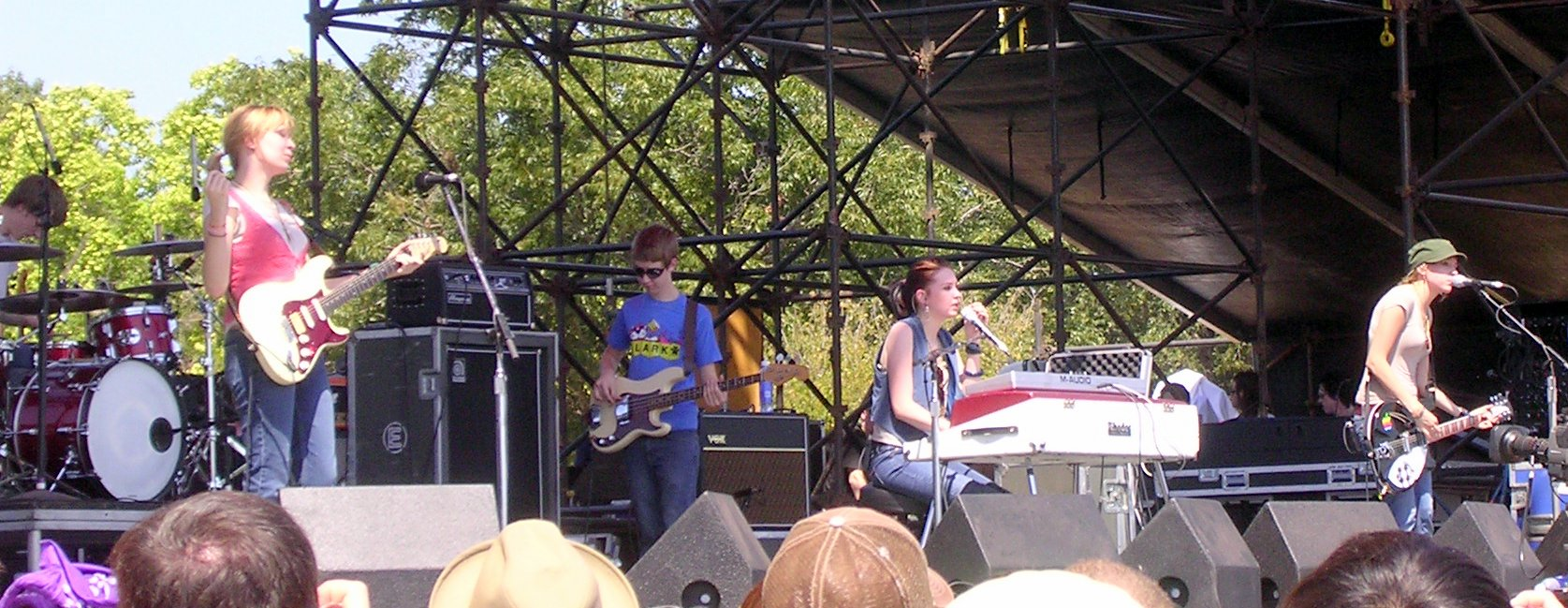
Eisley performing at Austin City Limits festival in 2005

During the majority of 2004, the band spent most of their time recording their debut album. During the first part of 2005, the band toured extensively with New Found Glory. In June 2005, Eisley embarked on their first headlining tour, The Summer Scenic Tour, to support their debut album Room Noises with Lovedrug and Pilotdrift as opening acts. On June 10, they performed a sold out show at The Troubadour in California. The recording of The Troubadour show was to be released as a live DVD; however, the band was not pleased with the footage or audio so nothing ever came of it.

The band went on to tour with Hot Hot Heat in July. During this tour Eisley's then bassist, Jonathon Wilson, announced he was leaving. He was replaced as bassist by Garron DuPree, the DuPrees' then fifteen-year-old cousin in 2005.

In August, after the Hot Hot Heat tour, the band went into the studio in Seattle for a day to track Head Against The Sky. The song was later released in October of that year on the Head Against The Sky E.P. with three songs from the cancelled Troubadour DVD. In October and November 2005, Eisley went on tour with Switchfoot as openers. Around this time, the band started playing new, unrecorded material for their second album. In March 2006, the band did a small tour in Australia as main support for Taking Back Sunday. Following that, Eisley headlined their last tour in support of Room Noises, The Final Noise Tour, alongside Simon Dawes and Timmy Curran.

=== 2006–2010: Combinations and label issues ===
In September 2006, Eisley headed back to the studio to record their follow up to Room Noises. While tracking for their second album, Sherri and Stacy also recorded vocals for Bright Eyes's album Cassadaga. The band finished recording the album in November 2006, but due to assumed conflicts with their label, the album was delayed. Combinations was finally released on August 14, 2007.

Eisley performed on a special acoustic tour with Wesley Jensen during the summer of 2007. The band made their national television debut on Late Night with Conan O'Brien on August 30, 2007, performing Combination's lead and only single "Invasion". They spent a couple of months in late 2007 opening shows for Mutemath around the country. Then, in the spring and early summer of 2008, Eisley headlined their own cross-continent finance tour in support of their latest release, Combinations, with openers including The Envy Corps (who had to leave mid-tour due to an envious European tour), Vedera and The Myriad. On December 18, 2007, the band released the Like the Actors E.P. on iTunes. This EP contained the two B-sides for Combinations as well as an unreleased track from Room Noises, titled "Sun Feet".

In the spring of 2008, Eisley headlined the only main tour that would be done in support of Combinations. Eisley has also played a number of individual shows. They played a handful of shows at the South by Southwest (SXSW) music festival in Austin, Texas, in March 2007. In August 2007, they performed at the Carling Weekend Festival, held in Reading and Leeds, England. They returned to Tyler to perform at Brewtones on December 15, 2007.

After the Combinations tour, the band originally planned to take a break before starting work on their third album. At this time, relationships with their label was not at the best, and the band's personal lives were getting back into control. However, at the urging of their good friend and A&R, Eisley went back into the studio later in 2008 to record their third album. During the recording process, the band did a few one-off shows. Notably, they performed a benefit with the Seattle Symphony with Mateo Messina in 2008 and headlined a show at Baylor University in the spring of 2009, their first real show since the end of their Combinations tour.

During this time, Warner Brothers shifted Eisley from the Reprise to the Sire label. Throughout most of the summer of 2009, the band worked on their follow up album. They finished recording most of the album in August of that year, but complications with WB delayed the release. However, the band went on tour with Dupree's husband's band Say Anything that fall and released the Fire Kite E.P. as a teaser for the upcoming album.

=== 2010–2011: New label and The Valley ===
On February 9, 2010, the band officially announced that they had parted ways with WB right before the Say Anything tour. Throughout most of 2010, Eisley shopped for a new label while they tried to acquire the rights to release their third album. They played SXSW that year, and in late spring and early summer, the band did a small headlining tour called The Mild Mild Midwest tour up to the Cornerstone Music Festival. In the fall of 2010, the band did another headlining tour called The Over The River and Through The Wood tour in anticipation for their third album.

On November 4, 2010, it was announced that the band had signed with Equal Vision Records and had also acquired the rights from WB to release their third album tracked at Rosewood Studios, a studio they had pushed WB into letting them record at in their hometown of Tyler. Following that, on December 10, 2010, it was announced that Eisley would be releasing their new album on March 1, 2011, titled The Valley. In February 2011, Eisley went on tour as main support for Rooney. On this tour, the band debuted several more new songs in anticipation for The Valley. A week before release, the band streamed the album on Spin.com. Finally on March 1, The Valley was released.

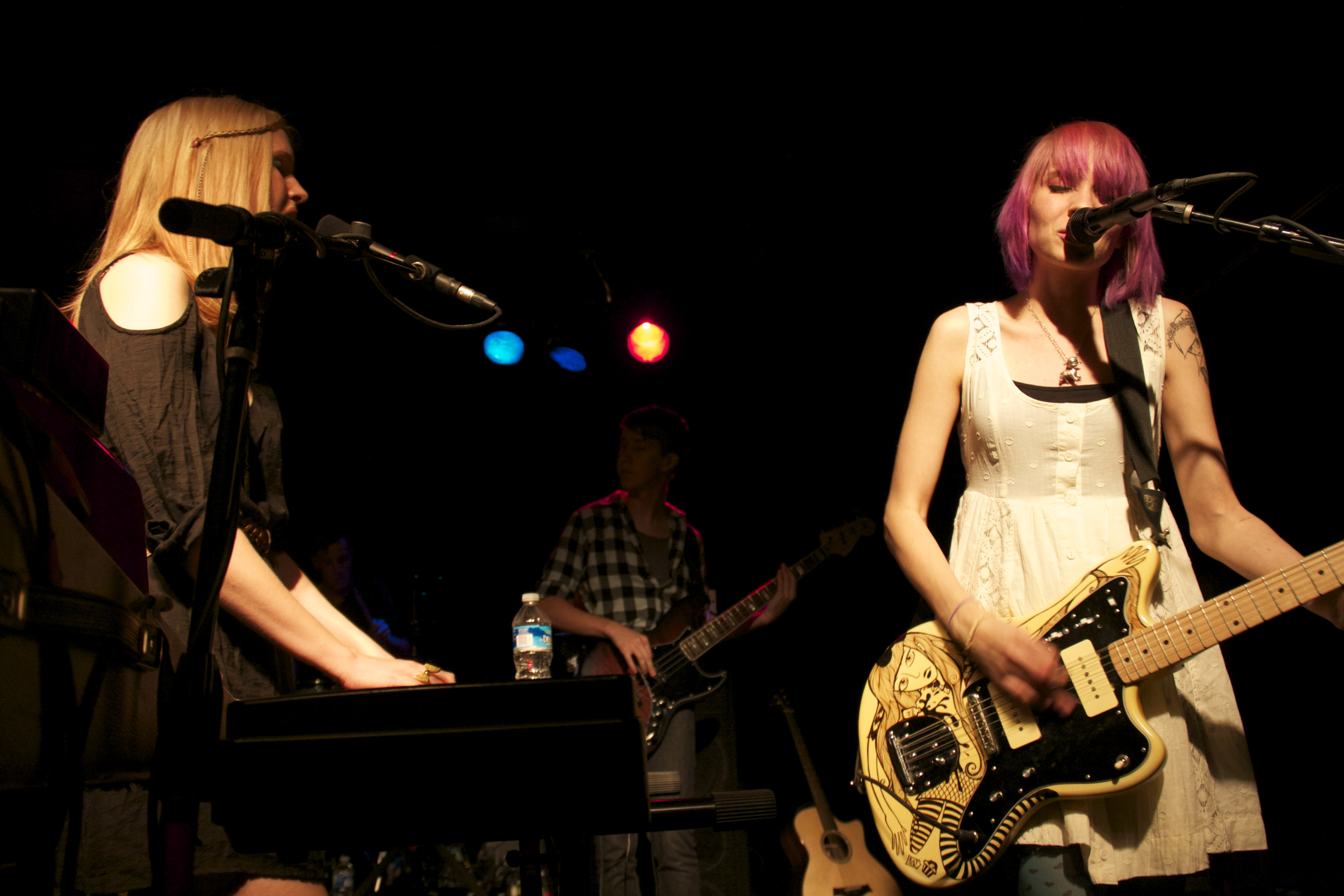
Stacy, Sherri and Garron DuPree performing in 2011.

The Valley was met with generally positive reviews. Sputnikmusic and, to the band's surprise, Absolute Punk both gave the album a rating of 90, commenting on the band's vocal style and the instrumentation being different from previous albums. All Music Guide, Alternative Press, and The Onion A.V. club also praised the album as well. However, Under the Radar had mixed reviews, but commented on the tunes being enjoyable as well as the Dupree sisters' voices being thrilling. The Austin Chronicle gave the album a negative review, criticizing the album's focus to love and broken relationships as opposed to the whimsical style and fantastical imagery found on the band's 2005 debut Room Noises and the EPs before.

=== 2011–2015: Deep Space E.P. and Currents ===
In June 2011, after finishing their first headlining tour for The Valley, the band announced plans on Twitter and Tumblr of recording a new EP in August. Also, according to online posts from Tumblr and Instagram, there will be a limited edition of the EP, which will possibly include a bio, original lyrics, rare and never before seen photos, past tour memorabilia, various posters, old album artwork dating back to the Mos Eisley days, and possibly more.

Throughout August 2011, the band recorded the Deep Space E.P.. Originally, the EP was going to contain a few b-sides from The Valley, but the band ultimately decided to record mostly new songs. Following the completion of the EP, Eisley recorded a music video for their next single, "The Valley". Though the band initially stated the new EP would be released in the fall, they decided on a February 2012 date instead. The reasons being they needed the EP to close out The Valley and point to their fourth album. Recording for the new album started in May 2012.

In a newsletter sent to fans in July 2012, the band announced they were currently writing and recording a fourth album in their new home studio. The record and a debut tour was expected in 2013, and the release date for the album, titled Currents, was set for May 28, 2013. On April 16, 2013, Eisley released an online stream of the song "Drink The Water", hosted by Nylon Magazine. The streaming of this song marked the first song to be heard from Currents.

=== 2015–present: I'm Only Dreaming and line-up changes ===
In 2015, Eisley began writing and preparation for I'm Only Dreaming, their fifth studio album, with production to begin in 2016. Shortly before announcing their fall North American tour with Copeland, the band announced via their YouTube channel that guitarist Chauntelle D'Agostino and keyboardist/vocalist Stacy King had departed the band, and would be pursuing their own musical projects. It was also made known that Eisley's drummer, Weston, would no longer be touring, but would continue recording with the group in a limited fashion. Sherri and Garron DuPree thus became the core of Eisley, with Garron seeing an increased role musically.

On June 10, 2016, Eisley revealed that they had begun the process of recording their I'm Only Dreaming with the assistance of producer Will Yip at the band's own studio in Tyler at the beginning of the month. DuPree spoke of the new album, saying "Musically, you could say it’s classic Eisley, in the sense that it’s melodic, moody pop and is written from the heart. Lyrically, it’s very whimsical; it has a vibe that will take you into its own world and let you escape your normal life for a few minutes. I like to cloak things in a little mystery and romance; I think it’s part of what makes all of Eisley’s songs sound like they’re from the same world. Every record is like opening and reading a book in a series."

Tracking for the album concluded in July 2016, with mention of plans to release the record in early 2017. In January 2017, Eisley released "Louder Than A Lion" featuring Anthony Green, the first song from I'm Only Dreaming.

I'm Only Dreaming was released in the United States on February 17, 2017, and was met with mostly positive reviews. The album was noted for having a more simplistic, dreamy sound compared to Eisley's previous releases. This was the first of Eisley's albums to feature Sherri DuPree as the band's sole lead vocalist. DuPree commented on the departure of D'Agostino and King in an interview with Alternative Press, saying that the album was part of "proving to myself that I could make a great record on my own." The band played a select run of shows in support of it, with their final performance to date taking place at the Granada Theater in Dallas on July 22nd, 2017.

In July 2018, I'm Only Dreaming of Days Long Past, was released. The album featured reimagined and stripped down versions of tracks from I'm Only Dreaming. The band's final release to date came in October 2019, with the release of "I Won't Cry" – a song originally recorded for I'm Only Dreaming but did not make the final cut of the album.

=== Side projects and guest appearances ===
It was announced by Max Bemis (of Say Anything) in September 2009 that he and his wife, Sherri, were working on a small project that "became something even cooler." They created a side project called Perma. Limited edition CDs were sold on the fall promo tour of the self-titled Say Anything. Each copy included a hand drawn cover by Max or Sherri. Perma planned to release their debut album sometime in 2013. They have already released their first single, "Knockout".

Stacy is involved in a project with her husband Darren King and producer Jeremy Larson under the title Sucré. Sucré's debut album, A Minor Bird, was released on April 10, 2012.

Chauntelle and husband Todd D'Agostino (of LaRose Guitars) released a three-song EP called Everlasting Songs under the name Rising Fawn in June 2013.

Guest appearances:

- Sherri and Stacy sang back-up for Head Automatica's debut album, Decadence, on the track "Dance Party Plus"
- Sherri and Stacy performed back-up on the Fair track "Unglued", from Fair's album The Best Worst-Case Scenario
- Sisters Sherri, Stacy, and Christie provided backing vocals for the song "We Chose The King" on Brighten's debut album, King vs. Queen
- Sherri, Stacy, Christie, and Chauntelle appeared on several tracks from New Found Glory's album Coming Home
- Sherri and Stacy appeared on three songs from David Crowder Band's album Church Music
- Sherri and Stacy provided background vocals for Bright Eyes' record Cassadaga while recording Eisley's second album, Combinations
- Sherri contributed backing vocals for New Found Glory's cover of "It Ain't Me Babe" from their LP, From the Screen to Your Stereo Part II, while Stacy performed on another track
- Sherri and Stacy did backing vocals for The Maine's EP ...And a Happy New Year, Ho, Ho Hopefully
- Sherri has collaborated with her husband, Max Bemis, on two tracks from Say Anything's self-titled album, the interlude on Two Tongues' self-titled album, three songs on Say Anything's Anarchy, My Dear, many songs from Say Anything's album Hebrews, and on the 2016 album I Don't Think It Is

== Members ==
Final line-up

- Sherri DuPree – lead vocals, rhythm guitar (1997–2019)
- Garron DuPree – bass (2005–2019), keyboards, lead guitar (2015–2019)

Former members

- Jonathan Wilson – bass (2001–2005)
- Chauntelle D'Agostino — lead guitar, backing and occasional lead vocals (1997–2015)
- Stacy King — keyboards, rhythm guitar, backing and occasional lead vocals (1997–2015)
- Weston DuPree – drums (1997–2015)

Former touring musicians

- Elle Puckett – lead guitar (2015–2017)
- Remington DuPree – drums (2015–2017)
- Jedidiah Lachmann – keyboards (2015–2017)

== Discography ==
Studio albums

- Room Noises (2005)
- Combinations (2007)
- The Valley (2011)
- Currents (2013)
- I'm Only Dreaming (2017)
