= Room Noises =

Studio album by Eisley
- Released: February 8, 2005
- Recorded: 2004
- Genres: Indie rock, Christian rock
- Length: 41:01
- Label: Reprise
- Producers: Rob Schnapf, Rob Cavallo, Aaron Sprinkle, John Shanks, Eisley

Eisley chronology
Telescope Eyes E.P. (2005)	Room Noises (2005)	Head Against The Sky E.P. (2005)

Professional ratings
Review scores
Source	Rating
AllMusic	4/5 stars
Paste Magazine	3.5/5 stars
Rolling Stone	2/5 stars
Village Voice	4/5 stars

Room Noises is the first studio album by Eisley. It was released on February 8, 2005 on Reprise Records. The album was placed at No. 9 among Paste magazine's top albums of 2005. The album had three singles: "Memories", "Telescope Eyes", and "I Wasn't Prepared". Music videos were made for each single, as well as "Marvelous Things".

== Track listing ==
No.	Title	Length
1.	"Memories"	3:27
2.	"Telescope Eyes"	3:03
3.	"I Wasn't Prepared"	3:22
4.	"Golly Sandra"	3:29
5.	"Marvelous Things"	3:31
6.	"Brightly Wound"	3:38
7.	"Lost at Sea"	3:38
8.	"My Lovely"	3:26
9.	"Just Like We Do"	3:09
10.	"Plenty of Paper"	3:21
11.	"One Day I Slowly Floated Away"	3:35
12.	"Trolley Wood"	3:22
Total length:		41:01

== Charts ==
Chart (2005)	Peak position
U.S. Billboard 200	189
U.S. Billboard Heatseekers Albums	6

== Release ==
Early promotional copies of this album included a remixed bonus track "Lost at Sea" at the end of the album. The band later decided to drop the bonus track from the official release. It later appeared on an Urban Outfitters compilation CD and on a radio promotional EP alongside "Telescope Eyes", "I Wasn't Prepared" and "Golly Sandra".

Warner Brothers originally pressed only 1000 copies of Room Noises on vinyl.

== Performance credits ==
- Sherri DuPree – lead vocals, guitar
- Stacy DuPree – keyboards, vocals, and guitar
- Chauntelle DuPree – guitar
- Weston DuPree – drums
- Jonathan Wilson – bass guitar
- Elijah Thomson – bass guitar
- Casey Prestwood – steel guitar
- Eddie Harbour – hand clapping

== Technical credits ==
- Brian Gardner – mastering
- Rob Schnapf – producer
- Rob Cavallo – producer
- Aaron Sprinkle – producer
- Doug Boehm – engineer
- John Shanks – engineer
- Eisley – engineer
- Doug Mcean – engineer
