= The Bamboozle =

Former annual music festival in New Jersey, US

- Genre: Various
- Locations: Asbury Park Convention Hall, Asbury Park, New Jersey (2003-2005, 2012); Meadowlands Sports Complex, East Rutherford, New Jersey (2006–2011); Bader Field, Atlantic City, New Jersey (2023)
- Years active: 2003–2012, 2023
- Website: thebamboozle.com

The Bamboozle (Note: The 2023 revival is simply named “Bamboozle”, dropping the “The”) was an annual three-day music festival which was held in New Jersey from 2003 to 2012, and was scheduled for a 2023 revival in Atlantic City by its founder. Every year, new bands competed for spots during the two days. The event evolved out of the Skate and Surf Festival. The 2012 event was the final one of its original run, as founder John D'Esposito subsequently left Bamboozle due to creative differences with organizing partners.

== History ==
=== Early versions ===
In 2003, The Great Bamboozle - originally known as Skate & Surf - was held from May 30 to June 1 at THE STONE PONY in Asbury Park, New Jersey, with headliners Keller Williams, the Roots, Medeski, Martin & Wood and Dark Star Orchestra, with opening acts Bamm Hollow, New Blood Revival.

The 2004 event remained at Convention Hall, expanding from four stages to six, and took place from June 4 to 6, with G. Love and Special Sauce, moe., and Sonic Youth headlining. Other acts appearing included Xavier Rudd, Tristan Prettyman, Matt Nathanson, the Brakes, Days Awake, Dujeous, Kaki King, Blue Highway, Railroad Earth, RAQ, Raisinhill, Antigone Rising, Corn Mo, M. Ward, Stellastarr, My Morning Jacket, Jesse Malin, Patti Smith, Lake Trout, Ambulance LTD, French Kicks, Apollo Sunshine, Steel Train, and Nicole Atkins.

=== The Bamboozle 2005 ===
In 2005 the festival took the name "The Bamboozle" for the first time. It was held from April 29 to May 1, with the main stage at Asbury Park Convention Hall in Asbury Park, New Jersey, and seven other stages around the city. My Chemical Romance, the Starting Line, and Thrice headlined the three days. Brand New was originally scheduled to headline the first show, but was forced to cancel their show, while Thrice took over as the headliner. Other bands appearing included I Can Make A Mess Like Nobody's Business, Relient K, the Blood Brothers, Motion City Soundtrack, Straylight Run, Finch, Spitalfield, the Receiving End of Sirens, Roses Are Red, Minus the Bear, the Honorary Title, Nightmare of You, Acceptance, Vendetta Red, Anberlin, the Goodwill, Paulson, Kane Hodder, Kevin Devine, Extol, Embrace Today, Anterrabae, Haste the Day, Funeral for a Friend, It Dies Today, Bleeding Through, Patent Pending, I Voted for Kodos, Dropping Daylight, Scenes from a Movie, the Dirtbombs, Say Anything, Mae, Silverstein, A Static Lullaby, Hidden in Plain View, Rufio, the Early November, Midtown, Senses Fail, Further Seems Forever featuring Chris Carrabba, Fall Out Boy, Small Towns Burn A Little Slower, A Wilhelm Scream, Melee, the Academy Is..., the Fight, JamisonParker, Paramore, Moneen, Gatsbys American Dream, Emery, Big D and the Kids Table, Jenoah, House of Fools, Veda, the Honorary Title, Number One Fan, the Spill Canvas, This Day & Age, Over It, Chronic Future, Copeland, Action Action, Lovedrug, Dave Melillo, John Ralston, Lucero, the New Amsterdams, Hot Rod Circuit, Piebald, Crime in Stereo, Hit the Lights, Emanuel, Pistolita, A Thorn For Every Heart, Saosin, the Bled, the Black Maria, Lola Ray, October Fall, the Audition, the A.K.A.'s, Army of Me, Adam Richman, Long Since Forgotten, What About Frank?, Driving East, Bear vs. Shark, New Years Day, For Felix, Bedlight for Blue Eyes, Cute Is What We Aim For, My American Heart, Wakefield, Northern State, Armor for Sleep, Catch 22, the All-American Rejects, Underoath, Flogging Molly, the Bouncing Souls, Alkaline Trio, Scatter the Ashes, Hellogoodbye, Ben Nichols, Say Anything, the Explosion, Bayside, Circa Survive, Halifax, Throw Rag, Ley Royal Scam, Gym Class Heroes, Days Away, Punchline, Mike Park, Idiot Pilot, Plain White T's, Street Dogs, High School Football Heroes, Drive By, Classic Case, Boys Night Out, the Chariot, these Arms are Snakes, Fear Before the March of Flames, the Sleeping, Waking Ashland, Suburban Legends, the Loved Ones, Sirsy, and the Track Record.

=== The Bamboozle 2006 ===
The Bamboozle 2006 was held over six stages at the Meadowlands Sports Complex in the parking lot of Giants Stadium in East Rutherford, New Jersey, from May 6–7. Fall Out Boy headlined on May 6, and Taking Back Sunday headlined on May 7. Other bands appearing included the Hush Sound, Halifax, the Spill Canvas, Armor for Sleep, Silverstein, From First to Last, Hawthorne Heights, the All-American Rejects, the Sleeping, Bayside, Hidden in Plain View, Hellogoodbye, Mae, Relient K, Streetlight Manifesto, Motion City Soundtrack, Thursday, the A.K.A.'s, the Pink Spiders, Over It, Pistolita, This Day & Age, Paramore, the Rocket Summer, October Fall, Permanent ME, Love Arcade, Drive By, Hit the Lights, Minus the Bear, Mewithoutyou, Forgive Durden, Russian Circles, Madina Lake, Endeverafter, Valencia, Chiodos, John Ralston, We the Kings, Monty, House of Heroes, the Red Jumpsuit Apparatus, Flashlight Brown, Amber Pacific, Jonas Brothers, Just Surrender, Emanuel, Alexisonfire, the Receiving End of Sirens, Thirty Seconds to Mars, Method Man, Panic! at the Disco, Senses Fail, HIM, AFI, Aiden, Moneen, Strike Anywhere, Acceptance, Say Anything, Underoath, Saves the Day, Lifetime, Bedouin Soundclash, Paint It Black, State Radio, I Am the Avalanche, Men, Women & Children, Nightmare of You, Circa Survive, As Cities Burn, the Number 12 Looks Like You, He Is Legend, Stretch Arm Strong, the Fall of Troy, Poison the Well, the Bled, Every Time I Die, From Autumn to Ashes, Crash Romeo, Zox, Sound the Alarm, Permanent Me, Envy on the Coast, Cute is What We Aim For, A Thorn for Every Heart, the Riverboat Gamblers, Fluff My Boner, and MC Lars.

2006 also saw the first year of a sister festival in the west of the United States, known as "The Bamboozle Left". This was held at the Cal Poly Pomona Athletic Field in Pomona, California, on October 14–15. Dashboard Confessional, Brand New and Thrice headlined, with 68 other bands performing on five different stages. Other bands appearing at the Bamboozle Left included Secondhand Serenade, the Red Jumpsuit Apparatus, Paramore, Cobra Starship, Gym Class Heroes, Hellogoodbye, Jack's Mannequin, Something Corporate, Sugarcult, Mêlée, the Matches, All Time Low, Envy on the Coast, Halifax, Hit the Lights, Cute is What We Aim For, William Tell, Quietdrive, Big Japan, Sherwood, Playradioplay!, Fireworks, Between the Trees, Strata, Yesterdays Rising, HORSE the Band, Valencia, Ronnie Day, We the Kings, Jonas Brothers, Supernova, the Bled, Murs, Yellowcard, Thirty Seconds to Mars, I Am Ghost, My American Heart, the Audition, Escape the Fate, the Fall of Troy, Pistolita, Chris Conley, The Spill Canvas, the Secret Handshake, Danger Radio, Permanent Me, Drop Dead, Gorgeous, So They Say, Daphne Loves Derby, Amber Pacific, the Outline, Sound the Alarm, A Thorn for Every Heart, Ernie Halter, and Men, Women & Children.

=== The Bamboozle 2007 ===
The Bamboozle 2007 was again held at the Meadowlands Sports Complex from May 5–6. Linkin Park and My Chemical Romance headlined the event, along with over 150 bands, artists, and comedians performing on nine stages. A compilation album, The Bamboozle 2007: Everything Will Be Much Better Once I Get These Clowns Out of My Head, was released of the event. Several bands performed under "mystery names", such as the Matches (the Locals), Hawthorne Heights (the Death of...), Thursday (Bearfort), Motion City Soundtrack (The Great American Freedom Machine), Van Stone (Yesterday's 2morrow), the Sleeping (Biker Women), and Silverstein (XCanuckX).

Bands appearing at the 2007 event included Andrew W.K., Boys Like Girls, Silverstein, Bayside, Cartel, Say Anything, New Found Glory, Hellogoodbye, the Receiving End of Sirens, Cute Is What We Aim For, Paramore, the Spill Canvas, the Starting Line, MC Hammer, Saves the Day, Muse, the Pink Spiders, Valencia, Lydia, Secondhand Serenade, This Providence, Motion City Soundtrack, the Rocket Summer, the High Court, Permanent Me, Maylene and the Sons of Disaster, Men, Women & Children, Houston Calls, Hit the Lights, Bearfort, Lordi, Forgive Durden, the A.K.A.s, Limbeck, Manchester Orchestra, the Cribs, Hot Rod Circuit, Moneen, Playradioplay, Ronnie Day, Madina Lake, the Audition, Meg & Dia, the Almost, the Hush Sound, We the Kings, Envy on the Coast, the Matches, Thrice, the Sleeping, New Atlantic, Rookie of the Year, Whole Wheat Bread featuring Rob Base and DJ E-Z Rock, Mitch Fatel, Donnell Rawlings, Just Surrender, The Liam Show, So They Say, Patent Pending, Between the Trees, Jeffree Star, Brand New, Jedi Mind Tricks, the Early November, Mae, Armor for Sleep, the Red Jumpsuit Apparatus, Thrice, Taking Back Sunday, Young Love, Relient K, From First to Last, Circa Survive, Killswitch Engage, Yellowcard, Jack's Mannequin, "Weird Al" Yankovic, the Secret Handshake, Anberlin, Lydia, Daphne Loves Derby, All Time Low, the Sleeping, Plain White T's, Lordi, Drop Dead, Gorgeous, Haste the Day, the Devil Wears Prada, It Dies Today, the Bled, Norma Jean, As I Lay Dying, Blessthefall, the Oohlas, the Dear Hunter, Schoolyard Heroes, Halifax, State Radio, Rx Bandits, Juliette and the Licks, NORA, Sherwood, the Matches, Fair to Midland, Scary Kids Scaring Kids, Envy on the Coast, Hawthorne Heights, Catch 22, Jonas Brothers, Secondhand Serenade, the Spill Canvas, Danger Radio, Rookie of the Year, Jack's Mannequin, Treaty of Paris, Amber Pacific, Quietdrive, the Graduate, Conditions, We Are the Fury, Drive By, Dave Melillo, Powerspace, Monty Are I, Mêlée, Stereo Skyline, and Four Letter Lie.

=== The Bamboozle 2008 ===
In 2008, the Bamboozle added the Bamboozle Roadshow and a new festival called the Hoodwink. The Bamboozle Roadshow 2008 took place from March 28 to May 10 at small venues across the United States featuring several acts selected by the Bamboozle staff. The Hoodwink took place on May 2, one day before the Bamboozle, in the Giants Stadium parking lot in East Rutherford, New Jersey. In addition, the Bamboozle Left, named due to its taking place on the West Coast, was held for the second time, at the Verizon Wireless Amphitheatre in Irvine, California.

The Bamboozle Roadshow featured Armor for Sleep, Metro Station, Saves the Day, Set Your Goals, A Cursive Memory (selected dates) and Lydia (selected dates), and stopped in Seattle, Portland, San Francisco, Santa Cruz, Chico, California, Sparks, Nevada, Las Vegas, Tempe, Arizona, Irvine, California, Albuquerque, Austin, Dallas, Oklahoma City, Houston, Fort Lauderdale, St. Petersburg, Florida, Orlando, Atlanta, Cordova, Tennessee, Cincinnati, Grand Rapids, St Paul, Milwaukee, Chicago, Detroit, Columbus, Ohio, Norfolk, Virginia, Baltimore, Philadelphia, East Rutherford, New Jersey, and Worcester, Massachusetts.

The Bamboozle Left 2008 took place on April 5–6 at the Verizon Wireless Amphitheatre in Irvine, California. My Chemical Romance, Paramore, and the All-American Rejects headlined the festival. Other bands and artists appearing at the festival included Eye Alaska, Four Year Strong, We the Kings, Streetlight Manifesto, the Starting Line, Story of the Year, Reel Big Fish, Alkaline Trio, the Cab, Daphne Loves Derby, Bayside, Rx Bandits, the Bouncing Souls, New Found Glory, Face to Face, Jimmy Eat World, Automatic Loveletter, A Rocket to the Moon, An Angle, Valencia, Danger Radio, Hit the Lights, Steel Train, Alesana, Our Last Night, Josephine Collective, Rookie of the Year, Paper Rival, Sky Eats Airplane, Dear and the Headlights, the Forecast, the Audition, the Chariot, Austin Gibbs, Charlotte Sometimes, Takota, Zox, Every Avenue, Brighten, Dance Gavin Dance, the Morning Light, Supernova, House of Fools, Broadway Calls, Say No More, From First to Last, MxPx, We the Kings, Escape the Fate, Hawthorne Heights, Hot Water Music, Saves the Day, the Bravery, Chiodos, Schoolyard Heroes, Metro Station, Secondhand Serenade, Armor for Sleep, Billy Talent, Finch, Anti-Flag, Goldfinger, Blaqk Audio, Your Vegas, Protest the Hero, Pierce the Veil, Foxy Shazam, Street Dogs, Set Your Goals, Vinnie Caruana of the Movielife, the Dillinger Escape Plan, Dead to Me, Shook Ones, Drive By, the Sleeping, A Day to Remember, H_{2}O, 7 Seconds, Suicide Silence, theStart, Chronic Future, 3OH!3, the Secret Handshake, the Color Fred, Lydia, Suburban Legends, Jeffree Star, MC Lars, Making April, Breathe Carolina, the Medic Droid, Millionaires, A Cursive Memory, the A.K.A.'s, and Dr. Manhattan.

The Hoodwink 2008 took place on May 2, 2008, in parking lot of the Giants Stadium. This was a secret concert, announced on thebamboozle.com with the message "The Bamboozle Reserves The Right To Trick Everyone on Friday Night, May 2nd With a Mysterious Concert Held Somewhere Close To Another Major Festival". Bands appearing at The Hoodwink included the Pink Spiders, Metro Station, Armor for Sleep, Jack's Mannequin, Say Anything, Mae, Finch, Saves the Day, Chiodos, Someone Say Something, Rookie of the Year, Lydia, the Sleeping, End of an Era, Men, Women & Children, Set Your Goals, and MxPx.

Immediately after the Hoodwink, the Bamboozle 2008 was held at the Meadowlands Sports Complex for the third year in a row, on May 3 – 4. Snoop Dogg and Jimmy Eat World headlined the May 3 show, and Panic! at the Disco and Coheed & Cambria headlined the show on May 4. Other bands and artists who appeared at the festival included Say Anything, Cute Is What We Aim For, Story of the Year, the Red Jumpsuit Apparatus, Less Than Jake, Pepper, Chiodos, Jack's Mannequin, Paramore, Secondhand Serenade, Metro Station, Streetlight Manifesto, Armor for Sleep, Mindless Self Indulgence, Tokio Hotel, Saves The Day, the Bravery, A Rocket to the Moon, Single File, Playradioplay, Vinnie Caruana of the Movielife, Hit the Lights, MxPx, Set Your Goals, Alien Ant Farm, Fiction Plane, I Set My Friends on Fire, Dear and the Headlights, Lydia, the Maine, Snake Milk, Family Force 5, the Rocket Summer, Valencia, Men, Women & Children, Sing It Loud, Our Last Night, Josephine Collective, A Skylit Drive, Sky Eats Airplane, Breathe Carolina, the Audition, the Chariot, Kill Hannah, the Devil Wears Prada, Jeffree Star, MyChildren MyBride, the Sleeping featuring Sebastian Bach, Aiden, Maylene and the Sons of Disaster, Drop Dead, Gorgeous, Blessthefall, A Day to Remember, From First to Last, the Birthday Massacre, Alesana, Anthony Raneri, the Pink Spiders featuring Rotten Cotton, As Tall as Lions, Madina Lake, Nore Davis, Blake, Streetlight Manifesto, A Love Like Pi, Takota, Farewell, Every Avenue, Schoolyard Heroes, the Morning Of, Dr. Manhattan, Ludo, Zox, Treaty of Paris, the Maine, Scary Kids Scaring Kids, Cobra Starship, Circa Survive, Anti-Flag, the Bouncing Souls, Bret Michaels, Motion City Soundtrack, Gym Class Heroes, Finch, All Time Low, the Academy Is..., Say Anything, the Starting Line, Senses Fail, Thrice, the Mighty Mighty Bosstones, Automatic Loveletter, My American Heart, Four Year Strong, I Am The Avalanche, Envy on the Coast, the Hush Sound, the Banner, Foxy Shazam, Danger Radio, Forever The Sickest Kids, We the Kings, the Fall of Troy, the Receiving End of Sirens, Every Time I Die, Emmure, Between the Trees, the Secret Handshake, the Dear Hunter, 3OH!3, Mayday Parade, Phantom Planet, Just Surrender, the Color Fred, the Blackout!, Paper Rival, the White Tie Affair, Tyga, Charlotte Sometimes, Street Dogs, Alien Ant Farm, the Cab, the Protomen, Patent Pending, Triumph the Insult Comic Dog, Anthony Green, the Photo Atlas, Brighten, the Morning Light, You Me and Everyone We Know, Greeley Estates, Sound the Alarm, Good Old War, and Innerpartysystem.

=== The Bamboozle 2009 ===
The Hoodwink California took place on April 3, 2009, at the House of Blues in Anaheim, California, with five bands performing cover sets of other artists. Bands appearing included We the Kings covering Jimmy Eat World, Forever the Sickest Kids covering Avril Lavigne, the Cab covering Queen, Never Shout Never covering the Beatles, and Mercy Mercedes covering Midtown.

The Bamboozle Left 2009 took place on April 4 and 5, with headliners Fall Out Boy and 50 Cent on each day respectively. Other acts on the lineup included Forever the Sickest Kids, We the Kings, Senses Fail, Asher Roth, All Time Low, Metro Station, the Cab, the Aquabats, Silverstein, Bloodhound Gang, Hollywood Undead, Cobra Starship, the Get Up Kids, Stereo Skyline, Fight Fair, the Friday Night Boys, the Morning Light, Sonny Moore, Breathe Carolina, Brokencyde, the Limousines, Care Bears on Fire, Valencia, MyChildren MyBride, Stick to Your Guns, Parkway Drive, the Dangerous Summer, Sing it Loud, Hey Monday, Never Shout Never, Before Their Eyes, Blessthefall, Haste the Day, Peachcake, Ultraviolet Sound, Every Avenue, Patent Pending, Anarbor, Twin Atlantic, the Scene Aesthetic, Eye Alaska, Suicide Silence, the Vandals, the Used, Taking Back Sunday, the Bled, Shwayze, Saosin, Thrice, Deftones, Ten Second Epic, I Am Ghost, Forgive Durden, Underneath the Gun, Closure in Moscow, Attack Attack!, Leathermouth, the Ghost Inside, Winds of Plague, Emmure, the Adolescents, In Fear and Faith, Have Heart, A Skylit Drive, Born of Osiris, Ignite, the Bronx, One Block Radius, Chronic Future, Hyro Da Hero, B.o.B, LMFAO, Mac Lethal, P.O.S, Kevin Seconds, and DJ Skeet Skeet.

The Bamboozle Roadshow 2009 took place from April 5, 2009, to April 30, 2009, featuring We the Kings, Forever the Sickest Kids, the Cab, Never Shout Never, and Mercy Mercedes. The tour had 22 stops, in Tucson, Arizona, Dallas, San Antonio, Houston, Tulsa, Oklahoma, St. Louis, Missouri, Nashville, Tennessee, St. Petersburg, Florida, Fort Lauderdale, Florida, Lake Buena Vista, Florida, Jacksonville Beach, Florida, Atlanta, Indianapolis, Milwaukee, Chicago, Pontiac, Michigan, Cleveland, Ohio, Alfred, New York, Philadelphia, Towson, Maryland, Worcester, Massachusetts, and Farmingdale, New York.

The 2009 edition of the Hoodwink New Jersey took place on May 1, 2009, on four stages at the Meadowlands Sports Complex in East Rutherford, New Jersey, featuring bands playing entire sets covering the songs of other bands or artists, including Push Play covering Muse, Set Your Goals covering Dave Grohl's bands (Nirvana, Foo Fighters), Bayside covering NOFX, Sum 41 covering Metallica, Badfish and Todd Forman covering Sublime, Never Shout Never covering the Beatles, We the Kings covering Jimmy Eat World, Boys Like Girls covering Coldplay, New Found Glory covering Green Day, Inward Eye covering the Who, Mercy Mercedes covering Midtown, Forever the Sickest Kids covering Avril Lavigne, the Ataris covering The Misfits, Anti-Flag covering the Clash, Dubious Pastry covering Radiohead, Cartel covering New Found Glory, the Cab covering Queen, Danger Radio covering Britney Spears, and brokeNCYDE performing a Crunk set.

The Bamboozle 2009 took place on May 2 and 3. Fall Out Boy headlined the May 2 show, and No Doubt headlined the show on May 3. Other bands and artists to appear included Cash Cash, Edna's Goldfish, Bayside, the Bloodhound Gang, Gavin Rossdale, New Found Glory, the Get Up Kids, the Cab, Cartel, Forever The Sickest Kids, Metro Station, We The Kings, Boys Like Girls, Cobra Starship, All Time Low, Third Eye Blind, Dr. Acula, Sing It Loud, Patent Pending, Young Love, Our Last Night, Set Your Goals, Horrorpops, Gwar, MyChildren MyBride, International Superheroes of Hardcore, Fireworks, Attack Attack!, Dance Gavin Dance, Stick to Your Guns, Whitechapel, Parkway Drive, This Condition, the Friday Night Boys, Hey Monday, the Morning Light, Danger Radio, Cage the Elephant, Ace Enders and a Million Different People, Never Shout Never, Lydia, Forgive Durden, brokeNCYDE, Push Play, B.o.B, Mac Lethal, Shwayze, Mickey Avalon, Kid Cudi, Asher Roth, Sonny, Innerpartysystem, Anthony Jeselnik, Brian Posehn, Jon Lajoie, LMFAO, DJ Skeet Skeet, Days Difference, Stereo Skyline, the Bigger Lights, Sparks the Rescue, Family Force 5, Billy Talent, the Maine, Silverstein, Hollywood Undead, the Used, Rise Against, the Ataris, Tinted Windows, the Sounds, 3OH!3, Sum 41, Demi Lovato, Face to Face, Taking Back Sunday, Dead Men Dreaming, Closure in Moscow, Before Their Eyes, Gwen Stacy, A Day To Remember, Enter Shikari, Outbreak, This Is Hell, Haste the Day, Blessthefall, the Acacia Strain, Vision of Disorder, Suicide Silence, Motionless in White, Single File, Scotty Don't featuring Todd Forman, Hit the Lights, the White Tie Affair, Owl City, Hyper Crush, Push Play, Every Avenue, Valencia, This Providence, Ultraviolet Sound, A Rocket to the Moon, Rookie of the Year, Care Bears on Fire, Bo Burnham, Zach Galifianakis, Yak Ballz, Tina Parol, We Are the Ocean, My Favorite Highway, VersaEmerge, the Bride Wore Black, There for Tomorrow, Honor Society, and Locksley.

=== The Bamboozle 2010 ===
The Hoodwink California took place on March 26, 2010, at The Grove of Anaheim in Anaheim, California, featuring Circa Survive covering Nirvana, the Maine covering Everclear, Say Anything covering The Misfits, and All the Day Holiday covering the Beach Boys.

The Bamboozle California took place on March 27 and 28, 2010, at Angel Stadium in Anaheim, California. Bands and artists appearing at the festival included Twin Atlantic, Envy on the Coast, Chiodos, the Bouncing Souls, Circa Survive, Say Anything, Angels & Airwaves, AFI, Molotov Solution, For Today, As Blood Runs Black, Impending Doom, Dance Gavin Dance, Pierce the Veil, the Fall of Troy, Jamie's Elsewhere, Street Drum Corps, Disco Curtis, All the Day Holiday, Chase Long Beach, the Briggs, Jonny Craig, Anthony Jeselnik, Jon Lajoie, Joe Sib, All the Day Holiday, the Summer Set, Hey Monday, Iyaz, Story of the Year, Orianthi, the Maine, Never Shout Never, Something Corporate, the Cataracs, T. Mills, He is We, Call the Cops, Vita Chambers, the Ready Set, Kill Paradise, Far East Movement, Dirt Nasty, Colette Carr, After Midnight Project, This Century, Bobby Long, We Shot the Moon, the Colourist, Anarbor, Far, Piebald, Moshe Kasher, and Bo Burnham.

The Hoodwink New Jersey took place on April 30, 2010, at the Meadowlands Sports Complex in East Rutherford, New Jersey. Bands covering other bands' work included VersaEmerge covering Britney Spears, Steel Train covering Saves the Day, Emmure covering Rage Against the Machine, Take One Car covering At The Drive-In, the Maine covering Everclear, Motion City Soundtrack covering Nine Inch Nails, Eye Alaska covering Kanye West, the Summer Set covering Taylor Swift, All the Day Holiday covering the Beach Boys, Say Anything covering The Misfits, Andrew McMahon performing Bar Classics, and Saves the Day performing Weezer's Pinkerton.

The Bamboozle 2010 took place on May 1 and 2, 2010, also at the Meadowlands Sports Complex. Among the headliners were Paramore, Kesha, Weezer, Drake, and MGMT. Other acts appearing included 100 Monkeys, Four Year Strong, the Aquabats, Escape the Fate, Saves the Day, Angels & Airwaves, VersaEmerge, the Pretty Reckless, Relient K, Hanson, the Maine, Bullet for my Valentine, Something Corporate, Honor Bright, Joe Brooks, the Ready Set, Paper Tongues, the Word Alive, Of Mice & Men, Asking Alexandria, the Bled, Protest the Hero, Emmure, Title Fight, My Favorite Highway, Allstar Weekend, Miss May I, Gegen Mech, We Came as Romans, I See Stars, Chiodos, Attack Attack!, Architects, Tanya Morgan, T. Mills, Far East Movement, Dirt Nasty, I Set My Friends on Fire, Mike Posner, Spose, Jason Bishop, Justin Kredible, MC Mr. Napkins, Owen Benjamin, Eclectic Method, All the Day Holiday, Bobby Long, Nigel Pilkington, Dan Russell and Emma Tate, Stephen Jerzak, Moneybrother, the Nightlife, All The Day Holiday, Steel Train, OK Go, the Devil Wears Prada, Minus the Bear, Say Anything, Matt & Kim, the Summer Set, Hey Monday, Fun., Never Shout Never, Kesha, Motion City Soundtrack, Mutemath, Girl Talk, Sainthood Reps, the Parlor Mob, Polar Bear Club, Good Old War, the Dear Hunter, Foxy Shazam, Piebald, Every Avenue, Mod Sun, the Dig, MC Chris, the Joy Formidable, Francis and the Lights, Kevin Devine, Grieves, Samuel Adams Wisner, Sean Price, Spose, Wiz Khalifa, Wale, 88-Keys, Canyon, Rory Scovel, Eugene Mirman, Arj Barker, Eclectic Method, Beyond Redemption, Gabriel the Marine, Twin Atlantic, Moving Mountains, Lovedrug, the Morning Of, Young the Giant, Eye Alaska, Wild International, and Rhubarb Jones.

The Bamboozle Chicago took place on May 15, 2010, at Charter One Pavilion in Chicago. Bands appearing included All the Day Holiday, Kill Hannah, Travie McCoy and the Lazarus Project, 3OH!3, Cobra Starship, Something Corporate, I Fight Dragons, the Lifelines, Jump Smokers, Spose, Treaty of Paris, and Allister.

==== Bamboozle Road Show 2010 ====
The Bamboozle Road Show ran for 26 dates from May 21, 2010, until June 27, 2010. Headliners of the tour were All Time Low, Boys Like Girls, LMFAO, and Third Eye Blind. All Time Low was removed from the lineup for three dates after criticizing the way their fans were treated at a previous show when some fans were pepper sprayed by police for fighting over a T-shirt thrown into the crowd.

=== The Bamboozle 2011 ===
The Bamboozle 2011 took place from April 29 to May 1, 2011, over 10 stages at the new Meadowlands Sports Complex in East Rutherford, New Jersey. Artists appearing on the line-up included Sam Adams, the Ready Set, LMFAO, Thirty Seconds to Mars, 2AM Club, Mayday Parade, Travie McCoy, Wiz Khalifa, the Downtown Fiction, Rx Bandits, Thrice, New Found Glory, Marky Ramone, Lions Lions, Arsonists Get All the Girls, Motionless in White, Carnifex, Oceano, Forever the Sickest Kids, Ryan Cabrera, Boyz II Men, Dev, wait what, the Devil's Holiday, Nigel Pilkington, Dan Russell and Emma Tate, Ninjasonik, Neon Hitch, Chiddy Bang, New Boyz, Jay Pharoah, David Garibaldi, We Are the In Crowd, State Radio, Anberlin, Tokyo Police Club, Thrice, Circa Survive, Dashboard Confessional, Taking Back Sunday, Plain White T's, Rx Bandits, Streetlight Manifesto, Alkaline Trio, New Found Glory, the Gaslight Anthem, Hank & Cupcakes, O'Brother, An Horse, River City Extension, Frank Turner, the Movielife, Sleeper Agent, Tigers Jaw, Transit, Gatsbys American Dream, Abandon All Ships, A Loss for Words, Breathe Carolina, Sleeping With Sirens, Vanna, E-Town Concrete, Animals as Leaders, Alter the Ending, the Ready Set, Voted Most Random, Alex York, Kevin Hammond, Andy Grammer, Action Item, wait what, the Hood Internet, Tropidelic, Vic Mensa, Rockie Fresh, Wax, T. Mills, Hoodie Allen, Das Racist, Big K.R.I.T., Lil B, XV, Liz Lee, Bo Burnham, Black Cards, Black Veil Brides, Attack Attack!, Jack's Mannequin, A Day to Remember, Lil Wayne, the Ready Set, I See Stars, the Downtown Fiction, Senses Fail, Fuel, We the Kings, Bruno Mars, Mötley Crüe, Tonight Alive, Man Overboard, Runner Runner, Valencia, I Am the Avalanche, Eisley, Further Seems Forever, Eat Me Raw, the Limousines, Mike Del Rio, Conditions, Within the Ruins, Chelsea Grin, Upon A Burning Body, Veil of Maya, After the Burial, Born of Osiris, For Today, Darkness Descends, Insane Clown Posse, Cady Groves, Young Hollywood, Wolfgang Gartner, Killer Mike, Freddie Gibbs, Machine Gun Kelly, Diggy Simmons, Pusha T, Big Sean, Hannibal Buress, The Son of Leeds, and Tim Minchin.

The Bamboozle Roadshow 2011 was scheduled to take place from May 4 to June 10, 2011, featuring Chiddy Bang, Dev, Ninjasonik, and Pusha T. However, the tour was cancelled before it started.

=== The Bamboozle 2012 ===
On November 7, 2011, John D'Esposito, the founder, tweeted a picture from Asbury Park, New Jersey, hinting that the festival would return there to celebrate its 10-year anniversary. This was later confirmed on the festival website. The festival took place from May 18–20, 2012, with Incubus, Foo Fighters, Mac Miller, Skrillex, Bon Jovi, Brand New and My Chemical Romance as the headliners. Originally Blink-182 were due to perform, but were replaced by My Chemical Romance when Blink-182 cancelled due to Travis Barker's medical issues. Bamboozle refused to accept refunds after Blink-182 pulled out. In 2012, Bamboozle offered had contactless admission with wristbands using RFID technology.

Other artists appearing at the event included Mike Posner, We Came as Romans, the Receiving End of Sirens, Armor for Sleep, Volbeat, Stray from the Path, Miss May I, Cavalcade of the Odd, Whitechapel, The Wonder Years, Anamanaguchi, Timeflies, David Garibaldi, Kreayshawn, Big Freedia & the Divas, the Maine, Never Shout Never, the All-American Rejects, Jimmy Eat World, the Story So Far, Motion City Soundtrack, Boysetsfire, Anti-Flag, Less Than Jake, Hot Water Music, the Promise Ring, Motion City Soundtrack, MyChildren MyBride, Close Your Eyes, Attila, Periphery, Emmure, We Came as Romans, He Is We, Datsik, DJ Pauly D, the Knocks, Mr. Muthafuckin' eXquire, Iggy Azalea, Action Bronson, ASAP Rocky, Powerglove, A Great Big Pile of Leaves, the Dear Hunter, James McCartney, Cherri Bomb, Michael Monroe, the Protomen, Marianas Trench, Boys Like Girls, Sammy Adams, Buckcherry, the Gaslight Anthem, Folly, Bayside, Murphy's Law, Comeback Kid, Catch 22, the Bouncing Souls, Obey the Brave, Texas in July, Woe, Is Me, Alesana, Make Me Famous, Star Slinger, T. Mills, Outasight, Nigel Pilkington, Dan Russell and Emma Tate, Deas Vail, Spacehog, Dramarama, and Andrew Dice Clay.

=== Departure of John D'Esposito and end of the festival ===
In 2012, festival creator John D'Esposito. announced that he was no longer a part of Bamboozle due to creative differences with Live Nation and House of Blues. He later clarified in an interview that while he was disappointed in Live Nation's support of the festival, "It wasn't LiveNation that did this – House of Blues did. House of Blues is 100% responsible for the damage of Bamboozle."

=== Return of John D'Esposito and 2023 revival of the festival ===
In 2021, John D'Esposito reacquired the rights and trademarks of Bamboozle from Live Nation. He mentioned May 5 to 7, 2023 as the date the festival would be held in a New Jersey location. In 2022, it was stated that the location would be Bader Field in Atlantic City.

The rebooted festival was allegedly scheduled for Bader Field in May 2023, with acts including E-Town Concrete, Coi Leray, Ice Spice, Trippie Redd, Limp Bizkit, A Boogie Wit da Hoodie, and Papa Roach.

The 2023 event, to be held May 5-7, was canceled only one week prior. This is partly due to lies surrounding the lineup, false claims that Black Friday sale prices would be the cheapest way to purchase tickets, and lying about the amount of tickets sold.

== Bamboozle Left ==
Bamboozle Left was an annual two-day music festival held in California from 2006 to 2009, based on The Bamboozle festival on the Atlantic coast.
