= Gabriel the Marine =

US musical group

- Origin: Lattingtown, New York, Long Island, New York, United States
- Genres: Indie rock; alternative rock
- Years active: 2008–2014
- Members: Michael Desmond; Dylan Ebrahimian; Dominick D'Agostino; Thomas Costa; Thomas Davis
- Website: http://www.myspace.com/gabrielthemarine

Gabriel the Marine was an American rock band from Long Island, New York. The band was composed of guitarist and vocalist Mike Desmond and guitarist Dominick D'Agostino, bassist Tom Costa, and drummer Tom Davis. Following its inception into the independent rock scene in 2008, the band embarked on their first U.S. tour in the summer of 2009 with A Love Like Pi and Asteria, and later opened for artists such as Taking Back Sunday, Mew, Glassjaw, Jack's Mannequin, The Sleeping, As Tall As Lions, Bayside, Mae, Anberlin, I Am the Avalanche, The Dear Hunter, and many others. Thomas Davis has since gotten a job for Sachem Central School District and occasionally switches schools such as Sachem East High School, Sachem North High School, and Seneca Middle School.

The band was known for its leanings towards jazz and classical orchestrations.

== History ==
=== Formation and self-titled demo ===
The newly formed project recorded their self-titled demo in 2008. Shortly following the recording process, Craig Kleila and John Leibold left the band to move away to college. Once the demo was released, it attracted the attention of Neil Rubenstein, a Long Island musician who had performed with the Glassjaw precursor Sons of Abraham and sung on the first two Taking Back Sunday albums. Rubenstein first helped the band secure radio play on K Rock (92.3 FM), and began booking the band soon after through Sons Modern (a booking agency created by Rubenstein and Justin Beck of Glassjaw). In May 2009, the band announced that they would perform at the Bamboozle Festival at the Meadowlands in New Jersey with artists such as No Doubt, Taking Back Sunday, The Get Up Kids, and many others. They were also featured in Spin magazine as "One of 15-Must Hear Bands at Bamboozle Fest" and called them "Jimmy Eat World meets The Decemberists".

=== Your Friends and Loved Ones EP ===
In May 2009, after the band played the Bamboozle Festival, they retreated to VuDu Studios in Freeport, New York to record their follow up EP with producer Mike Watts (As Tall As Lions, The Almost, As Cities Burn). They announced that the album would be called Your Friends and Loved Ones due to the fact that family and friends are what supported and continue to support the band through its endeavors. After the recording process was over, the band embarked on two small tours; one with Destry and The Narrative, the other with The Forecast. In August, the band completed their first United States tour with the pop-punk tinged bands Asteria and Theatre Breaks Loose and the indie-electro tinged A Love Like Pi.

Following their summer tour, the band opened for The Dear Hunter and later The Sleeping in September. It was at this time that the band released the five-song Your Friends and Loved Ones EP, to critical acclaim. Absolutepunk.net stated that the album was "phenomenal post emo orchestral rock", and users gave it a 92% rating. The newspaper Newsday called it "Post-emo orchestral tenderness combined with well-crafted storytelling". The last track off of the EP, "The Ocean", was featured on Keeping Up with the Kardashians.

In October, the band performed at the CMJ Music Marathon in New York City, and soon after was named by Purevolume.com as "One of the Top 20 Unsigned Artists of 2009". Purevolume then released a live EP entitled Gabriel the Marine: Live From the Purevolume House.

By December 2009 the band won a contest to open for the Danish post rock band Mew during a part of their North American tour. Later in the month, rumors began circulating that the influential post hardcore band, Glassjaw (also from Long Island), would be playing at Maxwell's in Hoboken, New Jersey as a part of the Sons Modern Christmas Party. Gabriel opened the show along with Bad Rabbits, Robbers, and Sainthood Reps.

In January 2010 the band embarked on an east coast tour with John Nolan (of Straylight Run and Taking Back Sunday fame) and Ocean is Theory. Soon after, bassist Robbie Hassett was kicked out of the band.

=== Stars Collecting EP ===
In May 2010 the band played at the Bamboozle Festival at the Meadowlands in New Jersey with headliners Paramore, Weezer, MGMT, and Drake. They performed on the Aquarian Stage with similar artists All the Day Holiday and Moving Mountains. Soon after they completed a north east tour with the Maryland-based band Hotspur.

In June 2010, the acclaimed alternative rock band Taking Back Sunday announced that Gabriel would be opening up for them during their June tour at the Metro in Chicago. Soon after this, the band announced that they had been writing an album slated to be released sometime in 2011. They entered the studio in January 2011 with producer Jim Wirt to begin recording. The project was largely funded by fans via a Kickstarter campaign initiated by the band. After several delays, the Stars Collecting EP was finally released on October 30, 2012. Gabriel the Marine also announced the upcoming release of an album in 2013.

Their music was also featured on Kourtney and Kim Take New York, a reality TV show.

== Band members ==
=== Current ===
- Michael Desmond (vocals, guitar)
- Dominick D'Agostino (guitar) (2009–present)
- Thomas Costa (bass) (2011–present)
- Thomas Davis (drums) (2009–present)

=== Former ===
- Craig Kleila (guitar) (2008–2009)
- John Leibold (drums) (2008–2009)
- Mark Herburger (bass) (2008–2009)
- Robbie Hassett (bass) (2009)
- Jesse Lyons(Bass) (2009–2010)

== Discography ==
- Gabriel the Marine Demo (2008)
- Your Friends and Loved Ones (EP, 2009)
- Stars Collecting (EP, 2012)
- Songs for the Endtime (2014)

== Videography ==
- The Gold Coast, 2008/2010
