= Moving Mountains =

Moving Mountains may refer to:

- Moving Mountains (band), an American indie rock and post-rock band
  - Moving Mountains (Moving Mountains album), 2013
  - Moving Mountains (EP), a 2006 EP by Moving Mountains
- Moving Mountains (Justin Hayward album), 1985
- Moving Mountains (The Casket Lottery album), 2000
- "Moving Mountains" (song), a song by American R&B singer Usher

== See also ==
- Moving the Mountain (disambiguation)
