= If These Streets Could Talk =

Studio album by Just Surrender
- Released: 12 July 2005
- Recorded: 2005
- Studio: Nada, New Windsor, New York
- Genre: Pop punk, emo, post-hardcore
- Length: 36:41
- Label: Broken English Records
- Producer: John Naclerio

Just Surrender chronology
Just Surrender EP (2005)	If These Streets Could Talk (2005)	We're in Like Sin (2007)

Professional ratings
Review scores
Source	Rating
Melodic	3/5 stars
Punknews.org	2/5 stars

If These Streets Could Talk is the debut album by Dover Place rock band Just Surrender (at the time of initial release known as A Second Chance). The artwork was done by haymakerprint.com. The band recorded two videos from this album, "Tell Me Everything" and "I Can Barely Breathe." This is the first CD on their label, Broken English Records. The album was produced by John Naclerio, who was already known for his work with bands such as Brand New and Senses Fail.

== Release ==
Just Surrender toured the East Coast with Bayside and the Junior Varsity in May 2005. They went on a West Coast tour with Nural in August 2005. They followed this with an appearance at CMJ Music Marathon, and a two-month US cross-country tour with My American Heart, October Fall, and Lorene Drive. In November 2005, they toured with Days Like These and Paint by Numbers. They closed out the year with Scary Kids Scaring Kids and June on the Too Cold for School tour. They supported Paulson on their headlining US tour in January 2006. In May 2006, they performed with Boys Night Out on their US tour, and appeared at The Bamboozle festival. In August 2006, the band supported the Audition on their headlining US tour.

== Track listing ==
All tracks are written by Just Surrender.

No.	Title	Length
1.	"I Can Barely Breathe"	3:35
2.	"Of All We've Known"	3:26
3.	"Tell Me Everything"	3:11
4.	"In Your Silence"	3:51
5.	"Our Work Of Art"	3:58
6.	"What We've Become"	3:14
7.	"You Tell a Tale"	4:28
8.	"Forgotten Not Forgiven"	3:36
9.	"Is There No Truth in Beauty?"	4:02
10.	"She Broke My Heart, So I Broke His Jaw"	3:15
Total length:		36:41

Japanese bonus track
No.	Title	Length
14.	"Which Burns More"	4:07

== Personnel ==
Just Surrender

- Jason Maffucci – bass guitar, vocals
- Dan Simons – rhythm guitar, vocals
- Andrew Meunier – lead guitar, backing vocals
- Steve Miller – drums

Additional musicians

- Zack Roach – guitar
- John Collura – piano

Production

- John Naclerio – producer, mixing, mastering
- Chris Hughes – producer
- Rob Kucharek logo design
