= Waves (Moving Mountains album) =

Studio album by Moving Mountains
- Released: May 11, 2011
- Recorded: October–December 2010
- Studio: Murder House Studio, Glow in The Dark Studios
- Genre: Post-hardcore, emo, post-rock
- Length: 40:26
- Label: Triple Crown Records
- Producer: Gregory Dunn

Moving Mountains chronology
| Foreword EP (2008) | Waves (2011) |

Professional ratings
Review scores
| Source | Rating |
|---|---|
| Sputnikmusic | 2.5/5 stars |

Waves is the second album by the band Moving Mountains. It was released on May 11, 2011, on Triple Crown Records. The band has stated that Triple Crown Records gave them full freedom to record and write the album as they pleased. The lyrics were written by Gregory Dunn, some of which, like Pneuma, were written about his friend who had died and touch on Dunn's existential questions of faith and existence. He has stated that this is the last album with lyrics about his deceased friend. After the success of Pneuma and the band's lifestyle shift to touring, their primary artistic vision for Waves was to create an album that would reflect how they played live. Additionally, lead vocalist Dunn said, "Our goal with Waves was to have someone be engaged from the start to the end." Although the album borrows directly from their previous work on Pneuma and Foreword, the band has described the album as athematic, "un-poetic and almost clumsy, [but] really honest."

== Track listing ==
All tracks are written by Moving Mountains, with additional lyrics for tracks 1, 3, 7 and 8 by Frank Graniero.

| No. | Title | Length |
|---|---|---|
| 1. | "My Life Is A Chase Dream (And I'm Still Having Chase Dreams)" | 3:31 |
| 2. | "Where Two Bodies Lie" | 4:17 |
| 3. | "Tired Tiger" | 4:31 |
| 4. | "The Cascade" (additional vocals by Kenny Bridges) | 4:44 |
| 5. | "Once Rendering" | 3:55 |
| 6. | "Always Only For Me" | 3:50 |
| 7. | "Alleviate" | 2:56 |
| 8. | "Parts In Different Places" | 3:43 |
| 9. | "Furnace Woods" | 3:11 |
| 10. | "Full Circle" | 5:51 |

== Personnel ==
Moving Mountains members

- Gregory Dunn - lead vocals, guitar, trombone
- Nicholas Pizzolato - drums
- Mitchell Lee - bass
- Joshua Kirby - guitar, backing vocals
- Frank Graniero - guitar, vocals

Additional personnel

- Caitlin Grace Bailey - cello
- Kenny Bridges - additional vocals
- Sam Kaufman - art direction, design
- Mark Jourdian - management
- Cody Delong - booking
- Mike Kalajian - mastering
- Matt Goldman - mixing
- Rob Pizzolato - photography
