= Jason Bishop =

American magician

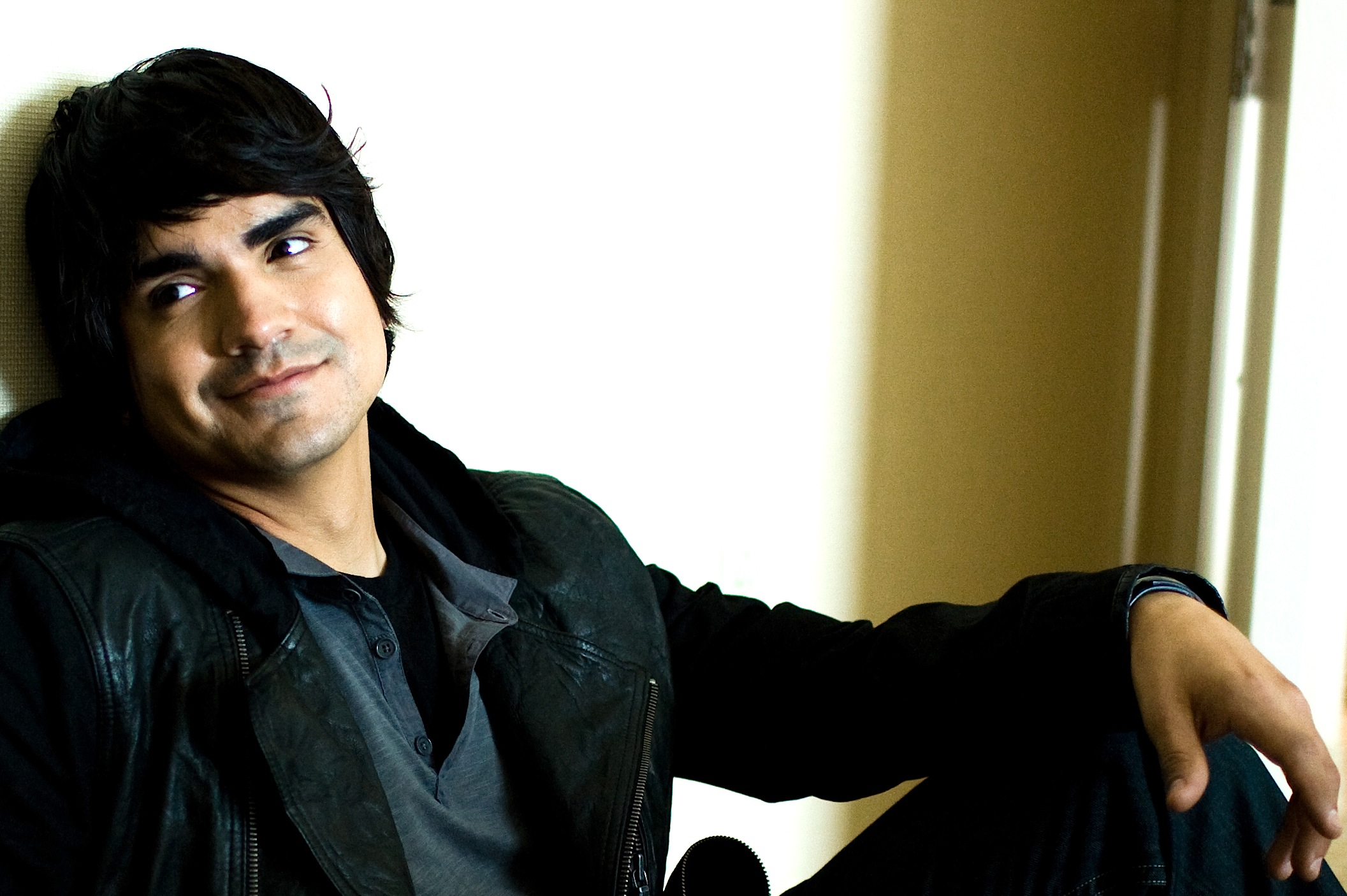
- Bishop in 2009
- Born: Jasane Castro; January 23, 1978 (age 48); Newark, New Jersey, U.S.
- Occupations: Magician, illusionist
- Website: TheJasonBishopShow.com

Jason Bishop (born Jasane Castro; January 23, 1978) is an American illusionist and magician, and performs one of the largest touring magic and illusion shows in the United States. Bishop has won a number of awards in magic, including the Jack Gwynne award for Excellence in Presentation and was the 2006 Association for the Promotion of Campus Activities (APCA) Best Performing Artist of the Year. Bishop performs an average of 150 shows a year, including luxury cruise ships, performing arts centers, theaters, and corporate events. He has done performances throughout the United States and Europe and has been called "one of the greatest modern illusionists of our time".

== Early years and education ==
Bishop was born Jasane Castro on January 23, 1978 in Newark, New Jersey to Josefina Castro Hernandez. He and several of his siblings were placed in St. Joseph's Orphanage in Philadelphia at a very young age. After living in the orphanage for some time, Bishop and his siblings entered the foster care system and were placed in several foster homes throughout Pennsylvania, including Philadelphia, Easton, Fleetwood, Leesport, and Allentown. Bishop continued to be moved from foster home to foster home until he was 18 years old, developing an interest in magic during this time. He went to libraries to find books on magic and illusions and began teaching himself small magic tricks and card manipulations. Bishop then began to attend the International Brotherhood of Magicians (I.B.M.) Ring 32 meetings in Allentown, furthering his interest and knowledge in magic and illusions.

Bishop attended Salisbury High School in Salisbury Township, Pennsylvania and Fleetwood Area High School, in Fleetwood, Pennsylvania. At the age of 15, in the 9th grade, Bishop began performing at birthday parties and holiday gatherings, as well as for friends and other small audiences. It was in his senior year at Fleetwood High that Bishop met Kim Hess and began working with her as his assistant. Bishop went on to attend Kutztown University of Pennsylvania, as a theater major, but did not complete a degree. He continued to develop as a magician and began performing larger shows and larger illusions.

== Career ==
Bishop and his assistant, Hess, promoted themselves as a touring magic and illusion show. To jump start their career while still attending college, they sent demo tapes to a number of resorts in the Poconos area, including Caesar's resorts, and Woodloch Pines, among others. From these demo tapes, Bishop began booking shows at several resorts. As more bookers became aware of the new duo, they started getting booked at colleges and universities. Today, Bishop mainly performs at larger venues in cities all over the United States, as well as on Disney Cruise Line and Celebrity Cruises. Bishop has performed at The Bamboozle Festival at venues such as the Midland Arena, in Midland, TX, the famous Magic Castle in Hollywood, CA, the US Naval Academy, and the US Coast Guard Academy.

Although Bishop is not the only grand illusionist in the genre and has competition such as David Copperfield and Criss Angel, he does currently have one of the largest touring illusion show, as well as illusions performed by few others. Bishop also uses more humor in his shows than most illusionists, as well as a number of unique illusions, ranging in type from challenge magic to close-up magic, to manipulation magic. Throughout the performance, he invites a number of audience members, children and adults, to come onstage and assist in illusions. Bishop's show also contains a large amount of technologically advanced equipment, including plasma and LCD TV screens, iPods and iPhones, and a modern rock and pop music soundtrack that is continuously changing. With the use of modern technology and equipment, Bishop is often billed as "America's Hottest Illusionist".

== Awards ==
- Magician Alliance of Eastern States, Stage Award and Originality Award
- The Jack Gwynne award for Excellence in Presentation
- 2006 APCA Best Performing Artist of the Year

== Notable illusions ==
- Double levitation (Bishop is the only illusionist to tour with one)
- Changes $1 bill into a $100 bill and gives to an audience member to keep
- Bounces cards 30 feet off the stage into the audience
- Jim Steinmeyer’s creation Through a Jail Window
- Live goldfish emerges from iPod touch

== Current tour ==
There are 15 illusions in the current tour of The Jason Bishop Show, including illusions not performed by any other illusionist, such as a double levitation, and Plasma illusion, The tour travels all over the country.

Jason is performing on the Celebrity Solstice as of May 2016 and will be featured on CW's upcoming Masters of Illusion series.

Jason Bishop is exclusively represented by Robin Klinger Entertainment.
