= Voted Most Random =

American pop punk band

- Origin: Hamden, Connecticut
- Genres: Pop punk, alternative rock, powerpop
- Years active: 2010–2013
- Labels: [Unsigned]
- Members: Ian Reibeisen; Chris Weiss; Joe Mauti
- Website: Official website

Voted Most Random is an American pop punk band formed in 2010 from Hamden, Connecticut. Although currently unsigned, the band is making a name for themselves on the East Coast in states like Connecticut, New York, New Jersey, Rhode Island, Massachusetts, Delaware and New Hampshire. In April 2010 they played a benefit concert for The Clearwater Initiative with pop punk quartet We The Kings at Toad's Place in New Haven, Connecticut raising over $11,000 for the cause. The group released their E.P. debut album in 2010, which debuted at their sold out CD release show at The Space in Hamden, CT. The band then went on to earn spots on both the 2010 Warped Tour and The Bamboozle Festival in 2011. On February 23, 2011 Voted Most Random was featured in the New Haven Register's "make a playlist" series. In the summer of 2011, the band's popular hit "Party Naked" was featured in the pop punk compilation CD "The Scene-you just need to know where to look," released by Pacific Ridge Records.

Voted Most Random has made appearances on the radio shows of both WQAQ and Ransack Radio and has since been highlighted in online reviews and newspapers like The New York Times, The New Haven Register, Noisetrend.com, hercampus.com, and stamfordplus.com. After a series of summer "mini-tours" Voted Most Random is looking to record their first full-length album in Winter 2011.

== Tours ==
Voted Most Random played their fifth show ever on the Kevin Says Stage at Warped Tour 2010 after coming in first at the East Coast Indie 2010 Battle of the Bands. The band shared this stage with female rock sensation Juliet Simms and her band Automatic Loveletter (also made famous on The Voice).

In Winter of 2010, the band earned spots in the lineup of both the "A Very Glamour Kills Holiday Fest" and the "Glamour Kills Tour." Both events took place at The Chance Theater in Poughkeepsie, NY and featured nationally touring acts like Hit The Lights, We Are The in Crowd, The Ready Set, and Every Avenue.

On April 30, 2011 Voted Most Random played on the Aquarian Stage at The Bamboozle Festival at the new Meadowlands Sports Complex in East Rutherford, New Jersey. The festival was headlined by A Day To Remember and Lil Wayne.

Later in 2011, Voted Most Random was featured in the lineup of the So Last Summer Festival in Cambridge, Massachusetts at The Middle East venue along with The Cab and Fearless Records' Sparks the Rescue and Hopeless Records' new addition: Divided by Friday.

== Members ==
- Ian Reibeisen – Lead Vocals
- Chris Weiss – Rhythm Guitar
- Joe Mauti – Bass guitar

== Former members ==
- Bennett Pisaniello – Rhythm Guitar
- Sal Salemme – Drums
- Scott Gunter – Guitar
- Brendan Amoruso - Manager

== Discography ==
- Everything You Want And More (2010)

Produced by Rob Freeman (The Pilot Studio)

01. Hot Mess
02. A Beautiful You
03. Party Naked
04. Here I Go
05. Everything You Want and More
06. Tik Tok (Kesha cover)
07. Your Ex, My Ex

- Singles

Who's Your Romeo
Your Mom Thinks I'm Cute
Almost Famous
All Year Holiday

== Compilation albums ==
- The Scene - You just Have to Know where to Look (2011)

(Pacific Ridge Records)

1. Young Hollywood – Lust at First Sight 03:16
2. Avian Sunrise – Unspoken 03:41
3. Time Will Tell – Spine 04:03
4. The Call Out – Over It 02:36
5. Voted Most Random – Party Naked 02:55
6. Move Out West – Sink With You 04:42
7. Floral Terrace – Late Nights, Bright Lights 03:41
8. The Night Life – Getter! 03:05
9. Asteria – Hold On 03:20
10. The Lion Faced Boy – 1993 03:41
11. The Catastrophe – Emotional Debris 02:34
12. Still Rings True – All We Need 04:12
13. The Republic of Wolves – Greek Fire 05:43
14. My Arcadia – September 2:53
15. The Body Rampant – Sativa 03:45
16. The Ethnographers – Lovers and Lines 04:23
17. The Orphan, The Poet – To Those Called Icarus 04:15
18. The World Concave – Loom 04:22
19. Jesse Ponnock – Am I Wrong 03:46
20. Joe Wilson – Severed 04:08
21. Washington Square Park – Material Hell 02:00

== Awards ==
Year	Award	Result
2010	East Coast Indie Battle of the Bands	Won
2010	A Very Glamour Kills Holiday BOTB-The Adam Lopez Presents	Won
2011	The Bamboozle Break Contest	Won
