= Monoculture (disambiguation) =

Monoculture is the practice of growing one crop species in a field at a time.

Monoculture may also refer to:

- Monoculture (computer science), community of computers that all run the same software
- Monoculture (popular culture), concept where everyone experiences facets of popular culture at once
- Monoculturalism, policy or process of endorsing a single social or ethnic group
- Monoculture (album), debut album by Sainthood Reps
