= The High Court (band) =

US musical group

- Origin: Mount Holly, New Jersey, U.S.
- Genres: Pop punk
- Years active: 2005–2008; 2022-
- Labels: I Surrender Records
- Members: Ben Roth; Kyle Shellhammer (Shell); Denny Carvell; John Browne (JB); Mike Matranga
- Past members: Lou Cuello
- Website: www.thehighcourtrock.com

The High Court was an American pop punk band from Mount Holly, New Jersey. They released one full studio album, Puppet Strings in 2007, before disbanding in June 2008. The band made a comeback in 2022.

== History ==
The High Court's name is an alternate acronym for THC, the psychoactive substance found in marijuana. The group formed in 2005 from the remnants of several local metal acts. Members Lou Cuello, Kyle Shellhammer, and Denny Carvell placed an ad for the remaining spots on Myspace, and formed The High Court after John Brown answered the ad. They signed to I Surrender Records and released their debut album, Puppet Strings, in mid-2007. The group played the Warped Tour to support the album. Lou Cuello left the group in September 2007. In late 2007 and early 2008 they toured with 2*Sweet, Fireworks, Bedlight for Blue Eyes, and Asteria. The High Court disbanded in June 2008. The band stated that some of the members are going to be starting other projects in the future. The band announced in November 2022 that they're releasing new music.

JB is currently singing for the New Jersey band Bright and Early. Shellhammer is the bassist for Just Surrender.

=== Members ===
- Ben Roth – guitar
- Kyle Shellhammer (Shell) – bass
- Denny Carvell – drums
- John Browne (JB) – vocals
- Mike Matranga – guitar

=== Previous members ===
- Lou Cuello – guitar

== Discography ==
- Puppet Strings (I Surrender Records, July 2007)
- Rico Christmas (I Surrender Records, December 2022)
