= It's About Love =

It's About Love may refer to:

- "It's About Love", a song by En Vogue from EV3 (1997)
- "It's About Love", a song by The Medic Droid from their self-titled album (2008)
- "It's About Love", a song sung by Wynonna Judd in the VeggieTales video "Lord of the Beans" (2005)
- "It's About Love", an episode of the American legal drama 100 Centre Street
