= We're in Like Sin =

Studio album by Just Surrender
- Released: 21 August 2007
- Recorded: Nada Recording Studios, New Windsor, NY
- Genre: Pop punk, post-hardcore, power pop, emo
- Length: 35:24
- Label: Broken English
- Producer: John Naclerio

Just Surrender chronology
| If These Streets Could Talk (2005) | We're in Like Sin (2007) | Stronger Now EP (2009) |

Professional ratings
Review scores
| Source | Rating |
|---|---|
| AbsolutePunk | 75/100 |
| Melodic | 3.5/5 stars |
| Punknews.org | 2.5/5 stars |
| Sputnikmusic | 2.5/5 |
| Wonka Vision | 3/5 |

We're in Like Sin is the second album from Just Surrender. The first single for this album is "Your Life And Mine". It was recorded by John Naclerio and mixed by Dan Coutant.

== Release ==
In May and June 2007, Just Surrender went on tour with Set Your Goals, Fireworks, and Driving East. We're in Like Sin was released on August 21, 2007, through label Broken English Records. In September, the group went on the School's for Fools tour across the US, alongside Valencia, We the Kings and Metro Station. However, partway through the tour Valencia had to drop off the tour due to their vocalist Shane Henderson having strep throat. As a result, Just Surrender headlined the rest of the dates. In March and April 2008, the band supported A Day to Remember on their headlining tour of the US. In July 2008, the band performed on the 2008 edition of Warped Tour. In October and November, the band went on tour alongside the Higher, the Morning Of and the White Tie Affair.

== Track listing ==
1. "Body Language and Bad Habits"
2. "So Close / So Alive"
3. "If I Wanted To Cuddle I'd Buy a Teddy Bear"
4. "I Said it Before"
5. "Your Life and Mine"
6. "New Declaration"
7. "Payback"
8. "You'd Be in Great Shape If You Ran Like Your Mouth" [feat. Colin Ross of Hit The Lights]
9. "We're In Like Sin"
10. "Something That I'm Not"
11. "I'll Be Here"
12. "Medicate Myself" (iTunes Bonus Track/Japanese Edition Bonus Track)
13. "In Your Silence [Acoustic]" (iTunes Bonus Track)
