= Puppet Strings (The High Court album) =

Studio album by The High Court
- Released: July 24, 2007
- Studio: Ozone Recording, Shorefire Recording
- Genre: Alternative, Pop rock, Powerpop
- Length: 43:20
- Label: I Surrender Records
- Producer: Rich Cox

Puppet Strings is a 2007 album by American band The High Court.

Professional ratings
Review scores
| Source | Rating |
|---|---|
| AllMusic | 3.0/5 stars |
| Driven Far Off | 8.5/10 stars |

== Track listing ==
1. "Puppet Strings"
2. "2 Much Love for 1 Woman"
3. "The Refresher Course"
4. "Whisper to the Clouds"
5. "In Bambi's Eyes"
6. "Heaven On The Horizon"
7. "Alien"
8. "Payback"
9. "She'll Never Know"
10. "After the Climax"
11. "Like a Ghost"
12. "Down in Flames"
