= Montalban Hotel =

- Parent company: East West Records
- Genre: Rock
- Country of origin: US
- Official website: www.montalbanhotel.com

Montalban Hotel is a part of the EastWest Records family of labels.

== Artists ==
- Pistolita

== See also ==
- List of record labels
