= Alex York =

American singer-songwriter

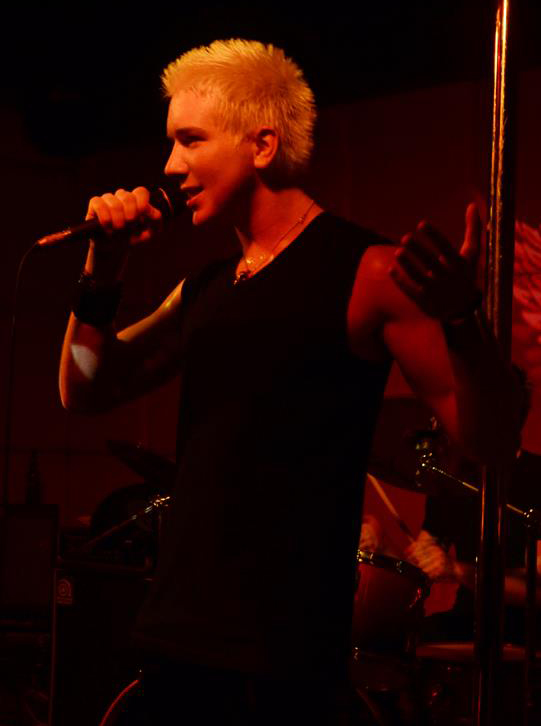
- Alex York performing live at the 2011 CMJ Music Marathon

Background information
- Born: New York City, New York, United States
- Genres: Pop, Glam rock
- Occupations: Singer-songwriter, media personality, author
- Years active: 2010–present
- Website: alexyork.com

Alex York is an American writer, musician, and Japanese media personality. He writes and sings in English and Japanese.

== Biography ==
=== Personal life ===
York was born and raised in New York City, where he currently resides. York is fluent in Japanese. He began studying Japanese as a self-study while at the Collegiate School and majored in Japanese literature at Yale University.

=== Music ===
As a musician, York is known for his lively, theatrical shows, where he and his band members wear colorful stage outfits and accoutrements. "I draw a lot from Japan," York has said, "from the tradition of putting on masks, putting on kimonos, wearing swords, to engender a sort of theatrical persona that the audience will enjoy."

He was called a "rock star in the making" by Time Out New York in November 2010.

In 2011, his album Tokyo Heartbreak was released. The title track was nominated for the 2011 Hollywood Music in Media award for Pop Song of the Year.

Also in 2011, he performed at New York's CMJ Music Marathon & Film Festival, as well as at The Bamboozle, a three-day music festival held annually in New Jersey. Nearly 100,000 people attended that year's festival, which featured around 200 acts. York was singled out in The Star-Ledger's review of the festival, where he was praised for being "on the rise" and playing "a spirited set of glam-influenced pop" to an "enthusiastic crowd."

Since launching in 2010, York has gathered in excess of 80,000 Instagram followers, 60,000 Twitter followers, and 90,000 Facebook fans. He has received a YouTube Honor for being the #43 all-time most subscribed musician among Japanese viewers (as of February 2012).

York donates a portion of his profits to Japan disaster relief from the 2011 tsunami.

In 2012, York released the single "Change", sung primarily in Japanese, about his hope for a swift recovery from the disaster. The song ranked #19 on the iTunes Japan pop chart and #2 on the Amazon Japan pop chart. As of April 2013, its music video on YouTube has been viewed over 750,000 times.

In the same year, he released the single "American Boy", based on his travel experiences in Japan. "American Boy" reached #8 on the iTunes Japan pop chart and #1 on the Amazon Japan pop chart. The music video for the song has attained over 2,000,000 views on YouTube as of December 2013.

York appeared as the finale act at a charity concert for the "TOMODACHI Summer 2012 Celebration", sponsored by the United States government and the US-Japan Council, in September 2012. He performed songs in Japanese and English for the audience, which included then-Foreign Minister of Japan Kōichirō Genba and students from the 2011 tsunami disaster afflicted region of Tōhoku.

As of January 2013, York is ranked #9 on New York pop charts on ReverbNation.

At the 2013 Hollywood Media in Music Awards (HMMA), York's rock ballad "I Don't Care" was nominated for Alternative Song of the Year, and his dance pop number "Push and Pull" received a nomination for Best Pop Song of the Year.

=== Theater ===
At an event at The Copacabana celebrating Hair co-author James Rado’s 80th birthday, York was selected to be a part of the cast performing excerpts from Rado's latest musical, American Soldier.

=== Television ===
York appears regularly on Japanese television news programs FCI Morning Eye and FCI News Catch!, broadcast by Fujisankei Communications Group on its American branch, FCI. Speaking in Japanese as well as English, he hosts segments relating to music, travel, and food. York's music is featured in the soundtracks of his programs.

=== Writings ===
From 2019 to 2020, York contributed a series of articles published on the official website of MTV Japan, where he taught English through his music.

In September 2020, he released the English education book Momotarō wo Utau dake de Eigo ga Hanaseru (Sing Momotaro, Speak English), published by Kadokawa.

In June 2023, York's writing and English education techniques were featured in a special edition of Japanese magazine President Family.

== Discography ==
=== Albums ===
- Tokyo Heartbreak (released November 14, 2011)

=== Singles ===
- "American Boy" (2012)
- "Change" (2012)
- "Tokyo Heartbreak" (2011)

== Bibliography ==
- "Alex York no Wanpointo Eikaiwa: Dai-1 kai Momotarō no Uta Pāto 1" ("Alex York's One Point English Conversation: Episode 1, Momotaro's Song, Part 1"). MTV Japan. (2019)
- "Alex York no Wanpointo Eikaiwa: Dai-2 kai Momotarō no Uta Pāto 2" ("Alex York's One Point English Conversation: Episode 2, Momotaro's Song, Part 2"). MTV Japan. (2019)
- "Alex York no Wanpointo Eikaiwa: Dai-3 kai Momotarō no Uta Pāto 3" ("Alex York's One Point English Conversation: Episode 3, Momotaro's Song, Part 3"). MTV Japan. (2019)
- "Alex York no Wanpointo Eikaiwa: Dai-4 kai Momotarō no Uta Pāto 4" ("Alex York's One Point English Conversation: Episode 4, Momotaro's Song, Part 4"). MTV Japan. (2020)
- Momotarō wo Utau dake de Eigo ga Hanaseru (Sing Momotaro, Speak English). (2020)
- "Yēru Daigakusotsu Arekkusu to YouTuber Daijirō ga Oshieru Maru de Neitibu Hatsuon! Gaikokujin to Nakayoku Nareru Furēzu" ("Yale Grad Alex and YouTuber Daijirō Teach Native Pronunciation! Phrases to Make Friends with Foreigners"). President Family. (2023)
