= A Cursive Memory =

American rock band

- Also known as: Sincerely Me
- Origin: Rancho Palos Verdes, California, U.S.
- Genres: Alternative rock; indie rock; emo pop
- Years active: 2006–2012
- Label: Vagrant
- Past members: Colin Baylen; Mark Borst-Smith; Shaun Profeta; Dillan Wheeler; Brian Bolen

A Cursive Memory were an American rock band from Southern California who released an EP and two albums in the period 2006 to 2012.

== Biography ==
The band originally formed under the name Sincerely Me in 2003 after members Colin Baylen (guitar/vocals) and Shaun Profeta (drums) met at a birthday party. Mark Borst-Smith (bass/keyboards) and Brian Bolen (guitar) completed the quartet. They started off playing covers of some of their favorite bands, such as Blink-182 and Jimmy Eat World, but eventually grew to write their own original songs and adopted the name A Cursive Memory.

Over the course of the next few years, the band built up a small local fan base and self-released their first EP, A Cursive Memory, which was recorded in Bolen's home studio. It featured the original version of The Piano Song. In 2005 the band self-released the Lights, Camera, Action EP that included Profeta contributing a significant amount of vocals and a new version of The Piano Song. Although they did not tour outside of their local scene, as all of the members were still in high school, they were signed by Bunim/Murray Productions. The song "Club Revolution Remix" was featured on an episode of The Real World.

The band spent 2006 and 2007 writing new material for their debut album, Changes. They were also featured in an episode of The Simple Life where a clip of their song "Perfect Company" was played. Gradually Profeta move to lead guitar and Bolen to drums. In the spring of 2007, the band was featured on the season finale of The Simple Life where they played the song "Perfect Company". They also joined Hellogoodbye as support on some of their west coast tour dates. Soon after, Bolen left A Cursive Memory to start his own band, Enter the Paradox. Upon graduation, the remaining trio signed with Santa Monica-based Vagrant Records. In October 2007, they put out the Respeck! EP, which featured four new songs and a remix of Perfect Company. Eventually, the band recruited Dillan Wheeler on drums, while Profeta moved to rhythm guitar.

The band's debut album, Changes, was released on Vagrant on February 19, 2008, and features reworked versions of previously released material. To promote the single 'Everything', the band shot a video while following paparazzi around Los Angeles and it featured appearances of a large number of celebrities. The video created an Internet buzz and appeared on Fox News, TMZ.com, E! Online, The N and in the top 10 of MTV's Total Request Live countdown. A second video for the single 'Perfect Company' was filmed on the Alaskan frontier.

The band embarked on a co-headlining tour with The Medic Droid across the United States in support of their debut album, Changes, including an appearance at The Bamboozle Left festival. They also appeared on a leg of the Warped Tour in 2008 and 2009.

The band played the Bamboozle roadshow while spending much of the year recording their second album. In September 2010, they released their new album, Let Love In, preceded by the single "Wondering". The album was produced by Matt Mahaffey and self-released.

== Discography ==
=== EPs ===
- A Cursive Memory (2005, self-released)
- Light Camera Action (2006, self-released)
  1. The Piano Song (New Version)
  2. Club Revolution (Remix)
  3. Take It for the Family
  4. I Was Wrong (Acoustic)
  5. Your Smile Never Fades... (Acoustic)
  6. Mr. White
  7. Lights Camera Action
- Respeck! EP (2007, Vagrant)
  1. South
  2. Perfect Company
  3. Tonight Lites
  4. The Piano Song (Acoustic)
  5. Perfect Company (Booty Mix)
- Everything - Single (2008, Vagrant)
  1. Everything
  2. The Piano Song (Acoustic)

=== LPs ===
- Changes (2008, Vagrant)
  1. South
  2. Everything
  3. Changes
  4. Perfect Company
  5. Bank
  6. Lions
  7. The Piano Song
  8. Tonight Lites
  9. All the Weak
  10. A Different Kind of Love
  11. Believe
  12. Figure Out
- Let Love In (2010, Vagrant)
  1. The Year
  2. Summer Soul
  3. Wondering
  4. Ciao Bella
  5. Dream Away
  6. Fall Away
  7. Pretty Little Thing
  8. Garden
  9. Leaving
  10. Pretend
  11. Painting the Roses Red
  12. Let Love In
