= The Things We've Grown to Love =

Studio album by All the Day Holiday
- Released: August 4, 2009
- Recorded: 2007 at Salad Days Studio, Baltimore, Maryland
- Genre: Indie rock
- Length: 49:48
- Label: Linc Star Records
- Producer: Matt Malpass

All the Day Holiday chronology
| We'll Be Walking On Air (2007) | The Things We've Grown to Love (2009) |

Professional ratings
Review scores
| Source | Rating |
|---|---|
| AbsolutePunk | 85% |

The Things We've Grown to Love is indie rock band All the Day Holiday's debut album released on August 4, 2009 by Linc Star Records. AbsolutePunk ranked the album 20th in its list of the Top Albums of 2009.

== Track listing ==
1. "Autumn" – 3:19
2. "Real Time" – 4:21
3. "2000 Winters" – 3:46
4. "Greener" – 4:51
5. "La Voyage" – 3:41
6. "Atmosphere" – 4:58
7. "Cities" – 4:02
8. "The Things We've Grown To Love" – 3:30
9. "Flowers And Fireworks" – 4:08
10. "Cheers (You Still Love Me)" – 5:13
11. "Mountains" – 4:27
12. "Invisible" – 3:35
