= Monoculture (album) =

Studio album by Sainthood Reps
- Released: August 9, 2011
- Recorded: February–April 2011
- Genre: Indie rock, post-hardcore
- Length: 43:22
- Label: Tooth & Nail
- Producer: Mike Sapone

Singles from Monoculture
- 1. "Monoculture"; 2. "DINGUS"; 3. "Hunter"

Monoculture is the debut studio album by American indie rock band Sainthood Reps. It was produced by Mike Sapone and released on August 9, 2011, by Tooth & Nail Records.

== Background ==
In 2010, following the release of a split EP with O'Brother, Sainthood Reps received an e-mail from Tooth & Nail Records expressing interest in signing them, convincing them to put on hold plans for a double EP (four songs from which ended up on the album). After receiving more songs from the band, however, the label expressed concern about signing what was then a mostly instrumental band with few vocals. An agreement was made to include both instrumental and vocal songs on the album, but during the seven months ultimately taken to finalize the contract, the band rented out a practice space to rehearse and write songs in preparation for the eventual recording process. It was during this process, according to guitarist Derrick Sherman, that the group "found [its] sound", ultimately abandoning the instrumental songs so as to have "a more cohesive record".

== Reception ==
Professional ratings
Review scores
Source	Rating
AbsolutePunk	84%
Allmusic	3/5 stars
Alter The Press!	4/5 stars
Under the Gun Review	7/10 stars

The album received largely positive reviews. Jason Heller of The A.V. Club included it in his monthly "Loud" column.

== Track listing ==
1. "Monoculture" - 3:16
2. "Dingus" - 3:00
3. "Telemarketeer" - 4:10
4. "Animal Glue" - 3:18
5. "Hunter" - 4:00
6. "No/Survival" - 2:14
7. "Hotfoot" - 4:35
8. "Holiday Makers" - 4:52
9. "reactor, reactor, reactor, REACTOR!" - 4:36
10. "Widow" - 6:26
