= Moving the Mountain =

Moving the Mountain may refer to:

- Moving the Mountain (novel), a 1911 feminist utopian novel by Charlotte Perkins Gilman
- Moving the Mountain (1993 film), a 1993 Canadian documentary film on the effects of the head tax and Chinese Exclusion Act in Canada
- Moving the Mountain (1994 film), a 1994 feature documentary about the 1989 Tiananmen Square student protests directed by Michael Apted
- Moving the Mountain: My Life in China, a 1990 memoir by Li Lu that was in part the basis for the 1994 film
- "Moving the Mountain (Odysseus Surrenders)", a song by The Used from the 2017 album The Canyon

== See also ==
- Moving Mountains (disambiguation)
