= Wild International (band) =

- Years active: 2009–present
- Members: Ryan Camenzuli; Greg Coffey; Bryan Daly

Wild International is a tribal/experimental band from New York City, USA. Originally formed in 2009 in Long Island, the band is composed of Ryan Camenzuli, Bryan Daly, and Greg Coffey. The band bases its sound on drums, bass and guitar, but also creates tribal sounds by layering in percussion, vocal harmonies and other experimental noises. The band's first self-titled EP was released in 2009, while touring around Long Island. Since then, the band has based itself in New York City, playing shows all over the five boroughs. In 2010, the band took part in The Break Contest, and wound up playing at The Bamboozle festival of that year. In 2012, Wild International released its second album, titled Lake Tones. The self-released album has received positive critical acclaim from such music websites and magazines as The Owl Mag, Bestnewbands.com, and The Deli Magazine.
