= Takota =

Takota is an Orange County, California band formed in 2005.

The band consists of vocalist Grant Arnow, who is a classically trained singer, drummer Drew Langan, guitarists Brett Anderson and Sergio Ruelas and bassist Danny Roddy. In 2006, the band recorded their debut album The Ivory Tower with Atreyu drummer/singer Brandon Saller producing.

In 2006 they joined Atreyu's World Championship Tour replacing From First to Last who left under controversial circumstances. They opened for Every Time I Die and Chiodos who were already on the tour.

The band was direct support for Bullets And Octane on their tour of the United Kingdom in early 2007. The band signed with Island Records upon returning from that tour.

Guitarist Andy Lara left the band in spring 2007. Drummer Justin Ferreira left the band in March 2009. In March 2008 Sergio Ruelas joined the band lead guitarist. In April 2009 Takota added Drew Langan as their new drummer. Jason Suwito from Irvine, California in the band, Polaris at Noon, was used as backup vocals and played the keyboard for Takota's Bamboozle Left performance in Los Angeles.

The band started recording the follow-up to The Ivory Tower with producer Bob Marlette. The album, titled Just Before Morning.

PopMatters noted in its review of The Ivory Tower, "It’s all in the delivery of vocalist Grant Arnow, who sounds more Steve Perry than Geoff Rickly, displaying a tenor voice made for arenas, making you wonder if this band is going to break into a rendition of 'Open Arms' before the album is over."
