= Just Surrender =

American rock band

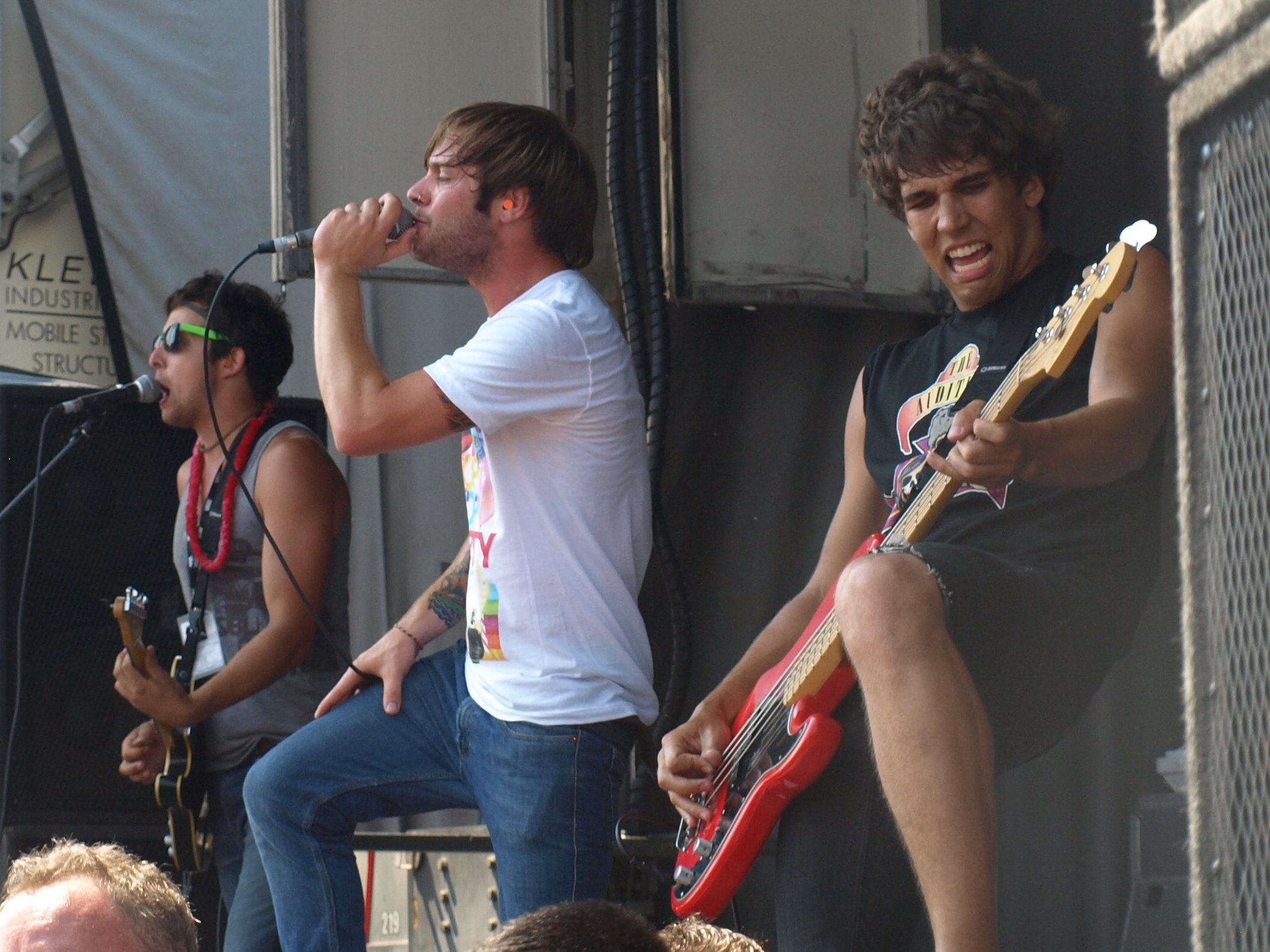
- Just Surrender performing in 2008

Background information
- Also known as: A Second Chance
- Origin: Dover Plains, New York, United States
- Genres: Pop punk; power pop; emo; post-hardcore
- Years active: 2003–2014, 2017–present
- Labels: Broken English; Razor & Tie; LAB
- Members: Jason Maffucci; Dan Simons; Jolly Ubriaco; Steve Miller; Ryan Kienle; Josh Grigsby
- Past members: Andy Meunier; Alex Haycraft; Kyle Shellhammer; Dan Gilmartin; Seth Lynch

Just Surrender is an American rock band from Dover Plains, New York, formerly known as A Second Chance, formed by three high school friends: Jason Maffucci, Andy Meunier and Steve Miller. The vocalist/guitarist Dan Simons, formerly of The Record Collection, joined the original three and it was a four-piece until 2008. The band is known for the up-beat mood in its music and for not having a lead vocalist, but rather having two vocalists who "share the spotlight". The group has released three studio albums and one EP.

== History ==
=== Origin and If These Streets Could Talk (2003–2005) ===
Just Surrender was formed in 2003 while the members were still attending high school. guitarist & vocalist Dan Simons says he was inspired by 70s and 80s bands such as Journey, Bon Jovi & Poison, Just Surrender's first compilation was a 4-song EP. Many of the songs written for the EP were re-recorded for their first full album, If These Streets Could Talk, which was released by the EastWest Records subsidiary Broken English in 2005. Recording took place at Nada Recording Studios in New York with the producer John Naclerio. The band and its first album appeared on MTV's You Heard It Here First. In reviewing the album, the music critic Kate Lohnes wrote, "Overall, Just Surrender has panache. There's talent backing this heartfelt, although slightly unoriginal, release." The critic, Christopher Felton described the album as "unfortunately nothing more than a half-decent attempt at copying the work of far more superior bands".

=== Touring and increased popularity (2005–2007) ===
The band quickly became popular on the music site PureVolume and received more than 400,000 plays in a matter of months.

In 2005, Meunier left the band, and was replaced by Alex Haycraft. On March 7, 2008, Meunier returned . The band sent in a statement to AbsolutePunk that reads, "Just Surrender fans may have noticed on recent tours that original guitarist Andy Meunier has returned to the band. Alex Haycraft (formerly of Park) has moved over to bass."

=== We're in Like Sin and Stronger Now EP (2007–2009) ===
Just Surrender released the song "Body Language and Bad Habits" on its MySpace page on July 1, 2007. The song is from the album We're in Like Sin, released on August 21, 2007. The album charted at number 27 on the Heatseekers Albums chart. In reviewing the album, AbsolutePunk wrote, "Though not necessarily bigger, and far from innovative, We’re In Like Sin is a worthy follow-up." Wonka Vision called it a "pop-punk" "guilty pleasure".

Just Surrender embarked on a Northeastern and Midwestern tour in January 2009 alongside Jesse Barrera of My American Heart, Patent Pending, Kelsey & the Chaos and Pull the Pin. After the addition and returning from the UK they wrote and recorded for an EP titled Stronger Now that was released on July 9, 2009. It was only made available at Warped Tour however, until released by iTunes on August 12. Stronger Now is significantly heavier than previous albums and has been described as post-hardcore.

In November 2009, the band joined Hawthorne Heights for the Never Sleep Again tour.

With another line-up change, Haycraft and Meunier left the band. Kyle Shellhammer (formerly of The High Court) became the band's bass guitarist, with Jolly Ubriaco as lead guitarist.

=== Phoenix and rumored indefinite hiatus (2010–2011) ===
On June 22, 2010, Just Surrender released a third full-length album called Phoenix. Two tracks, "Burning Up (Acoustic)" and "On My Own" have been released. It contains 12 tracks, including two previously released on the Stronger Now EP: the songs "Crazy" and "Stronger Now". That same day, a music video was released for "On My Own".

On June 10, 2010, the band released a statement on its Facebook page saying that Phoenix would be released June 22, 2010, through iTunes, and would be released through retail on July 13, 2010. "Take Me Home", the band's next single, was released on June 15 through iTunes as scheduled. Just Surrender then toured with Hit The Lights and The Maine on the Zumiez Couch Tour. Just Surrender has played many live shows since 2011.

=== Fourth studio album (2011–2014) ===
On December 19, it was reported that Just Surrender were writing material for a new album which would be self-released, and that Ryan Kienle, formerly of Matchbook Romance, was the band's new bass guitarist. Pitchfork revealed a release of the new album set for fall 2012. Simons said in a 2018 interview with American Slacker Podcast that the band had secretly gone into indefinite hiatus in 2013 but agreed that they would continue to write new material for the project while re-grouping.

=== Resurgence (2015–) ===
On January 20, 2015, Maffucci announced on Facebook that the band had officially been released from its contract with Razor and Tie Record Company and would be recording a new EP to be released in summer 2015. After its 2017 re-grouping, the band recruited ex-Houston Calls drummer Josh Grigsby to fill in for Miller during live shows and touring because of Miller's tight schedule.

== Style ==
Just Surrender's style has been described as "emo-rocking pop-punk." The band employs tradeoff vocals, drawing comparisons to Taking Back Sunday.

== Band members ==
Current

- Jason Maffucci – vocals (2003–2014, 2017–present), bass (2003–2007, 2012, 2017–present)
- Dan Simons – vocals, rhythm guitar (2003–2014, 2017–present)
- Steve Miller – drums, percussion (2003–2014, 2017–present)
- Hair - Lead Guitar (2025 - current)

Former

- Andy Meunier – lead guitar, backing vocals (2003–2005, 2007–2008)
- Alex Haycraft – lead guitar (2005–2007), bass (2007–2008), backing vocals (2005–2008)
- Dan Gilmartin – bass (2008)
- Kyle Shellhammer – bass (2008–2011)
- Jolly Ubriaco - Lead Guitar (yut)
- Josh Grigsby - Drums
- Ryan Kienle - Bass

== Discography ==
- In Your Silence EP (2003, self-released)
- A Second Chance EP (2004, self-released)
- If These Streets Could Talk (2005, Broken English Records)
- We're in Like Sin (August 21, 2007, Broken English Records)
- Stronger Now EP (July 9, 2008, self-released)
- Phoenix (July 13, 2010, Razor & Tie Records)
- Not dead yet EP (September 26, 2023, DDC Records)

== Videography ==
- "Tell Me Everything" – If These Streets Could Talk (2005)
- "I Can Barely Breathe" – If These Streets Could Talk (2005)
- "Your Life and Mine" – We're in Like Sin (2007)
- "On My Own" – Phoenix (2010)
