= A Love Like Pi =

A Love Like Pi is an American electronic rock band from Brooklyn, NYC, USA. They were founded in 2006 and are currently signed to Krian Music Group.

== History ==
Vocalist and founder Lief Liebmann and bassist Collin Boyle began a dubious kinship, starting out as members of opposing groups. After becoming friends and eventually bandmates, they began practicing together starting as early as eighth grade. Drummer Christopher LoPorto was discovered through the New Jersey music scene, and the trio came together in 2006 as Blind and Driving, before changing their name to A Love Like Pi.

After performing at the Bamboozle 2008 Festival and touring along the east coast and South by Southwest music conference, Thriving Records took them on and they began recording their first studio album, a self-titled demo EP. It was released on February 17, 2009. Their first full-length album, The Atlas and the Oyster, was released on March 24, 2009, and received overall positive reviews. BringOnMixedReviews.com says of the Atlas and the Oyster, "Pi (theoretically) goes on forever, and despite only a few quirky things I can nitpick about, so does my praise of this record."

A Love Like Pi toured the US with Years Gone By and Learning Takes a Lifetime, including participating in the Where the Wild Things Are Tour, and have announced plans to tour with Floral Terrace, Asteria, Gabriel the Marine, and Theatre Breaks Loose among others.

On November 11, 2014, the band released an unexpected follow up to their debut album, an EP titled Jack and The Giant through Krian Music Group. The band is currently based in New York City, NY, and their EP is available on iTunes. The album was reviewed on Absolutepunk.net citing enthusiasm and production as strong points.

Following the EP release, the band announced via their Facebook page that they were releasing a full-length album entitled "III" after the three stages of life, boy, man, and death. The album is available for pre-order on iTunes and is expected to be released September 18, 2015. It features 3 tracks from the Jack and the Giant EP, 1 previously unreleased track ("This is What You Get" now titled "Living Honestly"), and 6 brand new songs featuring a more atmospheric, relaxed, and organic feel than previous tracks.

== Members ==
- Lief Liebmann - vocals, synthesizer, violin
- Christopher LoPorto - drums

== Discography ==
- 2009: Atlas and the Oyster
- 2009: A Love Like Pi - EP
- 2014: Jack and the Giant
- 2015: III
