= Automatic Loveletter =

American rock band

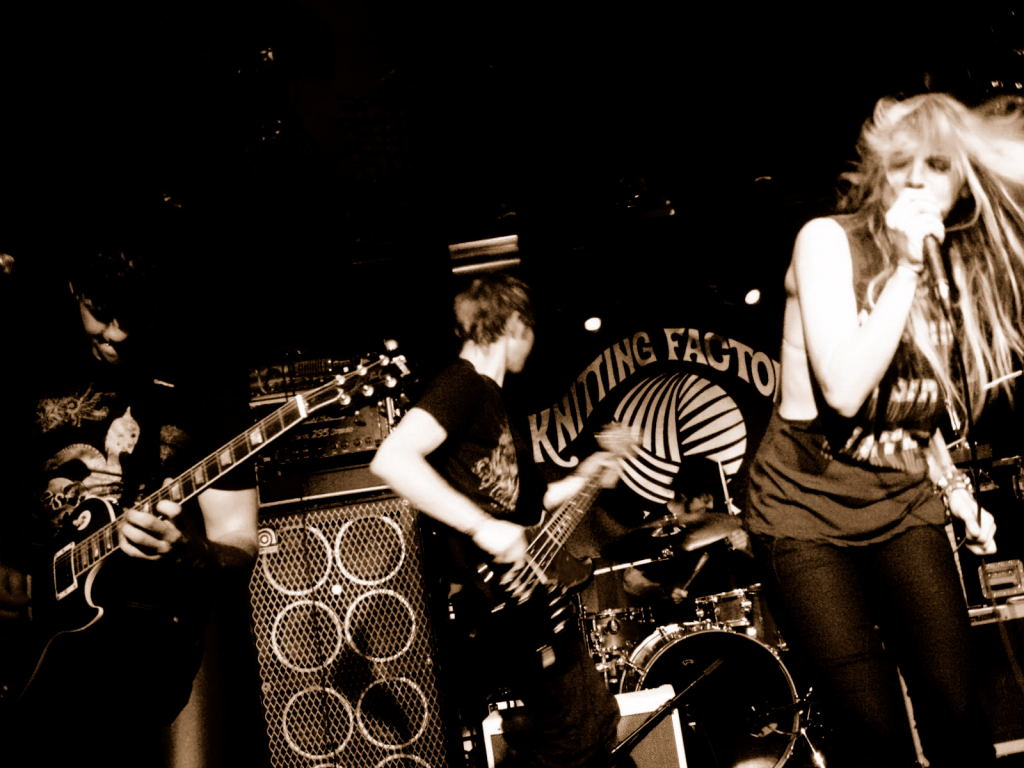
- Automatic Loveletter in 2008

Background information
- Origin: Tampa, Florida, U.S.
- Genres: Pop rock; acoustic rock; emo; pop punk; alternative rock
- Years active: 2005–2012
- Labels: Sony BMG; Paper + Plastick
- Past members: Juliet Simms; Tommy Simms; Daniel Currier; James Bowen; Joe Nelson; Tim Burkey; Ross Julian Gruet; Sean Noll; Ryan Metcalf; Clint Fowler
- Website: automaticloveletter.com

Automatic Loveletter was an American rock band formed in Tampa, Florida, in 2005. The band consisted of vocalist and guitarist Juliet Simms, her older brother and lead guitarist Tommy Simms, and drummer Daniel Currier.

== History ==
Automatic Loveletter was formed with Juliet Simms on guitar and lead vocals, Daniel Currier on drums and brother Tommy Simms playing bass and producing, with bassist Sean Noll sitting in on occasion in Tommy's home studio in the Tampa Bay area. The band was first called Stars and Scars and recorded its first song together in December 2005, naming the song after the band but written by lead singer Juliet Simms. They also recorded "Tin Lizzy", written by Tommy.

Juliet also finally acoustically laid down all of the songs she had been writing over the last three years for consideration for her first major label album. Signed by Allison Hagendorf, host of Fuse TV's "The Pop Show", then working at Epic Records, Juliet went on to form Automatic Loveletter while Epic struggled with the Sony BMG 2005 Payola Scandal and internal problems finally dropping over 70 bands in 2007. With Allison as Juliet's champion, Automatic Loveletter was not dropped but was also not supported for the next year and 1/2 touring in the drummer's Ford Excursion and burning their own copies of their Epic-produced CD with hand painted slip covers to help fund their tours.

Automatic Loveletter recorded their never-released debut EP in 2007 with producer Matt Squire (Panic! at the Disco, Boys Like Girls, All Time Low, Cute is What We Aim For, The Cab, and The Maine). "He challenged me and I challenged him," Simms said. "I felt very comfortable and that's when the best of me comes out. The entire time was playful and fun and that's what music is about to me -- having a good time." Simms took her massive songbook to Squire and narrowed down the right tunes and crafted them to fit together, sometimes taking songs in entirely new directions. "The Answer", for instance, was originally a ballad, but became one of the more upbeat numbers on the album. Daniel Currier and lead guitarist Joe Nelson both played on the album, Sean Noll officially joining just before some of their first tours together and big brother Tommy occasionally touring with the band to play lead, or rhythm guitar in larger venues and outdoor concerts filling up the sound and the stage. The band played both the main Bamboozle and Bamboozle Left in 2008.

The tracks "The Answer", "Parker", "August 28Th 3:30 A.M.", "Hush" and "Make-up Smeared Eyes (Acoustic)" were all released on their first official release Recover.

But after the tour when Epic was scheduled to release the album Automatic Loveletter were told to continue touring and asked by then President Charlie Walk to write more upbeat music. Instead, Juliet submitted a fan favorite "Black Ink Revenge" which was rejected several times for re-write until it became "My Goodbye" one of the tracks off the upcoming Sony release. "I had been signed to Epic for going on three years, toured in cars with my completely broke band and was feeling like I disappointed my fans who had been promised music for over a year so I sat in my room for four days re-writing and re-submitting that song like 5xs. I like "My Goodbye" a LOT but it was the result of a lot of pressure and the desire to get an album released." "My Goodbye", "The Day that Saved Us" and "Hush (New Version)" were quickly released as another self-titled EP just before the final chapter with Epic Records when they fired all the members except Currier before the first headlining tour. Epic held auditions for new members, hired Jacob Fatoroochi, James Bowen and Wayne Miller then halfway through the tour called Juliet and told her that all of the pay for the band she was on tour with was being withdrawn and the band was dropped. Despite this devastating setback the new hired guys pulled together and stayed on to complete the tour, and A.LL.went on to sell out venues like the Knitting Factory in LA and San Francisco. "It was very liberating. After crying my eyes out for a couple hours I had some of my best shows ever on that tour." Almost immediately the band was picked up by Sony and Juliet asked to write for a new album produced by Josh Abraham.

In 2011 they released an entirely acoustic album through Paper + Plastick Records.

In 2012 Juliet Simms pursued a solo career and was a contestant on NBC's The Voice.

== Personnel ==
=== Final lineup ===
- Juliet Simms – lead vocals, guitar, rhythm guitar, arrangements (2003–2012)
- Tommy Simms – lead guitar, backing vocals, acoustic arrangements (2006–2012)
- Clint Fowler – bass (2010–2012)

=== Former members ===
- Ross Julian Gruet – lead guitar (2007–2009)
- Tim Burkey – lead guitar, backing vocals (2007)
- Sean Noll – bass (2007–2008)
- Daniel Currier – drums, percussion (2006–2009)
- Ryan Metcalf – drums, percussion (2010–2011)

== Discography ==
=== Studio albums ===
- Truth or Dare (2010 Limited-Run U.S Release) (2011 Worldwide)
- The Kids Will Take Their Monsters On (2011)

=== Extended plays ===
- Recover (2007) (re-released by label Hot Topic in 2008 with two bonus tracks: “Can’t Move On” and “Unhearted”.)
- Automatic Loveletter EP (2009) - Previously unavailable due to licensing issues with then-record label Sony.

=== Unreleased ===
- The Ghost We Carry Home - Unreleased due to contractual problems with Epic, however it was eventually released in 2014 through PledgeMusic to help fund the recording of Juliet Simms' solo EP.

=== Music videos ===
Year	Video	Director
2006	"Hush (Original/2ndVersion)"	Luke Watson
2008	"Makeup Smeared Eyes"	Northern Five
2010	"Heart Song"	Chad Feehan
2011	"Story Of My Life"	Ehashin
