= Moving Mountains (band) =

American rock band

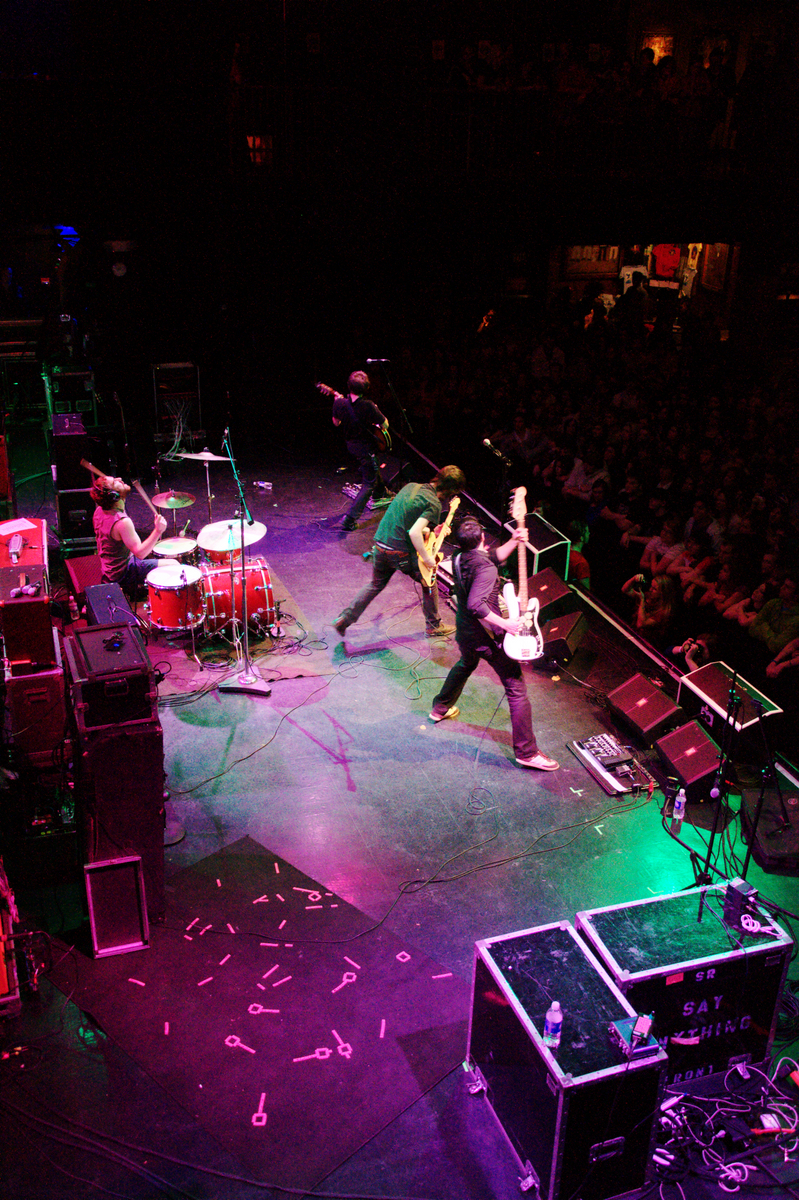
- Moving Mountains at House of Blues, Boston MA, 2009

Background information
- Origin: Westchester, New York, United States
- Genres: Indie rock; emo; post-rock; post-hardcore
- Years active: 2005–2013; 2015–2017; 2025-present
- Labels: Deep Elm; Caetera Recordings; Triple Crown; Count Your Lucky Stars; Wax Bodega
- Members: Gregory Dunn; Nicholas Pizzolato; Mitchell Lee; Josh Kirby
- Past members: Frank Graniero
- Website: https://movingmou.com/

Moving Mountains is an American rock band from Purchase, New York. Combining elements of emo and post-rock, the band has often been compared to such acts as The Appleseed Cast and Thrice.

== History ==
=== Formation and Pneuma (2005–2009) ===
Moving Mountains was formed in Westchester, New York in 2005 by Gregory Dunn (guitar/vocals) and Nicholas Pizzolato (drums). A self-titled demo was leaked to the public in early 2006 and their debut album Pneuma was released independently in early 2007. Later that year, Frank Graniero (guitar/vocals) and Mitchell Lee (bass) completed the band’s line-up. In 2008, Pneuma was reissued by Deep Elm Records. The album was written by Gregory Dunn. His lyrical inspiration was the death of his friend. The track titled "8105" represents the date August 1, 2005 when the band was officially formed by both Gregory Dunn and Nicholas Pizzolato.

An EP, Foreword was released on December 11, 2008.

=== Waves and self-titled album (2010–present) ===
Their second full-length album Waves was released May 11, 2011 on Triple Crown Records. The band has stated that Triple Crown Records let them record and write the album however they wanted to. The lyrics were written by Gregory Dunn, some of which, like Pneuma, were again written about his friend that had died. He has stated that this is the last album with lyrics about his deceased friend. With the album they wanted to create an album that would reflect how they play live.

An EP entitled New Light, which featured acoustic re-interpretations of two songs from Pneuma and two songs from Waves, was released on April 24, 2012.

Their self-titled third full-length album Moving Mountains was released on September 10, 2013 on Triple Crown Records.

In December, 2015, Moving Mountains announced a split EP with the band Prawn, as well as a three city tour the weekend of December 18 to 20. Cities included were Philadelphia, Brooklyn, and Cambridge. They toured with Prawn and Moneen.

=== Reunion and 4th LP ===
On June 6, 2025, the band announced their return with a post on their social media accounts, teasing the release of their new single Ghosts on June 10.

On June 27th, 2025, Moving Mountains released their fourth album, their first release in over a decade, 'Pruning of the Lower Limbs' via Wax Bodega and in both digital and limited vinyl colours on their bandcamp site.

== Music ==
An excerpt from their Myspace.com profile explains how they approach their musical endeavors: "For some bands, there is a core vision and purpose that shines through from beginning to the end. For others, there is an evolution of an idea, a constant metamorphosis whose end and scope is unknown. For Moving Mountains, the evolution not only encapsulates their music, but a larger overarching concept of what defines ‘Moving Mountains’. That isn’t to say that the Purchase, NY quartet have an artier than thou complex, but it does touch on an evolving aesthetic undercurrent and a belief that a band can create an experiential vision that goes beyond music."

Their influences include Hammock and The Album Leaf.

Moving Mountains tracks "Aphelion", "Fourth", and "8105" have been used on MTV's College Life, 16 and Pregnant, and Teen Mom. "Aphelion" has been used for a trailer for AMC’s television drama series Mad Men.

== Touring ==
Moving Mountains has toured extensively since releasing Pneuma, including runs with such bands as Coheed and Cambria, Thrice, Thursday, The Fall of Troy, Straylight Run, Brian Bonz, Say Anything, Moneen, Eisley, Pompeii, All The Day Holiday, The Dear Hunter, Prawn, and Polar Bear Club.

Moving Mountains performed at Bamboozle, on May 2, 2010.

On November 3, 2010, they were announced as support for Scottish band Biffy Clyro on a tour of North America. Moving Mountains were announced to play every date of the 2011 Vans Warped tour from June 24, 2011 in Dallas TX, through to August 14, 2011 in Hillsboro, OR. Moving Mountains was announced as support for Thrice on their tour for Major/Minor, along with La Dispute and O'Brother. Moving Mountains accompanied prog band Coheed and Cambria and screamo/post-hardcore band Pianos Become the Teeth on a short US tour in the spring of 2012.

== Band members ==
Current

- Gregory Dunn – lead vocals, rhythm guitar, trombone (2005–present)
- Nicholas Pizzolato – drums (2005–present)
- Mitchell Lee – bass (2007–present)
- Joshua Kirby – lead guitar, piano, backing vocals (2011–present)

Touring

- Frank Graniero - lead guitar, backing vocals (touring musician 2025-present; former band member 2007-2011)

== Discography ==
=== Albums ===
- Pneuma (2007, self-released; reissue 2008, Deep Elm Records; vinyl, Count Your Lucky Stars Records)
- Waves (2011, Triple Crown Records)
- Moving Mountains (2013, Triple Crown Records)
- Pruning of the Lower Limbs (2025, Wax Bodega)

=== EPs ===
- Moving Mountains (2006, self-released)
- Foreword (2008, self-released; reissue 2012, Topshelf Records)
- New Light (2012, Triple Crown Records)

=== Splits ===
- Moving Mountains & Prawn (2015, Triple Crown Records)

=== Music videos ===
- "Lights and Shapes" (2009)
- "The Cascade" (2011)
- "Alleviate" (2012)
- "Ghosts" (2025)
