= Pneuma (Moving Mountains album) =

Studio album by Moving Mountains
- Released: 2007 (reissued February 25, 2008)
- Genre: Post-rock, post-hardcore, experimental rock, math rock
- Length: 47:24
- Label: (Self-Released); Deep Elm Records

Moving Mountains chronology
Moving Mountains (2006)	Pneuma (2007)	Foreword (2008)

Professional ratings
Review scores
Source	Rating
Alternative Press	3/5 stars
Absolutepunk.net	86%
Punknews.org	4.5/5 stars

Pneuma is the debut full-length album released by the New York band Moving Mountains. It was originally self-released in 2007 but was eventually reissued with Deep Elm Records.

The album was the creative product of multi-instrumentalist Gregory Dunn and drummer Nicholas Pizzolato, and was produced, mixed, and mastered by Dunn during their late high school years. At the time of its release, Moving Mountains was only considered to be a studio project by Dunn and Pizzolato, with no future intentions of forming a full band or playing the songs in a live format. It was not until a few months later, when Pneuma started to gain positive acclaim throughout the internet, that the band decided to go in a full-band direction with the addition of bassist Mitchell Lee and guitarist/vocalist Frank Graniero.

== Track listing ==
All tracks are written by Moving Mountains.

No.	Title	Length
1.	"Aphelion"	2:29
2.	"Cover The Roots / Lower The Stems"	5:03
3.	"Alastika"	5:17
4.	"Fourth"	1:22
5.	"8105"	8:31
6.	"Bottom Feeder"	2:23
7.	"Sol Solis"	4:15
8.	"Grow On, Grow Up, Grow Out"	6:25
9.	"The Earth And The Sun"	3:54
10.	"Ode We Will Bury Ourselves"	7:54

Pneuma tracks “Aphelion,” “Fourth,” and “8105” have been used on MTV's College Life, 16 and Pregnant, and Teen Mom.

“Aphelion” has been used for a trailer for AMC's television drama series Mad Men.

== Personnel ==
- Gregory Dunn - vocals, guitar, bass, trombone, keyboards
- Nicholas Pizzolato - drums
- Michelle Cagianese - cello, vocals
- Peter Fusco - vibraphone, glockenspiel
