= Dead Men Dreaming =

American rock band

- Origin: Staten Island, New York, U.S.
- Genres: Hard rock, heavy metal
- Years active: 2004–present
- Members: Mike Triana; Dima Shnaydman; Rich Riccobono; Anthony Bordonaro; Paul Riccobono
- Past members: Chuck Bennetti; Vincent Carbonaro
- Website: deadmendreaming.com

Dead Men Dreaming is a rock band from Staten Island, New York. They have performed with bands such as Apocolyptica, CKY (band), Static-X, Bury Your Dead, Life of Agony, Type O Negative, ill Niño, Kittie, Dope, Otep, Walls of Jericho, Black Market Hero, Flaw, Marc Rizzo of Soulfly, Suicide City, Wheatus, Britny Fox, Enuff Z'nuff, Strength in Numbers and The PennyRoyals.

Dead Men Dreaming released their self-titled debut in 2006. Songs from their first album can be heard on regular rotation on CMJ radio stations such as 89.5 WSOU in New Jersey. In 2007 and 2008, they performed showcases at SXSW, as well as a cross-country tour in 2007 which includes headlining the Whisky a Go Go in Hollywood, California.

In October 2008, Dima Shnaydman joined Dead Men Dreaming, replacing the original drummer Chuck Bennetti who parted ways with the band but remains a close friend.

In 2009, they were part of the Bamboozle Tour presented by Wonka at the Meadowlands Complex in East Rutherford, NJ. They have also headlined at the Gramercy Theater as well as the Fillmore at Irving Plaza.

In 2010, they released their album Last Call with producer/engineer Jim Wirt (Incubus, Something Corporate, Jack's Mannequin, Live, and Hoobastank).

In 2019–2020, the band produced and released three singles, "All I Need", "Keep It Together", and "Goodbye". During that period of time, Vincent Carbonaro and the band parted ways amicably and still remain friends.

== Band members ==
- Mike Triana – vocals, piano/keyboards
- Rich Riccobono – bass
- Anthony Bordonaro – lead guitar
- Dima Shnaydman – drums
- Paul Riccobono – rhythm guitar

== Discography ==
- Dead Men Dreaming (studio album, 2006)
- Impure Thoughts (EP, 2008)
- Last Call (studio album, 2010)

Singles

- "Goodbye" (2020)
- "Keep It Together" (2020)
- "All I Need" (2020)

== Press reviews ==
In October 2008, CMJ featured Dead Men Dreaming in both their magazine publication and website: "The music of Dead Men Dreaming is provocative and unique; difficult to fix into a particular genre as it has extracted characteristics from the whole history of rock and roll. Their guitars and searing vocals wander the spectrum of emotions from angry and hopeful, to agitated and relieved, while retaining their virtuosity at every turn."
