= Jack Gwynne =

- Born: Joseph McClode Gwynne; April 12, 1895; Pittsburgh, Pennsylvania, US
- Died: December 7, 1969 (aged 74); Oak Lawn, Illinois, US
- Occupation: Entertainer / Magician
- Height: 5 ft 11 in (180 cm)
- Spouse: Anne Apel
- Children: 2

Jack Gwynne (April 12, 1895 – December 7, 1969) was an American illusionist, actor and creator of magic effects.

== Early life ==
Born Joseph McCloud Gwynne in Pittsburgh, Pennsylvania, Gwynne was inspired to become a magician after seeing a performance by Harry Kellar and Howard Thurston in 1908. With little money to procure magic props from professional outlets, Gwynne began designing and building his own tricks and illusions.

He married Anne Apel (1896–1979) in 1915 and had two children; Margaret (Peggy) Gwynne (1916–1973) and Virden “Buddy” Gwynne (1917–1978).

During the 1910s and early 1920s, Gwynne was employed by the Edgar Thompson Steel Mill (Carnegie Steel) in Pittsburgh during the day and performed and built magic at night. In 1925, after seeing a performance by Gwynne at Kaufman's Department Store in Pittsburgh, legendary magician Harry Houdini hired Jack to build several props for the Houdini show. These included an original “Disappearing Chicken” trick that was featured by Houdini until his death in October, 1926. Gwynne also built props for the Howard Thurston show and other contemporary performers. Later creations included the "Flip Over Dove Vanish" box and "Flying Carpet" levitation effect.

== Vaudeville ==
Following an appearance at the 1927 International Brotherhood of Magicians convention in Kenton, Ohio, Gwynne took his act to New York in attempt to find work in vaudeville. After a show for booking agents at the Franklin Theater, Gwynne was offered a contract with RKO (Radio-Keith-Orpheum), the largest chain of vaudeville theaters in the U.S., for 50 weeks, beginning in September, 1927. From that point, Gwynne's career took off with performances from coast to coast for the next eight years. In New York he was featured at the Palace Theater (considered the top vaudeville theater in the nation), along with The Roxy, Loew's State, and Radio City Music Hall. Gwynne's act was known for its speed, precision timing and baffling, original magic. Trademark routines included the appearance of a tall stack of seven glass goldfish bowls (filled with water and live goldfish), the Disappearing Chicken and his original Temple of Benares (sword box) illusion. Utilizing his wife, son, daughter and nephew, Roger Apel, in the act, the Gwynnes became known as “The Royal Family of Magic.”

== Floor Shows ==
As American vaudeville declined in the mid-1930s, Gwynne adapted his stage act to perform in the then-new venue of floor shows. Floorshows were small entertainment revues, featuring several live acts, that performed on the dance floors of night clubs and hotels during the flourishing post-Prohibition, big band era. Gwynne was the first illusionist to adapt to this new medium. It was unusual because many thought that magicians needed a stage and curtains to hide the workings of their tricks. Gwynne could perform his act with the audience entirely surrounding him, which heightened the mystery. As he had in vaudeville, Gwynne became one of the most popular performers in nightclubs during their heyday before World War II.

== Motion Pictures ==
While performing in nightclubs in California in 1940, Gwynne and his family settled in Hollywood. Gwynne was cast in several motion pictures by Universal Studios, including, Dark Streets of Cairo (1940); Bagdad Daddy (Knight In A Harem) (1941); Model Wife (1941); Three Hits and a Miss (1941); and Hello, Sucker (1941). A friend of director and magician, Orson Welles, Gwynne is also credited with a brief appearance (as the “man on the roof”) in Welles’ epic, Citizen Kane (RKO, 1941). In several of his film appearances, Gwynne performed some of his original magic routines.

== USO ==
With America's entry into World War II, Gwynne joined the United Service Organization (USO). In 1943, as part of USO unit #289, Gwynne made a tour of stateside army bases and hospitals, entertaining the troops. In 1944, Jack and Anne Gwynne embarked on a year-long tour for the USO, through remote parts of North Africa, Italy, Iran, India, Burma and China, presenting hundreds of shows for soldiers on the front lines of combat. Upon their return to the United States in July 1945, the Gwynnes had logged some 30,000 miles of travel for the USO. Their son, Buddy was a decorated glider pilot during the war in Europe and also performed a private magic show for U.S. Army general, Mark Wayne Clark and his staff.

== Postwar years and television ==
Following the war, the Gwynne family settled in the Chicago suburb of Oak Lawn, Illinois. With the help of his son, Buddy and son-in–law, Frank Cole II (also a magician), Gwynne built a large magic show that toured theaters and civic auditoriums throughout the United States from 1946 to 1960.

As television burst upon the scene, Gwynne was the first illusionist to be featured in a series, with 28 appearances (between 1952 and 1955) on the ABC network show, Super Circus. Gwynne was also featured in print and broadcast advertising for Zenith television.

== Final years ==
Gwynne continued to find work with his magic during an era when many other magicians were struggling to make ends meet. In the early 1960s he was featured in several Shrine Circus productions around the United States. Making his entrance atop an elephant, he performed his magic in the center ring, surrounded by the audience. He appeared in the inspirational film, Parable, that was featured at the Protestant Pavilion at the 1964 New York World's Fair. That same year, Gwynne headlined the annual production of It’s Magic at the Wilshire Ebell Theater in Los Angeles.

By the late 1960s, Gwynne had been performing for over 50 years. Realizing there was a new generation who had not been exposed to live entertainment, he developed an educational magic program that was featured in Chicago schools. Despite the fact that Gwynne was now into his seventies and suffering from cancer, his phenomenal dexterity remained with him until the end of his life. In addition, he continually embraced children and adolescents fascinated by magic. Frequently he could be seen backstage talking magic with young boys and girls expressing personal interests to become magicians.

== Death ==
Jack Gwynne died of a heart attack at age 74 on Sunday, December 7, 1969 at his home in Oak Lawn, Illinois. The previous Friday he had performed four magic shows at Chicago area schools. His wife, Anne, survived him by 10 years, making annual appearances at the Abbott's Magic Get-Together in Colon, Michigan, where she presented the “Jack Gwynne Excellence In Magic Award” each year to the outstanding magician at the gathering. The award is still presented by surviving members of the Gwynne family.

== Sources ==
- Charvet, David. Jack Gwynne: The Man, His Mind and his Royal Family of Magic. 1986. Charvet Studios, Brush Prairie, Washington.
- Genii–The International Conjuror’s Magazine. April, 1968 issue.
