= Moving Mountains (Moving Mountains album) =

Studio album by Moving Mountains
- Released: September 10, 2013
- Genre: Indie rock, post-rock
- Length: 37:58
- Label: Triple Crown Records

Moving Mountains chronology
New Light EP (2012)	Moving Mountains (2013)

Professional ratings
Review scores
Source	Rating
Absolutepunk.net	90%
Metacritic	68/100

Moving Mountains is the third album by the band Moving Mountains. It was released on September 10, 2013.

== Track listing ==
All tracks are written by Moving Mountains.

Original tracks
No.	Title	Length
1.	"Swing Set"	5:14
2.	"Burn Pile"	3:19
3.	"Hands"	3:49
4.	"Seasonal"	3:58
5.	"Eastern Leaves"	4:51
6.	"Hudson"	5:32
7.	"Under A Falling Sky"	2:20
8.	"Chords"	3:39
9.	"Apsides"	6:15

iTunes bonus tracks
No.	Title	Length
1.	"Stones"	4:11
2.	"Under A Falling Sky (Ansible remix)"	4:12

== Band members ==
- Gregory Dunn - lead vocals, guitar
- Nicholas Pizzolato - drums
- Mitchell Lee - bass
- Joshua Kirby - guitar, backing vocals
