= Drive By (band) =

US musical group

Drive By was a New Jersey–based music group that toured nationally and internationally since 2004 after the release of their debut album I Hate Every Day Without You Kid... After three years of touring in support of the album, they released a new record, title A Delicate Situation, on April 8, 2008. Delicate Situation reached No. 26 on the Billboard Heatseekers chart. Lead singer and guitar player Todd Price has covered for Frank Iero of My Chemical Romance on several tours. The band is signed to Riot Squad Records and Riot Squad Management, a management company that also works with My Chemical Romance, Circa Survive, Endless Hallway and Fever Club.

Drive By has been covered in press formats such as Spin magazine, and opened for My Chemical Romance and Billy Talent on My Chemical Romance's 2008 North American Tour. The group split in the middle of 2010.

== Members ==
- Todd Price – vocals, guitar
- Daniel Fitzgerald – guitar
- Jaeson Hertzberg – drums
- Chris Perino – bass

== Past members ==
- Manny Felix – guitar

== Discography ==
"I Hate Every Day Without You Kid..." (released in May 2006)

No.	Title	Length
1.	"...you're Not Alone"	2:42
2.	"Maybe Someday"	2:55
3.	"Black Triangles"	3:14
4.	"Promise"	3:25
5.	"Accidents"	2:53
6.	"Rotting on the Vine"	1:49
7.	"The Hand That Cuts"	4:07
8.	"Spending Time Alone"	3:25
9.	"Wide Awake"	2:10
10.	"Why are you Following Me?"	2:33
11.	"Goodbyes"	3:49

"A Delicate Situation" (released April 8, 2008)

No.	Title	Length
1.	"Thank You"
2.	"The Day That You Decide"
3.	"Catacombs"
4.	"Please, Please"
5.	"Where Did I Go? (Part of the Team)"
6.	"Boring"
7.	"One Thing"
8.	"Dear Mom & Dad,"
9.	"It's The Same"
10.	"America (chasing ghosts)"
11.	"I Am A Refugee"
