= Pistolita =

Indie rock band from San Diego, California

- Origin: San Diego, California
- Genres: Indie rock Piano rock Progressive; Emo
- Years active: 2004–2007
- Label: Montalban Hotel
- Members: Conor Meads – piano/vocals Justin Shannon – guitar/vocals Cory Stier – drums
- Past members: Alex Kuhse – bass Derek Miller – bass

Pistolita was an indie rock band from San Diego, California. They previously toured as an opening act for bands such as Brand New and Saves the Day, and were featured on the Volcom Stage at Warped Tour 2006.

Pistolita was a nominee for Best Alternative Album at San Diego Music Awards. The ceremony was held on September 18, 2006.

== History ==
Conor Meads and Cory Stier were childhood friends and next door neighbors. Justin Shannon (guitar) and Alex Kuhse (bass) knew Meads and Stier from high school, and in the wake of their graduation, the four friends decided to put their musical talents together and start Pistolita. The band was primarily influenced by Fugazi, At the Drive-In, Hot Water Music and Hot Snakes.

Conor Meads followed up Oliver Under the Moon with The Paper Boy EP in 2009.

Pistolita was the first signing on Montalban Hotel Records, a label run by booking agent Andrew Ellis, as a subsidiary of East West Records and Warner Music Group.

Their song "Beni Accident" was featured on the EA Sports video game NHL 07.

== Discography ==
- Gliss Note (EP, 2005)
- Oliver Under the Moon (LP, 2006, Montalban Hotel)
- The Paper Boy (EP, 2009)

=== Collaborations ===
- Pick Your Battles, Volume 1 along with Denver Harbor, Underoath, Noise Ratchet, The Juliana Theory and Anberlin.
