= Sainthood Reps =

American indie rock band

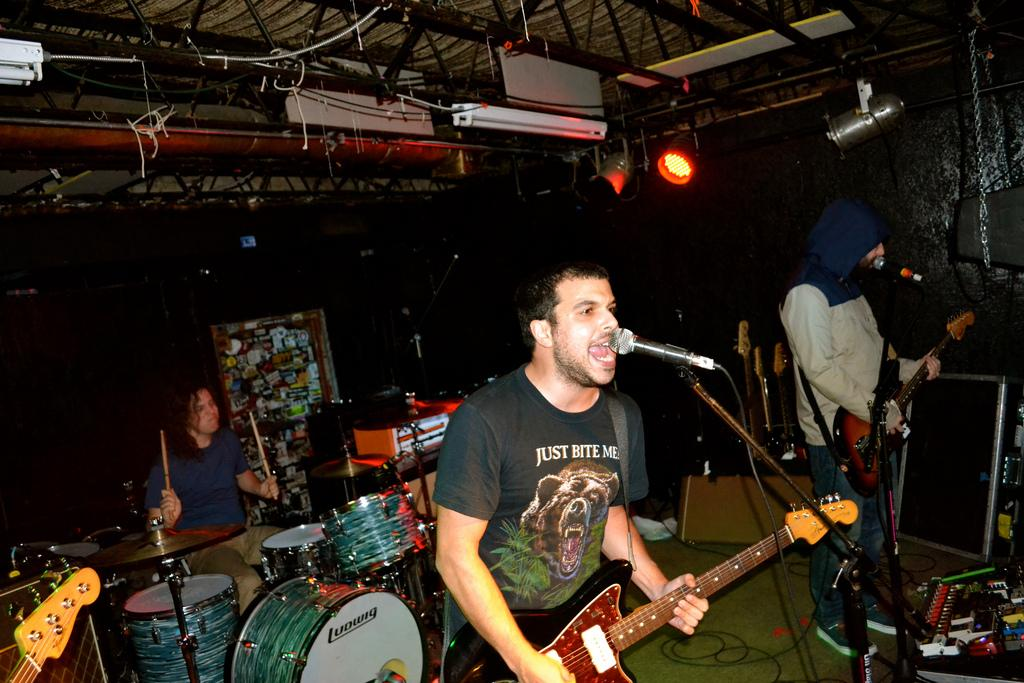
- Sainthood Reps performing in 2012.

Background information
- Origin: Long Island, New York, USA
- Genres: Indie rock, alternative rock, post-hardcore, punk rock, noise rock, post-grunge, emo, hard rock
- Years active: 2009 – present
- Labels: No Sleep, Tooth & Nail
- Spinoff of: Brand New
- Members: Francesco Montesanto; Derrick Sherman; Bradley Cordaro; Jani Zubkovs
- Website: sainthoodreps.com

Sainthood Reps is an American indie rock band from Long Island, New York, formed in 2009. Their debut album, Monoculture, was released on Tooth & Nail Records in the summer of 2011 and was produced by Mike Sapone. The band released their second album, Headswell, in October 2013 through No Sleep Records.

== History ==
=== Origins (2009-2010) ===
The band was co-founded by lead vocalist/guitarist Francesco Montesanto and Brand New touring guitarist Derrick Sherman, who had grown up together in Long Island, developing similar musical tastes and periodically playing music together when not touring with other bands they were in. The beginnings of Sainthood Reps came when Montesanto sent Sherman a collection of demos he had written, ultimately leading to a musical collaboration. They first released music under the Sainthood Reps name via a Myspace page in August 2009. Drummer Bradley Cordaro and bassist Jani Zubkovs joined, and the band officially formed in September 2009. They first started touring in December of the same year with All the Day Holiday, followed by a January 2010 tour with Caspian. Also, in January, the band released a split EP with O'Brother.

=== Signing and Monoculture (2010–2011) ===
Originally intending to record a double EP in March 2010, the band was distracted from that venture by a number of offers from record labels. One of these was from Tooth & Nail Records, who had heard their split EP and ultimately signed them in February 2011. Prior to their signing, Sainthood Reps spent May 2010 touring with The Felix Culpa and played a September show with fellow Long Island bands The Sleeping and Glassjaw. Monoculture was released by Tooth & Nail on August 9, 2011, to largely positive reviews. In the latter half of 2011, the band opened for The Felix Culpa at the latter's farewell show.

=== Headswell (2011–present) ===
Sherman confirmed to Indie Vision Music in an October 2011 video interview that he and Montesanto had written "five songs that we know are on record two", as well as an EP that they were "debating about putting out" which would showcase the band's original post-rock instrumental style. In the spring of 2012, Sainthood Reps joined La Dispute's Wildlife Tour and released a music video for "Monoculture", the title track from their debut album. The band released their second full length, Headswell, on October 22, 2013 via No Sleep Records.

After several years of inactivity, the band returned to the stage in 2018, opening for Pianos Become the Teeth and joining Long Island's Wild Fest alongside Latterman, Latex Generation, and Mikey Erg. In March 2019, the band released a new single, "Burning Sheep", via BrooklynVegan, marking their first new music in six years. In November, Sainthood Reps and Incendiary supported Bayside at a tour date in Long Island.

In March 2020, Derrick Sherman announced a new solo project entitled Grist Mill, with a debut EP that saw him reteaming with producer Mike Sapone. October 2021 saw the band perform at Amityville Music Hall to commemorate "ten years of the critically panned record Monoculture".

=== Dull Bliss (2025–present) ===
Their third album, Dull Bliss, will be released on September 26, 2025 through Smartpunk Records.

== Musical style and influences ==
Andrew Leahey of AllMusic describes the band's music as "a moody mix of post-grunge, hard rock, and post-hardcore", while Brian, a staff writer at Punknews.org, said of the band's split EP, "Like O'Brother, the band mixes indie rock brood and post-rock atmosphere, but with a little more obvious melody and verse-chorus structure." Montesanto himself has described Sainthood Reps' music as simply "loud" and "early '90s alternative". Influences cited by the band include Fugazi, Nirvana, Mogwai, The Cohen Brothers, The Jesus Lizard, Built to Spill, Dinosaur Jr., Sunny Day Real Estate, Explosions in the Sky, Sonic Youth, My Bloody Valentine, and Yuck.

== Members ==
=== Current ===
- Francesco Montesanto — lead vocals, guitar
- Derrick Sherman — guitar, backing vocals
- Jani Zubkovs— bass guitar
- Bradley Cordaro — drums

=== Former ===
Ryan Sadis — bass guitar

== Discography ==
EPs

- O'Brother/Sainthood Reps Split EP (2010)
- Sainthood Reps/Weatherbox Split EP (2013)

Albums

- Monoculture (2011)
- Headswell (2013)
- Dull Bliss (2025)

Singles

- "Monoculture"
- "DINGUS"
- "Hunter"

Music Videos

- "Monoculture" (2012)
