= The Medic Droid =

American synthpop band

Background information
- Origin: Phoenix, Arizona, United States
- Genres: Synthpop, dance
- Years active: 2003–2008, 2012–2013, 2015–2016, 2023–present
- Labels: Modern Art Records; Epic Records
- Past members: Chris Donathon; Hector Bagnod; Johnny Chavez; Greg Rudawski

The Medic Droid is an American synthpop band from Phoenix, Arizona, who combined emo and techno to create dance music for club-goers. The trio of Chris Donathon, Hector Bagnod and Johnny Chavez first gained a massive following on MySpace during 2006–2007, then signed to the independent label Modern Art in 2008 to release their first album, What's Your Medium. The band toured sporadically until they ceased activity in 2016.

They returned to music in 2025, Chris Donathon is the only original member, along with Richie Abelia on guitar

== History ==
=== Beginnings and Whats Your Medium (2003–2008) ===
The Medic Droid was started in 2005 with Chris Donathon, Hector Bagnod and Johnny Chavez (Droid). Bagnod and Donathon first met in 2003, but Donathon moved away from the city after they met, only to return (and begin the band) a few years later. The group gained a strong initial following through the social networking site Myspace; by mid-2008 the song "Fer Sure" had logged almost 2 million plays on the site and the group had accumulated over 100,000 friends there. Soon they were noticed by manager Avery Andon who brought the band to New York where they played their first live show opening for Enter Shikari at The Bowery Ballroom and caught the eye of A&R's from Epic Records who would later go on to sign the band. The group eventually made two new songs "Keeping Up with the Joneses" and "FSCENE8", enlisting the help of Australian DJ S3RL to remix these songs. In late 2007, Johnny Droid left the band.

They later hired Greg Rudawski as drummer for live shows and were signed to Modern Art Records, a local Phoenix indie label distributed by Epic Records. They wrote and recorded their debut album Whats Your Medium and it was released on June 10, 2008. Whats Your Medium reached no. 33 on the Billboard Heatseekers chart.

The band was inspired by 1980s popular culture, their name referencing a character from the Star Wars sequel The Empire Strikes Back, and recording a version of the Madonna anthem "Into the Groove".

=== Touring and break-up (2008) ===
The Medic Droid went on a tour with A Cursive Memory in Spring 2008 across the U.S. They co-headlined for every date. Breathe Carolina, the White Tie Affair, and the Morning Of joined the tour for select dates, but did not go for the whole tour. Kill Hannah's Hope for the Hopeless U.S. Tour 2008 was presented by Hot Topic. Kill Hannah was the headliner and had the tour for their recently released compilation of B-sides and rarities. The Medic Droid, Innerpartysystem, and the White Tie Affair joined them as special guests for the whole tour. The tour began in July and ended in August 2008.

The Blackout's headlining tour, "Sleep All Day, Party All Night", toured in Japan, Europe, and the UK. The Medic Droid was on the road for the UK dates in October. From First to Last and We Are the Ocean also toured with them.

The Medic Droid headlined their final tour with supporting acts Hyper Crush and Chronic Future in November and December 2008. The group's members showed strain from constant touring, and on December 16, 2008, both Bagnod and Donathon posted notice on their MySpace pages that the band had dissolved.

=== Reunion (2012–13) ===
On February 8, 2012, Chris Donathon created a Facebook page for the band, inviting the band's fans to spread the word about a reunion. On February 19, 2012, AbsolutePunk posted a blog stating that the band had reunited.

On July 25, 2012 Donathon announced he would be selling limited edition T-shirts to help fund a new EP. On November 10, 2012 the band announced that they would be returning to the stage at the "South by So What?!" festival on March 16, 2013.

=== Second reunion (2015–2016) ===
On December 22, 2015, the Medic Droid added a new picture to their Facebook along with, "THE MEDIC DROID 2016." The following day they announced their first show back opening for Austin Jones on the Phoenix, Arizona date of his "We'll Fall Together Tour" on January 21, 2016 at Joe's Grotto. On March 2, 2016, The Medic Droid announced an Australian tour which began in Perth on May 15 and wrapped up on June 4, 2016 in Melbourne. Additional dates were announced on March 31, 2016. On May 19, 2016, the Medic Droid released their first song in 8 years titled "Closer". A second song, "Disco Queen", was released on June 1, 2016.

== Discography ==
=== Studio albums ===
- Whats Your Medium (2008)

=== Extended plays ===
- Irrelevant (2008)

=== Music videos ===
List of music videos, showing year released and director
Title	Year	Director(s)
"The Killer Anna"	2008	Ben Sheppee

== Band members ==
Current members
- Chris Donathon – lead vocals (2005–2008, 2012–2013, 2015–2016)
- Hector Bagnod (aka Hekti, Hekti 3000) – programming, synths, guitars (2005–2008, 2012–2013, 2015–2016)

Former members

- Johnny Chavez (aka Johnny Droid) – programming, synths, vocals, guitars (2005–2007)

Former Touring members

- Greg Rudawski - drums (2008)
