= Asteria (band) =

American pop/rock band

- Origin: Crown Point, Indiana
- Genres: Pop rock, Electronic
- Years active: 2003–present
- Labels: Carbon Copy Media (2005–2006), Broken English Records (2006–2008), Independent(2008–present)
- Members: Terrence Kline; Seth Henderson; Ryan Gullett; Brandon McQuen; Sam Henderson
- Website: Official website

Asteria is an American pop/rock band from Crown Point, Indiana.

== History ==
Asteria formed in 2003 at Crown Point High School and began playing local shows, building a strong regional following. Their name was chosen by drummer Sam Henderson from a gardening book; it is an alteration of the word wisteria. After releasing their first album, 2004's Broken-Hearted Lullabies And Hope-Filled Dreams, they played at the Indiana Region Rumble in 2004 and won a number of regional awards that year. Their second full-length A Lesson in Charades followed in May 2005, which soon after led to their signing to Carbon Copy Media, owned by J.T. Woodruff of Hawthorne Heights. However, the group eventually split with Carbon Copy and recorded their follow-up with producer John Naclerio. Naclerio decided to release the album on his own Broken English Records (a subsidiary of EastWest Records); the album was originally slated for a November 2006 release, but was pushed back to February 2007. The group toured nationally in support of the album.

In February 2008, the group announced it is no longer with Broken English. They toured the U.S. with Bedlight for Blue Eyes and The High Court in the spring of 2008. During the summer of 2008, they toured with This Century.

Over the next 2 years, Asteria had been recording in their home-studio to prepare for a new album and tour. It was announced in the summer of 2009 that they indeed were releasing a new album the following year. As 2010 drew near, Asteria along with two of the members older brother Joel Henderson (Comeuppence Network), released a string of promotional videos about their upcoming album as well as the title: 'Momentum.' The band revealed their new album with a new sleak, mature, and progressive appearance and vibe. This includes the band itself as well. 'Momentum' was a fan-favorite as well as a universal key to any doors Asteria may not had been able to open in the years prior.

After about a year of shows and promotion for their latest album 'Momentum,' The band slowly shifted in to a quiet hiatus. Some members of the band have continued to perform music under different project titles. Although 3 of the 5 band members relocated away from the bands 'home-base' studio "ABG Studios (Always Be Genius)," [Owned and Operated by Seth Henderson in Crown Point, IN] - The band is still in contact and have even teased more shows/a new album. This hasn't been confirmed 'officially.'

Asteria has announced their first show since the hiatus. The band announced on Seth's studio (alwaysbegenius) instagram page that they will be performing again live with fellow bands 'The Fastest Kid Alive,' 'Breathe Electric,' and 'Joe Renardo / The Forecast' at Centennial Lanes in Tinley Park, IL on Saturday Nov. 25th at 6pm/CT. There has been no confirmation on if this is the first of a string of shows for a comeback tour or just a one-time-event as of October 2017.

== Members ==
- Terrence Kline - Vocals
- Seth Henderson - Guitar & Backing Vocals
- Ryan Gullett - Guitar & Backing Vocals
- Sam Henderson - Drums
- Brandon McQuen - Bass

== Discography ==
=== Albums ===
- Broken-Hearted Lullabies And Hope-Filled Dreams (2004)
- A Lesson in Charades (2005)
- Slip Into Something More Comfortable (Broken English/EastWest, 2007)

=== EPs ===
- Asteria EP (19 August 2008)
- Momentum (September 2010)
