= O'Brother =

American rock band

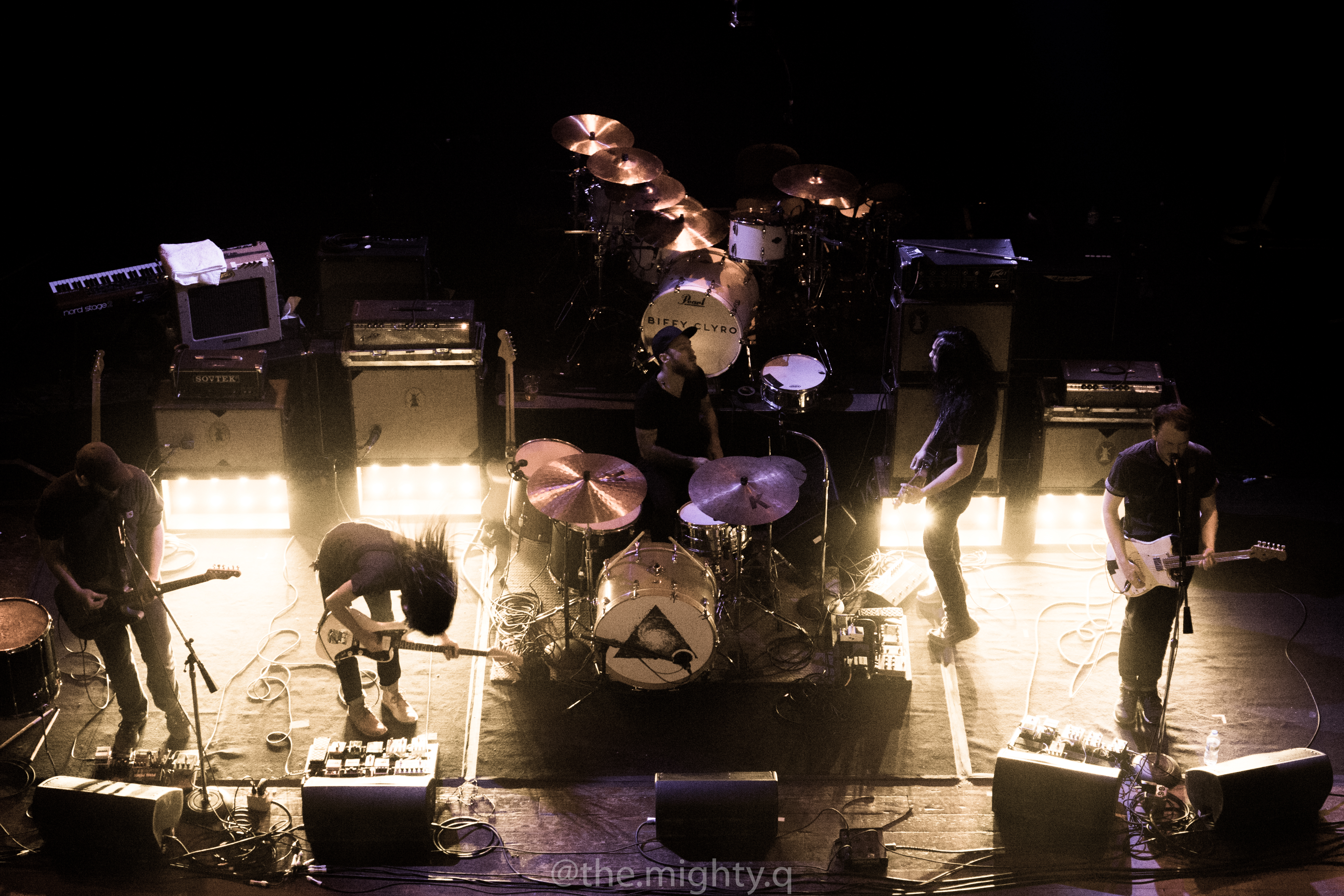
- Left to right: Jordan McGhin, Johnny Dang, Michael Martens, Anton Dang, and Tanner Merritt in 2017

Background information
- Origin: Atlanta, Georgia, U.S.
- Genres: Alternative rock; indie rock; post-rock; sludge metal; experimental rock
- Years active: 2006–present
- Labels: Favorite Gentlemen, Triple Crown
- Members: Tanner Merritt; Anton Dang; Johnny Dang; Michael Martens; Jordan McGhin
- Past members: Aaron Wamack; Spencer Ussery; Kyle Coleman
- Website: obrothermusic.net

O'Brother is an American rock band from Atlanta, Georgia.

== History ==
After releasing their debut EP, In Comparison to Me, in 2006, Aaron Wamack and Tanner Merritt joined the band in 2008. A second EP, The Death of Day was released on May 5, 2009, by Favorite Gentlemen Recordings, to positive reviews. The band also released a vinyl split of their song, Lay Down, in collaboration with Sainthood Reps (a side-project of Brand New's Derrick Sherman), under the vinyl label, The Ambitious Guest. After the release of The Death of Day, the band toured with Manchester Orchestra and The Features in February – March 2010. O'Brother joined Thrice's Major/Minor tour in September – November 2011, alongside Moving Mountains and La Dispute. Their first LP, Garden Window, was released on November 15, 2011, and was well-received critically. The record was released by Triple Crown and was co-produced by Andy Hull and Robert McDowell from Manchester Orchestra. The band recorded a session at Daytrotter in Nov 2011. In February 2012, O'Brother went on a co-headlining tour with Junius. Aaron Wamack left the band prior to the tour's start.

== Band members ==
Current members

- Tanner Merritt – lead vocals, guitar
- Johnny Dang – guitar
- Jordan McGhin – guitar
- Michael Martens – drums
- Anton Dang – bass

== Discography ==
=== EPs ===
- In Comparison to Me (2006)
- The Death of Day (2009)
- Basement Window (2012)

=== Studio albums ===
- Garden Window (2011)
- Disillusion (2013)
- Endless Light (2016)
- You and I (2020)
