= All the Day Holiday =

American indie rock band

- Origin: Cincinnati, Ohio, USA
- Genres: Indie rock, alternative rock, ambient rock
- Years active: 2007-2010 (indefinite hiatus)
- Label: Warner Bros Records / Linc Star Records
- Members: Daniel Simmons; Mark Ventura; David Roller; Nathan Frisch
- Website: myspace.com/allthedayholiday

All the Day Holiday is an American indie rock band based in Cincinnati, Ohio, formed in 2007.

Rolling Stone named All the Day Holiday one of six breakout bands to watch for at the 2009 Bamboozle Festival.

== History ==
=== Formation ===
All the Day Holiday formed from the dust of an experimental screamo/ambient act from Cincinnati. Two original members from Against the Nations, Mark Ventura and Daniel Simmons, slowly turned the band into All the Day Holiday with a name change, and a replacement of two members over time (Nathan Frisch and David Roller).

To date the band has released one EP and one full-length studio album.

They are currently under artist development by Warner Bros. Records/Linc Star Records, and are on roster at High Road Touring (Wilco, Broken Social Scene, Bloc Party, Feist, The Fiery Furnaces, Girls).

In 2010, the band went on hiatus. David Roller has since put his creative efforts into developing and recording his own album over the course of 2011, as well as participating in the band Math Blaster. Mark Ventura has recorded under the name Old Lasso.

=== We'll Be Walking On Air ===
The band self-released the EP We'll Be Walking On Air on May 5, 2007.

=== The Things We've Grown To Love ===
The Things We've Grown To Love is All the Day Holiday's debut album, released on August 4, 2009 and produced by Matt Malpass. The album was included on AbsolutePunk's list of top thirty albums of 2009.

== Discography ==
=== Albums ===
Year	Title	Label
2009	The Things We've Grown To Love	Linc Star Records

=== EPs ===
Year	Title	Label
2007	We'll Be Walking On Air	Independent

=== Singles ===
Year	Title	Album
2009	"Autumn"	The Things We've Grown To Love
