= Broken English (label) =

US record label

- Parent company: East West Records
- Genre: Rock
- Country of origin: US

Broken English is a part of the East West Records family of labels.

== See also ==
- List of record labels
