= 2010 in American music =

The following is a list of notable music events and releases that occurred in 2010 in the United States.

== Events ==
=== January ===
- 1 – Frontman Chris Cornell announces the reunion of Soundgarden.
  - Drummer Travis Barker announces that the Transplants would reunite for a new album and tour.
- 7 – Lady Gaga becomes the first artist in the survey's 17-year history to send her first five singles to number one on the Billboard Pop Songs chart with her single "Bad Romance".
- 11 – System of a Down bassist Shavo Odadjian makes a Twitter post, which read: "Are u guys ready for System???", leading to speculation of a reunion. However, weeks later, frontman Serj Tankian stated that System of a Down's hiatus is not over yet while adding: "We always have offers to play, from festivals and stuff, but we have not decided to do anything as of yet".
- 13 – R&B and soul legend Teddy Pendergrass dies at age 59.
  - Jay Reatard is found dead in his sleep at the age of 29, with the cause of death being cocaine intoxication.
- 18 – The surviving members of Sublime settle their lawsuit over use of the band's name. The new version of Sublime (featuring Rome Ramirez, Eric Wilson and Bud Gaugh) performed together as Sublime with Rome (up until their dissolution in 2024).
- 22 – Hope for Haiti Now telethon. Featuring performances from Wyclef Jean, Christina Aguilera, Beyoncé, Madonna, Bruce Springsteen, Jennifer Hudson, Mary J. Blige, Shakira, Sting, Alicia Keys, Dave Matthews, Neil Young, John Legend, Justin Timberlake, Stevie Wonder, Justin Bieber, Taylor Swift, Emeline Michel, Keith Urban, Kid Rock, Sheryl Crow, Coldplay, Bono, The Edge, Jay-Z, and Rihanna.
- 27 – Hope for Haiti Now becomes the first digital-only album to top Billboard 200 albums chart and the largest pre-order album on iTunes until broken in 2012 by Madonna's album MDNA. The album sold 171,000 copies in two days of release and since then became available on Amazon.com and Rhapsody.
- 29 – The Red Hot Chili Peppers make their live comeback with new guitarist, Josh Klinghoffer, paying tribute to Neil Young at MusiCares.
- 31 – The 52nd Annual Grammy Awards were held at the Staples Center in Los Angeles, California. Beyoncé breaks a record, winning 6 Grammys in one night, including Song of The Year for "Single Ladies (Put A Ring on It)". Taylor Swift wins 4 Grammys, including Album of The Year for Fearless. At just 20 years old Swift became the youngest ever winner of Album of the Year.

=== February ===
- 4 – Justice Jacobson ruled Larrikin's copyright had been infringed because the Men at Work song "Down Under" reproduced "a substantial part of "Kookaburra"".
- 12 – The remake of the 1985 song "We Are The World" for victims of the 2010 Haiti earthquake debuts during the opening ceremonies of the 2010 Winter Olympics.
- 14 – Doug Fieger, frontman of The Knack, dies of cancer at the age of 57.
- 16 – Zoli Téglás (of Ignite) officially becomes the new singer of Pennywise, replacing Jim Lindberg who left last August.
- 18 – The charity single "We Are the World 25 for Haiti" debuted at No. 2 on Billboard Hot 100 singles chart with 267,000 digital downloads and debuted at No. 1 on Billboard Hot Digital Songs chart.

=== March ===
- March 15 – Rock and Roll Hall of Fame inductions, Waldorf Astoria Hotel, NYC.
  - Lady Gaga becomes the first artist in the survey's 17-year history to send her first six singles to number-one (let alone six consecutive singles) on Billboard Pop Songs chart when her single "Telephone" jumped to number one.
- 17–21 – South By South West Festival takes place in Austin, Texas.
- 18 – Rihanna's "Rude Boy" reaches No. 1 on the Billboard Hot 100, becoming her sixth no. 1 tying her fifth among females to reach no. 1 in the US, and making her the female with the most no. 1 singles since 2000.
- 20 – Jughead's Revenge perform their first reunion show at the Scotland Yard Pub in Canoga Park, California.

=== April ===
- 1 – Canadian teen pop/R&B singer Justin Bieber debuts at No. 1 on the Billboard 200 after the release of his latter debut studio album My World 2.0. At sixteen years old, it makes him the youngest solo male act to top the chart since 1963 when Stevie Wonder did with The 12 Year Old Genius, and the first artist to occupy two top five spots on the chart since Nelly in 2004. With the album, Bieber also became the second youngest artist overall to achieve the number one, only being beaten out by a fifteen-year-old Miley Cyrus in 2008 with Breakout.
- 14 – Type O Negative singer and bassist Peter Steele dies of heart failure at age 48.
- 18 – The 45th Annual Academy of Country Music Awards took place in Las Vegas. Carrie Underwood became the first female in history to win Entertainer of the Year twice, as well as consecutively.
- 19 – Gangstarr emcee Guru suffered a heart attack, went into a coma, and died at age 48.
- 20 – Sublime with Rome, the new version of the defunct ska punk band with the same name, began their first world tour together, with possible new material to follow.

=== May ===
- 4 – Bone Thugs-n-Harmony released their reunion album with all original five members entitled Uni5: The World's Enemy.
  - – Deftones released their first studio album in nearly four years, Diamond Eyes. It is their first album without original bassist Chi Cheng following his November 2008 car crash which eventually led to his death in April 2013.
- 11 – Social Distortion sign a deal with Epitaph Records, who would release the band's first album since 2004's Sex, Love and Rock 'n' Roll in the fall. The album's release would later be delayed to January 2011.
- 22-23 – Rock on the Range in Columbus, Ohio, sets its festival attendance record with over 60,000 attendees over the two-day event.
- 24 – Slipknot bassist Paul Gray dies in an Iowa hotel room from an accidental overdose
- 26 – Lee DeWyze is crowned winner of the ninth season of American Idol while Crystal Bowersox is named runner-up.

=== June ===
- 4 – Christina Aguilera released her fourth studio album Bionic, and debuts No. 3 on the Billboard 200, charting within the top ten, the album became Aguilera's fifth straight top ten album, selling 110,000 copies in its first week. Bionic is the first studio album in four years since Back to Basics (2006).
- 15 – Devo releases Something for Everybody, their first album in 20 years.
- 21 – Rap superstar Eminem releases his seventh album Recovery in the U.S. which spent seven weeks at number one on billboard's top 200 and was the top selling album of 2010.
- 29 – Drake is sued by Playboy Enterprises over the use of the 1974 song "Fallin' In Love" by Hamilton, Joe Frank & Reynolds in Drake's 2009 hit "Best I Ever Had." Playboy, which owns the rights to "Fallin' In Love," claims Drake used the song's sample without permission and is seeking to claim any profits made from the Drake single.

=== July ===
- 6 – Enrique Iglesias released his first bilingual album Euphoria with contained equal amount of original English and Spanish tracks with two different singles successfully released to English and Latin formats simultaneously.
- 7 – Due to poor sales and possibly a decline in ratings and interest in this season's installment, the accompanying "American Idols LIVE! Tour 2010" cancels eight of its 38 shows.
  - Former Beatle Ringo Starr and his eleventh All-Starr Band perform at Radio City Music Hall for his seventieth birthday. During the closing song, "With a Little Help from My Friends" into "Give Peace a Chance", there were the following special guests: Steven Van Zandt, Nils Lofgren, Billy Squier, Men at Work's Colin Hay, Dr. John, Ray Davies, Zak Starkey (his son and The Who drummer), and Yoko Ono. His grandsons came out and gave him a birthday cake Ludwig drum set. Just when he thought the show was over, Paul McCartney came out and performed the Beatles classic, "Birthday".
- 13 – Korn's ninth studio album, Korn III: Remember Who You Are, debuts at number 2 on the Billboard 200 with 63,000 copies sold in its first week. Former fill-in drummer Ray Luzier is appointed as a permanent member of the band, confirming David Silveria's departure in 2006.

=== August ===
- 4 – Taylor Swift's lead single, "Mine" leaks and later Big Machine Record releases it on iTunes, becoming No. 1 after only 5 hours. It set a record for the fastest climbing song to number one.

=== September ===
- 12 – Lady Gaga sweeps the Video Music Awards, winning 8 awards, 7 for her "Bad Romance" video, and Best Collaboration for her song "Telephone" with Beyoncé. Gaga also gave an acceptance speech for Video of the Year in a dress made entirely of meat, she also announced the title of her third album, Born This Way which was released in May 2011. Lady Gaga was nominated for 13 VMA awards, the most in the show's history, and another 5 nominations for her contribution to Beyoncé's "Video Phone". Also, Justin Bieber won the award for Best New Artist, making him the youngest person to ever win a VMA.

=== October ===
- 5 – Chiodos released Illuminaudio, their only studio album to feature Brandon Bolmer (Yesterdays Rising) on lead vocals.

=== November ===
- 10 – The 44th Annual CMA Awards took place at the Bridgestone Arena in Nashville.
- 11 – The 11th Annual Latin Grammy Awards took place at the Mandalay Bay Events Center in Las Vegas.
- 21 – At the 2010 American Music Awards, Justin Bieber won all four of his nominations, including the award for Artist of The Year, becoming the youngest person in the show's 37-year history to win the award at 16.

=== December ===
- 9 – Jim Morrison, the former lead singer of The Doors, is granted a posthumous pardon, 39 years after his death. The pardon relates to a six-month prison sentence for indecent exposure handed to Morrison in 1969, following a performance in Miami earlier that year. Morrison had appealed his sentence, and died in 1971 without the matter being legally resolved.
- 18 – Josh and Zac Farro announce their exit from the band Paramore.

== Bands formed ==
- Bad Books
- Black Cards
- The Black Pacific
- Broadside
- Cali Swag District
- Car Seat Headrest
- Chastity Belt
- Cults
- The Damned Things
- Deafheaven
- Death Grips
- D.R.U.G.S.
- Flatbush Zombies
- Florida Georgia Line
- Friends
- Gayngs
- Giovannie and the Hired Guns
- Guards
- How to Destroy Angels
- Joywave
- JR JR
- The Julie Ruin
- Karmin
- Lord Huron
- Low Cut Connie
- Milo Greene
- MKTO
- The Mowgli's
- Niki and the Dove
- Parquet Courts
- Porches
- Real Friends
- State Champs
- Steve Taylor & The Perfect Foil
- Tedeschi Trucks Band
- Teen
- Tennis
- This Wild Life
- A Thousand Horses
- Times of Grace
- Turnstile
- Vacationer
- Whirr
- Widowspeak
- Wild Flag
- WZRD

== Bands reformed ==
- Adema
- Alabama
- Allister
- Autopsy
- Bone Thugs-n-Harmony
- Cap'n Jazz (touring only)
- The Cars
- The Dismemberment Plan (touring only)
- Dixie Chicks (touring only)
- The Dresden Dolls
- Fuel
- Guided by Voices (touring only)
- Hole
- Jughead's Revenge (touring only)
- Kumbia Kings
- Murderdolls
- Pavement (touring only)
- Piebald (touring only)
- The Receiving End of Sirens
- Revis
- Scars on Broadway
- Something Corporate
- Soundgarden
- Supercute!
- Swans
- System of a Down (touring in 2011)
- TLC
- Transplants
- Ugly Kid Joe
- Vatican Commandos
- Vendetta Red
- Yellowcard

== Bands on hiatus ==
- Breaking Benjamin
- Fall Out Boy (hiatus reconfirmed by band members in February after rumors of permanent breakup)
- Fear Before
- From First to Last
- Japanese Motors
- The Killers
- Poison the Well
- Pussycat Dolls
- Saving Jane
- Slipknot
- Static-X
- Straylight Run
- Them Crooked Vultures

== Bands disbanded ==
- 1997
- As Tall as Lions
- Big Star
- Brooks & Dunn
- Casiotone for the Painfully Alone
- Copeland
- Crime in Stereo
- Crossbreed
- Dio
- Dirty Little Rabbits
- Elefant
- Envy on the Coast
- The Exies
- Eyedea & Abilities
- The Fall of Troy
- Far
- Finch
- Gwen Stacy
- Heaven & Hell
- Isis
- The Jesus Lizard
- KSM
- Little Brother
- Low vs Diamond
- Lydia
- Magna-Fi
- Meese
- Metro Station
- Mudvayne
- My Favorite Highway
- The Number Twelve Looks Like You
- Pavement
- Pretty Balanced
- Psyclon Nine
- Remy Zero
- Revolting Cocks
- Scary Kids Scaring Kids
- SHeDAISY
- Simon & Garfunkel
- Sing It Loud
- Sparklehorse
- These Arms Are Snakes
- Type O Negative
- Voxtrot
- The Young Veins

== Albums released ==
All releases are LPs unless otherwise stated.

=== January ===
January 4

- Lana Del Ray by Lana Del Rey

January 5

- Animal by Kesha
- Unbroken by Katharine McPhee
- VH1 Storytellers: Kanye West by Kanye West

January 8

- Into the Roaring by Night Riots

January 11

- Contra by Vampire Weekend
- Superficial by Heidi Montag

January 12

- Ghosts on the Boardwalk by The Bouncing Souls
- Of the Blue Colour of the Sky by OK Go
- Ollusion by Omarion
- Rain or Shine (Live) by O.A.R.

January 14

- Two Song Wedding by Kate Maki

January 19

- Behave Yourself (EP) by Cold War Kids
- The Colossus by RJD2
- End Times by Eels
- My Dinosaur Life by Motion City Soundtrack
- Scenes from Hell by Sigh
- Transference by Spoon

January 22

- Time to Burn (Special Edition) by Taking Dawn

January 25

- Teen Dream by Beach House
- Wake Me by Tal & Acacia

January 26

- Ancient Electrons by Analog Rebellion
- Be in Love by Locksley
- Besides, Nothing (B-Sides and Rarities, 2003-2009) by PlayRadioPlay!
- Eggs by Oh No Ono
- The Emptiness by Alesana
- The Greatest Love Songs of all Time by Barry Manilow
- The Infinite Order by Living Sacrifice
- Need You Now by Lady Antebellum
- Realism by Magnetic Fields
- Romance Is Boring by Los Campesinos!
- The Sea by Corinne Bailey Rae
- To the Secrets and Knowledge by Number One Gun
- The Upsides by The Wonder Years
- Veracity by Evacuate Chicago
- 2 by Retribution Gospel Choir

January 28

- WWE The Music: A New Day, Vol. 10 by Various Artists

=== February ===
February 1

- The Courage of Others by Midlake

February 2

- Adventure Stories (Not Based on Fact?) by ...soihadto...
- Blackjazz by Shining
- Hellbilly Deluxe 2 by Rob Zombie
- The Northern Key by The Northern Key
- Public Square by This Moment in Black History
- Rebirth by Lil Wayne
- The Soft Pack by The Soft Pack
- 100 Proof: The Hangover by Statik Selektah
- Who I Am by Nick Jonas & the Administration

February 3

- Wild One (EP) by Rooney

February 5

- Atlas Drugged by Look What I Did
- Mechanized by Fear Factory

February 9

- Another Round by Jaheim
- Haywire by Josh Turner
- Heligoland by Massive Attack
- Ironbound by Overkill
- Odd Blood by Yeasayer
- One Life Stand by Hot Chip
- Screamworks: Love in Theory and Practice by HIM
- Soldier of Love by Sade
- Talking to You, Talking to Me by The Watson Twins

February 14

- Love by Angels & Airwaves

February 16

- The Constant by Story of the Year
- Minor Love by Adam Green
- Peace and Love by Juliana Hatfield

February 23

- Of Men and Angels by The Rocket Summer
- Say Us by Zeus

February 24

- YelloWhite by MellowHype

=== March ===
March 2

- American Ghetto by Portugal. The Man
- Black Ribbons by Shooter Jennings
- Jason Derülo by Jason Derülo
- My Best Days by Danny Gokey
- Permalight by Rogue Wave
- Smoke & Mirrors by Lifehouse
- Victory by DJ Khaled

March 3

- Vital Signs by The Revivalists

March 9

- Battle of the Sexes by Ludacris
- Beat The Devil's Tattoo by Black Rebel Motorcycle Club
- The Brutalist Bricks by Ted Leo and the Pharmacists
- Elect the Dead Symphony (Live album) by Serj Tankian
- Enemy of the World by Four Year Strong
- Gold (EP) by Si*Sé
- Heat Fetish by The Bled
- Pieces of a Real Heart by Sanctus Real
- Plastic Beach by Gorillaz
- Sisterworld by Liars
- The World Is a Thorn by Demon Hunter

March 15

- Planet Anthem by Disco Biscuits

March 16

- Calidosound by Superlitio
- Live on Lansdowne, Boston MA by Dropkick Murphys
- Survival Story by Flobots
- Throne to the Wolves by From First to Last
- Great Danger by The Audition

March 17

- Now is the Hour by Jennifer Rush

March 23

- Eparistera Daimones by Triptykon
- Interpreting the Masters Volume 1: A Tribute to Daryl Hall and John Oates by The Bird and the Bee
- My World 2.0 by Justin Bieber
- Option Paralysis by The Dillinger Escape Plan

March 26

- Raymond vs. Raymond by Usher
- Sticky & Sweet (Live album) by Madonna

March 30

- Evelyn Evelyn by Evelyn Evelyn
- Lowcountry by Envy on the Coast
- Paper Tongues by Paper Tongues
- Somewhere Down the Road by Amy Grant
- New Amerykah Part Two (Return of the Ankh) by Erykah Badu

=== April ===
April 6

- The Fear Is Excruciating, But Therein Lies the Answer by Red Sparowes
- Shame, Shame by Dr. Dog
- Women and Country by Jakob Dylan
- 12 Gauge by Kalmah

April 8

- Air Swell by Chiddy Bang

April 13

- Virtues by Amber Pacific
- Bleeding Through by Bleeding Through
- Congratulations by MGMT
- Jason Castro by Jason Castro
- Leave Your Sleep by Natalie Merchant
- Year of the Black Rainbow by Coheed and Cambria
- 18.61 by 108
- $ by Mark Sultan

April 19

- Hang Cool Teddy Bear by Meat Loaf

April 20

- Based on a True Story by Sick of It All
- Blue Sky Noise by Circa Survive
- Cold Day Memory by Sevendust
- Hospital Bomber EP by Heavy Heavy Low Low
- Long Live the Kings by Kottonmouth Kings
- Rise Up by Cypress Hill
- Travellers in Space and Time by The Apples in Stereo

April 21

- Clinging to a Scheme by The Radio Dept.

April 27

- B.o.B Presents: The Adventures of Bobby Ray by B.o.B.

April 30

- The Frozen Tears of Angels by Rhapsody of Fire

=== May ===
May 4

- Diamond Eyes by Deftones
- Omni by Minus the Bear
- The Oracle by Godsmack
- White Crosses by Against Me!

May 11

- Everything Collide by Sing It Loud
- Plead the Fifth by Taproot
- The Powerless Rise by As I Lay Dying
- Sea of Cowards by The Dead Weather
- Tear the World Down by We Are the Fallen
- Treats by Sleigh Bells

May 14

- Flesh Tone by Kelis

May 17

- Road Salt One by Pain of Salvation

May 18

- The ArchAndroid (Suites II and III) by Janelle Monáe
- Brothers by The Black Keys
- Distant Relatives by Nas & Damian Marley
- Exhibit B: The Human Condition by Exodus
- This Is Happening by LCD Soundsystem

May 21

- Facemelter by Y&T

May 25

- A Promise to Burn by Framing Hanley
- At Night We Live by Far
- Dirty Side Down by Widespread Panic
- The Family Jewels by Marina and the Diamonds
- Iconos by Marc Anthony
- Stone Temple Pilots by Stone Temple Pilots
- Teargarden by Kaleidyscope, Vol. 1: Songs for a Sailor by The Smashing Pumpkins

May 31

- Justice by Molly Hatchet

=== June ===
June 1

- Skeletons by Hawthorne Heights
- The Bride Screamed Murder by Melvins

June 7

- The Drums by The Drums

June 8

- Attack Attack! by Attack Attack!
- Bionic by Christina Aguilera
- Eureka by Rooney
- Goon Affiliated by Plies
- Lazarus by Travie McCoy
- Love Like Crazy by Lee Brice
- Miss America by Saving Abel
- The Obsidian Conspiracy by Nevermore
- Shout It Out by Hanson
- Sweet and Wild by Jewel
- Up on the Ridge by Dierks Bentley

June 14

- American Slang by The Gaslight Anthem
- Further by The Chemical Brothers

June 15

- Antifogmatic by Punch Brothers
- Bingo! by Steve Miller Band
- Body Talk Pt. 1 by Robyn
- I'm Alive, I'm Dreaming by The Ready Set
- Imperial by In Fear and Faith
- Laws of Illusion by Sarah McLachlan
- Lustre by Ed Harcourt
- Mojo by Tom Petty and the Heartbreakers
- Now 34 by Various Artists
- On the Rural Route 7609 (Compilation) by John Mellencamp
- Something for Everybody by Devo
- Thank Me Later by Drake
- Time Flies... 1994–2009 by Oasis
- To the Sky by Kevin Rudolf
- The Universe Is Laughing by The Guggenheim Grotto

June 16

- Countdown to Nowhere by Allister

June 18

- We Are Born by Sia
- Can't Be Tamed by Miley Cyrus

June 21

- Recovery by Eminem
- Suddenly by Allstar Weekend

June 22

- Truth or Dare by Automatic Loveletter
- Deth Red Sabaoth by Danzig
- GangRags by Blaze Ya Dead Homie
- Getting Dressed in the Dark by Jaron and the Long Road to Love
- Summer Happiness (Acoustic EP) by David Crowder Band

June 28

- Deep Blue by Parkway Drive

June 29

- Attack of the Wolf King by Haste the Day
- Clockwork by Angelus Apatrida
- Love King by The-Dream
- Streets of Gold by 3OH!3

=== July ===
July 6

- Alive by Ed Kowalczyk
- Euphoria by Enrique Iglesias

July 7

- Korn III – Remember Who You Are by Korn

July 12

- Dark Night of the Soul by Danger Mouse and Sparklehorse

July 13

- Black and White by The Maine
- Born Again by Newsboys
- Heart of a Champion by Paul Wall
- Intriguer by Crowded House
- Judge Jerrod & the Hung Jury by Jerrod Niemann
- Masts of Manhatta by Tracy Bonham
- Maya by M.I.A.
- Meridional by Norma Jean
- The Panic Broadcast by Soilwork
- Phoenix by Just Surrender
- Pilot Talk by Curren$y
- Safe Upon the Shore by Great Big Sea
- Stampede by Hellyeah
- The War Report 2: Report the War by Capone-N-Noreaga

July 15

- Best Regards by Buckethead, Bryan, and Melissa

July 20

- Gift Horse by Mose Giganticus
- The Heart by Jimmy Gnecco
- Listening Booth: 1970 by Marc Cohn
- The Only Easy Day Was Yesterday (EP) by 12 Stones
- Rocksteady by Big Head Todd and the Monsters
- Summer Tour EP by Paramore
- Teflon Don by Rick Ross
- We Stitch These Wounds by Black Veil Brides
- 100 Miles from Memphis by Sheryl Crow

July 25

- On Melancholy Hill (EP) by Gorillaz

July 27

- Anybody Out There by Rufio
- Collisions and Castaways by 36 Crazyfists
- Crazy for You by Best Coast
- The Darkside Vol. 1 by Fat Joe
- Dre by Soulja Boy
- Formalities by The Spill Canvas
- Fortress by Miniature Tigers
- Mines by Menomena
- The Narrative by The Narrative
- Nightmare by Avenged Sevenfold
- Praise & Blame by Tom Jones
- Round Trip by Tony Harnell & The Mercury Train

July 29

- Witchkrieg by Witchery

=== August ===
August 3

- King of the Beach by Wavves
- Hear Me Now by Secondhand Serenade
- The Remix by Lady Gaga
- The Suburbs by Arcade Fire

August 17

- Fight the Frequency by American Hi-Fi
- God Willing and the Creek Don't Rise by Ray Lamontagne & The Pariah Dogs
- No Better Than This by John Mellencamp
- The Trouble with Angels by Filter
- Foundling by David Gray

August 24

- Back to Me by Fantasia Barrino
- Sugar by Dead Confederate
- Stay Strong by Debora Iyall
- Teenage Dream by Katy Perry

August 31

- Feeding The Wolves by 10 Years
- Asylum by Disturbed
- Fission by Film School
- Only Every Time by The Graduate
- Time for Annihilation by Papa Roach
- Icon (compilation) by Nirvana
- Terrible Things by Terrible Things

=== September ===
September 7

- Personal Life by The Thermals
- Seeing Eye Dog by Helmet
- Audio Secrecy by Stone Sour
- Body Talk Pt. 2 by Robyn
- Prepare the Preparations by Ludo
- Everything Under the Sun by Jukebox the Ghost
- Interpol by Interpol
- Kaleidoscope Heart by Sara Bareilles
- Dark is the Way, Light is a Place by Anberlin

September 14

- The Black Pacific by The Black Pacific
- Business Casual by Chromeo
- Flamingo by Brandon Flowers
- The Gracious Few by The Gracious Few
- Hurley by Weezer
- Passion, Pain & Pleasure by Trey Songz
- Poetry for the Poisoned by Kamelot
- Relentless Retribution by Death Angel
- A Thousand Suns by Linkin Park
- Airtight's Revenge by Bilal

September 21

- Hands All Over by Maroon 5
- My Darkest Days by My Darkest Days
- No Gravity by Shontelle
- A Year Without Rain by Selena Gomez & the Scene
- Wake Up! by John Legend and The Roots
- You Get What You Give by Zac Brown Band

September 23

- My Father Will Guide Me up a Rope to the Sky by Swans
- Last Day of Summer by White Denim

September 28

- All About You by Jeremih
- The Dissent of Man by Bad Religion
- Invented by Jimmy Eat World
- In the Absence of Light by Abigail Williams
- Outkasted Outlawz by Hussein Fatal & Nutt-So
- Rehab by Lecrae
- No Chocolate Cake by Gin Blossoms

=== October ===
October 5

- Black Swans and Wormhole Wizards by Joe Satriani
- Doo-Wops & Hooligans by Bruno Mars
- Fight or Flight by Emily Osment
- The Other Side of Down by David Archuleta
- Illuminaudio by Chiodos
- Life Turns Electric by Finger Eleven
- There Is Nowhere Left to Go (EP) by Ben Jorgensen

October 11

- B.T.R. by Big Time Rush
- The Preview by Chiddy Bang

October 12

- Turning On by Cloud Nothings
- Charleston, SC 1966 by Darius Rucker
- Playlist: The Very Best of Jessica Simpson by Jessica Simpson

October 19

- Come Around Sundown by Kings of Leon
- Hannah Montana Forever by Hannah Montana
- The Incredible Machine by Sugarland
- Words Words Words by Bo Burnham

October 22

- Omega Wave by Forbidden

October 25

- Speak Now by Taylor Swift

October 26

- Young the Giant (digital) by Young the Giant

October 27

- Cardiology by Good Charlotte

=== November ===
November 2

- Merry Christmas II You by Mariah Carey
- Burning Bush Supper Club by Bear Hands
- My Kinda Party by Jason Aldean

November 9

- Would It Kill You? by Hellogoodbye
- All The Women I Am by Reba McEntire
- Coal Miner's Daughter: A Tribute To Loretta Lynn by Loretta Lynn
- Ø (Disambiguation) by Underoath

November 16

- What Separates Me from You by A Day to Remember
- Live It Up by Lee DeWyze
- Born Free by Kid Rock
- Nelly 5.0 by Nelly
- Loud by Rihanna
- I Want! I Want! by Walk the Moon

November 22

- The Hits Collection, Volume One by Jay-Z
- Burlesque: Original Motion Picture Soundtrack by Christina Aguilera & Cher
- Danger Days: The True Lives of the Fabulous Killjoys by My Chemical Romance
- Happy Christmas by Jessica Simpson
- My Beautiful Dark Twisted Fantasy by Kanye West
- Cannibal by Ke$ha
- Live in London by Regina Spektor
- Pink Friday by Nicki Minaj
- Pilot Talk 2 by Curren$y

November 23

- Libra Scale by Ne-Yo
- The Moment by Atomic Tom
- Teargarden by Kaleidyscope, Vol. 2: The Solstice Bare by The Smashing Pumpkins

November 30

- I Am... World Tour by Beyoncé
- All I Want Is You by Miguel
- Behind Closed Doors by Nu Jerzey Devil
- Doe Or Die: 15th Anniversary by AZ
- Easy 2 Hate by Haystak
- Free Agent by Joell Ortiz
- Only One Flo (Part 1) by Flo Rida
- The Beginning by The Black Eyed Peas
- The DeAndre Way by Soulja Boy
- The Life And Times of Peter Nelson by Copywrite
- Tha Thug Show by Slim Thug
- Like Trees in November by Chapter 14
- Let Freedom Reign by Chrisette Michele
- Love Me Back by Jazmine Sullivan
- Matter of Dayz by Daz Dillinger
- Niggaz With Latitude (NWL) by Deacon The Villain & Sheisty Khrist
- Number One Hits by Tim McGraw

=== December ===
December 7

- Just Charlie by Charlie Wilson
- No Mercy by T.I.
- Strip Me by Natasha Bedingfield

December 14

- Basic Instinct by Ciara
- Michael by Michael Jackson
- Last Train to Paris by Diddy-Dirty Money
- Love Letter by R. Kelly
- Now or Never by Tank

December 21

- The Letter by Avant
- Best Night of My Life by Jamie Foxx
- Calling All Hearts by Keyshia Cole
- No Boys Allowed by Keri Hilson

== Best-selling albums in the U.S. ==
The best-selling records in 2010 in the US according to Nielsen Soundscan:

Position	Album title	Artist
1	Recovery	Eminem
2	Need You Now	Lady Antebellum
3	Speak Now	Taylor Swift
4	My World 2.0	Justin Bieber
5	The Gift	Susan Boyle
6	The Fame	Lady Gaga
7	Soldier of Love	Sade
8	Thank Me Later	Drake
9	Raymond v. Raymond	Usher
10	Animal	Kesha

== Top songs on record ==
=== Billboard Hot 100 No. 1 Songs ===
- "Break Your Heart" – Taio Cruz featuring Ludacris (1 week)
- "California Gurls" – Katy Perry featuring Snoop Dogg (6 weeks)
- "Firework" – Katy Perry (2 weeks in 2010, 2 weeks in 2011)
- "Imma Be" – The Black Eyed Peas (2 weeks)
- "Love the Way You Lie" – Eminem featuring Rihanna (7 weeks)
- "Not Afraid" – Eminem (1 week)
- "Nothin' on You" – B.o.B featuring Bruno Mars (2 weeks)
- "Just the Way You Are" – Bruno Mars (4 weeks)
- "Like a G6" – Far East Movement featuring The Cataracs and Dev (3 weeks)
- "OMG" – Usher featuring will.i.am (4 weeks)
- "Only Girl (In the World)" – Rihanna (1 week)
- "Raise Your Glass" – Pink (1 week)
- "Rude Boy" – Rihanna (5 weeks)
- "Teenage Dream" – Katy Perry (2 weeks)
- "Tik Tok" – Kesha (9 weeks)
- "We R Who We R" – Kesha (1 week)
- "What's My Name?" – Rihanna featuring Drake (1 week)

=== Billboard Hot 100 Top 20 Hits ===
All songs that reached the Top 20 on the Billboard Hot 100 chart during the year, complete with peak chart placement.

- "3" – Britney Spears (#10 in 2010, #1 in 2009)
- "According to You" – Orianthi (#17)
- "Airplanes" – B.o.B featuring Hayley Williams (#2)
- "Alejandro" – Lady Gaga (#5)
- "All the Right Moves – OneRepublic (#18)
- "Already Gone" – Kelly Clarkson (#18 in 2010, #13 in 2009)
- "Animal" – Neon Trees (#13)
- "Baby" – Justin Bieber featuring Ludacris (#5)
- "Back to December" – Taylor Swift (#6)
- "Bad Romance" – Lady Gaga (#2)
- "BedRock" – Young Money featuring Lloyd (#2)
- "Billionaire" – Travie McCoy featuring Bruno Mars (#4)
- "Black and Yellow" – Wiz Khalifa (#6)
- "Blah Blah Blah" – Kesha featuring 3OH!3 (#7)
- "Bottoms Up" – Trey Songz featuring Nicki Minaj (#6)
- "Breakeven" – The Script (#12)
- "Break Your Heart" – Taio Cruz featuring Ludacris (#1)
- "Bulletproof" – La Roux (#8)
- "California Gurls" – Katy Perry featuring Snoop Dogg (#1)
- "Can't Be Tamed" – Miley Cyrus (#8)
- "Carry Out" – Timbaland featuring Justin Timberlake (#11)
- "Club Can't Handle Me" – Flo Rida featuring David Guetta (#9)
- "Cooler Than Me" – Mike Posner (#6)
- "Deuces" – Chris Brown featuring Tyga and Kevin McCall (#14)
- "DJ Got Us Fallin' in Love" – Usher featuring Pitbull (#4)
- "Do You Remember" – Jay Sean featuring Sean Paul and Lil Jon (#10)
- "Down" – Jay Sean featuring Lil Wayne (#7 in 2010, #1 in 2009)
- "Drop the World" – Lil Wayne featuring Eminem (#18)
- "Dynamite" – Taio Cruz (#2)
- "Eenie Meenie – Sean Kingston and Justin Bieber (#15)
- "Empire State of Mind" – Jay-Z featuring Alicia Keys (#2 in 2010, #1 in 2009)
- "Find Your Love" – Drake (#5)
- "Fireflies" – Owl City (#4 in 2010, #1 in 2009)
- "Firework" – Katy Perry (#1)
- "Forever" – Drake featuring Kanye West, Lil Wayne, and Eminem (#16 in 2010, #8 in 2009)
- "Forget You" – Cee Lo Green (#9)
- "Forget You" – Glee Cast featuring Gwyneth Paltrow (#11)
- "Glitter in the Air" – Pink (#18)
- "Gonorrhea" – Lil Wayne featuring Drake (#17)
- "Grenade" – Bruno Mars(#3)
- "Hallelujah" – Justin Timberlake and Matt Morris featuring Charlie Sexton (#13)
- "Hard" – Rihanna featuring Jeezy (#8)
- "Hey, Soul Sister" – Train (#3)
- "How Low" – Ludacris (#6)
- "I Gotta Feeling" – The Black Eyed Peas (#9 in 2010, #1 in 2009)
- "I Like It" – Enrique Iglesias featuring Pitbull (#4)
- "If I Die Young" – The Band Perry (#19)
- "Imma Be" – The Black Eyed Peas (#1)
- "Impossible" – Shontelle (#13)
- "In My Head" – Jason Derülo (#5)
- "Just a Dream" – Nelly (#3)
- "Just the Way You Are" – Bruno Mars (#1)
- "Like a G6" – Far East Movement featuring The Cataracs and Dev (#1)
- "Live Like We're Dying" – Kris Allen (#18)
- "Love the Way You Lie" – Eminem featuring Rihanna (#1)
- "Magic" – B.o.B featuring Rivers Cuomo (#10)
- "Mean" – Taylor Swift (#11)
- "Meet Me Halfway" – The Black Eyed Peas (#9 in 2010, #7 in 2009)
- "Mine" – Taylor Swift (#3)
- "Misery" – Maroon 5 (#14)
- "Miss Me" – Drake featuring Lil Wayne (#15)
- "Monster" – Kanye West featuring Jay-Z, Rick Ross, Bon Iver and Nicki Minaj (#18)
- "My Chick Bad" – Ludacris featuring Nicki Minaj (#11)
- "My First Kiss" – 3OH!3 featuring Kesha (#9)
- "Need You Now" – Lady Antebellum (#2)
- "No Hands" – Waka Flocka Flame featuring Roscoe Dash and Wale (#16)
- "Not Afraid" – Eminem (#1)
- "Nothin' on You" – B.o.B featuring Bruno Mars (#1)
- "OMG" – Usher featuring will.i.am (#1)
- "One Time" – Justin Bieber (#17)
- "Only Girl (In the World)" – Rihanna (#1)
- "Over" – Drake (#14)
- "Paparazzi" – Lady Gaga (#14 in 2010, #6 in 2009)
- "Party in the U.S.A." – Miley Cyrus (#8 in 2010, #2 in 2009)
- "Please Don't Go" – Mike Posner (#16)
- "Poker Face" – Glee Cast (#20)
- "Raise Your Glass" – Pink (#1)
- "Replay" – Iyaz (#2)
- "Ridin' Solo" – Jason Derülo (#9)
- "Right Above It" – Lil Wayne featuring Drake (#6)
- "Rock That Body" – The Black Eyed Peas (#9)
- "Rude Boy" – Rihanna (#1)
- "Runaway – Kanye West featuring Pusha T (#12)
- "Say Aah" – Trey Songz featuring Fabolous (#9)
- "Sexy Chick" – David Guetta featuring Akon (#5)
- "Singin' in the Rain/Umbrella" – Glee Cast (#18)
- "Somebody to Love" – Justin Bieber (#15)
- "Sparks Fly" – Taylor Swift (#17)
- "Speak Now" – Taylor Swift (#8)
- "Stranded (Haiti Mon Amour)" – Jay-Z, Bono, The Edge and Rihanna (#16)
- "Stuck Like Glue" – Sugarland (#17)
- "Sweet Dreams" – Beyoncé (#17 in 2010, #10 in 2009)
- "Take It Off" – Kesha (#8)
- "Teenage Dream" – Glee Cast (#8)
- "Teenage Dream" – Katy Perry (#1)
- "Telephone" – Lady Gaga featuring Beyoncé (#3)
- "That's All She Wrote" – T.I. featuring Eminem (#18)
- "The Boys of Fall" – Kenny Chesney (#18)
- "The Time (Dirty Bit)" – The Black Eyed Peas (#4)
- "Today Was a Fairytale" – Taylor Swift (#2)
- "Tonight (I'm Lovin' You)" – Enrique Iglesias featuring Ludacris and DJ Frank E (#15)
- "Total Eclipse of the Heart" – Glee Cast (#16)
- "Toxic" – Glee Cast (#16)
- "Two Is Better Than One" – Boys Like Girls featuring Taylor Swift (#18)
- "We Are the World 25 for Haiti" – Artists for Haiti (#2)
- "We R Who We R" – Kesha (#1)
- "What's My Name?" – Rihanna featuring Drake (#1)
- "Whataya Want from Me" – Adam Lambert (#10)
- "Whatcha Say" – Jason Derülo (#6 in 2010, #1 in 2009)
- "When I Look at You" – Miley Cyrus (#16)
- "Whip My Hair" – Willow (#11)
- "You and Your Heart" – Jack Johnson (#20)
- "You Belong with Me" – Taylor Swift (#16 in 2010, #2 in 2009)
- "Young Forever" – Jay-Z featuring Mr. Hudson (#10)
- "Your Love" – Nicki Minaj (#14)
- "Your Love Is My Drug" – Kesha (#4)

== Deaths ==
January

- January 1 – Lhasa de Sela, 37, singer, breast cancer
- January 1 – Gregory Slay, 40, drummer for Remy Zero, cystic fibrosis
- January 4 – Tony Clarke, 68, The Moody Blues producer
- January 5 – Willie Mitchell, 81, producer and arranger, cardiac arrest
- January 7 – Thomas Sam Davis, a.k.a. Eric Shark, 59, singer for Deaf School, lung failure
- January 12 – Yabby You, 63, reggae singer and producer, brain aneurysm
- January 12 – Dannie Flesher, 58, Wax Trax! Records co-founder, pneumonia
- January 12 – Brian "Damage" Keats, 46, drummer for Misfits, liver cancer
- January 12 – Jimmy O, 35, Haitian musician of Barikad Crew, earthquake victim
- January 13 – Ed Thigpen, 79, jazz drummer
- January 13 – Teddy Pendergrass, 59, R&B singer, colon cancer
- January 13 – Jay Reatard, 29, garage punk singer and guitarist, cocaine toxicity
- January 14 – Bobby Charles, 71, songwriter and swamp pop musician
- January 14 – Chilton Price, 96, songwriter
- January 23 – Earl Wild, 94, pianist, congestive heart disease

February

- February 4 – Helen Tobias-Duesberg, 90, Estonian-American organist and composer
- February 13 – Dale Hawkins, 73, singer-songwriter and guitarist
- February 14 – Doug Fieger, 57, lead singer of The Knack, cancer
- February 14 – Lee Freeman, 60, guitarist for Strawberry Alarm Clock, cancer
- February 17 – Kathryn Grayson, 88, singer and actress
- February 23 – Chilly B, 47, rapper for Newcleus, stroke
- February 27 – Tom "T-Bone" Wolk, 58, bassist for Hall & Oates, stroke

March

- March 4 – Lolly Vegas, 70, lead singer of Redbone, lung cancer
- March 6 – Mark Linkous, 47, singer and guitarist for Sparklehorse, suicide
- March 10 – Evelyn Dall, singer and actress
- March 17 – Alex Chilton, 59, singer and guitarist for Big Star, heart attack
- March 28 – Herb Ellis, 88, jazz guitarist, Alzheimer's disease

April

- April 14 – Peter Steele, 48, singer and bassist for Type O Negative, heart failure
- April 19 – Guru, 48, rapper for Gangstarr, multiple myeloma
- April 30 – Owsley, 44, singer-songwriter, suicide

May

- May 3 – Chubby Carrier, 63, zydeco musician
- May 3 – Eddie L. Jackson, 63, guitarist for Brenda & The Tabulations
- May 7 – Dave Fisher, 69, singer, musician for The Highwaymen
- May 9 – Lena Horne, 92, singer and actress, heart failure
- May 16 – Hank Jones, 91, jazz pianist and bandleader
- May 16 – Ronnie James Dio, 67, singer for Elf, Rainbow, Black Sabbath, Heaven & Hell and Dio, stomach cancer
- May 19 – Larry Dale, 87, blues musician
- May 23 – Billy Francis, 68, rock keyboardist (Dr. Hook & the Medicine Show)
- May 24 – Paul Gray, 38, bassist for Slipknot
- May 26 – Judy Lynn, 74, country singer
- May 28 – Slim Bryant, 101, country singer-songwriter

June

- June 5 – Tony Peluso, 60, guitarist, record producer
- June 6 – Marvin Isley, 56, bassist for The Isley Brothers
- June 7 – Oliver N'Goma, 51, Gabonese singer and guitarist
- June 7 – Stuart Cable, 40, drummer for The Stereophonics
- June 13 – Jimmy Dean, 81, country singer
- June 15 – Busi Mhlongo, 62, South African singer
- June 16 – Bill Dixon, 84, jazz musician
- June 16 – Garry Shider, 56, guitarist for Parliament-Funkadelic, brain cancer
- June 23 – Pete Quaife, 66, original bassist for The Kinks
- June 24 – Fred Anderson, 81, avant-garde jazz musician
- June 26 – Benny Powell, 80, jazz trombonist with Lionel Hampton and Count Basie
- June 26 – Sergio Vega, 40, Mexican singer, stage name "El Shaka"
- June 27 – Rammellzee, 49, hip hop musician, graffiti artist

July

- July 1 – Ilene Woods, 81, singer, actress
- July 6 – Harvey Fuqua, 80, singer for The Moonglows and record producer
- July 10 – Sugar Minott, 54, reggae singer
- July 11 – Walter Hawkins, 61, gospel singer, pancreatic cancer
- July 12 – Tuli Kupferberg, 86, poet and singer for The Fugs
- July 13 – Olga Guillot, 87, Cuban singer, "Queen of Bolero"
- July 14 – Gene Ludwig, 72, jazz organist
- July 15 – Hank Cochran, 74, country singer-songwriter, brother of Eddie Cochran
- July 15 – Yandé Codou Sène, 78, Senegalese singer
- July 17 – Fred Carter, Jr., 76, guitarist, songwriter, producer
- July 19 – Andy Hummel, 59, bassist for Big Star, cancer
- July 26 – Al Goodman, 63, singer for The Moments and Ray, Goodman & Brown
- July 27 – Ben Keith, 73, guitarist, steel guitarist, musician and producer
- July 31 – Mitch Miller, 99, producer, musician

August

- August 3 – Mitch Jayne, 82, bassist for bluegrass band The Dillards
- August 3 – Bobby Hebb, 72, soul singer
- August 6 – Chris Dedrick, 62, singer for The Free Design
- August 6 – Catfish Collins, 66, guitarist with James Brown, Parliament/Funkadelic and brother to Bootsy Collins
- August 8 – Ted Kowalski, 79, singer with Canadian doo-wop group, The Diamonds
- August 10 – Dana Dawson, 36, soul singer, actress
- August 12 – Richie Hayward, 64, drummer for Little Feat, and with Bonnie Raitt and Eric Clapton among others
- August 14 – Abbey Lincoln, 80, jazz singer, actress
- August 15 – Ahmad Alaadeen, 76, jazz musician
- August 18 – Kenny Edwards, 64, pianist, singer-songwriter. In The Stone Poneys with Linda Ronstadt
- August 19 – Michael Been, 60, singer and guitarist for The Call
- August 20 – Charles Haddon, 22, member of Ou Est Le Swimming Pool
- August 23 – Bill Phillips, 74, country singer

September

- September 8 – Rich Cronin, 36, lead singer and songwriter for LFO
- September 11 – King Coleman, 78, R&B singer
- September 15 – Arrow, 60, Montserratian soca musician
- September 19 – Buddy Collette, 89, jazz saxophonist
- September 20 – Leonard Skinner, 77, schoolteacher and namesake of Lynyrd Skynyrd, Alzheimer's disease
- September 22 – Eddie Fisher, 82, vocalist
- September 27 – Buddy Morrow, 91, aka Moe Zudekoff, jazz bandleader, trombonist

October

- October 8 – Albertina Walker, 81, gospel singer and member of The Caravans
- October 10 – Dame Joan Sutherland, 83, opera soprano
- October 10 – Solomon Burke, 70, R&B singer
- October 13 – General Norman Johnson, 69, singer for Chairmen of the Board, songwriter and producer
- October 16 – Eyedea, 28, rapper and guitarist for Eyedea & Abilities
- October 22 – Denis Simpson, 60, singer for the Canadian band, The Nylons
- October 25 – Gregory Isaacs, 59, reggae singer

December

- December 18 – Bob Demmon, 71, rock and roll guitarist (The Astronauts)
- December 24 – Myrna Smith, 69, singer and songwriter (The Sweet Inspirations)
- December 26 – Teena Marie, 54, white R&B singer

== See also ==
- Category:2010 in American music
- 2010s in music
- 2010 in American television
