= If You Speak Any Faster =

Studio album by June
- Released: August 23, 2005
- Recorded: March–April 2005
- Studio: Salad Days, Baltimore, Maryland
- Genre: Pop punk, emo
- Length: 37:32
- Label: Victory
- Producer: Brian McTernan

June chronology
The June EP (2004)	If You Speak Any Faster (2005)	Make It Blur (2007)

If You Speak Any Faster is the debut studio album released by American rock band June. It was released in August 2005 through Victory Records.

== Background and composition ==
June formed in early 2000s, consisting of vocalist/guitarist Tim Brennan, bassist/vocalist AJ Brown, guitarist Mark Palacz, and drummer Mark Sutor. The group self-released The June EP in summer 2004 and toured in August. The band signed to Victory in October. Following the signing, the band immediately started writing songs for their debut album until December. Typically, Sutor and Brennan would figure the structure of the song out before Brennan and Palacz would write their guitar parts. During this, Brown writes the lyrics then help Brennan arrange the melody. Around this time, Sutor had been listening to Jimmy Eat World, Foo Fighters, "a lot of Victory stuff", Gatsbys American Dream, and The Format.

== Recording ==
In early March 2005, the band started recording at Salad Days in Baltimore, Maryland with producer Brian McTernan. First week was pre-production which resulted in various changes to the songs. Following this, the band recorded the album in three weeks. Two songs from The June EP, "OK Corral" and "You Had It Coming", were re-recorded during these sessions. McTernan made the band "work hard from the get go and it's paying off", according to Sutor. McTernan "never sugarcoats things, he is very honest with how you're doing and what you're doing wrong/right." The band were originally going to record 14 songs, but cut the number down to 12. By April 11, all of the music was recorded, leaving vocals left to do. The recordings were sent for mastering in May.

== Release ==
In May 2005, the band toured the US alongside Punchline, This Day and Age and Jupiter Sunrise. In July 2005, the band supported the Academy Is... and Plain White T's. In August and September 2005, the band toured the US with the likes of Halifax and Silverstein. On August 2, 2005, "Elevators Are Matchmakers" was posted on the band's PureVolume account; If You Speak Any Faster was released on August 23, 2005, through Victory Records. Jac Vanek is featured on the album's artwork. The artwork had been suggested by a friend and by Double J, a graphics artist for Victory. The album's title "reflects the general feel of the album." The group originally wished for images that "looked very sharp" and be representative of the album's songs. Following this, June went on a cross-country US tour with Bayside, I Am the Avalanche, and the Forecast, running into October 2005. They went on a brief East Coast tour with Days Away, the Junior Varsity, and Sound the Alarm. From late October to late November, the band toured with The Juliana Theory, JamisonParker, We Are the Fury and For the World. In November and December, the band went on the Too Cold for School tour alongside Scary Kids Scaring Kids, Just Surrender, The Panic Division and For the World.

In January 2006, the band went on a short tour alongside the Audition, Small Towns Burn a Little Slower and Forgive Durden. "My Side of the Story" was made available for streaming on January 17 via PureVolume. In February and March 2006, the group went on a tour of the U.S. alongside Hawthorne Heights, Emery, Anberlin and Bleed the Dream. On April 2, 2006, the music video for "My Side of the Story" was posted online. Following this, they appeared at The Bamboozle festival. In May and June, the band went on their first headlining tour, dubbed The Dead or Alive Give Up or Survive Tour. For the first half, the band was supported by This Day and Age, Valencia, This Providence and the Forecast. For the second half, the group was supported by Houston Calls, Just Surrender, the Junior Varsity, and As Tall as Lions. In between dates on this tour, the band played a number of in-store performances at music stores.

"The City" was made available for streaming on June 1 via PureVolume. In June and July, the band supported Thirty Seconds to Mars. They performed on the Smartpunk stage at that year's Warped Tour. In August, the band toured with Halifax, The Classic Crime, and So They Say. Also in August, the band made an appearance at Dirt Fest in Birch Run, Michigan. In October, the band toured alongside This Providence, Park, and Tyler Read.

== Reception ==
Professional ratings
Review scores
Source	Rating
Melodic	3/5 stars

The album charted at number 38 on the Heatseekers Albums chart, and at number 49 on the Independent Albums chart. By April 2006, the album had sold over 29,000 copies. Ben Conoley of Punknews.org wrote that the album "is simply void of any sense of originality or character." Although, he praised the album's production as being "spot-on", giving the band a "more polished" sound. He concluded with calling it "sharp, but at the end of the day, it's totally useless."

== Track listing ==
1. "Speak Up" – 3:13
2. "Patrick" – 3:28
3. "OK Corral" – 3:05
4. "My Side of the Story" – 3:36
5. "Elevators Are Matchmakers" – 4:03
6. "Scandals and Scoundrels" – 3:27
7. "The City" – 3:27
8. "Invitations" – 3:31
9. "I Write B Movies" – 3:12
10. "You Had It Coming" – 3:52
11. "I've Got the Time If You Have the Argument" – 2:32
