= Controversy Loves Company =

Studio album by the Audition
- Released: September 20, 2005
- Recorded: April 2005
- Studio: Nada, New Windsor, New York
- Genre: Pop-punk
- Length: 30:32
- Label: Victory
- Producer: John Naclerio

The Audition chronology
All in Your Head (2004)	Controversy Loves Company (2005)	Champion (2008)

Controversy Loves Company is the debut studio album by American rock band the Audition, released on September 20, 2005 through Victory Records. After some membership changes, the band released their debut EP in mid-2004, and by November 2004, they had signed to Victory Records. With Danny Stevens moving from guitarist to vocalist, the band spent three months writing material, until they recorded their debut album in April 2005. Sessions were held at Nada Studios in New Windsor, New York with producer John Naclerio. Controversy Loves Company is a pop-punk album that drew comparison to the work of Fall Out Boy, Hot Rod Circuit, and Taking Back Sunday.

Controversy Loves Company received mixed reviews from critics, some of whom praised the musicianship and songwriting, while others considered it uninspiring. Prior to the album's release, the Audition appeared at The Bamboozle festival and went on a two-month tour of the United States. Following this, they toured with labelmates Spitalfield until the end of the year, and opened 2006 touring with June. The Audition went on a West Coast tour with Mae, before embarking on separate tours with Punchline and Emanuel. The band then toured the UK and supported Thirty Seconds to Mars on their US trek, later appearing on the Warped Tour. They went on their first headlining US tour in mid-2006, prior to a UK tour with other Victory bands.

== Background and production ==
The Audition formed in February 2002 in Elmhurst, Illinois, with a line-up consisting of vocalist Evo Soria, guitarists Bob Morris and Dan Lucking, bassist Joe Lussa, and drummer Ryan O'Connor. They recorded a demo and starting gigging alongside other Chicago-born bands, such as the Academy Is... In September 2003, Lucking was replaced by Pat Finella. In March and April 2004, the band played a handful of shows around Illinois; In May 2004, they released their debut EP, It's All In Your Head through local label 13th Floor Records, which was promoted with a summer tour throughout June and July 2004. On November 19, 2004, it was announced that the group had signed to independent label Victory Records.

The Audition had sent demos to different labels, including Victory, which caught the attention of founder Tony Brummel. Brummel emailed them, stating that he liked the song; the band wrote more material, before he was invited to hear what they were working on at O'Connor's house. Morris left to form the Hush Sound, and Danny Stevens of Only in Movies was brought in as his replacement. They wrote new material and played further shows until a month later, when Soria wished to return to education, at which point, Stevens moved to vocals. Writing sessions lasted for three months, until April 2005, when they recorded Controversy Loves Company. Recording sessions for were held at Nada Studios in New Windsor, New York with producer John Naclerio, who also mixed and mastered it. The band had recorded 13-to-14 songs, one of which was left unfinished.

== Composition and lyrics ==
Las Vegas Weekly writer Julie Seabaugh described the music on Controversy Loves Company as "energetic pop-punk with a dance-happy edge", with lyrical themes revolving around living on the road, teenage angst, and girls. The album was compared to the work of Fall Out Boy, Hot Rod Circuit, and Taking Back Sunday. O'Connor said he and Stevens would write lyrics first, before writing any music. O'Connor said the album's title refers to the variety of membership changes, as well as "changes and controversy that was going on in [...] and outside of the band".

The album's opening track, "Dance Halls Turn to Ghost Towns", features harmonies that recall "Dance, Dance" (2005) by Fall Out Boy. Discussing "You've Made Us Conscious", O'Connor said it was "about how we as a band don’t care who you are—you could be tall, fat, skinny, wear makeup—we don’t really care". "It's Too Late" is a power pop track that is reminiscent of the sound of Zebrahead, and its following track, "Approach the Bench", was compared to the works of Armor for Sleep. The introduction to "Don't Be So Hard" evoked the sound of Jack's Mannequin, while the rest of it was recalled of the work of the Academy Is... Its chorus section is sung as a conversation between two lovers. "Lawyers" recalled the work of Over It.

== Release ==
Following the end of recording, the Audition was need of a guitarist, and recruited Chicago native and friend Tim Klepek. The Audition appeared at The Bamboozle festival in April 2005. In July and August 2005, the band toured with the Hurt Process, Aiden and the Junior Varsity on the New Faces from Different Places tour. Controversy Loves Company was released on September 20, 2005 through Victory Records. The day after, the music video for "You've Made Us Conscious" was posted on Yahoo!'s website; O'Connor said it "makes fun of the 'scene' that’s going on today. The pants, the [stereotypical] scenester, broken heart". Shane Drake directed the video, with whom, the band liked his previous work for Fall Out Boy, Hawthorne Heights, and Paramore. The album was promoted with a handful of shows in September and October 2005 with Glasseater, Secret Lives of the Freemasons and Scary Kids Scaring Kids, and then some shows with I Am the Avalanche. Following this, they went on a cross-country US tour with Spitalfield in November and December 2005. In January 2006, the group went on tour with June, Small Towns Burn a Little Slower and Forgive Durden, before playing three shows later in the month with Ever We Fall.

The Audition embarked on a West Coast trek with Mae and Lovedrug through to March 2006, which was followed by a week-long tour with Aiden and Thirty Seconds to Mars. They then went on separate tours with Punchline and Emanuel. The Audition embarked on a stint of the UK tour surrounding their appearance at the Download Festival. They supported Thirty Seconds to Mars in the US and then appeared on the Warped Tour in July 2006. They embarked on their first headlining US tour in August 2006, with support from Just Surrender, Forgive Durden and Ivory. The Audition then went on a tour of the UK alongside other Victory acts, the Sleeping, Aiden and Bayside, in the following month. In January 2007, the band supported The Bronx on their tour of the UK. In February 2007, the band supported Jack's Mannequin on their tour of the US, which was then extended into the following month. For the remainder of March 2007, the band toured the UK with the Academy Is... In May and June, the group went on a tour across the US with My American Heart, New Atlantic and the Graduate. The group supported Boys Like Girls on their US headlining tour, dubbed Tourzilla, from late September to late November 2007.

== Reception ==
Professional ratings
Review scores
Source	Rating
AllMusic	2/5 stars
Las Vegas Weekly	2.5/5 stars
Melodic	3/5 stars
The Morning Call	3/5 stars
Ox-Fanzine	7/10
Punknews.org	2.5/5 stars
Rock Hard	7.5/10

Controversy Loves Company was met with mixed reviews from music critics. Ariana Rock of Exclaim! "catchy and fun [...] but has that devious, shifty side, just like your cousin Johnny who you always get into trouble with, and who seems to get more and more fun the longer you stick around". The staff at Curve called it a "dazzling mix of rock with a good measure of pop thrown in that had me and plenty of others completely addicted". The staff at Rock Hard wrote that the band "don't let out a hook line that couldn't be heard immediately on the radio and in the stadium" as their playing style is "extremely clean and tight". They added that the music is "performed so competently and powerfully, which creates a powerful mood beyond all categories".

Ox-Fanzine's Thomas Eberhardt was surprised that the band had an "uncanny feeling for melodic hooks" despite their young ages, adding that "nothing ripples along, riff follows riff without a breather and the rhythm is a lot more sophisticated" than their contemporaries. He noted that Naclerio's production gave "enormous pressure behind the songs". Melodic writer Kaj Roth explained that he was a "truly a sucker for energetic rock like this album," acknowledging that the band's music was "hardly groundbreaking but this 5 piece sure can write catchy songs that will make any punkpop fan stomp their feet". Punktastic founder Paul Savage wrote that it was not the "best record of the year – in places it’s a bit dull and predictable – but on the whole it’s an exciting listen with plenty of good songs".

AllMusic reviewer Johnny Loftus said the band "make all the right moves" with the album, as the tracks are "compact dynamos of emo[tional] urgency, and every single triumphant break or righteous gang vocal moment can be anticipated at least a measure before it arrives". He added, though, that there "needs to be some identity to the sound, though, and there's very little of that" on the album. Seabaugh felt that the band "breaks no new ground, but hey, if Fall Out Boy apes them (see: 'Dance, Dance'), they must be on to something". Joseph Simek of Illinois Entertainer dismissed the release, stating that the band would never "write more than what is expected or what will probably sell".

Punknews.org staff member Brian Shultz wrote that the "latest middle road example" of a band from Chicago, saying that they "separate themselves a bit with slightly more strident tempos and a vocalist who heavily resembles Over It's [vocalist] Peter Munters at certain inflections". He added that "unfortunately, it's not quite as memorable or creative despite their attempts at big choruses and soft/loud dynamics track in and out". The Morning Call contributor Tom Coombe wrote that the band should have "gone on a few more auditions before recording", adding that it was "it's too tiring, just like this album, and this band, and every other god-awful, over-serious emo-punk outfit on the planet". He mentioned that "bands like The Audition are as prevalent as androids in a sci-fi movie, only not as human".

== Track listing ==
All songs written by the Audition.

No.	Title	Length
1.	"Dance Halls Turn to Ghost Towns"	3:18
2.	"You've Made Us Conscious"	3:00
3.	"It's Too Late"	3:03
4.	"Approach the Bench"	2:49
5.	"The Ultimate Cover Up"	2:57
6.	"Don't Be So Hard"	3:14
7.	"Lawyers"	3:08
8.	"Rep Your Clique"	2:47
9.	"La Rivalita"	2:36
10.	"Smoke and Mirrors"	3:36
Total length:		30:32

== Personnel ==
Personnel per booklet.

The Audition

- Joe Lussa – bass
- Tim Klepek – guitar
- Seth Johnson – guitar
- Danny Stevens – vocals
- Ryan O'Connor – drums

Production and design

- John Naclerio – producer, mixing, mastering
- Paul Friemel – artwork, photography, design
