= Make It Blur =

Studio album by June
- Released: August 7, 2007
- Genre: Power pop
- Label: Victory

June chronology
If You Speak Any Faster (2005)	Make It Blur (2007)

Make It Blur is the second and final studio album by Chicago-based band June.

== Release ==
Professional ratings
Review scores
Source	Rating
AbsolutePunk.net	59%
Allmusic	4.5/5 stars
IGN	7.1/10
Melodic	3.5/5 stars

On June 30, 2007, Make It Blur was announced for released in two months' time. June supported Paulson on their headlining tour in June 2007, and then Boys Night Out the following month. June posted their new demo, "Sight For Sore Eyes", on their MySpace and Purevolume as a first look of the album. On July 10 they posted their new single on their MySpace, entitled "I'd Lose Myself". They have reportedly finished a video for it. In July, the band supported Boys Night Out on their tour of the U.S. Make It Blur was released on August 7, 2007 through Victory Records. On the same day, a music video was released for "I'd Lose Myself". Also in August, the group went on tour with The Higher and the Graduate, followed by a handful of shows with My American Heart. From late October to early December, the group went on the 2007 edition of the Victory Tour. In February 2008, the band announced they would be scaling back their activity.

== Track listing ==
1. "No Time for Sense
2. "Finally"
3. "Tempter"
4. "Closer"
5. "Your Shadow"
6. "I'd Lose Myself"
7. "Just Don't Let Go"
8. "Machine and the Line"
9. "Swallowed"
10. "A Taste"
11. "Sight for Sore Eyes"
12. "Southpoint"
