= Champion (The Audition album) =

Studio album by the Audition
- Released: January 22, 2008
- Genre: Pop-punk
- Length: 33:50
- Label: Victory
- Producer: John Naclerio

The Audition chronology
Controversy Loves Company (2005)	Champion (2008)	Self-titled Album (2009)

Champion is the second studio album by American rock band the Audition. It was released in the USA and the UK on January 22, 2008 by Victory Records. It has roughly sold 75,000 copies since its release in 2008.

== Background ==
The Audition released their debut studio album Controversy Loves Company in September 2005 through Victory Records. Initial promotion saw the band tour the United States with labelmates Spitalfield until the end of the year, followed by US tour with June in January 2006. By June 2006, O'Connor said they had upwards of ten potential ideas for new songs.

== Composition ==
Musically, the sound of Champion has been described as pop-punk and new wave, drawing comparison to the work of the Rx Bandits. Melodic writer Kaj Roth said: "The 2008 version of The Audition can be described as having Panic! at the Disco playing The Clash songs". The album opens with "Basbhat", a dance-influenced track. "Warm Me Up" is an up-tempo song that has verses in the style of the Cure; the pre-chorus sections recalled "Cry Me a River" (2002) by Justin Timberlake. "Edinboro" comes across as a more guitar-orientated iteration of Duran Duran and Simple Minds. "Hell to Sell" evokes the It Won't Be Soon Before Long-era (2007) Maroon 5. The ballad song "What Gets You Through the Night" that was compared to the sound of U2, and is bookended by two rock tracks, "Ether" and "Shady Business". "Make It Rain" is a dance-rock and power pop song that is followed by the album's closing song, "Have Gun, Will Travel", which was reminiscent of the work of the band's labelmates the Forecast.

== Release ==
Champion was first teased by the band at a show on November 15, 2007, follow by a formal announcement on December 19, 2007, and released on January 22, 2008. "Warm Me Up" was released as the album's lead single around this time. In January and February, the band headlined the PacTour, with support from Envy on the Coast, Danger Radio and Another Day Late. A music video was released for "Warm Me Up" on February 6, 2008; it was filmed in Cleveland, Ohio in November 2007. Later in February 2008, an alternative version of the video was released, mixing in footage of the game Obscure: The Aftermath (2007), directed by Don Tyler. Following this, the band went on tour of the UK alongside You Me at Six.

Following appearances at the South by Southwest and South by So What?! festivals, the Audition headlined the Spring Break 08 tour in the US from mid-March until early May, with support from Hit the Lights, Every Avenue, the Morning Light and Kiros. In the midst of this, the band appeared at the Bamboozle Left festival, and later performed at the Give it a Name festival in the UK. After this, the band participated in Warped Tour from late June until mid-August.

== Reception ==
Professional ratings
Review scores
Source	Rating
AbsolutePunk	73%
AllMusic	3.5/5 stars
Alternative Press	4/5 stars
Melodic	3.5/5 stars
Ox-Fanzine	9/10

Champion was met with mixed reviews from music critics. AbsolutePunk staff writer Drew Beringer felt that despite the album being "rather short", it "hits you hard and hits you fast". He noted that most of the songs "don’t follow the same path set forward on Controversy, rather going in direction that can span more genres". Ox-Fanzine reviewer Arne Koepke found that the band wrote "catchy verses and pleasing refrains en masse ready for us". Roth wrote that it "pleases me to say that there's less pop/punk on the new album and more of that dance-able new wave" as the tracks "will get you in a good friday night mood".

Exclaim! writer Sari Delmar said that while the band "refined their sugar-coated vocals and stepped it up to a whole new level of poppy-ness, they seem to have toned down the originality". The staff at Curve countered this, saying it "wasn’t a total write off though and a few songs on this album did show evidence of their earlier panache". Punktastic founder Paul Savage wrote that it was not a "bad record per se, it’s slower in pace and certainly less moody than its predecessor [...] You can’t mock or upset a band for wanting to go down that route, but I just feel The Audition were better with that 'oomph'". AllMusic reviewer Jason MacNeil wrote that after the first two tracks, the album "begins to slide down a slippery slope" in terms of quality. He summarised it as a "rather uneven affair" as the band "pass the audition, but not with flying colors".

== Track listing ==
No.	Title	Length
1.	"Basbhat"	2:42
2.	"Warm Me Up"	3:32
3.	"Heaven for the Weather"	3:09
4.	"Edinboro"	3:11
5.	"Hell to Sell"	3:48
6.	"Ether"	3:50
7.	"What Gets You Through the Night"	4:24
8.	"Shady Business"	3:21
9.	"Make It Rain"	3:10
10.	"Have Gun, Will Travel"	3:05
Total length:		33:50

== Personnel ==
The Audition

- Danny Stevens - Lead Vocals, Piano on "What Gets You Through The Night"
- Seth Johnson - Lead Guitar (Guitar Solo on "Warm Me Up" and "Have Gun, Will Travel"), Acoustic Guitar, Backing Vocals
- Tim Klepek - Rhythm Guitar
- Joe Lussa - Bass Guitar
- Ryan O'Connor - Drums, Percussion

Production and design

- John Naclerio - Mastering, Mixing, Producer
- Paul Carabello - Engineer
- Nigel Evan Dennis - Art Direction, Illustrations, Layout Design
- Ryan Bakerink - Photography
