= In the Shadow of Two Gunmen =

In the Shadow of Two Gunmen may refer to:

- "In the Shadow of Two Gunmen", a 2000 episode of the American serial political drama television series The West Wing
- In the Shadow of Two Gunmen, a 2006 album by indie rock band The Forecast
