= Steve Bryant =

Steve Bryant may refer to:

- Steve Bryant (American football) (born 1959), American football wide receiver
- Steve Bryant (English footballer) (born 1953), English footballer
- Steven Bryant (composer) (born 1972), American composer and conductor
- Steven Matt Bryant (born 1975), American football placekicker

== See also ==
- Stephen Bryant, English violinist
