= Fading Days =

EP by Amber Pacific
- Released: May 25, 2004
- Studio: Jupiter Studios, Seattle, WA
- Genre: Emo, pop punk
- Length: 17:57
- Label: Hopeless
- Producer: Martin Feveyear

Amber Pacific chronology
Fading Days (2004)	Fading Days (2004)	The Possibility and the Promise (2005)

Professional ratings
Review scores
Source	Rating
AllMusic	3/5 stars

Fading Days is the debut EP from pop-punk band Amber Pacific. The EP's title is mentioned in the song Everything We Were Has Become What We Are ("This is the last chapter of our fading days"), from Amber Pacific's album The Possibility and the Promise. Always You was later rerecorded and used on their debut album. The song "Always You" was featured on the soundtrack of the game Burnout 3: Takedown.

== Track listing ==
All music is composed by Will Nutter.

No.	Title	Lyrics	Length
1.	"Thoughts Before Me"	Blake Evans	3:58
2.	"Always You"	Will Nutter	4:06
3.	"The Last Time"	Will Nutter	3:53
4.	"Letters of Regret"	Will Nutter	1:41
5.	"Here We Stand"	Blake Evans	4:18
Total length:			17:57
