= Self-titled Album (The Audition album) =

Self-Titled Album

Studio album by the Audition
- Released: April 28, 2009
- Recorded: December 2008 – February 2009
- Genre: Pop-punk; new wave
- Length: 32:05
- Label: Victory
- Producer: Mark Trombino

The Audition chronology
| Champion (2008) | Self-Titled Album (2009) | Great Danger (2010) |

Self-titled Album is the third studio album by American rock band the Audition. It was produced by Mark Trombino, who has previously worked with Jimmy Eat World, Senses Fail, Blink-182 and Finch, amongst others. This is the first release since the departure of original bassist and founding member Joe Lussa (Joe did record all bass parts on all 10 songs).

== Background and recording ==
In December 2008, the band supported All Time Low on their Christma-Hanu-Kwanza tour in the US. While on the tour, the band were writing and recording their next album. The band initially planned to work with Sum 41 vocalist/guitarist Deryck Whibley as their producer. Drummer Ryan O'Connor said they "hit it off instantly, he has a totally different outlook than any other producer we have worked with, he is really all about song writing and making sure all the songs are ready". However, on January 5, 2009, it was announced that the group would not be working with Whibley, as O'Connor explains: "Things didn't work out and it's not going to happen. ... BUT, we are in the studio with another producer who we couldn't be more excited to be working with!" In addition, it was mentioned that drum tracking had started that day. Recording continued into February 2009 while on a UK tour, as Stevens explained: "We did not finish our third record with the studio time we had [...] I actually recorded vocal harmonies in the back of our van after we played in Manchester".

== Composition ==
Self-titled Album has been compared to Walk This Way (2008) by the White Tie Affair. Melodic writer Kaj Roth said it combined the sound of their first two albums: "33% pop/punk, 33% new wave and fill out the rest with guitar driven modern rock". Punktastic founder Paul Savage compared it to the sound of the Higher, saying that it had a "good time party vibe going on, minus The Higher's over-use of electronics and samples". "Stand on Your Feet" evoked the work of Jimmy Eat World, and is followed by the power ballad "It's Gonna Be Hard (When I'm Gone)".

== Release ==
On January 28, 2009, it was announced that bassist Joe Lussa had left the band. In February, the band went on a tour of Europe with Alkaline Trio. On February 24, the album's artwork and title, Self-Titled Album, was revealed. Following this, the band toured Australia as part of the Soundwave festival in February and March. On April 16, the album was made available for streaming. In April, the band supported Kevin Rudolf on his Let It Rock Tour. Though the tour was intended to run into May, the band dropped off the tour on April 19. After being initially scheduled for on March 31, the Self-titled Album was eventually released on April 28 through Victory Records. In late April and early May, the band went on a UK tour with Madina Lake.

On May 5, a music video was released for "My Temperature's Rising". Through to the end of the month, the group went on tour with Forever the Sickest Kids. In early-to-mid June, the band went on the Happiness Tour alongside Dance Gavin Dance, Closure in Moscow and Endless Hallway. Following this, the band played three headlining shows, before embarking on The Audition for The Higher Tour from late June to mid-July. The tour was co-headlined with the Higher. Closure in Moscow, Runner Runner, In:Aviate and the Hoodies featured on select dates. Around this time, "My Temperature Is Rising" was released to radio stations. In September and October, the band supported All Time Low on their European tour.

== Reception ==
Professional ratings
Review scores
| Source | Rating |
|---|---|
| Melodic | 3.5/5 stars |
| Ox-Fanzine | 3.5/5 stars |

Ox-Fanzine writer David Schumann referred to the album as their "best release to date", highlighting that the "songwriting has been improved again". AllMusic reviewer Kenneth Herzog wrote that it "displays an agile duplicity, straddling the smoothness of commercial dance music and the bite of distorted riffing". Roth said the "songs are damn catchy and Butch [Walker]'s spirit lies heavy on some of the tracks for sure".

The staff at Curve said they would not "define [the songs] as bad. They just feel reminiscent of their previous album" as the tracks were indistinct from one another. They acknowledge that while it is "good sometimes for lyrics to be uncomplicated but I just found this album really lacked any depth". Savage saw it as an improvement over their second album, though when they "slow things down the band sound as average as something exceedingly average".

== Track listing ==
| No. | Title | Length |
|---|---|---|
| 1. | "The Running Man" | 3:27 |
| 2. | "The Way You Move" | 2:47 |
| 3. | "My Temperature's Rising" | 3:00 |
| 4. | "Love with a Motive" | 2:57 |
| 5. | "Stand on Your Feet" | 3:19 |
| 6. | "It's Gonna Be Hard (When I'm Gone)" | 4:07 |
| 7. | "Over My Head" | 3:10 |
| 8. | "Los Angeles" | 3:25 |
| 9. | "Everybody Is Someone Else's Secret" | 2:47 |
| 10. | "Sign. Steal. Deliver" | 3:12 |
| Total length: | | 32:05 |

== Personnel ==
The Audition

- Danny Stevens - Vocals, Harmony
- Seth Johnson - Lead Guitar, Acoustic Guitar, Programming, Synthesizer
- Tim Klepek - Rhythm Guitar
- Joe Lussa - Bass Guitar
- Ryan O'Connor - Drums, percussion

Production

- Mark Trombino - Audio Engineer, Audio Production, Engineer, Mixing, Producer
- Carlos de la Garza - Audio Engineer, Engineer
- Alan Douches - Mastering
- Mike Rose - Drum Technician

Artwork

- Mark Capicotto - Cover Art
- Ian Arnold - Photography

== Videos ==
- "My Temperature's Rising"
- "The Way You Move"
