= The Possibility and the Promise =

Studio album by Amber Pacific
- Released: May 24, 2005
- Studio: Jupiter Studios, Seattle, Washington
- Genre: Emo, pop punk
- Length: 40:58
- Label: Hopeless
- Producer: Martin Feveyear

Amber Pacific chronology
Fading Days (2004)	The Possibility and the Promise (2005)	Truth in Sincerity (2007)

Professional ratings
Review scores
Source	Rating
Allmusic	3.5/5 stars
IGN	(4.2/10)
Jesus Freak Hideout	2/5 stars
Punknews.org	1.5/5 stars

The Possibility and the Promise is the first full-length album released by the emo band Amber Pacific. The title was taken from a quote in Charles Bukowski's Ham on Rye. The album contains one previously heard track, which is "Always You (Good Times)", which can be heard on the band's debut EP.

== Track listing ==
All tracks are written by William Nutter, except where noted.

No.	Title	Length
1.	"Everything We Were Has Become What We Are"	2:59
2.	"Poetically Pathetic" (lyrics by Greg Strong)	3:22
3.	"Gone So Young" (lyrics by Strong)	3:25
4.	"Save Me from Me"	2:48
5.	"Postcards" (lyrics by Nutter, Strong)	3:11
6.	"For What It's Worth"	3:34
7.	"The Right to Write Me Off"	3:19
8.	"The Sky Could Fall Tonight"	3:41
9.	"Falling Away"	3:01
10.	"Always You (Good Times)" (lyrics by Strong)	4:09
11.	"If I Fall"	3:56
12.	"Can't Hold Back"	3:34
Total length:		40:58

=== Deluxe Edition ===
In addition to the above songs, the Deluxe Edition contained the following songs:

No.	Title	Length
1.	"Leaving What You Wanted"	3:39
2.	"Falling Away" (Demo)	2:59
3.	"Gone So Young" (Acoustic)	3:42
4.	"Poetically Pathetic" (Acoustic)	3:15
5.	"Save Me from Me" (Acoustic)	3:13
6.	"For What It's Worth" (Acoustic)	3:34
7.	"Always You" (Acoustic)	4:14

== Personnel ==
=== Amber Pacific ===
- Matt Young – vocals
- Will Nutter – guitar, backup vocals, piano, keyboard
- Greg Strong – bass
- Justin Westcott – guitar, backup vocals
- Dango – drums

=== Additional musicians ===
- Christine Dunaway – violin, viola (on "Everything We Were Has Become What We Are" and "For What It's Worth")
- Douglas Aaron Nation – cello (on "Everything We Were Has Become What We Are" and "For What It's Worth")
- Davy Rispoli – backup vocals
