= Truth in Sincerity =

Studio album by Amber Pacific
- Released: May 22, 2007
- Studios: Jupiter Studios, Seattle, Washington
- Genres: Pop punk, emo
- Label: Hopeless
- Producer: Martin Feveyear

Amber Pacific chronology
The Possibility and the Promise (2005)	Truth in Sincerity (2007)	Virtues (2010)

Professional ratings
Review scores
Source	Rating
AbsolutePunk.net	7.3/10
AllMusic	3/5 stars
NeuFutur	10/10

Truth in Sincerity is the second full-length album by the pop punk band Amber Pacific and was one of the most anticipated pop punk albums of 2007. It was released on May 22, 2007. The first singles from the album were "Fall Back Into My Life" and "You're Only Young Once." Will Nutter has stated that "Follow Your Dreams, Forget The Scene" was made to a special fan of the band. The song "Runaway" features vocals from Mike Herrera of MxPx. On May 16, 2007, the entire album was available to stream on Amber Pacific's MySpace profile.

The album sold around 10,000 copies in its first week in America and debuted at number 64 on the Billboard 200. It has now sold a total of 35,000 copies in the US.

== Track listing ==
No.	Title	Length
1.	"Rule #76"	0:50
2.	"Summer (In B)"	3:35
3.	"Temporary"	2:28
4.	"You're Only Young Once"	3:30
5.	"Living Proof"	3:14
6.	"Follow Your Dreams, Forget the Scene"	3:36
7.	"Take Me from This Place"	4:07
8.	"Fall Back Into My Life"	3:29
9.	"We Think We're Hardcore, 'Cause Well, We Are"	0:45
10.	"Runaway" (Featuring Mike Herrera of MxPx)	3:15
11.	"Watching Over Me"	3:48
12.	"Dear ____, This Has Always Been About Standing Up for What You Believe In..."	6:02

iTunes exclusive Bonus Tracks
No.	Title	Length
13.	"Always You (Good times)" (Acoustic)
14.	"For What It's Worth" (Acoustic)

== Production ==
- Stephen Bryant — violin
- Sue Jane Bryant — viola
- Walter Gray — cello
- Rick Hanson — electric guitar
- Will Nutter — electric guitar/backup vocals/piano
- Dango — drums
- Greg Strong — bass guitar
- Matt Young — lead vocals
- Davy Rispoli — additional back-up vocals

Personnel:

- William "Billy" Brown, David Dressel — engineers
- Martin Feveyear — producer, engineer, mixing
- Vlado Meller — mastering

== Charts ==
Chart (2007)	Peak position
US Billboard 200	64
US Independent Albums (Billboard)	4
US Top Rock Albums (Billboard)	19
