= Texas (PlayRadioPlay! album) =

Studio album by PlayRadioPlay!
- Released: March 18, 2008
- Genre: Electronic/Pop
- Length: 49:19
- Label: Island
- Producer: Jacknife Lee, Lester Mendez, Daniel Hunter

PlayRadioPlay! chronology
The Frequency E.P. (2007)	Texas (2008)	Ancient Electrons (2009)

Professional ratings
Review scores
Source	Rating
AbsolutePunk.net	90% link
The Album Project	link
Allmusic	link
Fort Worth Star-Telegram	link

Texas is the first full-length album by PlayRadioPlay!.

== Track listing ==
1. "Loco Commotion" – 4:12
  - 1.5. "Suddenly, I've Become a Perfectionist" – 0:11
2. "I'm a Pirate, You're a Princess" – 4:08
  - 2.5. "A Special Thanks to Dr. Allan C. Lloyd" - 1:01
3. "Some Crap About the Furniture" – 3:30
  - 3.5. "Invisible Suits and Ties" – 1:42
4. "Madi Don't Leave" – 4:51
  - 4.5. "For the Whole World/Room to See" – 0:48
5. "Without Gravity" – 4:03
6. "See You Soon" – 4:01
7. "I'm Afraid There's a Hole in My Brain" – 3:47
  - 7.5. "Taxes" – 0:15
8. "More of the Worst" – 3:25
  - 8.5. "Lady Killers Wear Funny Hats" – 1:28
9. "My Attendance Is Bad But My Intentions Are Good" – 3:01
  - 9.5. "Cheap Paper With Full Color Advertisements" – 1:32
10. "Corner Office Bedroom" – 3:22
  - 10.5. "Why Is Everyone Running?" – 0:48
11. "Forgiveness, The Enviable Trait" – 2:21
12. "Texas" – 0:59
13. "Elephants as Big as Whales" - 5:38 (iTunes Bonus Track)
- Songs listed with a .5 are segues, preludes, and/or interludes that act as transitions between songs. It was a way to have the record label allow the band to have 20 songs on a debut release.

== Charts ==
Chart (2008)	Peak position
U.S. Billboard 200	157
U.S. Billboard Heatseeker Albums	4
