= The Junior Varsity =

US musical group

- Origin: Normal, Illinois, U.S.
- Genres: Emo, alternative rock
- Years active: 2002–2007, 2010, 2016, 2022-2023
- Labels: Victory Records; British Records
- Past members: Andy Wildrick; Asa Dawson; Sergio Coronado; Chris Birch; Nick Dodson; Noah Wenger; Brandon Carnes (Fill in Vocals/Bass); Tony Peck; David Bradbury

The Junior Varsity is an American emo alternative rock band from Central Illinois.

== Biography ==
Formed in 2002 by current guitarist Andy Wildrick, the band succeeded another local band called Winner Takes All; several songs written during that time were later recorded as Junior Varsity songs. The Junior Varsity self-released a six-song EP in 2002, with Noah Wenger taking lead vocals. A series of changes since has led to the band's line-up of Asa Dawson on bass guitar and vocals, Andy Wildrick on lead guitar, Sergio Coronado on rhythm guitar, Chris Birch on drums, and Nick Dodson on keyboards. Their first full-length, The Great Compromise, was released on British Records in 2004 while the band's members were still in college, and was warmly received by critics. The next year, the band recorded a cover of the song "Raining in Baltimore" for a Counting Crows tribute album, Dead and Dreaming, which was populated by a number of then-up-and-coming independent bands.

After frequent touring in the Chicago area, their energetic live shows led to their signing with a leading Chicago-based independent label, Victory Records, in 2004. Their album, Wide Eyed, produced by Matt Squire, was released in July 2005 on Victory, and the band participated on the Warped Tour in both 2005 and 2006 while touring in support of the album. They have also opened nationally for a number of well-known emo and punk acts, including Fall Out Boy, Gym Class Heroes, Rise Against, Straylight Run, The Starting Line, Motion City Soundtrack, TheAUDITION, Bayside, Sullivan, Number One Gun, Aiden, Amber Pacific, and Good Charlotte. Early in 2006, they toured in the UK, supporting The Academy Is... and Panic! at the Disco at sold-out shows; UK rock magazines, including Kerrang! and Rock Sound, reviewed the band's albums favorably. The lead single from Wide Eyed, "Get Comfortable", has received some airplay; the video for "Get Comfortable" was aired on MTV2 in 2006 and was also included on a free video sampler DVD received when purchasing certain albums from Victory Records artists. Victory re-released The Great Compromise in 2006 with additional demo tracks and a DVD bonus disc. Additionally, the band was named SPIN Band of the Day on July 26, 2005. They had music featured on video games MVP 06: NCAA Baseball, as well as Amped 3 for Xbox 360.

The Junior Varsity finished recording their third LP at the conclusion of their December 2006 tour with labelmates Bayside. This album, entitled Cinematographic, was released by Victory Records on June 19, 2007. The song "The Sky!" was released on "Oven Fresh" on Fuse from their latest effort called Cinematographic.

The stop motion animation music video for "The Sky!" was created by the company that animated and produced Robot Chicken on Adult Swim of Cartoon Network. It featured a man in a house that was falling through the sky going through the motions of life. While a cloud version of the band hypnotized him from the outside finally lured him out into the tumbling abyss as he became one of them.

In August 2007, they were set to tour with Permanent Me and Scenes from a Movie. Soon before the tour started, rumors about Asa Dawson leaving the band were confirmed, and The Junior Varsity left the tour. The JV did play a show at the Rock n Roll Hall of Fame without Dawson. The vocalist/bass player at this show was Brandon Carnes who used to be the frontman for Midnight Fall, a band from Springfield, Illinois. On October 21, 2007, Andy Wildrick announced that the group would be going on indefinite hiatus, and that the band members would be going to college but may do occasional one-off shows locally in Illinois. On December 28, The Junior Varsity had their official farewell show at Club Chrome in Springfield, Illinois, with opening bands The Graduate, Wise & Burn, and Greenwood. The full lineup performed that evening for the first time since Summerfest.

Andy Wildrick went on to tour with The Dear Hunter for several years and then went on to tour with David Cook, winner of American Idol Season 7.

== Recent news ==
On July 30, 2010, The JV played a reunion show in Springfield, Illinois, at the Dublin Pub. The band Park also reunited at that show. The next day, Nick Dodson sent a Facebook message to many of the people who attended the show thanking the fans. He also said to keep an eye out for more shows in the winter.

In the summer of 2016, the band planned The Junior Varsity 2016 Reunion Tour, a short four-city tour for September, 2016. The initial show was in Bloomington, Illinois, on September 1, 2016, and the tour also included dates in Chicago, Springfield, and St. Louis.

In the summer of 2022, TJV sold out a show in Bloomington, Illinois at music venue nightshop and the next night headlined Downhome music festival in Springfield, Illinois.

== Members ==
- Asa Dawson: Bass, Vocals
- Andy Wildrick: Lead Guitar
- Sergio Coronado: Rhythm Guitar
- Chris Birch: Percussion
- Nick Dodson: Keyboard, Saxophone, Vocals
- Brandon Carnes: Bass, Vocals
- David Bradbury: Bass
- Noah Wenger: Vocals
- Tony Peck: Drums

== Discography ==
- The Junior Varsity (Self-release, 2002) - EP
- The Great Compromise (British Records, 2003) - LP
- Dead and Dreaming: An Indie Tribute to Counting Crows (Victory / The Vinyl Summer Records, 2004) - "Raining In Baltimore"
- Wide Eyed (Victory Records, 2005) - LP
- The Great Compromise re-release (Victory Records, 2006) - LP with bonus DVD
- Cinematographic (Victory Records, 2007) - LP
- Anxiety (Self-release, 2025) - Single
- Guilt (Self-release, 2025) - Single
