= Tony Peck =

American drummer (born 1983)

Tony Peck (born September 5, 1983 in Louisiana, Missouri) is the drummer for Peoria, Illinois based band, The Forecast. He was raised in Pleasant Hill, Illinois and is a 2002 graduate of Pleasant Hill High School where he was active in the school's music programs and was a 2002 recipient of the Arion Award. After graduating from high school he began touring and recording with several bands, including The Junior Varsity, for two years before being asked to join The Forecast in July 2004.

Tony uses C&C drums and Sabian cymbals.
