= Anhedonia (The Graduate album) =

Studio album by The Graduate
- Released: April 10, 2007
- Genre: Indie Rock
- Length: 41:57
- Label: Icon MES
- Producer: Brian McTernan

The Graduate chronology
Horror Show EP (2006)	Anhedonia (2007)	Only Every Time (2010)

Professional ratings
Review scores
Source	Rating
Allmusic	3/5 stars
AbsolutePunk.net	(86%)

Anhedonia is the debut album by American rock band The Graduate. The tracks "Sit & Sink" and "Justified" were featured on their previous Horror Show EP and were re-recorded for this album. The album title is a reference to Anhedonia, the psychological condition of being unable to feel joy or excitement from normally pleasurable acts, such as social or sexual interactions.

== Track listing ==
All tracks written by The Graduate.

1. "Sit & Sink" – 3:47
2. "I Survived" – 2:31
3. "Bet It All" – 3:03
4. "Anhedonia" – 3:32
5. "The City That Reads" – 4:23
6. "Better Company" – 3:23
7. "Surround Yourself" – 4:20
8. "Interlude" – 2:24
9. "Doppelgänger" – 3:25
10. "Stay the Same" – 3:20
11. "Justified" – 2:27
12. "Sing" – 5:22

== Singles ==
- The band has released "Sit & Sink" as a single, where it has found moderate success, especially on college radio stations. To help promote the single, a music video was also released, consisting mostly of a performance by the band in a large abandoned police station.
- "Anhedonia" is the second single from the album. The music video consists of the band performing in a small, dark area. Corey Warning is shown with water streaming down his face in intermittent close-ups.

== Personnel ==
- Corey Warning – vocals
- Matt Kennedy – guitar, keyboard, vocals
- Max Sauer – guitar, vocals
- Jared Wuestenberg – bass
- Tim Moore – drums, vibraphone, keyboard, vocals
- Heather Stebbins – cello
- Brian McTernan – record producer, engineering, mixer
- George Marino – mastering
- Danny Jones – artwork
