= Scenes from a Movie =

- Origin: Charleston, West Virginia, U.S.
- Genres: Pop punk
- Labels: One Big Spark/ EastWest Records
- Website: scenesfromamovie.com

Scenes from a Movie is an American band from Charleston, West Virginia.

== History ==
Scenes from a Movie members Tony Bush and Jon Ewing were friends in high school. Ewing went on to the University of Charleston while Bush went to college at Bowling Green State University. Ewing, and the guitarist Luke Del Papa, convinced Bush to leave university and the group expanded to a quintet, choosing the name Scenes from a Movie. Adding Jared Miller on drums and Adam Triplett on bass guitar, the group started touring, soon appearing with groups such as The Starting Line, Thursday and Boys Like Girls. They signed to an East West Records subsidiary, One Big Spark, in 2006, and continued touring, playing at Warped Tour 2007 and then opening for Permanent ME and The Junior Varsity. Their first LP, The Pulse, was released on July 24, 2007, and was compared to Fall Out Boy and Panic! at the Disco. They were named Spin magazine's Band of the Day on September 14, 2007.

On October 2, 2007, Bush and Triplett announced their departure from the band which later split up.

== Members ==
- Tony Bush - vocals
- Jon Ewing - guitar
- Luke Del Papa - guitar
- Adam Triplett - bass guitar
- Jared Miller - oboe
- Logan Mace - vocals (filled in after Bush left the band in 2007)
- Aaron "Squared" Edwards - bass guitar (filled in after Triplett left the band in 2007)
- Greg McGowan - bass guitar (played for a while in 2005-2006 before Triplett joined the band)

== Discography ==
- Take Hands, Take Hearts, Take Aim (EP, 2005)
1. Crash and Learn
2. You Make This an Art
3. Speaking Of
4. Set Fire
5. Beautiful
- The Pulse (One Big Spark/EastWest Records, 2007)
1. Just Ask Us
2. Save You
3. Irukandji
4. Heartbeat From Hell
5. If I Die
6. Hang Your Halo
7. Detective, Detective
8. The Cover Up
9. If It’s My Game I Can’t Lose
10. Heads Or Tails
11. Goodbye Reckless
