= The Frequency E.P. =

The Frequency

EP by PlayRadioPlay!
- Released: April 27, 2007
- Recorded: The Bat Cave
- Genre: Electronic/Pop
- Length: 23:10
- Label: Island/Stolen Transmission
- Producer: Daniel Hunter

PlayRadioPlay! chronology
The Frequency (2007)	Texas (2008)

The Frequency E.P. is an extended play album by PlayRadioPlay!. It debuted to the public on April 27, 2007 and at number 6 on Billboard's Electronic chart.

== Track listing ==
1. "Bad Cops Bad Charities" – 4:15
2. "Complement Each Other Like Colors" – 3:57
3. "Confines of Gravity" – 2:49
4. "At This Particular Moment in Time" – 4:05
5. "Even Fairy Tale Characters Would Be Jealous" – 2:52
6. "Mr. Brightside" (cover of The Killers' song) – 5:11

== Enhanced CD ==
The Frequency E.P. features a studio recording of PlayRadioPlay! performing "Madi's Birthday Song" or "Happy Birthday Madi" live from his home studio or "The Bat Cave".
