= Amber Pacific =

American pop punk band

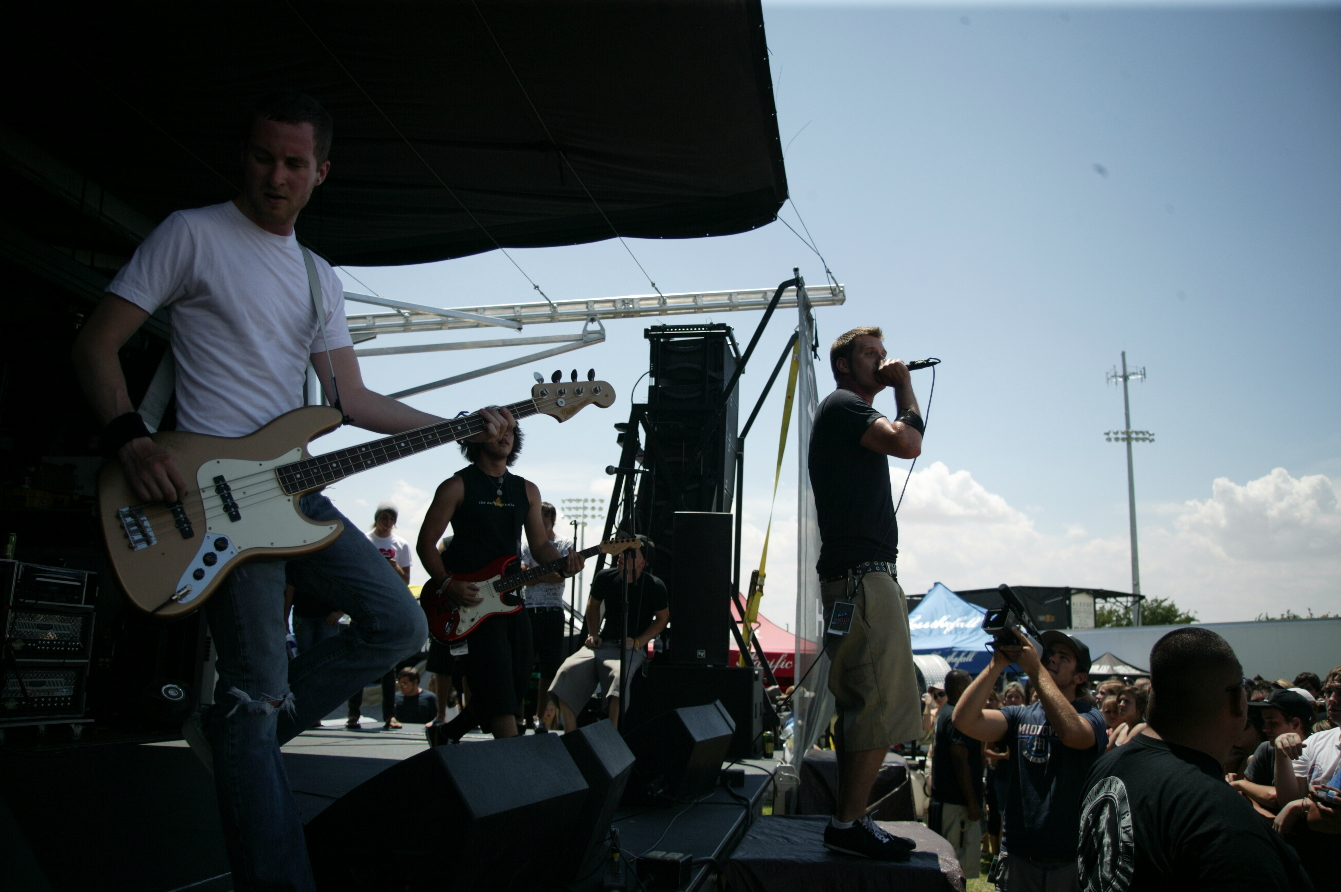
- Amber Pacific at Warped Tour, July 12, 2007 (from left to right: Greg Strong, Will Nutter, Matt Young)

Background information
- Also known as: Follow Through
- Origin: Federal Way, Washington, United States
- Genres: Emo; pop-punk
- Years active: 2002–present
- Labels: Hopeless; Victory; Digitally Sound; Straight 8 Entertainment; Manic Kat
- Members: Matt Young; Will Nutter; Dango Cellan; Justin Westcott; Brad Torkelson
- Past members: Greg Strong; Jesse Cottam; Davy Rispoli; Rick Hanson; Ben Harper; Tyler Peerson; Blake Evans
- Website: www.amberpacific.com

Amber Pacific is an American pop-punk band that formed in 2002 in Federal Way, Washington. The band has released five full-length albums, The Possibility and the Promise in 2005, Truth in Sincerity in 2007, Virtues in 2010, The Turn in 2014, and All In in 2025.

== History ==
=== Formation and first releases ===
Amber Pacific began as a group of high school juniors that performed locally in their hometown near Seattle, under the name Follow Through. The band consisted of Will Nutter, Tyler Peerson, and Blake Evans. In late 2002, vocalist Matt Young also joined the band with Justin Westcott. In the summer of 2003, Peerson and Evans left the band to pursue other interests and were replaced by Greg Strong and Josh "Dango" Cellan. In 2004, after changing their name to Amber Pacific, the band released their first EP Fading Days under Hopeless Records. In 2005, the band released their debut album, The Possibility and the Promise, still under Hopeless Records. In 2006, Justin Westcott left the band.

Ben Harper (originally in Yellowcard) joined Amber Pacific before the recording of their second studio album, Truth in Sincerity. Recording started in October 2006, but Harper left the band before the end of the year to be replaced by Rick Hanson.

=== New vocalist and third release ===
In February 2008, the band left Hopeless Records. Lead vocalist Matt Young and Rick Hanson also left Amber Pacific. Young left to pursue a career in public education as a principal, in "hopes that [he] can better prepare future generations for what lies ahead." The band has since found a new vocalist, Jesse Cottam. Cottam was formerly the lead vocalist of the Canadian band Seven's Angel, as well as a contestant on Canadian Idol. Guitarist/singer Davy Rispoli, a frequent touring member, was officially announced to have joined the band along with Cottam in the band's video blog (MySpace).

On January 27, 2009, the band signed for Victory. The band then uploaded three new songs to their official MySpace page, featuring Jesse Cottam as their new singer. They later released a self-titled digital EP on iTunes featuring the three songs on February 25.

=== Return of Matt Young and lineup changes ===
On February 9, 2011, Amber Pacific left Victory. On their Facebook page it was announced that Cottam and Rispoli had left as it was costing too much for Cottam to come down from Canada, and that Matt Young had rejoined Amber Pacific. The band planned a series of acoustic performances and guitarist Will Nutter stated he'd been writing songs in the same vein as the band's first record. On February 15, 2011, Greg Strong announced on the band's Facebook page that he was no longer in the band. Days later, guitarist and chief songwriter Will Nutter confirmed on Facebook that Strong's departure was because of Matt Young's return.

Justin Westcott also rejoined the band in 2011. The band announced that Mike Herrera of MxPx would be playing bass on their fourth studio album, The Turn. The band also raised money on indiegogo to fund the album. The band announced that they will initially release the album on July 29, 2014 in online platforms. After signing with Digitally Sound Records and Straight 8 Entertainment, the album was released worldwide on September 2, 2014.

== Musical style ==
Amber Pacific's style is emo. Kerrang! described them as a "Myspace band". AllMusic described the sound as "urgent [and] slick" pop-punk and compared it to Story of the Year, the Audition, and the All-American Rejects.

== Members ==
Current lineup

- Matt Young – lead vocals (2002–2008, 2011–present)
- Will Nutter – lead guitar, backing vocals, keyboards (2002–present)
- Dango Cellan – drums (2003–present)
- Justin Westcott – rhythm guitar, backing vocals (2002–2006, 2011–present)
- Brad Torkelson – bass guitar (2019–present)

Former

- Greg Strong – bass guitar (2003–2011)
- Jesse Cottam – lead vocals (2008–2011)
- Davy Rispoli – rhythm guitar, backing vocals (2008–2011, touring 2003–2008)
- Rick Hanson – rhythm guitar (2007–2008)
- Ben Harper – guitars (2006)
- Tyler Peerson – bass guitar (2002–2003)
- Blake Evans – drums (2002–2003)

Touring, studio, live and session

- Jeremy Gibbons – bass guitar (2011)
- Mike Herrera – bass guitar (2014)
- Bradly Miranda – guitars, bass guitar (2022–present)

== Discography ==
=== Albums ===
- The Possibility and the Promise (May 24, 2005) (U.S. 70,000+)
- Truth in Sincerity (May 22, 2007) US Billboard 200 peak No. 64
- Virtues (April 13, 2010)
- The Turn (September 2, 2014)
- All In (February 14, 2025)

=== EPs ===
- Fading Days (2004)
- Acoustic Sessions (2006)
- Acoustic Connect Sets (2008)
- Amber Pacific (2009)

=== Compilations ===
- Vans Warped Tour 2004 (Disc 2, Track 24 - Thoughts Before Me)
- Vans Warped Tour 2005 (Disc 1, Track 14 - "Gone So Young")
- Vans Warped Tour 2007 (Disc 1, Track 13 - "Summer (In B)")
- Punk Goes 80's (Track 15 - "Video Killed the Radio Star")
- Hopelessly Devoted to You Vol. 5 (Disc 1, Track 2 - "Always You"; Track 10 - "Leaving What You Wanted")
- Hopelessly Devoted to You Vol. 6 (Disc 1, Track 1 - "Gone So Young"; Track 14 - "Poetically Pathetic" (Acoustic);Disc 2, Track 21 - "Always You")
- Take Action! Volume 5 (Disc 1, Track 7 - "Poetically Pathetic")
- Punk Rock Halloween, Vol. 2: Louder, Faster & Scarier (Disc 1, Track 8 - Calling All the Monsters, a China Anne McClain cover)

=== Soundtracks ===
- Burnout 3: Takedown Soundtrack - "Always You (Good Times)"
- Flicka TV Spot - "Gone So Young"
- TMNT (2007 film) Soundtrack - "Fall Back Into My Life"
- Piranha 3DD Soundtrack - "The Good Life"
