= Only Every Time =

Studio album by The Graduate
- Released: August 31, 2010
- Genre: Indie Rock
- Length: 41:26
- Label: Razor & Tie
- Producer: Brian McTernan

The Graduate chronology
Anhedonia (2007)	Only Every Time (2010)

Professional ratings
Review scores
Source	Rating
AbsolutePunk.net	92% link
Alternative Press	link
The Album Project	link
ReviewRinseRepeat	link
Sputnik Music	link

Only Every Time is the second and final album from American rock band The Graduate. It was released on August 31, 2010.

== Track listing ==
1. "Don't Die Digging" – 3:56
2. "Sirens" – 3:25
3. "Stuck (Inside My Head)" – 4:11
4. "Make Believe" – 3:16
5. "Pull Me In" – 4:36
6. "Choke" – 3:21
7. "Halfway There" – 3:56
8. "Permanent Tourists" – 4:18
9. "All At Once" – 3:43
10. "End of the World Delight" – 4:00
11. "For the Missing" – 2:44
12. "Into the Blue" (iTunes Bonus Track) – 3:02

== Personnel ==
- Corey Warning – vocals
- Matt Kennedy – guitar, keyboard, vocals
- Max Sauer – guitar, vocals
- Jared Wuestenberg – bass
- Tim Moore – drums
- Brian McTernan – record producer
