= Veracity (album) =

Studio album by Evacuate Chicago
- Released: May 8, 2008
- Recorded: 2004 – May 2008
- Studio: Toxic Recording
- Genre: Metalcore, alternative rock, experimental rock
- Length: 41:03
- Label: Rock Ridge Music
- Producer: Alex Preiss, Josh Key

Professional ratings
Review scores
Source	Rating
CWG Magazine	2/4 stars

Veracity is the only studio album released by Evacuate Chicago, the serious persona of comedy metal band Psychostick. The album features Psychostick's brand of metal/hardcore without their usual humor, and instead a much more serious tone.

On September 17, 2009, Preiss announced on the band's MySpace that the album would be released January 12, 2010 through Rock Ridge Music. It was later changed to January 26.

== History ==
The album has been in the works since 2004, and was originally planned to be called The Damage Has Been Done. The band recorded a demo of "Deny" in 2004 that was available for play on the band's various websites. Drummer Alex Preiss told Songfacts that it was the first song he ever wrote.

In an interview with The Metal Reporter, Preiss stated, "Evacuate Chicago is largely my own project. I’m only playing drums and doing the occasional back up vocals, but I wrote the 9 out of 12 songs. Josh did all the guitars and main back ups, and Rob did the lead vocals. Josh did a lot of stuff actually, he wrote the remaining 3 songs, and he engineered and mixed it. But it’s a really personal, pissed off record I wrote when I was 19 and reading a lot of Alice Miller books. It’s very honest, thus the name “Veracity”." When asked if the album would be released on CD, Preiss responded, "We are in fact! Chadd, the artist who did the latest Screaming Mechanical Brain cover did the art for this one as well, and it’s awesome. I can’t draw anything though, so I am easily impressed. But no, that guy rules. And now, as soon as we can afford to get it pressed, we will do so, and have it available online and at shows."

In a Psychostick webcast, Alex Dontre claimed that the album was a product of a "miserable" year in 2004 and noted that a next Evacuate Chicago album is unlikely, because the band is happy and doesn't want to write dishonest songs.

== Track listing ==
No.	Title	Lyrics	Music	Length
1.	"Occasional Letter Number One"	Josh Key	Key	3:56
2.	"Nothing Like You"	Alex Preiss	Preiss, Key	1:56
3.	"Deny"	Preiss	Preiss, Key	2:29
4.	"Perfect Ratio"	Preiss	Preiss	4:00
5.	"The Hole"	Key	Key	4:27
6.	"The Damage Has Been Done"	Preiss	Preiss	2:22
7.	"Proof of Dark Matter"	Preiss	Preiss, Key	3:57
8.	"Progress Beyond Repair"	Preiss	Preiss, Key	2:11
9.	"Velociraptors"	Preiss	Preiss	3:02
10.	"Time Lapse Photography"	Key	Key, Preiss	4:28
11.	"Peace, Love, and Santa Claus"	Preiss	Preiss, Key	3:28
12.	"Forgiveness Epidemic"	Preiss	Preiss, Key	4:48
Total length:				41:03

== Personnel ==
- Alex Preiss – drums, vocals, producer
- Josh Key – guitars, bass, vocals, producer, engineer, mixing
- Rob Kersey – lead vocals
- Rachel Silverton – piano on "Proof of Dark Matter"
- Toxic Recording – recording studio
- Dave Shirk – mastering at Sonorous Mastering, Inc
- Chadd Firchau – artwork
- Rob Kersey – layout
