= Besides, Nothing (B-Sides and Rarities, 2003–2009) =

Compilation album by PlayRadioPlay!
- Released: January 26, 2010
- Genre: Electronic/Indie/Rock
- Length: 73:21 (Disc 1); 70:45 (Disc 2)
- Label: Self-released

PlayRadioPlay! chronology
Ancient Electrons (2010)	Besides, Nothing (B-Sides and Rarities, 2003–2009) (2010)

Besides, Nothing (B-Sides and Rarities, 2003–2009) is a two-disc rarities compilation released under the name PlayRadioPlay! (now Analog Rebellion). It was released alongside Analog Rebellion's Ancient Electrons on January 26, 2010.

The album cover was released on his Facebook page on December 22, 2009.

== Track listing ==
Disc 1: Besides (2009-2006)

1. "Chupacabra"
2. "Nursing Home Hallways"
3. "Things Are Different Now Than They've Ever Been"
4. "You'll Swim 'Cross the Sea"
5. "Words That You've Heard Before"
6. "Mindy's Secret Song"
7. "The Newcomer of Seven Years"
8. "1989"
9. "Selfish Introvert"
10. "Urth Cafe"
11. "Free Shit"
12. "Decipher Reflections From Reality (Re-Done Version)"
13. "Decipher Reflections From Reality (Original Version)"
14. "Dead Snail's Pace"
15. "Happy B-Day Madi"
16. "We've Been Searching the Sky for Answers (Re-Done Version)"
17. "We've Been Searching the Sky for Answers (Original Version)"
18. "Sailin' the Seven Seas Alone"
19. "Oh, Happy Neighbor"
20. "Symmetry"

Disc 2: Nothing (2006-2003)

1. "Bound to Get Caught"
2. "Juice Box, Paper Hat, and a Line of Pixie Sticks"
3. "Same Outfit"
4. "I'm Guessing There's a Pill for That"
5. "The Great Baltimore Fire of 1904 (Re-Done Version)"
6. "The Great Baltimore Fire of 1904 (Original Version)"
7. "Introduce Facts for the Sake of Fiction (Re-Done Version)"
8. "Introduce Facts for the Sake of Fiction (Original Version)"
9. "Jello"
10. "Let it Shine"
11. "Easy to the Slaughter"
12. "Sometimes I Doubt Your Commitment to Sparkle Motion"
13. "There Are Cooler Ways to Die"
14. "1-2-3-Entertain"
15. "This Silly Page is My Favorite Place"
16. "Faint"
17. "Arcade Anthem"
18. "Abe Lincoln's Old School Alibi"
19. "I'm Thinking of a Number Between 1 and 10..."
20. "Either This Man is Dead or My Watch Has Stopped"

== Notes ==
- "Mindy's Secret Song" was written for Mindy White (of States and formerly of the band Lydia).
- "Sometimes I Doubt Your Commitment to Sparkle Motion" is a quote taken from the movie Donnie Darko.
