= Jimmy O =

Background information
- Born: Jean Jimmy Alexandre; March 9, 1974; Port-au-Prince, Haiti
- Origin: New York City, New York, USA
- Died: January 12, 2010 (aged 35) Port-au-Prince, Haiti
- Genres: Hip hop
- Occupations: Musician; Singer-songwriter; Social activist
- Instruments: Vocals, guitar, piano, drums
- Years active: 1987–2010
- Label: Sak Pasé Records

Jean Jimmy Alexandre (March 9, 1974 – January 12, 2010), better known by his stage name Jimmy O, was a Haitian hip hop artist who was born in Port-au-Prince and lived in New York City. He was involved with Wyclef Jean's Yéle Haiti Foundation. Jimmy O performed his music in Haitian Creole.

== Career ==
In 2006, he and Jean held a hip-hop performance in the Bel Air suburb of Port-au-Prince that was part of the USAID-funded Clean Streets project. The following year, he and other Haitian artists held a concert in the Champ de Mars, the largest public square in the capital, along with Wyclef Jean, Akon, and Matt Damon.

== Death ==
On January 12, 2010, at age 35, Jimmy O was crushed inside a vehicle. He was apparently driving in downtown Port-au-Prince during the 2010 Haiti earthquake. His mother, his wife, two of his three children, his agent, and a CNN crew were present when Jimmy O's body was discovered and identified three days later. His agent said that the loss of Jimmy O "will be tremendous in Haiti."

At the time of his death he was preparing to release his debut album Destiny in the United States.
