= Great Danger =

Studio album by the Audition
- Released: March 16, 2010
- Genre: Pop-punk, pop rock
- Length: 32:34
- Label: Victory
- Producer: Mateo Camargo

The Audition chronology
Self-titled Album (2009)	Great Danger (2010)	Chapter II (2012)

Professional ratings
Review scores
Source	Rating
AbsolutePunk	76%
Ox-Fanzine	3.5/5 stars
Rock Sound	8/10 stars

Great Danger is the fourth and final studio album by American pop-punk band the Audition.

== Release ==
In January 2010, the group supported Every Avenue and Sparks the Rescue on their co-headlining US tour. Following this, the Audition embarked on a headlining tour of the US through to the following month. Great Danger was released through Victory Records on March 16. The first single from the album is the third track, "You Ruined This". Between late May and early July, the group went on tour with Hawthorne Heights. In September, the band went on a co-headlining tour of Australia with You Me at Six, where they were supported by Kids in Glass Houses.

== Track listing ==
No.	Title	Length
1.	"Let Me Know"	3:57
2.	"The Art of Living"	3:00
3.	"You Ruined This"	3:11
4.	"He's All You Want"	2:49
5.	"Ms. Crumby"	2:16
6.	"Can You Remember?"	2:40
7.	"Interlude"	0:53
8.	"Honest Mistake"	3:09
9.	"Run Away"	4:08
10.	"Never Heard Again"	3:13
11.	"Final Adventure"	3:18
Total length:		32:34

iTunes bonus track
No.	Title	Length
12.	"Stand Up and Fight"	3:46
