= Virtues (album) =

Studio album by Amber Pacific
- Released: April 13, 2010
- Studios: Jupiter Studios, Seattle, Washington
- Genre: Pop-punk
- Length: 42:44
- Label: Victory
- Producer: Martin Feveyear

Amber Pacific chronology
| Truth in Sincerity (2007) | Virtues (2010) | The Turn (2014) |

Professional ratings
Review scores
| Source | Rating |
|---|---|
| BLARE Magazine | 2/5 stars |
| Alternative Press | 2/5 stars |

Virtues is the third full-length studio album by pop-punk band Amber Pacific, released on April 13, 2010. This was the band's only album on Victory Records and their only without vocalist Matt Young, who left the group in early 2008 to pursue a career in public education. "Three Words" is the lead single off the album, released on March 23, 2010. It was written by the band's new vocalist, Jesse Cottam. This is also the last album with original bassist Greg Strong, who left the band in 2011.

"The Good Life" was previously released on Amber Pacific's self-titled EP, released in 2009, while "An Anthem for the Young at Heart" is currently streaming from the band's official MySpace.

== Track listing ==
All tracks are written by William Nutter, except where noted.

| No. | Title | Length |
|---|---|---|
| 1. | "An Anthem for the Young at Heart" (lyrics by Greg Strong) | 2:22 |
| 2. | "The Girl Who Destroys" (written by Nandy Barry and William Nutter) | 3:05 |
| 3. | "Three Words" (written by Jesse Cottam and Kristine McPhail) | 3:15 |
| 4. | "Shine" | 4:16 |
| 5. | "What Matters Most" | 3:25 |
| 6. | "Conviction" | 3:44 |
| 7. | "The Good Life" | 3:39 |
| 8. | "The Best Mistake" | 3:22 |
| 9. | "We Can't Fake This" | 3:28 |
| 10. | "Burdens of the Past" | 3:40 |
| 11. | "Something to be Said" | 3:28 |
| 12. | "Forever" | 5:08 |
| Total length: | | 42:44 |

== Personnel ==
- Jesse Cottam — lead vocals
- Will Nutter — lead guitar, vocals, keyboards
- Greg Strong — bass
- Dango — drums
- Davy Rispoli — guitar, backup vocals
- Katie Freeze – string arrangements
- Rachael Pearson – violin
- Stephen Bryant – violin
- Sue Jane Bryant – viola
- Walter Gray – cello
