= Ancient Electrons =

Studio album by Analog Rebellion
- Released: January 26, 2010
- Genre: Electronic/Indie/Rock
- Length: 51:58
- Label: Self-released

Analog Rebellion chronology
Texas (2008)	Ancient Electrons (2010)	Besides, Nothing (B-Sides and Rarities, 2003-2009) (2010)

Professional ratings
Review scores
Source	Rating
Absolute Punk	(86%)

Ancient Electrons is the first full length album by musical artist Analog Rebellion (formerly PlayRadioPlay!). It was released on January 26, 2010, alongside the album Besides, Nothing (B-Sides and Rarities, 2003-2009), the artist's last release under the name "PlayRadioPlay!".

Daniel Hunter announced the track listing for Ancient Electrons in October 2009 via AbsolutePunk, Twitter and MySpace. It features 12 songs and 3 segues.

The album cover was released on his Facebook page on December 22, 2009.

== Track listing ==
1. "Brain ≠ Heart (I Need to Know)" - 6:16
2. "A Particularly Long Elevator Shaft" - 3:45
3. "A Real Clever Trick Fur a Bear" - 3:41
4. "You've Been Had (Machine)" - 4:03
5. "An Exercise in Humility" (Segue) - 1:21
6. "Sombrero Negro" - 2:21
7. "North Korea and Kim Jong Il's Fat Fucking Face" (Segue) - 0:39
8. "In the Style of a Tight Rope Walker" - 4:22
9. "Marla Singer Doesn't Take Standardized Tests (Disposable Smile)" - 5:00
10. "Concerning Phillip Garrido" - 4:03
11. "I Am a Ghost (Artifact)" - 3:02
12. "All These Parasites, Uh Huh" (Segue) - 1:09
13. "The New School Shooter" - 6:05
14. "The Parasite Life" - 4:24
15. "An Onest Thank You (Credits & Genres)" - 1:49
