= Stephen Bryant =

English violinist

Stephen Bryant is an English violinist, best known as the leader of the BBC Symphony Orchestra.

== Biography ==
Stephen has led all the British orchestras as well as performed as a soloist. He has taken part in more than hundred commercial recordings.

== Albums ==
=== As violinist ===
- Symphonic Stories (2012)
- Virtues (2010)
- Born To the Breed: A Tribute to Judy Collins (2008)
- Mono In VCF (2008)
- Truth in Sincerity (2007)
- The Golden Age of Hollywood (2003)
- A Life in Reverse: The Music of Minna Keal (1999)
- Atlantis (1991)
- B.C. (1979)
- Handy Dandy Man (1978)

=== As Concertmaster ===
- Wagner - The Ride of the Valkyries and various / 2002 Classics for Pleasure / London Philharmonic
- Stravinsky – The Rite of Spring / 1999 Classics for Pleasure / London Philharmonic
- Mozart – Requiem / Mass in C Minor / 2002 Classics for Pleasure / London Philharmonic
- Busoni – Orchestral Suite No 2 / 2002 Chandos / BBC Philharmonic
- ‘A String Around Autumn’ / 2002 Bis / BBC National Orchestra of Wales
- ‘Best of British’ from the BBC Proms 2007 / 2007 Deutsch Grammophon / BBC Symphony Orchestra
- Judith Weir – The Welcome Arrival of Rain / 2008 NMC / BBC Symphony Orchestra
- Scottish Fantasies for Violin and Orchestra / 2005 CEDIZLE / Scottish Chamber Orchestra
- ‘Perfect Day’ (BBC Children in Need)(Single) / 1997 Chrysalis / BBC Symphony Orchestra
- Gerhard – Symphony / Harpsichord Concerto / 1999 Chandos / BBC Symphony Orchestra
- L’Enfant et les Sortileges / L’Heure Espagnole (DVD) / 2009 / London Philharmonic
- Camilo – Concerto for Piano and Orchestra / 2001 Decca / BBC Symphony Orchestra
- Walton – Symphony No 1 and Takemitsu / 1993 BBC Music Magazine CD / BBC Symphony Orchestra
- Bach – The Conductors’ Transcriptions / 2004 Chandos / BBC Symphony Orchestra
- Elgar – Symphony No2, Serenade / 1989 RCA Victor Red Seal / London Philharmonic
- Rakhmaninov – Symphony No 2, Vocalise / 1992 Nimbus Records / BBC National Orchestra of Wales
- Rakhmaninov – Orchestral Works / 1998 Nimbus Records / BBC National Orchestra of Wales
- Rimsky-Korsakov – Scheherazade / 2005 Classics for Pleasure / London Philharmonic
- ‘Joie de Vivre’ / 2005 Decca / BBC Symphony Orchestra
- Tippett Conducts Tippett Symphonies 2 and 4 / 1993 BBC Music Magazine CD / BBC Symphony Orchestra
- Shostakovich – Daniel Hope / 2006 Warner Classics / BBC Symphony Orchestra
- Bantock – Omar Khayyam / 2007 Chandos / BBC Symphony Orchestra
- ‘The Last Night of the Proms 2003’ / Warner Classics / BBC Symphony Orchestra
- Mendelssohn – Violin Concerto, Symphony No 3 / 2002 Linn Records / Scottish Chamber Orchestra
- Rimsky-Korsakov – Scheherazade / 1990 EMI Eminence / London Philharmonic
- Foulds – A World Requiem / 2008 Chandos / BBC Symphony Orchestra
- Joel – Francois Durand – La Terre et Le Feu / 2004 Mode / BBC Symphony Orchestra
- John Corigliano, Zhou Long / 2005 Warner Classics / BBC Symphony Orchestra
- Bax – Symphony No 6, Festival Overture / 1988 Chandos / London Philharmonic
- Berlioz – Symphonie Fantastique / 1993 BBC Music Magazine CD / BBC Symphony Orchestra
- Janacek – The Excursions of Mr Broucek / 2008 Deutsch Grammophon / BBC Symphony Orchestra
- Susan Graham – Poemes De L’Amour / 2005 Warner Classics / BBC Symphony Orchestra
- The Grainger Edition, Volume 1 / 1996 Chandos / BBC Philharmonic
- Chausson – Le Roi Arthus / 2005 Telarc / BBC Symphony Orchestra
- John Veale, Benjamin Britten – Violin Concertos / 2001 Chandos / BBC Symphony Orchestra
- Medtner – Piano Concerto No 1 in C Minor / 1994 Hyperion / BBC Symphony Orchestra
- Malcolm Arnold – Vernon Handley / 2006 LPO Recording / London Philharmonic
- Bax – Orchestral Works Volume 5 / 2003 Chandos / BBC Symphony Orchestra
- Marx – Orchestral Songs and Choral Works / 2009 Chandos / BBC Symphony Orchestra
- Nikos Skalkottas – 36 Greek Dances, The Return of Ulysses / 2002 Bis / BBC Symphony Orchestra
- Martinu – The 6 Symphonies / 2010 Onyx Classics-BBC / BBC Symphony Orchestra
- Elgar – Dream of Gerontius, Sea Pictures / 2014 Chandos / BBC Symphony Orchestra
- Delius – Concertos / 2011 Chandos / BBC Symphony Orchestra
- Szymanowski – Stabat Mater, Harnasie / 2013 Chandos / BBC Symphony Orchestra
- Szymanowski – Symphony No 2 and 4 / 2013 Chandos / BBC Symphony Orchestra
- Walton – Symphony No 1 / 2014 Chandos / BBC Symphony Orchestra
- British Clarinet Concertos / 2012 Chandos / BBC Symphony Orchestra
- Vaughan Williams – Symphony No 5 / 2007 BBC Music Magazine CD / BBC Symphony Orchestra
- Britten – Phaedra and various / 2011 Chandos / BBC Symphony Orchestra
- Delius – Appalachia / 2011 Chandos / BBC Symphony Orchestra
- Donizetti – Caterina Cornarno / 2013 Opera Rara / BBC Symphony Orchestra
- Smetana – The Bartered Bride / 2012 Harmonia Mundi / BBC Symphony Orchestra
- Lutoslawski – Symphonic Variations / 2012 Chandos / BBC Symphony Orchestra
- Lutoslawski – Vocal Works / 2011 Chandos / BBC Symphony Orchestra
- Lutoslawski – Symphony No 3 / 2010 Chandos / BBC Symphony Orchestra
- Brahms – Schoenberg Piano Quartet / 1991 Collins Classics / London Philharmonic
- Crosse, Bedford / 1997 NMC / BBC Symphony Orchestra
- Gerhard – Various / 1997 Chandos / BBC Symphony Orchestra
- Nyman – Trombone Concerto / 1997 EMI / BBC Symphony Orchestra
- Matthews, Musgrave / 1998 NMC / BBC Symphony Orchestra
- Tchaikovski, Scriabin / 1993 Hyperion / BBC Symphony Orchestra
- Dillon – Ignis Noster / Helle Nacht / 1994 Disques Montaigne / BBC Symphony Orchestra
- Sackman, Hawthorn / 1995 NMC / BBC Symphony Orchestra
- Martinu – The Epic of Gilgamesh / 1995 BBC Music Magazine CD / BBC Symphony Orchestra
- Sawer – Byrnan Wood / 1995 NMC / BBC Symphony Orchestra
- Ruders – Concerto in Pieces / 1995 Dorling Kindersley / BBC Symphony Orchestra
- Brahms – Symphony No 4 / 1997 BBC Music Magazine CD / BBC Symphony Orchestra
- Bax – Tintagel / 1997 BBC Music Magazine CD / BBC Symphony Orchestra
- Mozart – Violin Concertos / 1989 Pony Canyon / London Philharmonic
- Vivaldi – Seasons / 1989 Collins Classics / London Philharmonic
- Mozart – La Clemenza di Tito / 1995 Poorhouse Productions DVD / London Philharmonic
- Furtwangler – Symphony No 2 / 1992 Naxos / BBC Philharmonic

=== As Soloist ===
- Timothy Salter – Parallax / 1996 Usk
- A Life in Reverse – The music of Minna Keal / 1996 Lorelt
- The Golden Age of Hollywood / 2003 BBC Music Magazine CD
