= June (Illinois band) =

- Origin: Chicago, Illinois
- Genres: Pop punk, emo
- Years active: 2003–08
- Label: Victory Records

June was an American rock band from Chicago, Illinois.

== History ==
The band formed in 2002 under the name Drive Like June for the purpose of playing local shows in Chicago, and they later changed their name to June for legal reasons and self-released a demo EP in 2004. They embarked on a tour of the Southern US states in July and August 2004. Their self-titled EP was made available for streaming through their website on July 28, 2004. They signed to Victory Records in October 2004. In August 2005, Victory Records released If You Speak Any Faster with hit single "Patrick" in August of that year and touring widely across the United States. The group's second album for Victory was released on August 7, 2007, entitled Make It Blur. On February 3, 2008, June went on an indefinite hiatus. They explained that "we just all feel we need to change something." The band's last show was on April 12, 2008 at Metro Chicago with Powerspace and Halos.

== Members ==
- Tim Brennan - vocals, guitar
- AJ Brown - vocals, bass
- Mark Palacz - guitar
- Mark Sutor - drums

== Discography ==
- This Side of Your Room EP, performed as Drive Like June
- The June EP (2004)
- If You Speak Any Faster (2005) Billboard Top Heatseekers peak No. 38, Top Independent Albums peak No. 49
- Make It Blur (2007)

== Singles ==
- "Patrick" (2005)
- "My Side of the Story" (2005)
- "I'd Lose Myself" (2007)
