= The Graduate (band) =

American band

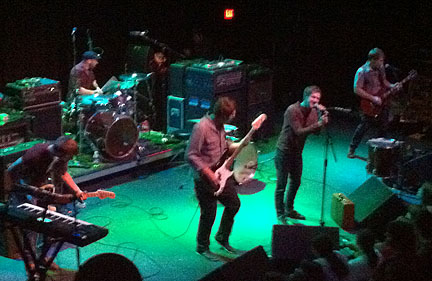

Background information
- Origin: Springfield, Illinois; Quincy, Illinois
- Genres: Emo; Rock; Indie rock
- Years active: 2005–2011
- Labels: Icon MES; Razor & Tie
- Members: Matt Kennedy; Tim Moore; Max Sauer; Corey Warning; Jared Wuestenberg
- Website: Official website

The Graduate was an American indie/emo band from Springfield, Illinois.

== History ==
The Graduate formed in central Illinois in November 2005, after the breakup of two other local bands (Best of Winter from Quincy, Illinois and Jack from Springfield, Illinois) whose members began playing shows together. Lead singer Corey Warning said of the band's name, "None of us graduated from college. Well, we all graduated from high school, but none of us from college, so the name's kind of ironic." The band independently released an EP entitled Horror Show in April 2006, and toured nationally with bands such as Jack's Mannequin, The Audition, The Junior Varsity, Punchline, Waking Ashland, and Secondhand Serenade.

In late 2006, College Music Journal featured The Graduate on the cover of the CMJ New Music Report for being the most added band to college radio stations during the week of December 3, 2006. 167 stations added their EP, Horror Show to their airplay lineup in total. On April 6, 2007, Spin named The Graduate its Band of the Day.

The Graduate released their debut full-length album, Anhedonia on April 10, 2007. The band played a number of Warped Tour shows in the summer of 2007 to promote their new album as well as supporting acts such as The Audition and Spitalfield on two separate U.S. tours. They also played at Lollapalooza that year. The band then went on a short European/UK headlining tour which included playing the German music festival, Rock am See.

On November 27, 2007, The Graduate released The Evergreen EP as an early Christmas gift for fans. The EP includes acoustic versions of "Anhedonia" and "The City That Reads" from Anhedonia as well as a cover of "Blue Christmas" and a previously unreleased song "Gunslinger". The album was issued in a limited run of 5,000 copies which were given out free at FYE record stores, mostly in their home state of Illinois.

In the summer of 2008, The Graduate completed a U.S. tour with My American Heart, Secondhand Serenade, PlayRadioPlay, and Rookie of the Year. On October 31, 2008, the group's label, Icon MES, folded, and because of this, the deluxe edition of their debut entitled Anhedonia Revisited (which had been slated for release on November 4, 2008) was cancelled. Following a tour with Ludo and Eye Alaska in November 2008, the group announced plans to write and record their follow-up full-length.

The band signed with Razor & Tie in May 2010; Brian McTernan produced their sophomore full-length album Only Every Time, which was released on August 31, 2010. Only Every Time reached No. 28 on the Billboard Heatseekers chart. Only Every Time was followed in 2011 with Every Other Time (a digital-only EP of B-sides) and the Sea Legs EP, as well as a vinyl release of Only Every Time on American Dream Records.

On July 1, 2011, The Graduate announced an indefinite hiatus.

On July 8, 2011, The Graduate announced that their final show would be at Reggie's Rock Club in Chicago, IL. On August 27, 2011 The Graduate performed their final show which was recorded live. Following the filming of the final show the band's frontman, Corey Warning, started a Kickstarter project with which they hoped to raise money to make a DVD commemorating the band and featuring their last show. The project's original goal, set on September 18, 2011 was to raise $3,000. Funding for the project ended October 18, 2011 and with 210 backers, the project was funded 350% ($10,513).

== Members ==
- Corey Warning – lead vocals
- Matt Kennedy – guitar, backing vocals, keyboards
- Max Sauer – guitar, backing vocals
- Jared Wuestenberg – bass
- Tim Moore – drums

== Discography ==
=== Albums ===
- Anhedonia (2007, Icon MES Records)
- Only Every Time (2010, Razor & Tie)

=== EPs ===
- Horror Show (2006, self-pressed)
- The Evergreen EP (2007, Icon MES Records)
- Every Other Time (B-Sides from Only Every Time) (2011 Razor and Tie)
- Sea Legs (EP) (2011, self-released)
