= Analog Rebellion =

Independent rock music project

- Origin: Aledo, Texas, United States
- Genres: Space rock, Indie rock
- Years active: 2005–2016
- Labels: DABBO RECORDS, Stolen Transmission, Island Records
- Members: Daniel Hunter
- Website: www.analogrebellion.com

Analog Rebellion (formerly PlayRadioPlay!) is the solo, independent music project of Aledo, Texas songwriter Daniel Hunter. Hunter's solo career was started under the name PlayRadioPlay! in December 2005. Hunter changed the name to Analog Rebellion in September 2009, stating in his blog "I have come to the point where I no longer feel that the name PlayRadioPlay! represents the music I create".

Hunter writes, records and performs all of his own music, and refers to his sound as "stadium lo-fi", an oxymoronic synthesis of the low fidelity genre and stadium rock genre. Hunter's most recent music has been compared to The Paper Chase, Pixies and Secret Machines. In April 2010, Dallas Observer called Hunter "the most promising 20-year-old musician from DFW since Palomo".

== Career ==
=== 2008: Early success ===
Hunter began creating music in his garage, but it was not until he discovered music programming in music theory class at Aledo High School he began to create electronic-based music.

After rapidly gaining popularity on Myspace, Hunter signed with Island/Stolen Transmission midway through his senior year of high school. Hunter released an EP entitled The Frequency E.P. on April 27, 2007, which debuted at No. 6 on the Billboard Electronic chart and No. 27 on the Heatseekers chart. A full-length album entitled Texas was released March 18, 2008 debuting at No. 157 on the Billboard 200. In support of the album, he toured nationally with American rock bands Fall Out Boy, Secondhand Serenade, Yellowcard, The Spill Canvas, Hellogoodbye and Making April.

Hunter left Island Records in late June 2008 after a two-year run. He described his affiliation with the company as a "nightmare" in his Myspace blog. Shortly after, on June 27, 2008, Hunter announced in his Myspace blog he had demoed a new EP entitled The Organic/Synthetic along with another unnamed EP; its songs were eventually released on his 2010 releases, Ancient Electrons and Besides, Nothing (B-Sides and Rarities, 2003–2009).

=== 2009: Post-Island activity ===
On July 27, 2009, Hunter announced he would be simultaneously releasing a full-length album with new songs and a B-Sides album featuring songs from 2003–2009. Some of the songs had been posted on the Internet on different file-sharing sites, or performed live; others were songs that did not make it onto The Frequency E.P. or Texas, and some were PlayRadioPlay! 'classics' in their original form.

On July 31, 2009, Hunter announced he would be attempting to involve his fans in the creation of his new album. For a donation of a minimum of $10.00, the donor could have their name listed in the album credits as "Executive Producer _____". The donations were being raised to help promote and distribute the album. On September 17, 2009 it was announced the band's name would be changed to Analog Rebellion. On October 13, 2009 Hunter confirmed he would be releasing a new full-length album called Ancient Electrons under the new name.

=== 2010-present: Ancient Electrons and other releases ===
On January 26, 2010, Hunter released two full-length albums, Ancient Electrons and Besides, Nothing (B-Sides and Rarities, 2003–2009). Both albums were made available at the Analog Rebellion merchandise store, and digitally via iTunes on the iTunes Store.

On April 22, 2010, Hunter announced Cavanaugh, Something (Pre-Sides and Varieties), a six-song, limited edition EP featuring demos and alternate versions of songs that will be on upcoming releases.

On February 18, 2014, Ill'e Grande was released. Hunter and DABBO RECORDS have since changed the live arrangement to a 5-piece band.

== Touring members ==
- Daniel Hunter - vocals, guitar
- Cory Harvard - drums
- Jeremy Lee Given - Keys
- Eric Messihi - Bassle
- Taylor Pile - Guitar/ MPC

Jon Burrow - drums (occasionally)

== Discography ==
=== Island releases ===
| Year | Notes |
|---|---|
| 2007 | The Frequency E.P.: First EP; Released: April 24, 2007 on Stolen Transmission Records; Released under the name PlayRadioPlay! |
| 2008 | Texas: First LP; Released: March 18, 2008 on Island Records; Released under the name PlayRadioPlay! |

=== Post-Island releases ===
| Year | Notes |
|---|---|
| 2010 | Ancient Electrons: Second LP; Released: January 26, 2010 independently; First release under the name Analog Rebellion; Cover art contiguous with art of Besides, Nothing |
| 2010 | Besides, Nothing (B-Sides and Rarities, 2003–2009): Double disc B-Sides album; Released: January 26, 2010 independently; Last release under the name PlayRadioPlay!; Cover art contiguous with art of Ancient Electrons |
| 2010 | Cavanaugh, Something (Pre-Sides and Varieties): Third EP featuring demos and alternate versions of songs; Released: April 22, 2010 independently; Free with any Analog Rebellion online store order; Hand-stenciled album art |
| 2010 | Dogs Are Better Than Cats: Fourth EP featuring mostly acoustic, one-take songs; Announced on July 5, 2010; Released: October 15, 2010 independently; Cover art by fan Jason Miller |
| 2011 | Evaders: Fifth EP featuring songs recorded in one take; Announced on October 16, 2010; Released: November 30, 2011 independently |
| 2012 | Full Frontal: Third LP; Announced on January 13, 2012; Release Date: December 4, 2012 |
| 2012 | Get Bent (B-Sides and Demos, 2010-2012): Originally titled "Good For You"; Announced on January 13, 2012; Release Date: December 4, 2012 |
| 2012 | How To Be Lo-Fi With Friends: Documentary covering the recording of "Full Frontal" and other songs; Announced on January 13, 2012; Release Date: December 4, 2012 independently |
| 2014 | Ill'e Grande: Release Date: February 18, 2014 DABBO RECORDS |
| 2020 | Has-Been (B-Sides and Demos, 2013-2016): First release to not start with a subsequent letter of the alphabet since Ancient Electrons; Release Date: July 24, 2020 |
