= The Forecast =

American indie rock band

- Origin: Peoria, Illinois, US
- Genres: Emo; Indie rock Alternative country
- Years active: 2001-2017, 2023-present
- Labels: Clifton Motel; Eyeball Records; Victory Records (Previously)
- Members: Dustin Addis; Shannon Burns; Tony Peck; Kevin Ohls

The Forecast is an indie rock band from Peoria, Illinois. The Forecast's sound is most recognizable for containing strong two and three part harmonies performed by combinations of their multiple vocalists, as heard in tracks such as "Red as the Moon" and "One Hundred Percent."

== Band history ==
In 2001, the band was started with Dustin Addis, the only remaining original member. The band's current line up came together in the summer of 2004 when Shannon Burns and Matt Webb left their old band, Casting Lines.

They released a split, a full-length album, and a four-song EP while signed to Thinker Thought Records. They released their first full-length album, with their current line-up, May 17, 2005, titled Late Night Conversations. The Forecast's hit "These Lights" was featured in MVP 06 NCAA Baseball. Their second album, In the Shadow of Two Gunmen, was released on May 30, 2006, via Victory Records and was promoted by a national tour with bands Socratic, Mashlin, and Tourmaline.

Early in 2009, the band self-released a five-song EP titled "Alive For The First Time." The EP featured two new songs, two acoustic versions of old songs and a cover song.

After spending more than two years unsigned, the group released a self-titled full-length through Eyeball Records on February 16, 2010.

All four members of the Forecast have the band's "ambulance" logo tattooed on them.

In 2020, Dustin Addis was interviewed for Drunken Lullabies, and the interviewer stated that the group has been on hiatus for several years.

In August 2023, the band reunited to perform at Iowa is for Lovers festival, as well as a one-off show in their hometown of Peoria.

In late 2023, The Forecast was added to the 2024 When We Were Young Festival line-up, followed by an announcement that they were releasing a new album on February 9, 2024 titled Good Journey.

== Members ==
=== Current ===
- Shannon Burns – bass, vocals
- Dustin Addis – vocals, guitar
- Tony Peck – drums
- Kevin Ohls – guitar

=== Former ===
- Matt Webb – guitar, vocals
- Jared Grabb – guitar, vocals
- Marsha Satterfield – bass, vocals
- Rhys Miller – drums, vocals
- Derrick Hostetter – drums
- Mitch Leefers – guitar, vocals
- Craig Comte – drums
- Dan Fiedler – bass, vocals
- Jenni Black – vocals, guitar

== Discography ==
- Proof of Impact (Thinker Thought Records, 2003)
- 1090 Club/The Forecast Split (Thinker Thought, 2004)
- Relationships Ruin Friendships EP (Thinker Thought, 2005)
- Late Night Conversations (Victory Records, 2005)
- In the Shadow of Two Gunmen (Victory Records, 2006)
- Alive for the First Time EP (Whiskey Dead Music, 2009)
- The Forecast (Eyeball Records, 2010)
- Everybody Left (Clifton Motel, 2012)
- Good Journey (Self-released, 2024)
