= The Audition (band) =

American rock band

- Origin: Chicago, Illinois, USA
- Genres: Pop punk; pop rock; emo pop
- Years active: 2003–2012; 2018
- Labels: Victory; MME
- Past members: Jimmy Lopez; Evo Soria; Bob Morris; Patrick Fanella; Danny Stevens; Timmy Klepek; Ryan O'Connor; Seth Johnson; Joe Lussa

The Audition was an American rock band from Chicago, Illinois. The band was composed of singer Danny Stevens, drummer Ryan O'Connor, guitarists Seth Johnson and Timmy Klepek and bassist Joe Lussa. The band's first release was a six track EP titled All in Your Head. In early 2005, they signed to record label Victory Records and released their debut album, titled Controversy Loves Company. In early January 2008 they released their second studio album Champion. On April 28, 2009 they released their third studio album Self-titled Album. Their latest full-length album Great Danger was released on March 16, 2010.

The Audition released a new EP titled Chapter II on February 14, 2012—their first new music since leaving Victory Records.

The original members reunited in 2018 to play three dates on the UK festival, Slam Dunk.

== History ==
=== Formation and debut album (2003–2007) ===
Drummer Ryan O'Connor and bassist Joe Lussa along with former guitarist/songwriter Bob Morris formed the core of the band in their hometown of Elmhurst, Illinois in 2003, working with a revolving cast of musicians in their early years. Their first EP, titled "Every Scar Tells A Story," had 6 songs, including a song called 'A Lifetime In Six Months' which would later be called 'Fashion Hour'. They recorded their second EP, "All in Your Head", at The Gallery of Carpet before Danny Stevens, Seth Johnson and Timmy Klepek joined the group, and played some gigs with other local Chicago acts like The Academy Is.... Stevens, who became the singer, was originally brought in to play guitar for the band. The Audition then signed to Victory Records; national touring followed, and Controversy Loves Company, their debut LP for the label, was released in September 2005 to mixed reviews. The band's lineup at the time of the CD release included O'Connor, Lussa, guitarists Seth Johnson and Timmy Klepek, and vocalist Danny Stevens. Touring with Silverstein and Spitalfield ensued in February 2006; more touring with Mae and Lovedrug followed later in 2006.

In 2006, The Audition joined 30 Seconds to Mars for their Summer tour. In early 2007 the band joined Head Automatica and Jack's Mannequin on The West Coast Winter Tour, including dates in Canada. Shortly after this tour they scored the support slot for New Found Glory on their Australian tour in April 2007. Following this they headlined a nationwide tour, supported by Monty Are I, New Atlantic, and The Graduate. They have also toured nationally with Rock Kills Kid. They played on the Warped Tour in 2006 and returned for Warped Tour 2007. They also supported Boys Like Girls on Tourzilla with All Time Low, We the Kings, and Valencia in late 2007. Coming off an appearance at Austin's SXSW festival, the band went on a full US tour with Hit The Lights, with sets scheduled at both east and west coast Bamboozle events. Following some festival appearances throughout the UK, such as the Reading and Leeds Festivals, in May they took part on the entire 2008 edition of Van's Warped Tour and a visit back to Australia in May/June supporting Story of the Year.

=== Subsequent activity (2008–present) ===
In January 2008 they released their second full-length LP titled Champion to more positive reviews. It is the first album by the band to make it into the Billboard 200, entering at No. 157. Throughout February and March 2009 The Audition took part in the Soundwave festival. The band's third album was released on April 28, 2009, titled 'Self-Titled Album'. Before release, the band released a preview to three songs off of the upcoming album on their MySpace page. On January 28 it was announced on their official blog that original bassist and founding member Joe Lussa would be leaving the band. Bass duties were handled by Klepek and the band continued for this period as a four-piece. The Audition replaced Kill Hannah on the Madina Lake 2009 British tour. They also toured with All Time Low in September and October 2009 and joined Cobra Starship on their "Hot Mess Across the U.S." Tour in late August 2009 with The Friday Night Boys and Skeet Skeet, replacing Plastiscines. The Audition played with This Providence, Anarbor, and The Bigger Lights in the 'Bout Damn Time tour Spring 2010. The band announced in July 2010 that they were no longer signed to Victory Records. The Audition toured in Australia in September 2010 with You Me At Six.

The band announced they would be writing and recording after the tour and released a fifteen-second clip of a new song on their Facebook page in November. The clip was unavailable shortly after being posted, but in February, the band announced on their Twitter that they would be releasing new music in the spring. It was announced on 21 September 2011 that original bass player Joe Lussa had rejoined the band and that original guitarist Seth Johnson had left, to be replaced by Jimmy Lopez. On February 14, 2012, the band released a 6-song EP titled Chapter II - EP. In February and March, the group supported Every Avenue and We Are the In Crowd on their co-headlining US tour. In Spring of 2012 the band toured with the band Eve 6, in support of new albums both had produced. July 2014 saw the band hinting at the possibility of a new album, with Seth Johnson returning to the fold. In May 2018, the group reunited for performances at Slam Dunk Festival in the UK.

== Musical style ==
According to AllMusic, the band's style is pop-punk that combines emo with "guitar-driven" rock music. Kerrang! classified them as a "MySpace band".

== Members ==
- Danny Stevens – lead vocals, guitars, keyboard, piano (2005–2012, 2018)
- Timothy Klepek – guitar, backing vocals (2004–2012, 2018)
- Ryan O'Connor – drums, percussion (2003–2012, 2018)
- Seth Johnson – lead guitar (2004–2011, 2017)
- Joe Lussa – bass (2003–2012, 2018)

=== Former members ===
- Robert "Bob" Morris – guitar (2003–2005)
- Evo Soria – vocals (2003–2005)
- Patrick Fanella (2003–2005)
- Tom Bahri – guitar (2004)
- Jimmy Lopez – rhythm guitar (2011–2012)

== Discography ==
=== Albums ===
Title	Details	Peak chart positions		
Title	Details	US	US Heat	US Indie
Controversy Loves Company	Released: September 20, 2005; Label: Victory (VR248); Format: CD, digital download	—	—	—
Champion	Released: January 22, 2008; Label: Victory (VR339); Format: CD, digital download	157	5	20
Self-titled Album	Released: April 28, 2009; Label: Victory (VR486); Format: CD, digital download	—	7	28
Great Danger	Released: March 16, 2010; Label: Victory (VR561); Format: CD, digital download	—	17	—
"—" denotes a recording that did not chart or was not released in that territory.

=== EPs ===
Title	Details
All in Your Head	Released: 2004; Label: 13th Floor (13thFlrR001); Format: CD, digital download
Chapter II	Released: February 14, 2012; Label: Roadside/MME; Format: CD, digital download

=== Music videos ===
- "Dance Dance Revolution (Dance Halls Turn to Ghost Towns)" (2004)
- "You've Made Us Conscious" (2006)
- "Approach the Bench" (2005)
- "Don't Be So Hard" (2005)
- "Warm Me Up" (2008)
- "Make It Rain" (2008)
- "My Temperature's Rising" (2009)
- "You Ruined This" (2010)
- "You Make Me Sick" (2012)

=== Other appearances ===
Title	Year	Album
"Summer" (demo)	2003	Get Around Records & Friends 2003 Summer Sampler
"You've Made Us Conscious" (demo)	2004	Victory Records Spring Sampler
"Don't Be So Hard" (acoustic)	2007	Punk Goes Acoustic 2
"Livin' on a Prayer" (Bon Jovi cover)	2007	Higher Voltage – Another Brief History of Rock
