= Jukebox the Ghost discography =

Jukebox the Ghost is an American three-piece power pop band formed in the Washington, D.C. Metro Area. The band consists of Ben Thornewill (vocals & piano), Tommy Siegel (vocals & guitar) and Jesse Kristin (drums). The band has been active since 2003.

== Albums ==
=== Studio albums ===
List of studio albums, with selected chart positions
Title	Album details	Peak chart positions				
Title	Album details	US	US Heat	US Indie	US Alt	US Rock
Let Live & Let Ghosts	Released: April 22, 2008; Label: Self-released; Format(s): CD, LP, digital download	—	—	—	—	—
Everything Under the Sun	Released: September 7, 2010; Label: Yep Roc; Format(s): CD, LP, digital download	—	—	—	—	—
Safe Travels	Released: June 5, 2012; Label: Yep Roc; Format(s): CD, LP, digital download	—	12	13	—	—
Jukebox the Ghost	Released: October 21, 2014; Label: Yep Roc; Format(s): CD, LP, digital download	121	3	22	19	28
Off to the Races	Released: March 30, 2018; Label: Self-released; Format(s): CD, LP, digital download	— (Note: Off to the Races did not enter the Billboard 200, but peaked at number 79 on the Top Album Sales component chart.)	5	13	—	—
Cheers	Released: May 27, 2022; Label: Self-released; Format(s): CD, LP, digital download	—	—	—	—	—
Phantasmagorical Vol. 1	Released: October 10, 2025; Label: Self-released; Format(s): CD, LP, digital download	—	—	—	—	—
"—" denotes albums that did not chart.

=== Live albums ===
List of live albums, with track listings and notes
Title	Album details	Notes
Long Way Home	Released: December 2, 2016; Label: Self-released; Track listing: 1. "Good Day"; 2. "The Stars"; 3. "Girl"; 4. "Sound of a Broken Heart"; 5. "The Great Unknown"; 6. "Keys in the Car"; 7. "Schizophrenia"; 8. "Black Hole" (from Peabody and Sherman); 9. "Postcard"; 10. "Somebody"; 11. "Victoria"; 12. "Undeniable You"; 13. "Hollywood"; 14. "Static"; 15. "Long Way Home"; 16. "Nobody"; 17. "Adulthood"; 18. "Mistletoe"; 19. "When the Nights Get Long"; 20. "Carrying"; 21. "At Last"; 22. "The Sun"; 23. "Everybody Knows"; 24. "The Popular Thing"; 25. "Beady Eyes on the Horizon"; 26. "Hold It in Supreme"; 27. "Empire"	Recordings from the 2016 tour of the group's self-titled album, produced by Kickstarter. The album includes songs chosen only by the wheel of torture but does not include covers of "Under Pressure" and "Bicycle Race" by Queen due to copyright issues.

== Extended plays ==
List of extended plays, with track listings and notes
Title	Album details	Notes
Mistletoe	Released: November 30, 2010; Label: Yep Roc; Track listing: 1. "Mistletoe"; 2. "This Year"; 3. "Schizophrenia (Acoustic)"; 4. "Half Crazy" (Acoustic)	Contains a new holiday song "This Year", as well as "Mistletoe" and two acoustic covers from Everything Under the Sun (2010).
I Love You Always Forever	Released: April 21, 2012; Label: Yep Roc; Track listing: 1. "I Love You Always Forever"; 2. "Temptation"	The EP was released on vinyl for Record Store Day 2012.
Jukebox the Ghost & Jenny Owen Youngs	Released: July 22, 2013; Label: Self-released; Track listing: 1. "Last Person"; 2. "Good Day"; 3. "Nighty Night"; 4. "Ghosts in Empty Houses"	Collaborative project between the titular artists, who each receive lead credit on each track.
The BSide Session	Released: 2015; Label: Self-released; Track listing: 1. "Long Way Home" (Acoustic); 2. "Undeniable You" (Acoustic)	Contains acoustic covers of two songs from their 2014 self-titled album.
Thump Sessions	Released: March 11, 2016; Label: Self-released; Track listing: 1. "Empire" (Acoustic); 2. "Summer Sun" (Acoustic); 3. "Half Crazy" (Acoustic); 4. "At Last" (Acoustic); 5. "The Stars" (Acoustic); 6. "Adulthood" (Acoustic)	Contains six acoustic covers of songs from their previous albums.
The Wild Honey Pie Buzzsession	Released: July 7, 2017; Label: Self-released; Track listing: 1. "Keys in the Car"; 2. "Girl"	Both tracks are subtitled with "The Wild Honey Pie Buzzsession".

== Singles ==
List of singles as lead artist, with selected chart positions, showing year released and album name
Title	Year	Peak chart positions		Album
Title	Year	US Alt Airplay	US Rock Airplay	Album
"Hold It In"	2008	—	—	Let Live & Let Ghosts
"Good Day"	2008	—	—	Let Live & Let Ghosts
"Empire"	2010	—	—	Everything Under the Sun
"Schizophrenia"	2010	—	—	Everything Under the Sun
"Half Crazy"	2010	—	—	Everything Under the Sun
"Summer Sun"	2010	—	—	Everything Under the Sun
"Somebody"	2012	—	—	Safe Travels
"Oh, Emily"	2012	—	—	Safe Travels
"A La La"	2012	—	—	Safe Travels
"The Great Unknown"	2014	—	—	Jukebox the Ghost
"Postcard"	2014	—	—	Jukebox the Ghost
"Hollywood"	2014	—	—	Jukebox the Ghost
"Walk Like an Egyptian" (featuring Secret Someones)	2015	—	—	Non-album singles
"Stay the Night"	2017	—	—	Non-album singles
"Everybody's Lonely"	2018	22	26	Off to the Races
"Jumpstarted"	2018	—	—	Off to the Races
"Fred Astaire"	2018	—	—	Off to the Races
"The Other Side"	2019	—	—	Off to the Races (Deluxe Edition)
"It's No Secret"	2019	—	—	Off to the Races (Deluxe Edition)
"Call Me Joe"	2020	—	—	Non-album singles
"Getting Older"	2020	—	—	Non-album singles
"Cheers!"	2021	—	—	Cheers
"Ramona"	2021	—	—	Cheers
"Wasted"	2022	—	—	Cheers
"Million Dollar Bills"	2022	—	—	Cheers
"Hey Maude"	2022	—	—	Cheers
"I Got A Girl"	2022	—	—	Cheers (Deluxe Edition)
"Automatic"	2023	—	—	Phantasmagorical Vol. 1
"Save a Little Room"	2023	—	—	Phantasmagorical Vol. 1
"Friends Again"	2024	—	—	Phantasmagorical Vol. 1
"I Feel So Good"	2024	—	—	Non-album single
"Truth"	2024	—	—	Phantasmagorical Vol. 1
"Phantasmagorical (Opening)"	2025	—	—	Phantasmagorical Vol. 1
"Emotional Fraud"	2025	—	—	Phantasmagorical Vol. 1
"End of the Show"	2025	—	—	Phantasmagorical Vol. 1
"Stranger"	2025	—	—	Phantasmagorical Vol. 1
"—" denotes a recording that did not chart.

== Other appearances ==
Title	Year	Album	Length	Notes
"Cross My Mind"	2015	Tour Split EP	4:35	Twin Forks cover
"Your Love Isn't Different"	2015	The Gayest Compilation Ever Made, Vol. 3	3:58	
"The Spiritual" (Live)	2020	Live at Yep Roc 15	3:55	
