= Love Is a Battlefield =

1983 single by Pat Benatar

- US 7-inch picture sleeve

Single by Pat Benatar

from the album Live from Earth
- B-side: "Hell Is for Children" (live version)
- Released: September 12, 1983
- Recorded: 1983
- Studio: MCA Whitney (Glendale, California)
- Genre: Dance-rock; pop rock; post-disco
- Length: 5:23 (album version); 4:11 (single edit)
- Label: Chrysalis
- Songwriters: Mike Chapman; Holly Knight
- Producers: Neil Giraldo; Peter Coleman

Pat Benatar singles chronology
"Looking for a Stranger" (1983)	"Love Is a Battlefield" (1983)	"We Belong" (1984)

Audio sample
- file; help

Music video
- "Love Is a Battlefield" on YouTube

"Love Is a Battlefield" is a song by American singer Pat Benatar, released on September 12, 1983, as the first and only single outside of New Zealand from her live album Live from Earth (1983), though the song itself was a studio recording. It was written by Holly Knight and Mike Chapman. "Love Is a Battlefield" went on to sell over a million records. The song was ranked at number 30 in VH1's list of the 100 Greatest Songs of the 1980s.

== Background and composition ==
Knight and Chapman wrote the song for Benatar initially as a mid tempo song. After some exploration with drum machines and the band, producer Neil Giraldo decided to make it an uptempo song. The single was Benatar's second US million-seller and is tied with "We Belong" as her highest-charting single in the United States. It topped Billboard's Mainstream Rock Tracks chart for four weeks and peaked at number five on the Billboard Hot 100 in December 1983.

"Love Is a Battlefield" is a dance-rock, pop rock and post-disco song, set in the key of D minor. While sometimes seen as a ballad, many argue the song's tempo of 91 beats per minute is too fast to qualify as such.

== Release ==
It reached number one on the Australian singles chart in February 1984 and remained there for five weeks, becoming the 11th biggest-selling single of the year. In the Netherlands, the song topped the charts for four weeks; it reached number two on the 1984 year-end chart. The song originally peaked at the bottom of the top 50 in the United Kingdom, but was re-released there in March 1985 following the success of "We Belong" and reached number 17. It was awarded a gold certification in Canada as well.

The single was unlike most of Benatar's previous work, as it featured an electronic dance element, but guitars and drums were still present. In 1984, the song won Benatar her fourth consecutive Grammy Award for Best Female Rock Vocal Performance.

== Music video ==
The Bob Giraldi-directed music video features Benatar playing a rebellious teenage girl runaway (Benatar was actually 30 at the time). Her abusive father (played by actor Trey Wilson) warns her as she runs away from home after no longer taking the abuse, "If you leave this house now, you can just forget about coming back!", as her mother watches helplessly. Benatar waves goodbye to her brother (played by actor Philip Cruise), who watches sadly from an upstairs window. She later becomes a taxi dancer at a seedy club in the city. She writes letters to her brother, who is reassured that she is okay, as her father begins to regret yelling at her. When she witnesses the club owner (played by actor Gary Chryst) harassing another dancer, Benatar rounds up her fellow dancers and leads a rebellion against him. The dancers get the upper hand on the club owner and escape from the club, dancing off as the sun rises. After thanking Benatar for helping liberate them, the dancers bid each other goodbye, and all go their separate ways. The video ends with Benatar sitting in the back of a bus headed for an unknown destination. The video was choreographed by Michael Peters, who appears briefly in the video.

A special dance club remix of the song was created by Jellybean Benitez. Benitez also created an edited version of his mix specifically for the video. It differs slightly in structure and instrumentation, and aside from appearing in the video, has never been commercially released.

The video was one of the first ever to feature the use of dialogue - Philip Bailey's "I Know" was the first but Benatar's got more exposure. The scenes featuring dialogue include the opening argument scene between Benatar and her father in which he shouts at her, "If you leave this house now, you can just forget about coming back!" and the scene when the club owner harasses the taxi dancer, causing her to scream "Leave me alone!" at him.

The video was nominated for an MTV Video Music Award for Best Female Video.

== Track listings ==
U.S. 7-inch single / U.K. 7-inch single (1984 release)

1. "Love is a Battlefield" (Single version) – 4:00
2. "Hell is for Children" (Live) – 6:06

U.S. 12-inch maxi-single

1. "Love is a Battlefield" (Special Extended Remix) – 6:31
2. "Love is a Battlefield" (Instrumental) – 5:20

U.K. 12-inch maxi-single (1984 release)

1. "Love is a Battlefield" (Special Extended Remix) – 6:31
2. "Hell is for Children" (Live) – 6:06
3. "Love is a Battlefield" (Instrumental) – 5:20

U.K. 7-inch single (1985 re-release)

1. "Love is a Battlefield" (Single version) – 4:00
2. "Here's My Heart" – 4:53

U.K. 12-inch maxi-single (1985 re-release)

1. "Love is a Battlefield" (Special Extended Remix) – 6:31
2. "Here's My Heart" – 4:53
3. "Love is a Battlefield" (Single version) – 4:00

Note: The extended remix was mixed by John "Jellybean" Benitez.

== Charts ==
=== Weekly charts ===
Weekly chart performance for "Love Is a Battlefield"
Chart (1983–1984)	Peak position
Australia (Kent Music Report)	1
Belgium (Ultratop 50 Flanders)	1
Canada Top Singles (RPM)	2
Europe (European Top 100 Singles)	24
Ireland (IRMA)	9
Netherlands (Dutch Top 40)	1
Netherlands (Single Top 100)	1
New Zealand (Recorded Music NZ)	6
Switzerland (Schweizer Hitparade)	11
UK Singles (Official Charts)	49
US Billboard Hot 100	5
US Dance Club Songs (Billboard)	41
US Mainstream Rock (Billboard)	1
US Cash Box Top 100 Singles	4
West Germany (GfK)	3

Weekly chart performance for "Love Is a Battlefield" (UK re-release)
Chart (1985)	Peak position
Europe (European Top 100 Singles)	61
Luxembourg (Radio Luxembourg)	15
UK Singles (Official Charts)	17

=== Year-end charts ===
1983 year-end chart performance for "Love Is a Battlefield"
Chart (1983)	Position
US Cash Box Top 100 Singles	43

1984 year-end chart performance for "Love Is a Battlefield"
Chart (1984)	Position
Australia (Kent Music Report)	11
Belgium (Ultratop 50 Flanders)	7
Canada Top Singles (RPM)	71
Netherlands (Dutch Top 40)	2
Netherlands (Single Top 100)	7
US Billboard Hot 100	57
West Germany (Official German Charts)	20

== Certifications ==
Certifications for "Love Is a Battlefield"
Region	Certification	Certified units/sales
Canada (Music Canada)	Gold	50,000^{^}
United Kingdom (BPI)	Silver	200,000^{‡}
United States (RIAA)	Platinum	1,000,000^{^}
^{^} Shipments figures based on certification alone.^{‡} Sales+streaming figures based on certification alone.

== Cover versions ==
- In 1982, Chris Norman performed the song before Pat Benatar on an album entitled Rock away your teardrops.
- Co-songwriter of the song, Holly Knight recorded her own version for her 1989 debut solo album, Holly Knight.
- In 2007, Jann Arden released a cover of the song for her album Uncover Me.
- In 2008, the Amity Affliction released a cover of the song for their album Severed Ties.
- In 2013, a cover recorded by Sara Skinner was released which was featured in the eighth episode of the first season of Dynasty, a reboot of the 1980s soap opera of the same name.
- In 2014, Chris Colfer as Kurt Hummel and Darren Criss as Blaine Anderson covered the song in the episode "Tested" during the fifth season of Glee.
- In 2014, Wrongchilde featuring White Sea released a version of the song. Wrongchilde is the solo project of Mat Devine from Kill Hannah.
- In 2019, Luke Evans covered the song as part of his debut album At Last and also released it as his debut single.
- In 2023, Peyton Elizabeth Lee and Milo Manheim covered the song for the Romantic comedy television film entitled Prom Pact.

== See also ==
- List of number-one singles in Australia during the 1980s
- BRT Top 30 number-one hits of 1984
- List of Dutch Top 40 number-one singles of 1984
- List of Billboard Mainstream Rock number-one songs of the 1980s
