= Wake Up the Sleepers =

Studio album by Kill Hannah
- Released: September 29, 2009
- Genres: Post-punk revival, dance-punk, alternative rock
- Label: Original Signal Recordings/Universal Motown Records

Kill Hannah chronology
| Until There's Nothing Left of Us (2006) | Wake Up the Sleepers (2009) |

Professional ratings
Review scores
| Source | Rating |
|---|---|
| The Tune | 3/5 stars |

Wake Up the Sleepers is the sixth and final studio album by American alternative rock band Kill Hannah. It was released on September 29, 2009. On September 22, 2009, AbsolutePunk.net hosted the first online streaming of the album in its entirety. It also marks a return to an independent label by the band after signing to Atlantic Records for 2003's For Never & Ever and 2006's Until There's Nothing Left of Us.

== Track listing ==
All songs written by Mat Devine, except where noted.

1. "Radio" – 3:42
2. "Snowblinded" – 3:36 (featuring Benji Madden of Good Charlotte)
3. "New York City Speed" – 3:40
4. "Living in Misery" – 4:06 (featuring Amanda Palmer of The Dresden Dolls)
5. "Strobe Lights" – 4:28
6. "Why I Have My Grandma's Sad Eyes" – 4:56
7. "Tokyo (Dance in the Dust)" – 3:50
8. "Mouth to Mouth" – 5:00 (featuring Chibi of The Birthday Massacre)
9. "Vultures (Be There for Me)" – 4:34
10. "Escape Artistry" – 3:51
11. "Acid Rain" – 3:40
12. "Laika" (Devine, Dan Wiese) – 4:14
13. "Promise Me" – 2:52 (featuring Matt Skiba of Alkaline Trio)
14. "Welcome to Chicago" – 3:07 (Killhannah.com bonus track)
- Wake Up the Sleepers was originally a 5-track EP before getting signed.
- The working title for the album was Antarctica.
- "New York City Speed" and "Welcome to Chicago" are re-recorded older songs.
