= Here Are the Young Moderns =

Studio album by Kill Hannah
- Released: January 9, 1998
- Genre: Alternative rock, dream pop, shoegaze, electronica
- Length: 43:10

Kill Hannah chronology
Here Are the Young Moderns (1998)	American Jet Set (1999)

Here Are the Young Moderns, released on January 9, 1998, was Kill Hannah's debut album under their current name, and has been out of print for some time. After a few early releases as the band was forming and finding its footing, Greg Corner joined the band as bassist and they released Here Are The Young Moderns followed the next year by American Jet Set. These releases grew their name recognition in the Chicago music scene.

== Track listing ==
1. "Stunt Pilots" – 3:48
2. "Hyperactive" – 4:35
3. "Get Famous" – 5:27
4. "Nerve Gas" – 3:47
5. "Hummingbirds the Size of Bullets" – 3:42
6. "Love Sick" – 3:50
7. "Sleeping Like Electric Eels" – 2:50
8. "Kill Hannah" – 4:04
9. "Chloroform (Slow Reaction)" – 11:07 (5:32)
  - "Toy Soldier (For Never and Ever)" at 6:58 to 11:07 (hidden track)
- Tracks 1, 3, and 9 were recorded/produced by Garrett Hammond, Chicago.
- Tracks 4 and 6 were recorded by Don Bodin at Studio Underwater, Chicago.
- Tracks 5, 7, and 8 were recorded by Chad Steinhardt at Trackwork Orange Studios.
- Track 7 was produced by Mike Thrasher and Matt Westfield.

== Recording band ==
- James Connelly – drums
- Greg Corner – bass
- Matthew Devine – guitars, vocals
- Kerry Finerty – guitars, vocals
