= Walk This Way (album) =

Studio album by The White Tie Affair
- Released: April 22, 2008
- Studio: Annetenna Studios (Burbank, California)
- Genres: Dance-rock; pop; neon pop punk
- Length: 35:19
- Labels: Epic; Slightly Dangerous; Sony
- Producers: Matt Mahaffey; Jeff Turzo

Singles from Walk This Way
- 1. "Allow Me to Introduce Myself... Mr. Right" Released: 2007; 2. "Candle (Sick and Tired)" Released: November 18, 2008; 3. "The Letdown" Released: May 12, 2009

Walk This Way is the only studio album released by the White Tie Affair. It was released on April 22, 2008, via Epic Records, Slightly Dangerous and Sony BMG. The album contains the singles "Allow Me to Introduce Myself...Mr. Right", "Candle (Sick and Tired)" and "The Letdown". Produced by the collaborative team behind Wired All Wrong, Matt Mahaffey and Jeff Turzo, Walk This Way was recorded at Annetenna Studios in Burbank, California. The album peaked at number 168 on the Billboard 200.

== Background and recording ==
The White Tie Affair was formed in the summer of 2006, when singer Chris Wallace and guitarist Sean Patwell wrote their first song titled "Mr. Right". After posting the song on MySpace on October 31, 2006, the track began garnering multiple hits. The song also gained the attention of Epic Records, who signed the band in 2007. Keyboardist Ryan McLain and drummer Tim McLaughlin joined The White Tie Affair to complete the band's line-up.

The album was recorded at Annetenna Studios in Burbank, California, in the fall of 2007. Produced by Matt Mahaffey and Jeff Turzo, the band stated the reason the duo was chosen because they "understood the vision Wallace and Patwell had" for the record. Patwell handled programming on the album.

== Composition ==
The album's sound is described as dance-rock, pop and neon pop punk. Wallace said the songs were written about his life situations and "fantasies" about how life could be. The tracks "The Letdown", "The Enemy" and "Scene Change" features an electronic and techno sound, while "Candle (Sick and Tired)" and "If I Fall" emphasizes a rock guitar-driven chorus.

== Promotion ==
In February and March, the band went on tour with Secondhand Serenade, Making April and Automatic Loveletter. In July and August, the band went on tour alongside Innerpartysystem, Kill Hannah and the Medic Droid. In October and November, the band went on tour alongside the Higher, Just Surrender and the Morning Of. As well as this they served as the opening act for Lady Gaga's The Fame Ball Tour. Between late June and late August, the band performed on the Warped Tour. The band performed at various Six Flags locations as part of the mtvU VMA Tour. They appeared at The Bamboozle festival in May 2009, and performed on the Warped Tour between June and August 2009.

== Singles ==
"Allow Me to Introduce Myself... Mr. Right" was released in 2007, as the lead single from the album. A music video for the song premiered via MTV on June 5, 2008. "Candle (Sick and Tired)" was released on November 18, 2008, as the second single from the album. The song peaked at number 57 on the Billboard Hot 100. The music video made its debut on No Good TV, an internet TV website. "The Letdown" was released on May 12, 2009, as the third and final single from the album. On July 29, the music video for "Take It Home" premiered on Fuse.tv.

== Critical reception ==
Professional ratings
Review scores
Source	Rating
Absolutepunk.net	67%
AllMusic	3/5 stars
Melodic	3.5/5 stars

Walk This Way was met with positive reviews from music critics, many drawing comparisons to Fall Out Boy, Maroon 5 and Hellogoodbye. Matt Collar of AllMusic wrote on the album, stating, "Helping White Tie Affair out of this pigeonhole is a playful batch of catchy tunes that are expertly crafted with just the right amount of retro-synth, ersatz glam guitar, and pulsating dance grooves to make the band ready-made poster boys for the college club scene." He also said their sound "will draw quick and easy comparisons to Justin Timberlake and Fall Out Boy for their ability to mix sexy, club-ready workouts with more rawk-oriented, emo-power ballads." Kaj Roth of Melodic remarked, "you will find The White Tie Affair's dance-able rock somewhere between Fall Out Boy and Hellogoodbye. 10 songs with a running time of 35 minutes might seem a bit short but you can always take it from the beginning because as party music, Walk This Way will be a huge success." Alex Young of Consequence.net praised guitarist Sean Patwell's programming, writing, "his overall musical structures help to create vibrant, moody, tunnel vision-like atmospheres that take hold of your ears and never let them go."

== Track listing ==
Standard edition
No.	Title	Length
1.	"Allow Me to Introduce Myself...Mr. Right"	2:59
2.	"The Letdown"	3:39
3.	"Candle (Sick and Tired)"	3:50
4.	"Scene Change"	3:35
5.	"Watching You"	3:23
6.	"The Enemy"	2:50
7.	"Take It Home"	3:20
8.	"Price of Company"	3:42
9.	"If I Fall"	3:36
10.	"The Way Down"	4:25
Total length:		35:19

Advanced CD edition
No.	Title	Length
10.	"Tell Me What You Want"	4:14
11.	"The Way Down"	4:25
12.	"Climbing Up The Wall" (bonus track)	3:09

== Personnel ==
Credits retrieved from album's liner notes.

The White Tie Affair

- Chris Wallace – vocals
- Sean Patwell – guitar, programming
- Ryan McLain – keyboard
- Tim McLaughlin – drums

Additional musicians

- Sean Gould – guitar (7)

Production

- Matt Mahaffey – producer (1–6, 8–10)
- Jeff Turzo – producer (1–6, 8–10)
- S*A*M and Sluggo – producer (7)
- Chris Lord-Alge – mixing (1–2)
- Eric Rosse – mixing (3–10)
- Keith Armstrong – mixing assistant (1–2)
- Brian Gardner – mastering
- Jesse Owen Astin – editing (1–6, 8–10)

== Charts ==
Chart performance for Walk This Way
Chart (2008)	Peak position
US Billboard 200	168
US Heatseekers Albums (Billboard)	4

== Release history ==
Release history and formats for Walk This Way
Region	Date	Format	Label	Ref.
Various	April 22, 2008	CD; digital download	Epic; Slightly Dangerous; Sony	
Malaysia	April 22, 2008	CD	Epic; Slightly Dangerous; Sony	
