= Remember When (Push Rewind) =

Single by Chris Wallace

from the album Push Rewind
- Released: June 12, 2012
- Recorded: 2012
- Genre: Pop rock
- Length: 3:13
- Label: ThinkSay
- Songwriters: Chris Wallace, Matt Radosevich
- Producer: Radosevich

Chris Wallace singles chronology
"Remember When (Push Rewind)" (2012)	"Keep Me Crazy" (2013)

"Remember When (Push Rewind)" is a song by American recording artist Chris Wallace, taken from his debut studio album, Push Rewind (2013). It was released as the album's lead single on June 12, 2012. Written by Chris Wallace and Matt Radosevich, the song peaked at number two on the US Bubbling Under Hot 100 chart, an extension of the Billboard Hot 100.

== Background ==
Prior to his solo recording, Wallace was the frontman of The White Tie Affair, a Chicago-based pop-punk band. They toured with Lady Gaga and reached number 57 on the US Billboard Hot 100 chart with their single "Candle (Sick and Tired)", but management changes within their label prevented the group from releasing a follow-up album, and they were released from their contract. Wallace, who had received little money from the band's success, moved back in with his parents, before relocating to San Diego and signing with an independent record label.

In summer 2012, The White Tie Affair publicly announced that they were disbanding. Wallace worried that he would lose momentum if he waited for a long time before releasing solo material, so he released "Remember When" within a month of the band's breakup.

== Composition ==
The song is about looking back and wanting to relive one's past. Wallace's inspiration for the song was an ex-girlfriend who broke up with him after his band began experiencing success. In an interview with USA Today, he said that he hadn't spoken with the woman who inspired the song in three or four years, and that all he knew was that she was now married with a child.

The song's lyrics are characterized by an optimistic tone, focusing on the positive aspects of the relationship, with the first verse including the lyrics "As my future got bright, we started losing light, and I couldn't see that you were the one". He told USA Today that he considers the song to be a "celebration of that relationship, like 'remember when everything was amazing' and questioning why we ever said goodbye". In an interview with Beatweek, he elaborated that the underlying message of the song is positive in that "Even if things don’t work out and I can't change them, I'm still glad it happened. And the worst case scenario is that you learn a lesson." Wallace played every instrument on the song, as well as co-producing it.

== Reception ==
=== Critical ===
MTV has said that, “critics are going so far as to call him the male Katy Perry, a compliment if we ever heard one. Actually, we totally agree!” and called him a "one man dance party". iTunes listed the song among the best songs of 2012.

=== Commercial ===
The song entered at number 40 on the US Pop Airplay chart dated September 29, 2012, before attaining a peak position of number 25 on the chart dated March 2, 2013. It ultimately spent 22 weeks within the top 40, as well as four weeks on the Mainstream Top 40 Recurrents chart. On the chart dated March 16, 2013, it peaked at number two on the Bubbling Under Hot 100 Singles chart, an extension of the Billboard Hot 100. The song was regarded as more commercially successful than Wallace's work as part of The White Tie Affair.

== Live performances ==
Wallace performed the song on VH1's Big Morning Buzz Live on November 13, 2012. It was also his national television debut. On January 23, 2013, he performed the song, along with "Keep Me Crazy", on Jimmy Kimmel Live!. On February 20, 2013, he performed the song on Live! with Kelly and Michael.

== Music video ==
The music video for the song was released on June 20, 2012. The music video was directed and produced by Justin Baldoni. In the music video, Wallace is performing at a house party. The story shows the aftermath of the party and Chris pushes rewind and tries to change the past to win back his ex-girlfriend. Much of the video includes footage played backwards. As of February 2013, the video had 1.27 million views on YouTube.

== Track listing ==
Digital download
No.	Title	Length
1.	"Remember When (Push Rewind)"	3:13

== Charts ==
Chart performance for "Remember When (Push Rewind)"
Chart (2012–13)	Peak position
US Bubbling Under Hot 100 (Billboard)	2
US Heatseekers Songs (Billboard)	13
US Pop Airplay (Billboard)	25

== Release history ==
Release dates and formats for "Remember When (Push Rewind)"
Region	Date	Format	Label(s)	Ref.
Various	June 12, 2012	Digital download; streaming	ThinkSay	
United States	July 10, 2012	Mainstream airplay	ThinkSay	
