= Chris Wallace (musician) =

American singer-songwriter

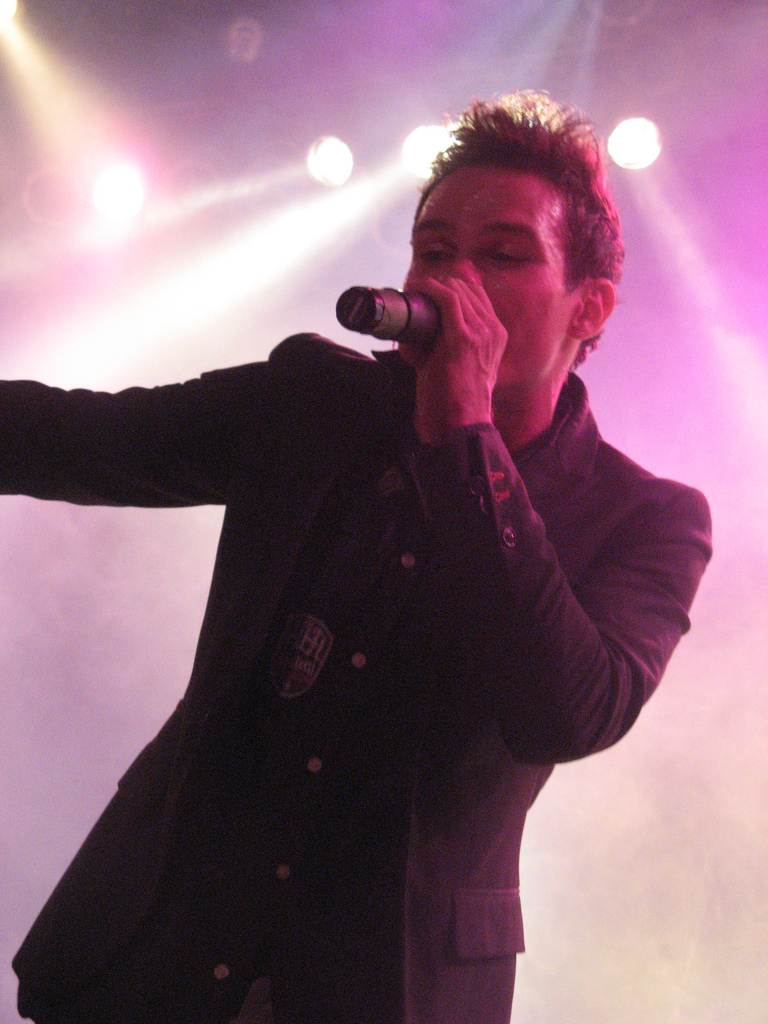
- Chris Wallace performing with The White Tie Affair at the Chicago House of Blues in November 2009

Background information
- Born: Christopher Alan Wallace; 1986 or 1987 (age 39–40)
- Origin: Hebron, Indiana, United States
- Genres: Pop; pop rock; R&B
- Occupations: Musician, vocalist, songwriter, producer
- Years active: 2006 – present
- Label: ThinkSay Records (2012–2015)
- Formerly of: The White Tie Affair

Christopher Alan Wallace (born 1986 or 1987) is an American singer, songwriter, and producer. He was prominently known as the former lead vocalist and front man of the American pop rock band The White Tie Affair. As a solo artist, Wallace has released one album, Push Rewind in 2012, via ThinkSay Records. His debut single "Remember When (Push Rewind)" was released in June 2012, and reached the Billboard Bubbling Under Hot 100 chart. In 2016, Wallace signed a songwriting contract with Pulse Music Group. Since then, he has released eleven singles, independently.

== Career ==
=== Early life and The White Tie Affair ===
Chris Wallace was born and raised in Hebron, Indiana. After learning how to play the guitar, he joined several local bands as a vocalist. He was in the band A Perfect Gentleman, before he co-founded The White Tie Affair in the summer of 2006, along with Sean Patwell. After signing with Epic Records/Slightly Dangerous in 2007, they released their debut album Walk This Way, the following year. The album spawned the singles "Allow Me to Introduce Myself... Mr. Right" and "Candle (Sick and Tired)". Though the band was expected to release a second album, they broke up in 2012, when Wallace embarked on a solo career.

=== Solo ===
On July 10, 2012, Wallace released his first solo single, "Remember When (Push Rewind)", a month after The White Tie Affair broke up. The song has appeared on several major pop radio stations. His music video for the single premiered on MTV Buzzworthy. The song is about looking back and wanting to relive your past. He said in an interview, that the underlying message of the song is positive in that "Even if things don’t work out and I can’t change them, I’m still glad it happened. And the worst case scenario is that you learn a lesson.”

On August 23, 2012, Chris tweeted that his first solo album, Push Rewind, would be available on iTunes on September 4. On September 4, 2012, his debut solo album was released via ThinkSay Records. In 2020, Chris independently released 8 singles including "Daydreaming" which had a moment of virality on TikTok. With the release of the song "Stumble" in spring 2026, Chris seems to be working on a full album to be released in the fall.

== Discography ==
=== Albums ===
List of studio albums, with selected chart positions and sales figures
Title	Album details	Peak chart positions	Sales
Title	Album details	US Heat.	Sales
Push Rewind	Released: September 4, 2012; Label: ThinkSay Records; Format: CD, digital download	17	US: 1,000

=== Extended plays ===
List of extended plays with release details
Title	EP details
Hits Like a Hurricane	Released: January 14, 2014; Label: ThinkSay Records; Format: Digital download

=== Singles ===
List of singles by title, year and peak chart positions, and album
Title	Year	Peak chart positions			Album
Title	Year	US	US Pop	US Heat	Album
"Remember When (Push Rewind)"	2012	102	25	13	Push Rewind
"Keep Me Crazy"	2013	—	33	—	Push Rewind
"Insecurities"	2020	—	—	—	Non-album singles
"Stay Home"	2020	—	—	—	Non-album singles
"Let Me Love You"	2020	—	—	—	Non-album singles
"Elysian Park"	2020	—	—	—	Non-album singles
"Are You Happy?"	2020	—	—	—	Non-album singles
"Daydreaming"	2020	—	—	—	Non-album singles
"Indiana (No More)"	2020	—	—	—	Non-album singles
"Close to God" (with Jez Dior)	2024	—	—	—	Non-album singles
"Stumble"	2026	—	—	—	Non-album singles
"Mazda (Take a Shot)"	2026	—	—	—	Non-album singles
"Let Your Hair Down"	2026	—	—	—	Non-album singles
"—" denotes releases that did not chart.

== Select songwriting/production discography ==
Year	Artist	Album	Song	Certification	Chart performance
2026	Chris Wallace	TBD	"Stumble"		
2026	Chris Wallace	TBD	"Mazda (Take a Shot)"		
2026	Chris Wallace	TBD	"Let Your Hair Down"		
2024	BoyNextDoor	19.99 (EP)	"Nice Guy" (English version)	Album: Gold - Japan (RIAJ), 3× Platinum - South Korea (KMCA)	#1 US World Albums (Billboard)
2023	BoyNextDoor	How? (EP)	"Earth, Wind & Fire" (English version)"	Album: 2× Platinum - South Korea (KMCA)	#3 US World Albums (Billboard)
2021	Tinashe	333	"Last Call"		
2020	Chris Wallace	The 2020 singles project	"Insecurities"		
2020	Chris Wallace	The 2020 singles project	"Stay Home"		
2020	Chris Wallace	The 2020 singles project	"Let Me Love You"		
2020	Chris Wallace	The 2020 singles project	"Elysian Park"		
2020	Chris Wallace	The 2020 singles project	"Are You Happy?"		
2020	Chris Wallace	The 2020 singles project	"Daydreaming"		
2020	Chris Wallace	The 2020 singles project	"Indiana (No More)"		
2020	Chris Wallace	The 2020 singles project	"Seasons (w/The White Tie Affair)"		
2020	Royalties (TV series)	Royalties soundtrack	"Mighty As Kong"		
2020	Royalties (TV series)	Royalties soundtrack	"Also You"		
2020	New Hope Club	New Hope Club	"Medicine"		
2019	Uverworld	Unser	"Making it Drive"	Gold - Japan (RIAJ)	
2019	Uverworld	Unser	"EDEN e"	Gold - Japan (RIAJ)	
2019	Reik ft. Manuel Turizo	Ahora	"Aleluya"	ALBUM: 4× Platinum (Latin RIAA), 2× Platinum+Gold - Mexico (AMPROFON) SINGLE: Platinum (Latin RIAA), 3× Platinum - Mexico (AMPROFON)	
2018	CNCO ft. Meghan Trainor & Sean Paul	Hey DJ (Remix)	"Hey DJ (Remix)"	SINGLE: Gold - Brazil (Pro-Música Brasil), Platinum - France (SNEP), Platinum - Italy (FIMI), 2× Platinum - Poland (ZPAV), Platinum - Portugal (AFP), Gold - Spain (PROMUSICAE)	
2018	Sebastián Yatra ft. Isabela Moner	No Hay Nadie Más (My Only One) (single)	"No Hay Nadie Más (My Only One)"	SINGLE: Gold - Brazil (Pro-Música Brasil)	
2018	Jukebox the Ghost	Off to the Races	"Time and I"		
2018	Jukebox the Ghost	Off to the Races	"Fred Astaire"		
2018	Jukebox the Ghost	Off to the Races	"Colorful"		
2018	Dillon Francis ft. Lao Ra	Wut Wut	"White Boi"		
2017	Sheppard	Watching the Sky	"Coming Home"	2× Platinum - Australia (ARIA), Gold - Netherlands (NVPI)	#1 Australian Albums (ARIA) SINGLE: #1 Australian Independent (AIR)
2017	Lost Kings ft. Ally Brooke & ASAP Ferg	Look at Us Now (single)	"Look at Us Now"		
2017	The Vamps (with Martin Jensen)	Night & Day	"Middle of the Night"	ALBUM: Gold - United Kingdom (BPI), Gold - Singapore (RIAS) SINGLE: Silver - United Kingdom (BPI)	#1 UK Albums (OCC); #1 Scottish Albums (OCC)
2014	R5	Heart Made Up on You	"Easy Love"		
2013	The Summer Set	Legendary	"Happy For You"		
2012	Chris Wallace	Push Rewind	"Remember When (Push Rewind)"		
2012	Chris Wallace	Push Rewind	"Keep Me Crazy"		
2012	Chris Wallace	Push Rewind	"Hurricane"		
2012	Chris Wallace	Push Rewind	"Don't Mind If I Do"		
2012	Chris Wallace	Push Rewind	"Best Mistake"		
2012	Chris Wallace	Push Rewind	"I'll Be There"		
2012	Chris Wallace	Push Rewind	"Time Bomb (Walk Away)"		
2012	Chris Wallace	Push Rewind	"Invincible"		
2012	Chris Wallace	Push Rewind	"Ready To Fall"		
2012	Chris Wallace	Push Rewind	"Do It All Again"		
2011	Queensberry	Chapter 3	"Timeless"		
2010	The White Tie Affair	You Look Better When I'm Drunk (Single)	"You Look Better When I'm Drunk"		
2008	The White Tie Affair	Walk This Way	"Allow Me to Introduce Myself…Mr. Right"		
2008	The White Tie Affair	Walk This Way	"The Letdown"		
2008	The White Tie Affair	Walk This Way	"Candle (Sick and Tired)"		
2008	The White Tie Affair	Walk This Way	"Scene Change"		
2008	The White Tie Affair	Walk This Way	"Watching You"		
2008	The White Tie Affair	Walk This Way	"The Enemy"		
2008	The White Tie Affair	Walk This Way	"Take It Home"		
2008	The White Tie Affair	Walk This Way	"Price of Company"		
2008	The White Tie Affair	Walk This Way	"If I Fall"		
2008	The White Tie Affair	Walk This Way	"The Way Down"		

== Guest appearances ==
List of guest appearances, and other work done on tracks, with other performing artists, showing year released and album name.
Track	Year	Artist(s)	Contribution	Album
"Close to God"	2025	Jez Dior	Feature, Writer, Producer	untitled/tbd
"January Jones"	2010	Hoodie Allen	Feature	Pep Rally
