= Push Rewind =

Studio album by Chris Wallace
- Released: September 4, 2012
- Recorded: 2012
- Genres: Pop, pop rock
- Label: ThinkSay Records
- Producers: Brad Davidson & Ben Singer (exec.)

Singles from Push Rewind
- 1. "Remember When (Push Rewind)" Released: June 12, 2012; 2. "Keep Me Crazy" Released: April 22, 2013

Push Rewind is the debut solo album by American pop singer Chris Wallace. It was released digitally on September 4, 2012.

The album was taken off iTunes in late 2013 and was re-released on March 4, 2014.

== Background ==
After Wallace's previous band, The White Tie Affair broke up, he began working on a solo album.

On August 23, 2012, Wallace tweeted that his first solo album, Push Rewind, would be available on iTunes on September 4. On September 4, 2012, his debut solo album was released via ThinkSay Records.

== Release and promotion ==
=== Singles ===
"Remember When (Push Rewind)" was released as the lead single from the album on June 12, 2012. The song was available for free for the week of September 4, 2012, as iTunes' Single of the Week to help promote the album. The song reached number 2 on the Billboard Bubbling Under Hot 100.

"Keep Me Crazy" was announced as the second single from the album. It was originally released to mainstream pop radio on April 22, 2013 but it was re-released on July 30, 2013.

== Critical reception ==
Professional ratings
Review scores
Source	Rating
Melodic	1.5/5 stars

Johan Wippsson of Melodic wrote a negative review for the album, stating, "I must say that he has not developed his sound in the right direction [...] he moved towards a pure pop sound with clear club influences like a male version Katy Perry. Do enjoy pop in most forms, but this sterile and cold-produced dance pop does not work at all and think it's quite pointless to be honest."

== Track listing ==
Standard edition
No.	Title	Writer(s)	Producer(s)	Length
1.	"Remember When (Push Rewind)"	Chris Wallace, Matt Radosevich	Radosevich	3:17
2.	"Keep Me Crazy"	Wallace, Radosevich, Mick Coogan	Radosevich	3:03
3.	"Don't Mind If I Do"	Wallace, Radosevich, Coogan	Radosevich	3:20
4.	"Hurricane"	Wallace, Nick Bailey, Ryan Ogren, Radosevich	Radosevich	3:21
5.	"Best Mistake"	Wallace, Dan Book, Alexei Misoul	Book, Misoul	2:52
6.	"I'll Be There"	Wallace, Bailey, Ogren	Bailey, Ogren	3:26
7.	"Time Bomb (Walk Away)"	Wallace, Ogren, Radosevich	Radosevich	3:15
8.	"Invincible"	Wallace	Radosevich	3:08
9.	"Ready To Fall"	Wallace, Barrett Yeretsian	Wallace	3:01
10.	"Do It All Again"	Wallace, John Fields	Fields	3:41
Total length:				32:24

Deluxe edition
No.	Title	Writer(s)	Producer(s)	Length
11.	"Keep Me Crazy" (Acoustic Version)	Wallace, Radosevich, Coogan	Wallace	3:05

Re-release
No.	Title	Writer(s)	Producer(s)	Length
1.	"Remember When (Push Rewind)"	Chris Wallace, Matt Radosevich	Radosevich	3:17
2.	"Keep Me Crazy"	Wallace, Radosevich, Mick Coogan	Radosevich	3:03
3.	"Don't Mind If I Do"	Wallace, Radosevich, Coogan	Radosevich	3:20
4.	"Hurricane"	Wallace, Nick Bailey, Ryan Ogren, Radosevich	Radosevich	3:21
5.	"Best Mistake"	Wallace, Dan Book, Alexei Misoul	Book, Misoul	2:52
6.	"I'll Be There"	Wallace, Bailey, Ogren	Bailey, Ogren	3:26
7.	"Time Bomb (Walk Away)"	Wallace, Ogren, Radosevich	Radosevich	3:15
8.	"Invincible"	Wallace	Radosevich	3:08
9.	"Ready To Fall"	Wallace, Barrett Yeretsian	Wallace	3:01
10.	"Do It All Again"	Wallace, John Fields	Fields	3:41
11.	"Keep Me Crazy" (Acoustic Version)	Wallace, Radosevich, Coogan	Wallace	3:05
12.	"Remember When (Push Rewind)" (Acoustic Version)	Wallace, Radosevich		3:29
13.	"Time Bomb (Walk Away)" (Acoustic Version)	Wallace, Ogren, Radosevich		3:09

== Charts ==
Chart performance for Push Rewind
Chart (2012)	Peak position
US Heatseekers Albums (Billboard)	17

== Release history ==
Region	Date	Format	Label
United States	September 4, 2012	Digital download	ThinkSay Records
United States	March 4, 2014	CD, digital download	Universal
