= Don Bodin =

American composer

- Genres: Electronic; Experimental; Orchestral; Hybrid score
- Occupations: Composer; producer; songwriter
- Years active: 2002–present
- Awards: Best Instrumental EP, Independent Music Awards (2015); Best Commercial Score, Hollywood Music in Media Awards (2013)
- Website: donbodin.com

Don Bodin is a music composer, producer and songwriter living in Los Angeles. Bodin has composed music for hundreds of promotional films and commercial advertisements including the Ready Player One 'Dreamer' Trailer and pomrotional campaign, music for Toyota of Europe and Yamaha Motors Sprint Business as well as several independent films including creating original music for Director Damian Chapa's independent film Fuego starring David Carradine

In addition to his work creating music for media Bodin has released 15 albums of instrumental music since 2006.

Bodin's latest release, Obscura, is an experimental album created by applying sampling and synthesis techniques from original recording session which included strings sessions. recorded at Abbey Road Studios

Bodin's 2008 release The Radioactive Werewolf and other Tales from the Southwest which album contains performances by Alain Whyte, Chris Schleyer and Elif Savas.

Prior to composing music for film and television, he ran the now defunct Independent label Baby Factory and produced alternative rock band Kill Hannah's debut album Humming Birds The Size of Bullets as well as tracks from the bands American Jet Set album.

== Awards and recognition ==
Bodin has received 6 Independent Music Award Nominations and 1 Win. In 2018 Bodin's 'Obscura' EP was nominated in the category of 'Best Electronica/Dance' with the single 'Eleven Point Seven Five' from the same album nominated for 'Best Instrumental Song' In 2014 Bodin's EP 'Chronomicon" was nominated for the Independent Music Award for Best Instrumental Song and one for Best Instrumental EP, and 2 Independent Music Award Nominations for music from his 2014 EP release "'Awake In Exile". One nomination for Best Instrumental Song and one for Best Instrumental EP. Don Bodin's EP release "Chronomicon" won the award for "Best Instrumental EP" at the 2015 14th Annual Independent Music Awards.

In November 2013 Bodin received the Hollywood Music In Media Award for Best Commercial Score.

In addition Bodin has been nominated for 2 Hollywood Music in Media Awards for Best Score for a Commercial Advertisement and nominated 1 time for Best Song For A Commercial Advertisement.

== Discography ==
To date, Bodin has released 14 albums:

1. "Obscura"
2. "Daemonology"
3. "Vigil"
4. "Awake in Exile"
5. "Lexicon"
6. "Chronomicon"
7. "The Sideshow Sessions"
8. "This One's Gonna Leave Out the Vocals"
9. "This One's Gonna Leave A Mark"
10. "The Ballad of Big Shot Volume 1"
11. "The Radioactive Werewolf and other tales from the Southwest"
12. "Silentium est Alurum"
13. "Like Rabbits"
14. "Greed Lust And Cloning"
