= Egg hunt (disambiguation) =

Egg hunt is a game of collecting hidden eggs during Easter.

Egg hunt may also refer to:

- Egg Hunt, a musical project by Ian MacKaye and Jeff Nelson
- "Egg Hunt", an episode of Dora the Explorer TV series
- The Egg Hunt, a 1940 Columbia Color Rhapsody animated film
- The Egg Hunt, a 2009 album by Making April
