= Garrett Hammond =

American drummer

- Origin: United States
- Instrument: Drums
- Years active: 1997–2006
- Labels: Atlantic Records
- Website: www.killhannah.com

Garret Hammond was the drummer of the Chicago-based alternative rock bands Kill Hannah and Prick.

== Career ==
Hammond drummed for the band Prick, which was signed to Nothing Records owned by Nine Inch Nails' Trent Reznor.

Hammond drummed on select tracks of Kill Hannah's album American Jet Set and eventually joined the band full-time. He remained in the band through the recording of their second major label album released on Atlantic Records, Until There's Nothing Left of Us. He left the band for personal reasons, but still performs periodically with the band, including full-time during their 2011 Euro Tour.

Hammond recorded/engineered and produced Chicago band Out For Hours first full-length album titled Save Today Tomorrow.

Hammond now is currently recording with Jonny Radtke (ex-Kill Hannah guitarist) in Radtke's new solo project, Polar Moon. He also records with David Martorana at FAT RECORDING STUDIO in Illinois and does some tours with Kill Hannah.
