= Until There's Nothing Left of Us =

Studio album by Kill Hannah
- Released: August 1, 2006
- Recorded: Groovemaster Studios, (Chicago, IL); Ocean Studios, (Burbank, CA); Sage and Sound, (Hollywood, CA)
- Genres: Alternative rock, dance-punk, post-punk revival
- Length: 43:17 (Standard version); 53:14 (UK version)
- Labels: Atlantic (U.S.); Roadrunner (UK)
- Producer: Johnny K

Kill Hannah chronology
For Never & Ever (2003)	Until There's Nothing Left of Us (2006)	Wake Up the Sleepers (2009)

Singles from Until There's Nothing Left of Us
- 1. "Lips Like Morphine" Released: 2006

Professional ratings
Review scores
Source	Rating
Allmusic	link

Until There's Nothing Left of Us is Kill Hannah's fifth full-length studio album and their second album on major label, Atlantic Records. The first single from the album was "Lips Like Morphine", released before the album came out. The video is shot in black and white and set in an 'industrial wasteland'. The second single was "Crazy Angel" as announced on July 26, 2006 at the Fan Appreciation Show.

== Track listing ==
=== Standard version ===
All songs written by Mat Devine, except where noted

No.	Title	Writer(s)	Length
1.	"(Life in the Arctic)"		2:36
2.	"Believer"		3:46
3.	"Lips Like Morphine"		3:44
4.	"Black Poison Blood"		4:21
5.	"Love You to Death"		3:18
6.	"The Collapse"		3:12
7.	"Statues Without Eyes"	Devine, Jonathan Radtke	3:28
8.	"Crazy Angel"		3:49
9.	"Under the Milky Way" (The Church cover)	Steve Kilbey, Karin Jansson	3:58
10.	"Songs That Saved My Life"	Devine, Radtke	3:53
11.	"Scream"		4:32
12.	"(Sleep Tight)"		2:40

Online bonus tracks
No.	Title	Length
13.	"Last Night Here"	4:47
14.	"The Chase"	3:46

=== International version ===
No.	Title	Length
1.	"(Sleep Tight)"	2:40
2.	"Believer"	3:46
3.	"Lips Like Morphine"	3:44
4.	"Boys & Girls (Alternate Mix)"	3:13
5.	"Songs That Saved My Life"	3:53
6.	"Crazy Angel"	3:49
7.	"10 More Minutes With You (Alternate Mix)"	3:44
8.	"The Collapse"	3:12
9.	"Love You to Death"	3:18
10.	"Kennedy"	3:47
11.	"Black Poison Blood"	4:21
12.	"(Life in the Arctic)"	2:36

International bonus tracks
No.	Title	Length
13.	"The Chase"	3:46
14.	"Nerve Gas (cowritten by Kerry Finerty,)"	3:49

== Personnel ==
=== Band ===
- Mat Devine – vocals, guitar
- Jonathan Radtke – guitar, backing vocals
- Dan Wiese – guitar, backing vocals
- Greg Corner – bass

=== Additional musicians ===
- Kerry Finerty - lead guitar/ backing vocals
- Garret Hammond – drums
- Matt Skaggs – synthesizers
- Juliette Beavan – vocals
- Sean Beavan – vocals

=== Production ===
- Johnny K – production, engineering, mixing
- Sean Beavan – production, engineering, mixing
- Chris Lord-Alge – mixing
- Tom Baker – mastering
- Ted Jensen – mastering

=== Design ===
- Eric Altenburger – photo composites
- Joseph Cultice – photography, cover art concept
- Alex Kirzhner – art direction, Design
- Cerise Leang – model
- Andrew Zaeh – art producer

== Chart performance ==
Chart (2006)	Peak position
US Billboard 200	178
US Top Heatseekers	8
