= Everybody's Lonely =

Single by Jukebox the Ghost

from the album Off to the Races
- Released: January 18, 2018
- Genre: Power pop; indie pop; pop rock
- Length: 3:06

Jukebox the Ghost singles chronology
"Hollywood" (2015)	"Everybody's Lonely" (2018)	"Jumpstarted" (2018)

Music video
- "Everybody's Lonely" on YouTube

"Everybody's Lonely" is the lead single from Jukebox the Ghost's fifth studio album, Off to the Races. The single was self-released on January 18, 2018.

Commercially, the track is the band's most successful single to date, being their first song to chart. The single reached number 22 on the Billboard Alternative Songs chart and number 26 on the Rock Airplay chart.

== Charts ==
Chart (2018)	Peak position
US Alternative Airplay (Billboard)	22
US Rock Airplay (Billboard)	26
