= For Never & Ever =

Studio album by Kill Hannah
- Released: October 14, 2003
- Recorded: Ocean Studios (Burbank, CA); Sage and Sound (Hollywood, CA)
- Genres: Alternative rock, dance-punk, post-punk revival
- Length: 42:08
- Label: Atlantic
- Producer: Sean Beavan

Kill Hannah chronology
American Jet Set (1999)	For Never & Ever (2003)	Until There's Nothing Left of Us (2006)

Singles from For Never & Ever
- 1. "Kennedy" Released: 2003; 2. "Boys and Girls" Released: 2008

For Never & Ever is Kill Hannah's major label debut album, released October 14, 2003. It features the single, "Kennedy". The album was mixed by Tim Palmer.

Professional ratings
Review scores
Source	Rating
Allmusic	Link

== Track listing ==
All songs written by Mat Devine.

1. "They Can't Save Us Now" – 3:36
2. "Kennedy" – 3:47
3. "10 More Minutes with You" – 3:44
4. "New Heart for Xmas" – 4:04
5. "Boys & Girls" – 3:13
6. "From Now On" – 3:03
7. "Raining All the Time" – 3:37
8. "Race the Dream" – 3:36
9. "Unwanted" – 3:27
10. "Is Anyone Here Alive?" – 3:38
11. "No One Dreams Anyway*" – 6:23

== Recording band ==
- Dan Wiese – guitars, pedals
- Johnny Radtke – guitars, synth
- Mat Devine – lead vocals, guitars, piano
- Greg Corner – bass
- Garret Hammond – drums, percussion

== Other songs ==
- "Big Shot"
  Released on the compilation album Bam Margera Presents: Viva La Bands; previously recorded in 2000 and released as a free download on the band's web site.
- "Goodnight, Goodbye"
  Released on the Lips Like Morphine EP.
- "Nerve Gas"
  Released on the UK version of Until There's Nothing Left of Us; previously recorded in 1997 and released on the Stunt Pilots EP and Here Are the Young Moderns; also recorded for 1999's American Jet Set.
