= Fuego (2007 film) =

- Directed by: Damian Chapa
- Written by: Damian Chapa; Carlton Holder
- Produced by: Damian Chapa
- Starring: Damian Chapa; David Carradine; Elena Talan
- Cinematography: Pierre Chemaly
- Edited by: Keita Ideno
- Music by: Gerald Marino additional score by Don Bodin song performed by AK von Malmborg
- Production company: Amadeus Pictures
- Distributed by: Romar Entertainment
- Release date: October 31, 2007
- Running time: 89 minutes
- Country: United States
- Language: English

Fuego is a 2007 action thriller directed by Damian Chapa and starring Damian Chapa, David Carradine, Elena Talan.

== Overview ==
An escaped Mexican prisoner, Julio, crosses paths with a secret agent named Lobo. Lobo changes Julio's name to Fuego and enlists him to rescue an ambassador's daughter taken hostage by a terrorist group.

== Cast ==
- Damian Chapa as Fuego / Julio
- David Carradine as Lobo
- Louise Prieto as Francesca

== Film locations ==
Filming took place in the United States, Europe and Ireland.
