= Cheers (Jukebox the Ghost album) =

Studio album by Jukebox the Ghost
- Released: May 27, 2022
- Genre: Power pop; indie pop; pop rock
- Length: 38:38

Jukebox the Ghost chronology
Off to the Races (2018)	Cheers (2022)	Phantasmagorical Vol. 1 (2025)

Singles from Cheers
- 1. "Cheers!" Released: September 8, 2021; 2. "Ramona" Released: December 10, 2021; 3. "Wasted" Released: March 11, 2022; 4. "Million Dollar Bills" Released: April 22, 2022; 5. "Hey Maude" Released: May 18, 2022

Cheers is the sixth studio album by American power pop band Jukebox the Ghost. The album was released through BMG on May 27, 2022.

== Background and release ==
After the release of the band's fifth album Off to the Races, they began a three-year songwriting process. During this time, Jukebox the Ghost also revisited unreleased songs and expanded them with further writing, totaling over 50 songs. The track "Hey Maude" came from this collection, originally being written in 2006 while the members were in college before recording a studio version for Cheers. The album's 13 tracks and around 12 unreleased tracks were recorded and produced in Brooklyn, New York over a six-month period during the COVID-19 pandemic.

This album contained five singles. Jukebox the Ghost released the lead single "Cheers!" on September 8, 2021, with an accompanying lyric video, and a music video on October 6, 2022. They also released singles "Ramona" on December 10, 2021, "Wasted" on March 11, 2022, "Million Dollar Bills" on April 22, 2022, and "Hey Maude" on May 18, 2022. While the track "Brass Band" was not a single, it received a music video featuring the P.K. Yonge marching band on March 28, 2023.

== Critical reception ==
Professional ratings
Review scores
Source	Rating
PopMatters	8/10 stars
The Soundboard	5/10 stars
Melodic Net	4/5 stars

The album received favorable to mixed reviews. The Washington Post wrote that the album had "timeless tunes, rich with glee and glamour, topped by catchy lyrics", while Prelude Press called the songs "fresh-sounding" and the album as a whole "rounded and perfectly planned out".

== Track listing ==
No.	Title	Length
1.	"Century In The Making (Intro)"	0:41
2.	"Hey Maude"	3:50
3.	"Wasted" (featuring Andrew McMahon)	3:36
4.	"Ramona"	2:49
5.	"Million Dollar Bills"	3:11
6.	"Us Against The World"	3:08
7.	"Brass Band"	3:06
8.	"The Machine (Intro)"	1:35
9.	"Everybody Panic"	4:10
10.	"Move Along"	2:50
11.	"Raise A Glass (Interlude)"	1:57
12.	"How The World Began"	4:18
13.	"Cheers!"	3:20
Total length:		38:38

=== Cheers (Deluxe Version) ===
A deluxe version of Cheers was released on April 7, 2023. I Got A Girl was released as a single on November 17, 2022.

No.	Title	Length
1.	"Century In The Making (Intro)"	0:41
2.	"Hey Maude"	3:50
3.	"Wasted" (featuring Andrew McMahon)	3:36
4.	"Ramona"	2:49
5.	"Million Dollar Bills"	3:11
6.	"I Got A Girl"	2:14
7.	"Us Against The World"	3:08
8.	"Brass Band"	3:06
9.	"The Machine (Intro)"	1:35
10.	"Everybody Panic"	4:10
11.	"Move Along"	2:50
12.	"Raise A Glass (Interlude)"	1:57
13.	"How The World Began"	4:18
14.	"Cheers!"	3:20
15.	"Costume"	2:51
16.	"Wasted - Piano Instrumental"	4:02
17.	"Ramona - Piano Instrumental"	2:51
18.	"Us Against The World - Piano Instrumental"	3:37
19.	"Brass Band - Piano Instrumental"	3:37
Total length:		57:52

== Personnel ==
Credits adapted from deluxe version on Tidal.

Jukebox the Ghost

- Ben Thornewill – lead vocals (1–3, 5, 6, 8–15), piano, composer (all tracks), production (1, 2, 4–19), mastering engineer (4, 16–19)
- Tommy Siegel – vocals (1, 2, 4, 5, 7, 9, 10, 12–14), guitar (1–15), bass (6), composer (all tracks), production (1, 2, 4–19)
- Jesse Kristin – vocals (5, 12, 14), drums (1–15), composer (all tracks), production (1, 2, 4–19)

Additional personnel

- Andrew McMahon - lead vocals (3), composer (3, 16)
- Brian Phillips - composer (3, 16), production, mixing engineer (3)
- Keith Varon - composer (4, 7, 17, 18), production (7)
- Chris Wallace - composer, production (5)
- Jeremy Silver - composer, production (11)
- Tim Myers - composer, production (14)
- Joe LaPorta - mastering engineer (1–3, 5–15)
- Harry Burr - recording engineer (1, 2, 5–15)
- Luke Weber - trumpet (8)
