= Off to the Races (Jukebox the Ghost album) =

Studio album by Jukebox the Ghost
- Released: March 30, 2018
- Studio: Studio G (Brooklyn, New York)
- Genre: Power pop; indie pop; glam rock
- Length: 33:35
- Label: Self-released
- Producer: Chris Cubeta; Gary Attturio; CJ Baran; Peter Thomas; Chris Wallace

Jukebox the Ghost chronology
Jukebox the Ghost (2014)	Off to the Races (2018)	Cheers (2022)

Singles from Off to the Races
- 1. "Everybody's Lonely" Released: January 18, 2018; 2. "Jumpstarted" Released: February 16, 2018; 3. "Fred Astaire" Released: March 15, 2018

Off to the Races is the fifth studio album by American power pop band Jukebox the Ghost. The album was self-released on March 30, 2018. It was mostly recorded at Studio G in Brooklyn and engineered, produced and mixed by Chris Cubeta and Gary Atturio, with two exceptions: "Everybody's Lonely" was produced by CJ Baran and Peter Thomas and "Fred Astaire" was produced by Chris Wallace.

The album contains the single "Everybody's Lonely", which was the band's first single to chart, reaching number 22 in the Billboard Alternative Songs chart.

== Critical reception ==
Professional ratings
Review scores
Source	Rating
AllMusic	4/5 stars
PopMatters	8/10 stars

James Christopher Monger of AllMusic critiqued that the album continued the band's "pop-tastic winning streak" with a collection of "meticulously crafted and radio-ready confections", highlighting the singles for capturing the "sweet spot between pop purity and rock pageantry." PopMatters contributor Chris Conaton wrote that "Off to the Races is a big creative success for Thornewill, Siegel, and Kristin, and it should please existing fans and possibly draw in new ones."

== Track listing ==
Off to the Races
No.	Title	Vocalist	Length
1.	"Jumpstarted"	Thornewill	4:22
2.	"Everybody's Lonely"	Thornewill	3:06
3.	"People Go Home"	Siegel	2:43
4.	"Fred Astaire"	Thornewill	3:39
5.	"Time and I"	Thornewill	3:00
6.	"Diane"	Siegel	2:49
7.	"See You Soon"	Thornewill	3:30
8.	"Boring"	Siegel	4:01
9.	"Simple As 1 2 3"	Thornewill	3:30
10.	"Colorful"	Thornewill	3:12
Total length:			33:35

== Personnel ==
Credits adapted from the album's inlay notes.

Jukebox the Ghost

- Ben Thornewill – pianos, keyboards, vocals
- Tommy Siegel – guitars, bass, vocals
- Jesse Kristin – drums, percussion, vocals

Production

- Chris Cubeta, Gary Atturio – producing, mixing, engineering
- CJ Baran, Peter Thomas – producing ("Everybody's Lonely")
- Chris Wallace – producing ("Fred Astaire")
- Robert Orton – mixing ("Everybody's Lonely", "Fred Astaire")

Artwork

- Shervin Lainez – band portraits
- Florencia Gutman – layout and design
- Jukebox the Ghost – art concept

== Charts ==
Chart (2018)	Peak position
US Heatseekers Albums (Billboard)	5
US Independent Albums (Billboard)	13
US Top Album Sales (Billboard)	79
