= Wrongchilde =

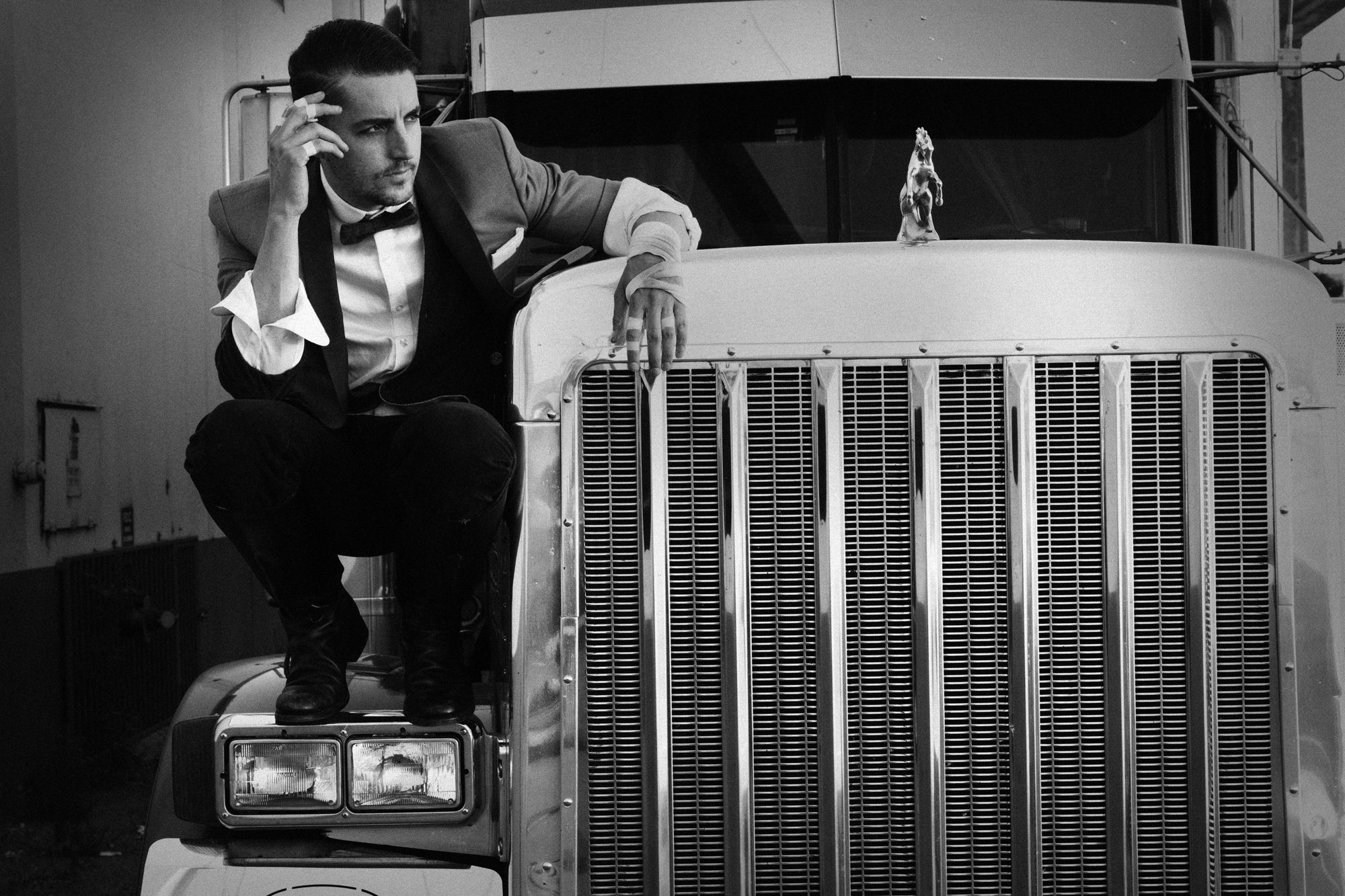
- Photo by Niko Sonnberger

Background information
- Origin: Los Angeles, California, United States
- Genres: Alternative rock, electronic rock
- Years active: 2013–present
- Members: Mat Devine
- Website: wrongchilde.com

Wrongchilde is the solo project of Mat Devine, lead singer of Kill Hannah. The project was started in 2013 and they released their first album Gold Blooded on August 19, 2014. The album was self-released through PledgeMusic.

== History ==
Wrongchilde started when Mat Devine moved to Los Angeles to work on the project and begin his first solo album Gold Blooded. The name came to him in a dream while he was in high school, and he began scratching it on books and things, not knowing why.

== Gold Blooded ==
Gold Blooded is Wrongchilde's first album, and was released on August 19, 2014. The album features duets with Gerard Way of My Chemical Romance, Morgan Kibby of White Sea and M83, and Sierra Kusterbeck of VersaEmerge.

The project was completely self-financed through PledgeMusic. Wrongchilde's first single, "Falling In Love Will Kill You", featuring Gerard Way received over 85k streams on SoundCloud in the first few weeks.

== Discography ==
Year	Title	Record label
2014	Gold Blooded	Self-released
