= Candle (Sick and Tired) =

Single by The White Tie Affair

from the album Walk This Way
- Released: November 18, 2008
- Recorded: 2008
- Genre: Neon pop; dance rock
- Length: 3:50
- Label: Epic
- Songwriters: Scott Cutler; Sean Patwell; Anne Preven; Chris Wallace
- Producers: Matt Mahaffey; Jeff Turzo

The White Tie Affair singles chronology
"Allow Me to Introduce Myself... Mr. Right" (2007)	"Candle (Sick and Tired)" (2008)	"The Letdown" (2009)

Music video
- "Candle (Sick And Tired)" on YouTube

"Candle (Sick and Tired)" is a song by American pop rock band the White Tie Affair. It was released on November 18, 2008, as the second single from their only studio album, Walk This Way. The video for the single has a guest appearance by the Glee star, Heather Morris, as well as cameos from the lonelygirl15 star Jessica Rose and the Good Charlotte guitarist Benji Madden.

The song peaked at number 57 on the Billboard Hot 100 and spent eight weeks on the chart. It also reached number three on the US Dance Club Songs chart.

== Composition ==
"Candle (Sick and Tired)" was written by Scott Cutler, Sean Patwell, Anne Preven and Chris Wallace, while production was handled by Matt Mahaffey and Jeff Turzo. The track is described as neon pop and dance rock, featuring a rock sounding and guitar-driven chorus.

== Chart performance ==
The song entered the Billboard Hot 100 at number 93, and peaked at number 57, spending eight weeks on the chart. It also peaked at number three on the Billboard Hot Dance Club Play and number 33 on the US Pop 100 chart.

== Music video ==
The first music video for "Candle (Sick and Tired)" was released on May 9, 2008, via MTV, and was directed by Spencer Nicholson. The video made its debut on Total Request Live on May 22. The band re-recorded another music video for the song with director Jon Watts and was released on January 13, 2009. The video later premiered via MTV on May 2. Shot in Los Angeles, this version of the video features a cameo appearance by Benji and Joel Madden of Good Charlotte, Stephanie Pratt and the female lead is played by lonelygirl15 star Jessica Lee Rose. The video also features relatives of some of the band members. The float scene in the video was inspired by the 1986 film Ferris Bueller's Day Off. According to Chris Wallace, the band had become friends with the Madden brothers and after recording a remix for Good Charlotte's Greatest Remixes release, the duo decided to support them by appearing in their video.

== Track listing ==
Digital download – remixes
No.	Title	Length
1.	"Candle (Sick and Tired)" (Johnny Vicious Club Mix)	8:08
2.	"Candle (Sick and Tired)" (Johnny Vicious Warehouse Vocal Mix)	7:50
3.	"Candle (Sick and Tired)" (Johnny Vicious Warehouse Dub)	6:49
4.	"Candle (Sick and Tired)" (Johnny Vicious Radio Edit)	4:09
5.	"Candle (Sick and Tired)" (Razor N Guido Club Mix)	7:29
6.	"Candle (Sick and Tired)" (Razor N Guido Dub)	7:39
7.	"Candle (Sick and Tired)" (Razor N Guido Radio Edit)	3:47

== Personnel ==
Credits for "Candle (Sick and Tired)" adapted from album's liner notes.

The White Tie Affair

- Chris Wallace – lead vocals
- Sean Patwell – guitar
- Tim McLaughlin – drums
- Ryan McLain – keyboards

Production

- Matt Mahaffey – producer
- Jeff Turzo – producer
- Chris Lord-Alge – mixing
- Eric Ivan Rosse – mixing
- Brian Gardner – mastering
- Jesse Owen Astin – editing

== Charts ==
Chart performance for "Candle (Sick and Tired)"
Chart (2009)	Peak position
US Billboard Hot 100	57
US Dance Club Songs (Billboard)	3
US Pop 100 (Billboard)	33

== Release history ==
Release dates and formats for "Candle (Sick and Tired)"
Region	Date	Format	Label(s)	Ref.
United States	November 18, 2008	Mainstream airplay	Epic	
