= Let Live & Let Ghosts =

Studio album by Jukebox the Ghost
- Released: April 22, 2008
- Genre: Power pop; indie pop; pop rock
- Length: 42:07
- Producer: UE Nastasi

Jukebox the Ghost chronology
Let Live & Let Ghosts (2008)	Everything Under the Sun (2010)

Singles from Let Live & Let Ghosts
- 1. "Hold It In" Released: 2008; 2. "Good Day" Released: 2008

Professional ratings
Review scores
Source	Rating
DCist	(favorable)
Sputnikmusic	3.5/5 stars
The Washington Post	(favorable)
Yorkshire Post	(mixed)
Consequence of Sound	A−

Let Live & Let Ghosts is the debut studio album by American power pop band Jukebox the Ghost. The album was self-released on April 22, 2008. The band promoted it with a supporting slot on Nightmare of You's US tour.

== Track listing ==
No.	Title	Vocalist	Length
1.	"Good Day"	Thornewill	4:14
2.	"Hold It In"	Thornewill	3:29
3.	"Beady Eyes on the Horizon"	Siegel	4:08
4.	"Under My Skin"	Thornewill	3:20
5.	"Miss Templeton's 7000th Dream"	Siegel	1:38
6.	"Static to the Heart"	Siegel	4:33
7.	"Victoria"	Thornewill	3:44
8.	"My Heart's the Same"	Thornewill	3:07
9.	"Lighting Myself on Fire"	Thornewill	3:48
10.	"Fire in the Sky"	Siegel	0:56
11.	"Where Are All the Scientists Now?"	Siegel	4:10
12.	"A Matter of Time"	Siegel	5:07
Total length:			42:07
