= Jukebox the Ghost (album) =

Studio album by Jukebox the Ghost
- Released: October 21, 2014
- Genre: Power pop; indie pop; pop rock
- Length: 36:48
- Label: Yep Roc

Jukebox the Ghost chronology
Safe Travels (2012)	Jukebox the Ghost (2014)	Off to the Races (2018)

Singles from Jukebox the Ghost
- 1. "The Great Unknown"; 2. "Postcard"; 3. "Hollywood"

Professional ratings
Review scores
Source	Rating
AllMusic	4/5 stars
PopMatters	5/10 stars

Jukebox the Ghost is the fourth studio album by American power pop band, Jukebox the Ghost. The album was released on October 21, 2014, by Yep Roc Records.

== Track listing ==
Jukebox the Ghost track listing
No.	Title	Vocalist	Length
1.	"Sound of a Broken Heart"	Thornewill	3:18
2.	"Made for Ending"	Siegel	3:03
3.	"Girl"	Thornewill	3:35
4.	"The Great Unknown"	Thornewill	3:00
5.	"Long Way Home"	Siegel/Thornewill	3:27
6.	"When the Nights Get Long"	Thornewill	3:27
7.	"The One"	Siegel	3:39
8.	"Hollywood"	Thornewill/Kristin	3:27
9.	"Postcard"	Thornewill	3:30
10.	"Undeniable You"	Thornewill	3:22
11.	"Show Me Where It Hurts"	Siegel	3:06
Total length:			36:48

== Reception ==
Writing for USA Today, Brian Mansfield wrote on "The Great Unknown", commenting that "robust piano chords and a chorus of voices lend a gospel-like buoyancy to this song about greeting life's challenges."

== Charts ==
Chart (2014)	Peak position
US Billboard 200	121
US Heatseekers Albums (Billboard)	3
US Independent Albums (Billboard)	22
US Top Alternative Albums (Billboard)	19
US Top Rock Albums (Billboard)	28
