= Safe Travels =

Studio album by Jukebox the Ghost
- Released: June 5, 2012
- Genre: Power pop; indie pop; pop rock
- Length: 47:02
- Label: Yep Roc
- Producer: Dan Romer

Jukebox the Ghost chronology
| Everything Under the Sun (2010) | Safe Travels (2012) | Jukebox the Ghost (2014) |

Singles from Safe Travels
- 1. "Somebody" Released: April 9, 2012; 2. "Oh, Emily" Released: April 13, 2012; 3. "A La La" Released: July 25, 2012

Safe Travels is the third studio album by American power pop band Jukebox the Ghost. The album was released on June 5, 2012 through Yep Roc Records. Produced by Dan Romer, the record spawned three singles: "Somebody", "Oh, Emily" and "A La La".

== Background ==
Guitarist Tommy Siegel said that Safe Travels' title is derived from the song of the same name by Red Hunter, creator of the folk band Peter and the Wolf, and it encapsulates the album's songs about "death and mortality in general and break-ups" in a "more positive light." Safe Travels was produced by Dan Romer, who Siegel felt was able to capture the band's dynamic on record. Pianist and co-vocalist Ben Thornewill also agreed with that sentiment: "Every guitar line, vocal line, synth, whatever, tone, pitch, everything was really carefully selected and carefully played. And that was the first time that we were able to do that".

== Critical reception ==
Professional ratings
Aggregate scores
| Source | Rating |
|---|---|
| Metacritic | 70/100 |
Review scores
| Source | Rating |
| AllMusic | 3.5/5 stars |
| The A.V. Club | B |
| Blurt | 7/10 stars |
| Consequence of Sound | B |
| Paste | 7.7/10 |
| Pitchfork | 4.6/10 |
| PopMatters | 7/10 stars |
| Spectrum Culture | 3.5/5 stars |

Safe Travels garnered positive reviews from music critics. At Metacritic, which assigns a normalized rating out of 100 to reviews from mainstream critics, the album received an average score of 70, based on 8 reviews.

Blurt writer Tim Hinely gave note of the album being a culmination of their overall sound from their first two records, calling it "just as whimsical and good-timey" as both of them. He also pointed out that they take influence from Billy Joel, Talking Heads and Ben Folds throughout the track listing, concluding that "Jukebox the Ghost proudly wear its pop influences on their sleeves and quite frankly don't care whether you like those influences or not." AllMusic's James Christopher Monger called it "an expertly crafted collection of radio-ready, melodious indie pop" that is "steadier and decidedly more confident" than Everything Under the Sun, but still retains its pedigree of "balancing big hooks with progressive rock structuring, and engaging melodies with clever lyrics." The A.V. Club's Noel Murray wrote, "While Safe Travels still gets overly busy and bombastic at times, and while Thornewill's and Siegel's songwriting can still come across as overbearing, the potential is always there: Not just for another unbeatable winner like "Somebody," but for little beams of light to come breaking through the clouds, illuminating the clutter."

Billy Hepfinger of PopMatters felt the record had a more "pristine and lush" production and more sophisticated "melodies and song structures" throughout the track listing, but was filtered through a "soggy early '00s indie sound" that comes across "a little too generic, or a little too uninspired", concluding that "Safe Travels is the sound of Jukebox the Ghost gearing up for the next phase of their career, the one where they swing for the fences. It's natural they'd experience some growing pains along the way." Michael Edwards of Exclaim! praised the album for its Ben Folds-inspired tracks ("At Last", "Don't Let Me Fall Behind"), but criticized the second half for trying to be more earnest, concluding that "Jukebox The Ghost need to focus on their strengths rather than their attempts to be taken seriously." Lindsay Zoladz of Pitchfork criticized the band's "excessive earnestness" in their musicianship and the album's overall sound being "paralyzingly afraid to offend", concluding that "there will be an audience for bands like Jukebox the Ghost, who at least do this unoffensive brand of power-pap serviceably. But if you're too much of a realist to believe in trick lighting, happy endings or choreographed emotion, Safe Travels will probably leave you wishing for riskier terrain."

== Track listing ==
| No. | Title | Vocalist | Length |
|---|---|---|---|
| 1. | "Somebody" | Thornewill | 4:06 |
| 2. | "Oh, Emily" | Siegel | 4:04 |
| 3. | "At Last" | Thornewill | 3:36 |
| 4. | "Say When" | Siegel | 4:06 |
| 5. | "Don't Let Me Fall Behind" | Thornewill | 3:50 |
| 6. | "Dead" | Siegel | 4:16 |
| 7. | "Adulthood" | Thornewill | 3:31 |
| 8. | "Ghosts In Empty Houses" | Siegel | 3:58 |
| 9. | "Devils On Our Side" | Thornewill | 2:27 |
| 10. | "All For Love" | Thornewill | 3:33 |
| 11. | "Man In The Moon" | Siegel | 1:58 |
| 12. | "Everybody Knows" | Thornewill | 3:54 |
| 13. | "The Spiritual" | Thornewill | 3:49 |
| 14. | "A La La [Bonus Track]" | Thornewill | 3:18 |
| Total length: | | | 47:02 |

== Personnel ==
Jukebox the Ghost

- Jesse Kristin – drums, percussion
- Tommy Siegel – bass, composer, guitar, vocals
- Ben Thornewill – accordion, composer, keyboards, piano, vocals

Additional musicians

- Jonathan Dinklage – viola, violin
- Dave Eggar – cello
- Seth Faulk – congas
- Meredith McCandless – drum engineering, piano engineer

Production and recording

- Elliot Jacobson – production assistant
- Jukebox the Ghost – primary artist, producer
- Devin Kerr – mastering, mixing
- Dan Romer – engineer, mixing, producer
- Mike Tuccillo – vocal engineer

Imagery

- Christopher Ferrino – artwork, cover painting
- Michael Triplett – design
- Christine Valentim – photography

== Charts ==
| Chart (2012) | Peak position |
|---|---|
| US Heatseekers Albums (Billboard) | 12 |
| US Independent Albums (Billboard) | 13 |
