= Lips Like Morphine =

EP by Kill Hannah
- Released: May 16, 2006
- Recorded: 2005–2006
- Genre: Alternative rock
- Length: 17:26
- Label: Atlantic
- Producer: Johnny K Matt Hyde; Sean Beavan; Tommie Sunshine

Kill Hannah chronology
Kill Hannah (2002)	Lips Like Morphine (2006)

Lips Like Morphine was first released on May 16, 2006, by the Chicago-based band Kill Hannah and was later included in August on the band's album Until There's Nothing Left of Us. Ahead of the album release, the original EP and main single were released on social platform Myspace. The first release included demo versions of "Rebel Yell". On June 13, 2006, the correct version of "Rebel Yell" was put up. It was thought at first that the wrong version of "Goodnight, Goodbye" was released on this EP. This was due to its appearance on a rare promo called 1993–1999 which had an early mix on it. The version on this EP is the correct and final version.

== Track listing ==
Original release (May 16, 2006)

1. "Lips Like Morphine" – 3:44
2. "Rebel Yell" – 4:41 (Billy Idol cover)
3. "Goodnight, Goodbye" – 3:40
4. "Kennedy (Hilton Is the New Kennedy Redo)" – 5:21

Corrected release (June 13, 2006)

1. "Lips Like Morphine" – 3:44
2. "Rebel Yell" – 4:48
3. "Goodnight, Goodbye" – 3:40
4. "Kennedy (Hilton Is the New Kennedy Redo)" – 5:21
