= Everything Under the Sun (Jukebox the Ghost album) =

Studio album by Jukebox the Ghost
- Released: September 7, 2010
- Studio: Tarquin Studios; Bridgeport, Connecticut
- Genre: Power pop; indie pop; pop rock
- Length: 41:35
- Label: Yep Roc
- Producer: Peter Katis

Jukebox the Ghost chronology
Let Live & Let Ghosts (2008)	Everything Under the Sun (2010)	Safe Travels (2012)

Singles from Everything Under the Sun
- 1. "Empire" Released: June 1, 2010; 2. "Schizophrenia" Released: 2010; 3. "Half Crazy" Released: 2010; 4. "Summer Sun" Released: 2010

Professional ratings
Aggregate scores
Source	Rating
Metacritic	76/100
Review scores
Source	Rating
AllMusic	3.5/5 stars
The A.V. Club	(A−)
Consequence of Sound	A−
PopMatters	9/10 stars
SPIN	6/10 stars
The Washington Post	(mixed)

Everything Under the Sun is the second studio album by American power pop band, Jukebox the Ghost. The album was released on September 7, 2010 through Yep Roc Records.

== Track listing ==
No.	Title	Vocalist	Length
1.	"Schizophrenia"	Thornewill	3:44
2.	"Half Crazy"	Siegel	3:03
3.	"Empire"	Thornewill	3:38
4.	"Summer Sun"	Thornewill	2:15
5.	"Mistletoe"	Thornewill	3:44
6.	"The Sun"	Siegel	3:06
7.	"So Let Us Create"	Thornewill	3:50
8.	"Carrying"	Thornewill/Siegel	4:16
9.	"The Sun (Interlude)"	N/A	1:02
10.	"The Stars"	Siegel	4:53
11.	"The Popular Thing"	Thornewill	3:43
12.	"Nobody"	Thornewill	4:23
Total length:			41:35

Bonus Version
No.	Title	Length
13.	"Empire (Freelance Whales Remix)"	3:54

== Rock Band Network singles ==
Alongside the other singles released from the album, 5 singles were released as downloadable content for Rock Band 3 via the Rock Band Network service. All songs that were released for the RBN are no longer available for purchase, though Half Crazy was later released as downloadable content for Rock Band 4.

Song name	Date Released (Xbox 360)	Date Released (Playstation 3)
Half Crazy	Apr 18, 2011	Jun 21, 2011
Schizophrenia	May 12, 2011	Jul 26, 2011
Empire	Jun 2, 2011	Sep 13, 2011
The Stars	Jul 14, 2011	Sep 13, 2011
So Let Us Create	Sep 1, 2011	Feb 14, 2012

== Personnel ==
Jukebox the Ghost

- Jesse Kristin – drums, percussion
- Tommy Siegel – guitar, vocals
- Ben Thornewill – keyboard, piano, vocals

Production and recording

- Greg Calbi – mastering
- Christopher Ferrino – photography
- Greg Giorgio – engineer
- Peter Katis – engineer, mixing, producer
- Cindi Peters – production coordination
- Carolyn Wachnicki – artwork

== Charts ==
Chart (2010)	Peak position
US Independent Albums (Billboard)	38
