= American Jet Set =

Studio album by Kill Hannah
- Released: 1999
- Genre: Alternative rock, electronica, shoegaze
- Length: 43:56
- Label: Baby Doll, Arcadeltic
- Producer: H. Beno

Kill Hannah chronology
Here Are the Young Moderns (1998)	American Jet Set (1999)	For Never & Ever (2003)

American Jet Set (1999) is an album by Kill Hannah. It was produced and co-written by Howie Beno.

The song "All That He Wants (American Jet Set)" was featured in the 2000 film Track Down.

== Track listing ==
All songs written by Mat Devine, except where noted.

1. "Future # 1" – 3:38
2. "All That He Wants (American Jet Set)" (Devine, Howie Beno) – 4:23
3. "Nerve Gas" – 3:47
4. "Don't Die Wondering" (Devine, Howie Beno) – 3:39
5. "Sick Boy" – 3:53
6. "Hyperactive" – 4:45
7. "Get Famous" – 5:22
8. "Los Angeles" (Devine, Finerty) – 4:55
9. "A New Medicine" (Finerty, Howie Beno) – 3:05
10. "He Believes in Time Machines" – 6:33

== Album credits ==
H. Beno (Keyboards), H. Beno (Programming), H. Beno (Producer), H. Beno (Engineer), H. Beno (Drum Programming), H. Beno (Mixing), Kerry Finerty (Guitar), Kerry Finerty (Vocals (Background)), Kerry Finerty (Actor), Jason Rau (Mastering), Dan Stout (Mastering), Chad Adams (Engineer), Mark Smalling (Photography), Chad Steinhardt (Engineer), Garret Hammond (Drums), Greg Corner (Bass), Greg Corner (Sound Effects), Greg Corner (Vocals), Greg Corner (Video), Greg Corner (Transportation), John Autry (Assistant), Matt Skaggs (Loops)
