= The White Tie Affair =

US musical group

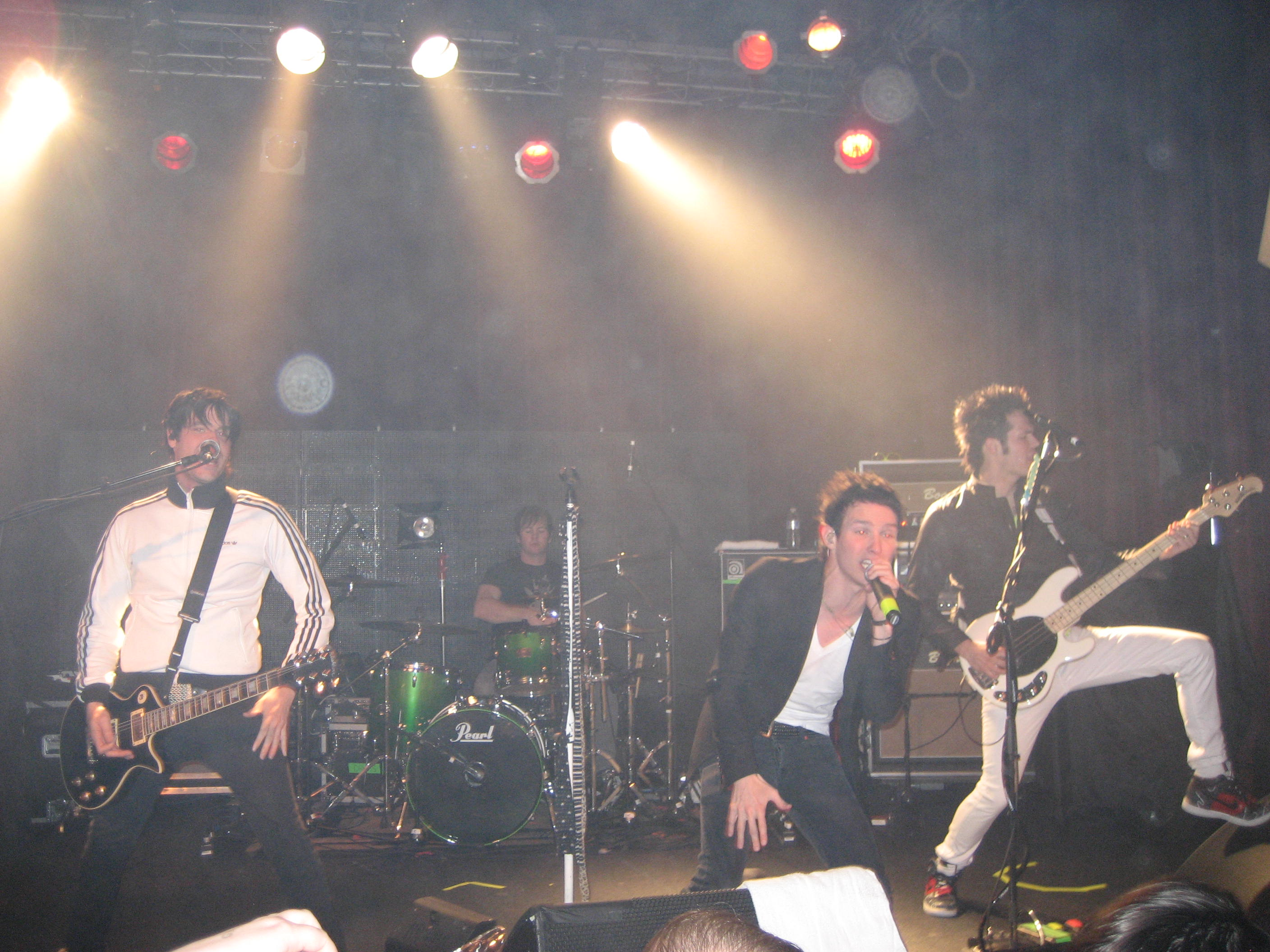
- The White Tie Affair performing at Fine Line Music Cafe during the Fame Ball Tour in downtown Minneapolis, Minnesota, March 2009

Background information
- Origin: Chicago, Illinois, U.S.
- Genres: Pop rock; neon pop; dance-rock; electronic
- Years active: 2006–2012; 2020
- Labels: Epic Records; Sony BMG; Slightly Dangerous
- Past members: Chris Wallace; Sean Patwell; Tim McLaughlin; Ryan McLain; Ryan Cook; Jeremy Johnson
- Website: facebook.com/thewhitetieaffair

The White Tie Affair (also known as TWTA) was an American pop rock band from Chicago. The group consisted of vocalist Chris Wallace, guitarist Sean Patwell, drummer Tim McLaughlin, and keyboardist Ryan McLain. In early 2007, the band signed with Epic Records/Slightly Dangerous and released their debut studio album, Walk This Way, in April 2008. The album contains three singles, "Allow Me to Introduce Myself... Mr. Right", "Candle (Sick and Tired)" and "The Letdown", which the first two have been featured on MTV's TRL and The Hills. "Candle (Sick and Tired)" became the group's biggest hit to date, reaching number 57 on the Billboard Hot 100. The group toured with Lady Gaga, Metro Station and Secondhand Serenade, among many more, in support of the album.

The group planned on releasing their second album in the fall of 2010, with "You Look Better When I'm Drunk" being released as the lead single in April 2010. However, after they were dropped by their label, the album was scrapped and the group officially broke up in June 2012. Singer Chris Wallace embarked on a solo career shortly after, before the band briefly reunited in 2020, to release a previously unreleased song titled, "Seasons".

== History ==
=== 2006–2009: Early years and Walk This Way ===
The White Tie Affair formed in Chicago, Illinois, in the summer of 2006, when singer Chris Wallace and guitarist Sean Patwell wrote their first song titled "Mr. Right." The two were in another band called A Perfect Gentleman, when they decided to write "a different kind of song." According to Wallace, the two wanted to do something more "pop-based" with influences from Prince and Michael Jackson. They posted the track on their MySpace page on October 31, 2006, which soon garnered "a flurry of hits." Keyboardist Ryan McLain and drummer Tim McLaughlin, both in the band called Made In Hollywood, joined The White Tie Affair to complete the band's line-up. The group also added Jeremy Johnson on bass guitar.

After releasing "Mr. Right", the band signed with Epic Records/Slightly Dangerous in 2007. Soon after, the song was released as the band's debut single, under its full name, "Allow Me to Introduce Myself... Mr. Right." In June and July 2007, the band went on a cross-country U.S. tour alongside Fireworks. In the fall of 2007, the band recorded their debut studio album, Walk This Way, at Annetenna Studios in Burbank, California. In January 2008, Jeremy Johnson left the band and was replaced by Ryan Cook, Wallace's high school friend.

In March 2008, the band was invited to perform at the annual "Pajama Party" at the Playboy Mansion. The band later embarked on the Playboy's College Tour. That same month, the band supported Secondhand Serenade on the Breaking the Silence Tour, with Automatic Loveletter and Making April. On April 22, 2008, Walk This Way, the band's debut, was officially released, via Epic Records. It was produced by Matt Mahaffey and Jeff Turzo of Wired All Wrong. The album peaked at number 168 on the Billboard 200. The music video for "Allow Me to Introduce Myself... Mr. Right" premiered a few days prior to the album release, on April 14, on No Good TV. The music video for "Candle (Sick and Tired)" premiered on MTV's Total Request Live on May 22, 2008, and "Allow Me to Introduce Myself... Mr. Right" premiered via MTV on June 5. In the summer of 2008, the group joined the 2nd Annual True Colors Tour for the show's Midwestern leg, sharing the stage with Cyndi Lauper, The B-52's and Rosie O'Donnell. They headlined several dates of Kill Hannah's Hope for the Hopeless tour during that time, along with The Medic Droid and Innerpartysystem. That fall, the band was part of Playboy's Girls of the Big 10 Tour and was featured in a fashion article in the magazine's November issue. From October to November 2008, the group supported Metro Station on their headlining tour, Disco Balls & Blow Up Dolls tour, joining Cash Cash and Tyga. The band appeared on The Hills on MTV, making a live performance on the show and filmed a music video. On November 18, "Candle (Sick and Tired)" was released for radio airplay as the album's second single. The song peaked at number 57 on the Billboard Hot 100. It also reached number three on the US Dance Club Songs chart. In December 2008, the band's remix of "All Black" was included in Good Charlotte's Greatest Remixes release. In late December, the band was involved in a van accident following a show in Metamora, Illinois. According to Wallace, the accident happened after they dropped off a few members, with him, bassist Ryan Cook and their tour manager being the only ones left in the van. None of them were seriously injured.

In March 2009, the White Tie Affair toured with Secondhand Serenade again in North America. They were also the opening act for Lady Gaga on her first solo North American tour, the Fame Ball Tour. After the Fame Ball tour, the band appeared at The Bamboozle and went on the 2009 Vans Warped Tour. In April 2009, the band appeared in Soundcheck Riders. On May 2, 2009, a new version of "Candle (Sick and Tired) premiered on MTV. Directed by Jon Watts, the video features a cameo appearance by Benji and Joel Madden of Good Charlotte and the female lead is played by Jessica Lee Rose. On July 29, the music video for "Take It Home" premiered on Fuse.tv. The band performed at various Six Flags locations as part of the mtvU VMA Tour in August.

=== 2010–2012, 2020: Cancelled second album, break-up and reunion ===
In October 2009, The White Tie Affair began their headlining tour, The Traveling Talent Show, along with Every Avenue, Stereo Skyline, and Runner Runner. Around this time, the band started recording material for their second album. Recorded in Los Angeles, they worked with producer Dr. Luke. According to Wallace, the band recorded a song called "Ice Cold" and was expected to be released to radio later that year. While on tour, the band performed a new song titled "She Knows", which was expected to be on the album.

In 2010, shortly after their headlining tour, drummer Tim McLaughlin left the band. He was never permanently replaced. On April 13, 2010, "You Look Better When I'm Drunk" was released as the lead single from their upcoming second album. The song peaked at number 35 on the US Mainstream Top 40 chart. In May, it was announced that the second album was scheduled for release in the fall of 2010, and a new track titled "Seasons" was made available for preview. The band supported Secondhand Serenade on an American tour in the summer, along with Runner Runner. During this tour, the band played new songs, "Tie Me Up, Don't Tie Me Down" and "Seasons". Though the album was planned for release in the fall, the group was dropped by their label and the release was ultimately cancelled.

In an online interview on June 8, 2012, Wallace revealed that the White Tie Affair had broken up. Reflecting on his time with the band and their split, Wallace said, "While I was finally getting the recognition I always dreamed of, for doing what I always wanted to do, the record company stepped in. They wanted us to write and record with who they thought were the 'best' producers and writers in the business instead of letting us make our own music. Right then, I realized that I didn't want to be part of a big machine." In August 2012, he announced he would release his debut solo album, Push Rewind, in September 2012.

In October 2020, Wallace and Patwell reunited the band to release a finished version of the previously unreleased demo, "Seasons", which the band had performed on tour, ten years prior.

== Musical styles and influences ==
The band's music is described as pop rock, neon pop, dance-rock and electronic. They have cited influences from Stevie Wonder, AFI and The Police. Speaking about their sound, Wallace stated, "Hellogoodbye was kind of one of those bands that in a sense told us it was OK to do what we were about to do with this band, because they're real poppy [...] I can honestly say that bands like that kind of persuaded us to say OK, we can do this." He also said the songs from their debut album Walk This Way, was written about situations in his life and "fantasies" about how life could be.

AllMusic writer, Matt Collar, described their sound as "'80s-influenced pop/rock that also features a heavy dance-oriented sound informed as much by contemporary artists like Fall Out Boy and Justin Timberlake as the iconic Duran Duran and Loverboy. Alex Young of Consequence.net referred to their music as "a mixture of Cobra Starship with a little bit of Fall Out Boy, some old school R&B and boy band inspired harmonies." In an October 31, 2008, review in The New York Times, music critic Jon Pareles wrote that The White Tie Affair's style was "leaning toward new-wave guitar and mixing apologies with come-ons." Michael Roberts of Westword was critical of the band's music, feeling that "there's such a glut of groups making the same kind of slick modern rock that the quota's currently full."

== Members ==
=== Former ===
- Chris Wallace – lead vocals (2006–2012, 2020)
- Sean Patwell – guitar (2006–2012, 2020), bass (2009), keyboards (2010)
- Ryan McLain – keyboards (2007–2012), guitar (2009–2012)
- Tim McLaughlin – drums (2007–2010)
- Ryan Cook – bass (2008–2009)
- Jeremy Johnson – bass (2007–2008)

== Discography ==
=== Studio albums ===
List of albums, with selected chart positions
Title	Album details	Peak chart positions	
Title	Album details	US	US Heat.
Walk This Way	Released: April 22, 2008; Label: Sony; Format: CD, digital download	168	4

=== Extended plays ===
List of extended plays with selected details
Title	EP details
The White Tie Affair	Released: 2008; Label: Epic; Format: CD
Get In Where You Fit In	Released: March 4, 2008; Label: Sony; Format: Digital download
Candle (Sick and Tired) [Remixes EP]	Released: March 12, 2009; Label: Sony; Format: Digital download

=== Singles ===
List of singles, with selected chart positions and certifications, showing year released and album name
Title	Year	Peak chart positions			Album
Title	Year	US	US Dance	US Pop	Album
"Allow Me to Introduce Myself... Mr. Right"	2007	—	—	—	Walk This Way
"Candle (Sick and Tired)"	2008	57	3	— (Note: "Candle (Sick and Tired)" did not enter the US Mainstream Top 40, but peaked at number 33 on the US Pop 100 chart.)	Walk This Way
"The Letdown"	2009	—	—	—	Walk This Way
"You Look Better When I'm Drunk"	2010	—	27	35	Non-album singles
"Seasons"	2020	—	—	—	Non-album singles
"—" denotes releases that did not chart.

=== Music videos ===
List of music videos, showing year released and director
Title	Year	Director	Ref.
"Candle (Sick And Tired)"	2008	Spencer Nicholson	
"Allow Me To Introduce Myself...Mr. Right"	2008	Spencer Nicholson	
"Candle (Sick And Tired) (2009 Version)"	2009	Jon Watts	
"Take It Home"	2009	Adam Neustadter	
