= Making April =

American alternative rock band

- Origin: Verplanck, New York, US
- Genres: Alternative rock Piano Rock; Acoustic
- Years active: 2005-2010
- Labels: Unsigned (Current); Universal Republic (2008); Fabtone Records (Current (JPN)); Radtone Music (2006 (JPN))
- Members: Sean Scanlon; Steven McCaffrey; Greg Federspiel
- Past members: Thomas Robertine

Making April was an American piano-based alternative rock band formed in Verplanck, New York, in 2005. The band consisted of vocalist and pianist Sean Scanlon, bassist Gregory Federspiel and guitarist and backing vocalist Steven McCaffrey.

Making April's first songs were released on a demo titled My First Demo!, in 2005. The band self-released their first EP in 2006, an eight track recording named Runaway World. The EP was released later in 2006 as a full album in Japan, through Radtone Music. In 2008, they signed to Universal Republic in the USA. The label released a re-recorded version of "These Are the Nights". Making April has previously featured as the #1 Top Unsigned Artist on Myspace. They have sold over 100,000 tracks on iTunes worldwide.

In September 2009, Scanlon, the lead vocalist, announced that the band would be going on hiatus.

In June 2010 Making April released Lost Sessions, a collection of unreleased material from their album The Egg Hunt.

The band broke up in 2010, with the band members seeking out new opportunities. They played their last show together in August 2010 in Salt Lake City.

Sean Scanlon now is the lead vocalist of Smallpools.

Greg Federspiel is now A&R at Warner Bros. Records and manager of the band The Downtown Fiction.

== History ==
=== Formation and early demos ===
Making April was formed in the dorm room of Sean Scanlon and Steven McCaffrey at University at Albany, State University of New York, when they began writing together in early 2005. They were joined by friend Greg Federspiel and recorded five demo songs, that would later become the basis of their eight track debut EP Runaway World. The demos were recorded at Leopard Recording Studio, and self-released under the title My First Demo! in March 2005.

Federspiel has said that the name of the band came from the members literally trying to 'make April'. "It was March 2005. After recording our first demos in the studio, we were anxious to put them on Pure Volume and MySpace, yet we didn’t have a name. So we sat there thinking that, ‘we need to have a name by April.’ And so that became the theme of things. Once April 1st came, we still didn’t have anything, and it just hit us. We were trying to ‘make April.’"

=== First EP and record deal ===
Making April went into record their debut EP in New Windsor, New York in January 2006 at Nada Recording Studios. The band partially self-produced the record, alongside producer John Naclerio. The debut EP was titled Runaway World, in reference to the band's song "Runaway World". The original release contained eight tracks and was released on April 11, 2006. The EP was released in Japan through Radtone Music on November 8, 2006. The Japanese version was noted as a full album, as it contained three additional tracks, "Hurry Up and Wait", "Don't Look Back" (previously from My First Demo! in 2005) and an acoustic version of "Roses and Butterflies". It was later re-issued in the USA on May 30, 2007, containing only two extra tracks "Hurry Up and Wait" and an acoustic version of title track "Runaway World".

On July 28, 2007, Making April played a showcasing show for labels Universal Records, Atlantic Records, Virgin Records, MySpace Records and Capitol Records, before eventually signing a contract with Universal. Making April released a new song on their Myspace soon after the signing of their "singles deal", a demo titled "Wide Awake".

The signing with Universal Republic enabled the band to produce one single. A re-recorded version of "These Are the Nights", which had previously been selected for usage on MTV's Laguna Beach, was released to radio in early 2008. The single was recorded by producer David Bendeth, who has previously worked with Paramore, Red Jumpsuit Apparatus and Vertical Horizon. It was posted on Myspace in conjunction with the radio release.

=== Debut album ===
Making April recorded their debut full-length album with producer Adam Richman, at the end of summer 2008. Throughout the entire month of June 2008, to "celebrate writing their debut album", the band gave away their debut EP for free through Myspace. They began recording in August, with the album originally due out "November, early December" of 2008. It was later announced and confirmed that the album would be released on March 3, 2009, and titled The Egg Hunt.

== Live ==
In early 2008, the band supported rock artist Secondhand Serenade with Rookie of the Year, Automatic Loveletter and White Tie Affair, on a two-month national tour of the United States. During live shows, the band has been known to use digital string tracks, with the Apple computer program GarageBand, to create a closer sound to their recorded songs.

The band performed on the Howard Stern show during a segment called "cockyoke".

== Members ==
=== Current ===
- Sean Scanlon: Lead vocalist, piano, guitar
- Gregory Federspiel: Bass guitar
- Steven McCaffrey: Lead guitar, backing vocals

=== Touring ===
- Bryan McGrath: Drums (2008)
- Adam Richman: Rhythm guitar, backing vocals (2008)
- Brendon Thomas: Rhythm guitar (2008)

=== Former ===
- Thomas Robertine: Drums (2005–2007)

== Discography ==
year	Album information	Sales
2006	Runaway World: First EP; Released: April 11, 2006; Re-released: May 30, 2007; Japan release: November 8, 2006 (Radtone Music)	10,000+ albums; 100,000+ singles
2009	The Egg Hunt: First studio album; Released: March 3, 2009	
