= Jukebox the Ghost =

American three-piece power pop band

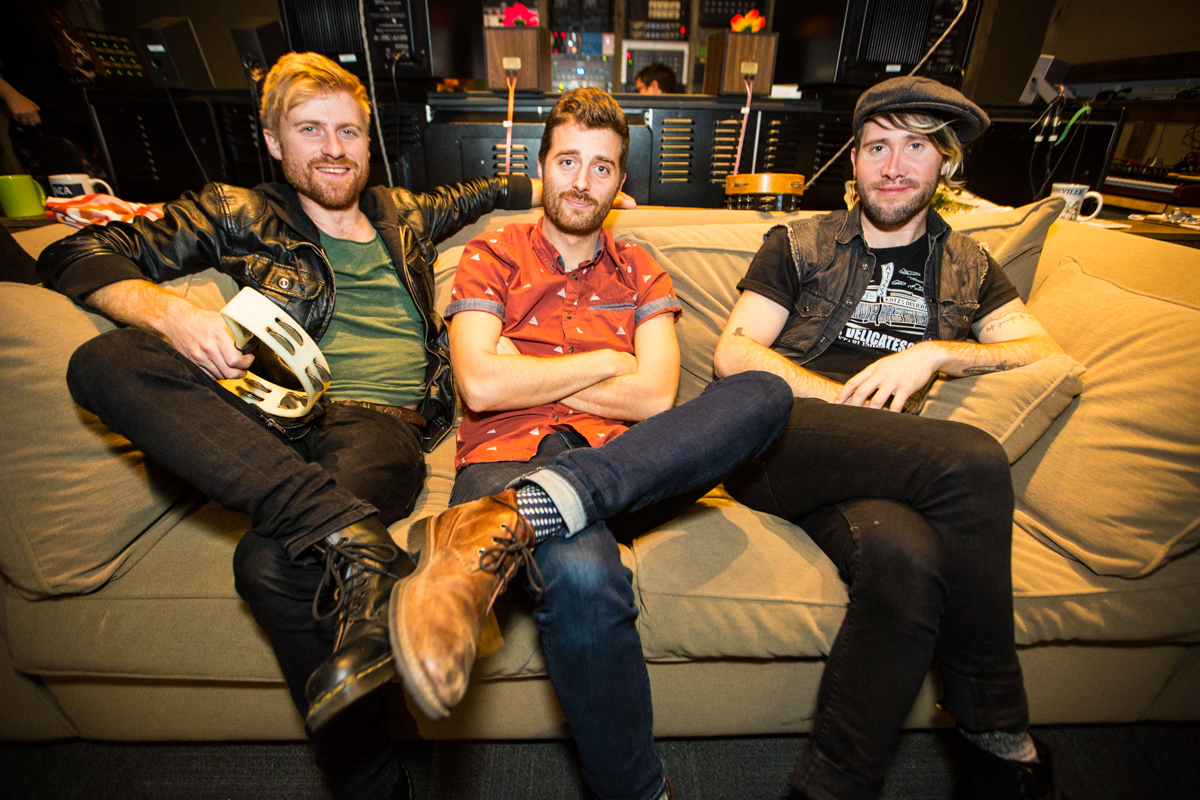
- (left to right) Tommy Siegel, Ben Thornewill, and Jesse Kristin of Jukebox The Ghost

Background information
- Also known as: The Sunday Mail (2003-2005)
- Origin: Washington DC metro-area
- Genres: Power pop, indie pop, pop rock, indie rock
- Years active: 2003–present
- Labels: Cherrytree Records, Yep Roc, Caroline Records
- Members: Ben Thornewill; Tommy Siegel; Jesse Kristin
- Website: jukeboxtheghost.com

Jukebox the Ghost is an American three-piece power pop band formed in the Washington, D.C. metro area. The band consists of Ben Thornewill (vocals & piano), Tommy Siegel (vocals & guitar) and Jesse Kristin (drums). The band has been active since 2003.

== History ==
In 2003, Thornewill, Siegel, and Kristin met while attending George Washington University, and formed a band called The Sunday Mail. After two years, they decided to change their name.

After they thought they had enough new material, they renamed themselves Jukebox the Ghost. The name was a combination of words chosen democratically, with "jukebox" originating from the lyrics of a Captain Beefheart song and "ghost" as a reference to a Nabokov novel. In a 2020 interview, Siegel said that the idea to add the word "ghost" to the band name occurred to Thornewill in particular, as "he really wanted something involving ghosts".

In 2008, they released their first album, Let Live & Let Ghosts which was recorded during winter break of their senior year of college.

Jukebox the Ghost recorded a cover of Ace of Base's "Beautiful Life" for Engine Room Recordings' compilation album Guilt by Association Vol. 2, which was released in November 2008.

After releasing their debut album, they toured with Say Hi and Nightmare of You, among others. In 2009 they toured with Ben Folds, followed shortly by a tour with Jenny Owen Youngs in the United States. The band began recording their sophomore album "Everything Under the Sun" on September 29, 2009, at Tarquin Studios in Bridgeport, Connecticut, an indie recording studio that specializes in analog recording.

In February 2010, Jukebox the Ghost toured Europe with Adam Green of The Moldy Peaches. This was followed by more touring in the United States with the bands Tally Hall and Skybox. They took another break and started playing live shows once again in late May 2010 with the band Free Energy, and once headlined as a minor band at Lollapalooza in Chicago.

September 1, 2010, marked a major milestone for the band, as they appeared on the Late Show with David Letterman. Jukebox the Ghost opened for Barenaked Ladies during the fall of 2010 from October through November, and were a featured band on the Barenaked Ladies-hosted Sixthman cruise, Ships & Dip 4, in February 2011. Jukebox The Ghost also was a featured band on another Sixthman Cruise, "Rombello", in September 2011, and toured with Guster soon after. The band opened for Jack's Mannequin and Motion City Soundtrack in 2012.

On June 12, 2012, Jukebox the Ghost released their third album, Safe Travels. The album marked a departure from their often fictional narratives in favor of more personal lyrics. In an interview with Jukebox the Ghost, Ben Thornewill stated that "this record has a lot of songs that are directly from our own life experience. Whether they are journalistically accurate or not, probably not, but they come from something in our lives, not something we're imagining."

On May 23, 2014, they released a new single, "The Great Unknown" from their self-titled fourth record, Jukebox the Ghost which was released on October 21, 2014.

On January 21, 2015, the band announced they had signed with preeminent pop alternative label Cherrytree Records. Cherrytree Records is a subsidiary of Interscope Records. Jukebox the Ghost re-released their self-titled album in February 2015, under their new label. This was quickly followed by the band's performance of "Postcard" on Conan on January 26. As of January 2016, they are no longer affiliated with Cherrytree Records.

In late March 2015, the group announced a national summer tour with Ingrid Michaelson. In early April they released the music video for "Postcard".

The band also wrote a song called "Black Hole" for The Mr. Peabody & Sherman Show. "Black Hole" was featured on an episode in 2015.

That year, the band began their annual "HalloQueen" shows, a series of performances around Halloween in which the band wears costumes inspired by and covers songs by Queen. What began as a pair of small shows in 2015 evolved to tours in 2018 and 2019.

On March 6, 2017, after nearly three years on tour leave from recording, the group released the single, "Stay the Night". The song was featured in the second season of Rob Schneider's Netflix series, Real Rob.

While performing in late 2017, the group announced that they had recently finished recording a new album and debuted a new song from that album, "Boring".

On January 19, 2018, the group announced the new single "Everybody's Lonely" along with a new album titled Off to the Races. The album was released on March 30, 2018. In addition, the group announced a national tour to support the album beginning in Spring 2018.

The single "Cheers" was released on September 8, 2021. On March 8, 2022, the band confirmed that their next album would be entitled Cheers after the lead single and released the album cover art. Cheers was released on May 27, 2022.

== Band members ==
- Ben Thornewill – vocals, keyboards
- Tommy Siegel – vocals, guitar, bass
- Jesse Kristin – drums, percussion, vocals (on albums Jukebox the Ghost and Cheers)

Additional musicians (only on Safe Travels)

- Jonathan Dinklage – violin
- Dave Eggar – cello
- Seth Faulk – conga
- Dan Romer – additional instruments

== Discography ==
- Let Live & Let Ghosts (2008)
- Everything Under the Sun (2010)
- Safe Travels (2012)
- Jukebox the Ghost (2014)
- Off to the Races (2018)
- Cheers (2022)
- Phantasmagorical Vol. 1 (2025)
