= Kill Hannah =

American rock band

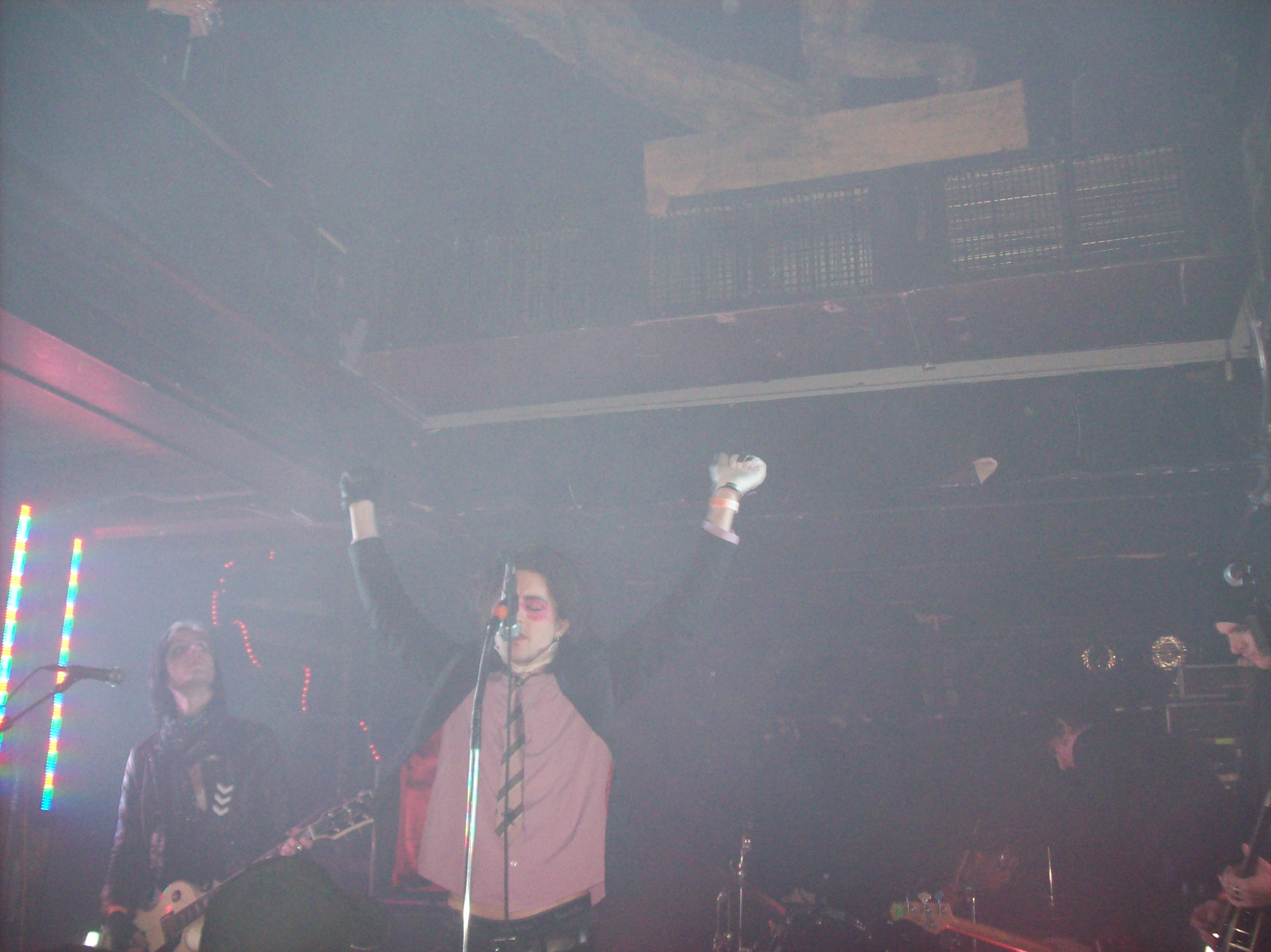
- Kill Hannah performing in 2008

Background information
- Origin: Chicago, Illinois, U.S.
- Genres: Alternative rock, post-punk revival
- Years active: 1993–2015
- Labels: Atlantic, Original Signal, Universal Motown, Roadrunner
- Spinoffs: Wrongchilde
- Past members: Mat Devine; Jonathan Radtke; Dan Wiese; Greg Corner; Elias Mallin; Garrett Hammond; Kerry Finerty; Daniel Wenberg; Michael Lee; Isaac Bender; James Connelly; Allen Morgenstern; Michael Maddox
- Website: killhannah.com

Kill Hannah was an American rock band formed in 1993 in Chicago, Illinois. The band released six studio albums, seven EPs, and two compilation albums as well as three DVDs.

== History ==
Kill Hannah was formed by singer-songwriter Mat Devine in 1993. The band is named after Devine's ex-girlfriend. At the time, Devine was singing and playing guitar in a band called In a Jar UK. After the fallout with Hannah, Devine printed up stickers to place on In a Jar UK 7" records bearing the name "Kill Hannah." All of Kill Hannah's studio albums, EPs, promos, and demos between 1996 and 2000 were funded by entertainment lawyer Jack Daulton.

Kill Hannah signed with Atlantic Records in late 2002, while being managed by Steve Hutton. Kill Hannah has since parted company with Hutton. The band recorded their Atlantic Records debut For Never & Ever in Los Angeles, California in the winter of 2003 with producer Sean Beavan and mixer Tim Palmer. The album was mostly re-recorded versions of back-catalog songs and numbers that had been performed live for about a year prior. The band shot video for the song "Unwanted," but did not release it until 2006, when they released it as an Internet-only clip. The band released their second album, Until There's Nothing Left of Us, with Atlantic Records, on August 1, 2006. They signed with Roadrunner Records outside of the US and released Until There's Nothing Left of Us for the UK on March 24. Kill Hannah's Atlantic albums have sold over 100,000 copies.

Through much of 2003 to 2007, Kill Hannah performed with Chevelle, HIM, Papa Roach, Thousand Foot Krutch, AFI, Dashboard Confessional, Neverending White Lights, and The Sounds, while also opening for bands such as Jane's Addiction, Everclear, Eve 6, Mindless Self Indulgence, Thirty Seconds to Mars, and The All-American Rejects.

The single "Kennedy" received some attention. It was performed on Last Call with Carson Daly and featured on television shows such as Jack & Bobby, One Tree Hill, and North Shore.

After finishing the US leg of the Hope for the Hopeless tour with InnerPartySystem, The White Tie Affair, and The Medic Droid, the European leg was interrupted when on October 21, 2008, Kill Hannah's tour bus caught fire while driving through Switzerland. Almost all of their personal belongings were burnt so badly that they were no longer usable, including clothing, laptops, passports and all of the gifts from fans they had acquired during the tour. Although no one was hurt, their schedules for Paris and Belgium had to be canceled whilst they waited for a replacement bus from Manchester, England. The tour then resumed in Stoke, England on October 24.

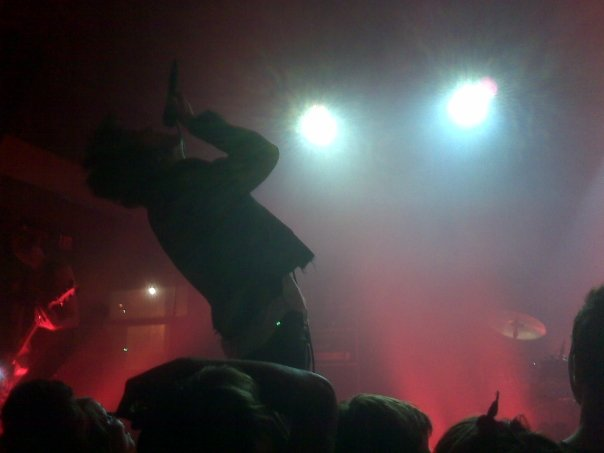
Mat Devine at Crofoot in Pontiac, Michigan on August 19, 2008.

In an interview with Kerrang! magazine in 2008, vocalist Mat Devine stated that the band will begin preparation for the next studio album after the Hope for the Hopeless tour has ended. However, he stated that this album will be "heavier" and "more aggressive" than the last albums. Commenting on the album he said: "I'm not saying this will be the next Necrophagist or Burzum but its going to be a lot more aggressive and heavier than the others. But I am confident fans will enjoy it as we are 200% prepared so we know what to include and not to include. We've always intended to make a heavy album and this is our time."

Guitarist Jonathan Radtke did not join the band on the Europe leg of their fall 2008 Hope for the Hopeless tour. Tom Schleiter, the guitarist from Powerspace, joined them in his place. Radtke returned to play the band's yearly "New Heart for Xmas" show in Chicago (during which the band premiered two new songs: "Snowblinded" and "Radio", but bassist Greg Corner later confirmed in a radio interview with Chicago's Q101 that Radtke had in fact left the band to pursue other projects and had not been present in recording their new album. Posts on Radtke's Twitter account refer to his new side project, Polar Moon.

Due to a change in record labels, Kill Hannah canceled their Spring 2009 United Kingdom tour. The new record deal has the band under a deadline to put out their newest album, Wake Up the Sleepers, by the end of summer 2009; thus forcing the band to stay in the United States to record. The remainder of their fall US tour dates also had to be cancelled after their van and equipment were stolen in Philadelphia in November 2009.

In August 2009, guitarist Michael Maddox joined the band and has since participated in several shows and tours.

In June 2010, Kill Hannah announced they would be touring with Smashing Pumpkins on a "special U.S. run of intimate venues" during the summer of 2010.

On October 3, 2010, Kill Hannah announced that their annual "New Heart for Xmas" concert in Chicago would be postponed until further notice due to Mat Devine's involvement in a Broadway musical and other member scheduling conflicts.

On October 11, 2011, Kill Hannah announced that New Heart For Xmas 8 would be at The Bottom Lounge in Chicago, with opening acts Awaken the Empire, and Comasoft. The band also announced that they would be playing an intimate "Storytellers" show at JBTV studios.

Mat Devine has stated that the band is planning on recording an album for a 2012 release. A couple of new songs have been played at concerts of 2013, but none have had an official release and there are only recordings of them from concerts.

On August 6, 2015, it was announced via the band's Facebook page that after 20 years the band will be performing their last show where it all began at The Metro in Chicago, IL on December 19, 2015, for New Heart For Christmas X.

== Members ==
=== Final Lineup ===
- Mat Devine – lead vocals
- Dan Wiese – rhythm guitar, backing vocals
- Greg Corner – bass
- Elias Mallin – drums
- Jonathan Radtke – lead guitar, backing vocals

=== Former ===
- Garrett Hammond – drums
- James Connelly – drums
- Allen Morgenstern – bass
- Daniel Wenberg – drums
- Michael Lee – drums
- Isaac Bender – guitar, keyboards
- Kerry Finerty – lead guitar, backing vocals
- Michael Maddox – lead guitar (live only)
- Mikey Way – bass (live only)

== Discography ==
=== Studio albums ===
Year	Title	Record label
1996	The Beauty in Sinking Ships	Self-released
1998	Here Are the Young Moderns	Self-released
1999	American Jet Set	Baby Doll Records (CD), Arcadeltic Records (iTunes)
2003	For Never & Ever	Atlantic Records
2006	Until There's Nothing Left of Us	Atlantic Records
2008	Hope for the Hopeless	Self-released
2009	Wake Up the Sleepers	Original Signal Recordings/Universal Motown Records

=== EPs ===
Year	Title	Record label
1996	Hummingbirds the Size of Bullets	Self-released
1996	Sleeping Like Electric Eels	Self-released
1997	Stunt Pilots	Self-released
2001	Unreleased Cuts 2000/2001	Self-released
2002	Kill Hannah Tour EP	Self-released
2006	Lips Like Morphine EP	Atlantic Records

=== Compilations ===
2004	The Curse of Kill Hannah	Self-released

=== Promos ===
- Lovesick/Nerve Gas (cassette promo; 1997)
- "All That He Wants (American Jet Set)" (3-track single; 1999)
- "Welcome to Chicago, Motherfucker" (1-track single; 2000)
- Kill Hannah Sampler ("Kennedy"/"Big Shot" snippet; 2003)
- "Kennedy" (1-track single; 2003)
- 1993–1999 (5-track CD with four older songs plus "Goodnight, Goodbye"; 2003)
- "A New Heart for Christmas" (1-track single; 2003)
- "Lips Like Morphine" (1-track single; 2006)
- "Lips Like Morphine" Remixes (2006)
- "Crazy Angel" Remixes (2007)
- "Boys and Girls" (promo 3-track single; 2008)
- "New York City Speed" Remixes (iTunes maxi-single; June 2010)
- "Promise Me" (4-track single; February 7, 2011)

=== DVDs ===
- Welcome to Chicago (December 2005)
- New Heart for X-Mas 6 limited edition (December 2008)
- Seize the Days (December 2008)

=== Singles ===
Year	Song	US Hot 100	U.S. Modern Rock	Album
1998	"Nerve Gas"	-		Trendy Compilation
1999	"Hummingbirds the Size of Bullets"	-	-	Hummingbirds the Size of Bullets
2003	"Kennedy"	-	-	For Never & Ever
2006	"Lips Like Morphine"	-	35	Until There's Nothing Left of Us
2008	"Boys and Girls"	-	-	For Never & Ever
2009	"Strobe Lights"	-	-	Wake Up the Sleepers
2011	"Promise Me"	-	-	Wake Up the Sleepers
2011	"Why I Have My Grandma's Sad Eyes"	-	-	Wake Up the Sleepers
