= Mat Devine =

American singer-songwriter

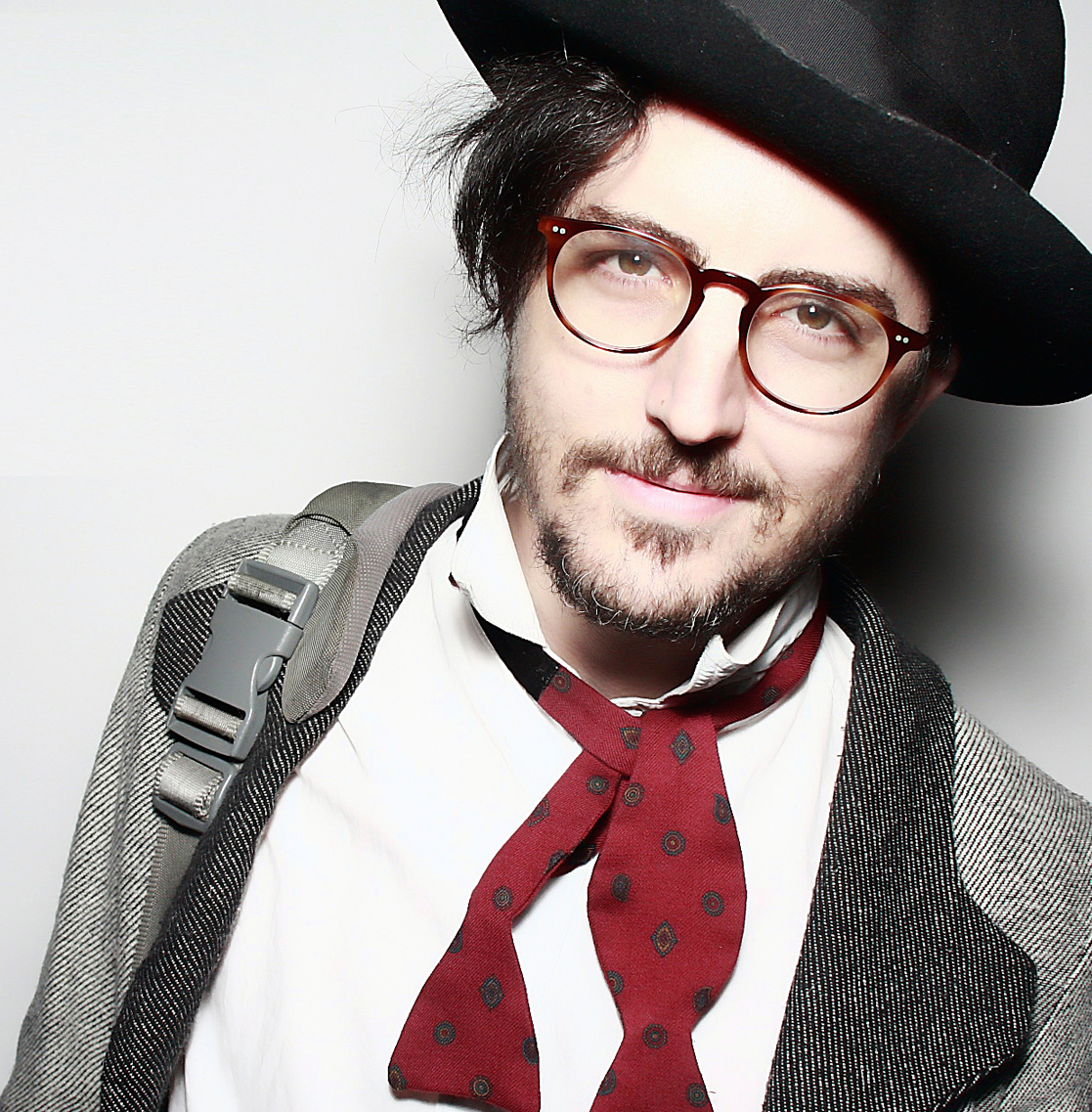
- Mat Devine in 2014

Background information
- Born: Matthew Devine; April 16, 1975 (age 51); Norwalk, Connecticut, United States
- Genres: Alternative rock
- Occupations: Musician, singer-songwriter
- Instruments: Vocals, guitar, keyboards, piano
- Years active: 1993–present
- Labels: Atlantic Records; Original Signal; Universal Motown; Roadrunner UK

Mat Devine (born Matthew Devine, April 16, 1975) is an American singer, songwriter and musician. He created and fronted the alternative rock band Kill Hannah. His debut solo album, Gold Blooded, was released in August 2014. He is currently the Head of Music Partnerships at Cameo.

== Personal life ==
Devine was born in Norwalk, Connecticut, United States. He spent his early years in Norwalk and nearby Westport, Connecticut. Eventually his family moved to West Nyack, New York, where he attended Clarkstown High School South. In his junior year, his family moved again to Lake Forest, Illinois, where he graduated from Lake Forest High School. He enrolled in Illinois State University as an English major, and after 2 years, he transferred to the School of the Art Institute of Chicago where he graduated with a BFA in Film.

He lived in Chicago until August 2010 when he moved to New York City. In 2013 he moved to Los Angeles. He has two sisters.

Devine's first studio experience was in the home of director John Hughes, where Hughes's son, John Hughes III, recorded four of Devine's songs. Hughes and Devine went on to record several songs together at Chicago Trax and Gravity Studios with engineer Critter.

== Career ==
=== Music ===
==== Kill Hannah ====
At 19 years old, while working on a project called in a Jar UK, in Normal, Illinois, Devine went through a break-up with a 17-year-old girl named Hannah. He then wrote the song "Kill Hannah", which would later inspire the name of his band.

The band, formed at the School of the Art Institute of Chicago, evolved over several years, self-releasing two LPs, four EPs, and earning a substantial local following- regularly selling out Chicago's legendary live venue The Metro- before signing with Atlantic Records in 2003.

For the next four years, the band toured across the US in support of two albums and singles, sharing the stage with bands like Thirty Seconds to Mars, HIM, AFI, Angels and Airwaves, Chevelle, The Used, Flyleaf, My Chemical Romance, Velvet Revolver, Alice in Chains, The Sounds, and Shiny Toy Guns. Their combined albums on Atlantic sold over 200,000 copies.

In 2007, the band signed to Roadrunner Records in the UK, which initiated several tours to UK, Europe and Scandinavia in support of the worldwide release of their album Until There's Nothing Left of Us.

In 2009, Kill Hannah signed with New York-based Original Signal Recordings / Universal Motown for the release of Wake Up the Sleepers. The album features guest vocals by Amanda Palmer, Chibi (The Birthday Massacre), Good Charlotte's Benji Madden, and the Chicago Children's Choir. In support of the album, the band toured separately with Papa Roach, JET, Morningwood, She Wants Revenge, Smashing Pumpkins, My Passion, and Lacuna Coil.

==== Setting Fires ====
In the summer of 2009, Devine collaborated with songwriter Alain Whyte, best known as the lead guitarist and principal songwriter for UK indie rock artist Morrissey. They called in musician Dean Butterworth of Good Charlotte to contribute drums and production team Davey Julson-Rieley as producer, and AFI and Green Day mixer Joe McGrath. EP1 was released for digital download on September 14, 2010, and the first single "The Search" was featured in the season premier of One Tree Hill.

=== Solo record ===
Mat announced in 2013 that he was recording a solo record. The album, Gold Blooded, will be released under the pseudonym Wrongchilde, and features collaborations with Gerard Way of My Chemical Romance, and Morgan Kibby and Sierra Kusterbeck of VersaEmerge.

=== Broadway ===
On August 16, 2010, Devine was officially announced as having accepting the principal role of teenage comic book addict Grim Hunter in the original cast of Spider-Man: Turn Off the Dark. He was asked to audition when a producer for the show saw a Kill Hannah CD on the desk of Devine's lawyer. The production is directed by Julie Taymor, based on the book that she co-wrote with Glen Berger. Music and lyrics are written by Bono and The Edge of U2.

Devine was quoted in Kerrang! Magazine as saying, "...the music is great and I can't begin to overstate how impressive the set is. It's epic and revolutionary!" Devine has signed on for a minimum one year commitment.

When the show went on hiatus to input revisions, Devine was retired as the "Geek Chorus" was cut.

=== The Raccoon Society, Thought Catalog, and Book ===
In 2004, Devine was commissioned by Fuse TV to write periodic blog entries for their website. Devine used the blog to relate personal stories, experiences of the band on tour, and to dialogue with fans in Q&A entries. His friend/guest bloggers have included: Mikey Way (My Chemical Romance), Bam Margera, Benji Madden (Good Charlotte), Tomo (Thirty Seconds to Mars), Jeremy Dawson (Shiny Toy Guns), We the Kings, Amanda Palmer, The Maine, and William Beckett (The Academy Is...). The blog has since left Fuse TV, and is now a website and forum called The Raccoon Society, where users are encouraged to post questions and support each other. Mat also responds to posts and has pages on the site dedicated to various resources available around the world for those in need. There is also an official Raccoon Society Twitter feed.

With his departure from Fuse TV, Devine has become a regular contributor of opinion/editorial pieces for Thought Catalog, developing a following due to his distinct and unique style and subject matter.

In December 2013, Devine released his first book, Weird War One: The Antihero's Guide to Surviving Everyday Life, with the help of Thought Catalog. The book is based on questions left by users on The Raccoon Society, and the responses that Devine wrote to them.

=== Online presence and social media ===
Devine posts on Tumblr under the Wrongchilde moniker, uses Instagram, and also has a verified Twitter account. He also has a Facebook fan page.

=== Cameo ===
As of 2018, Devine is currently the Head of Music Partnerships at Cameo
