= Freestyle (Filipino band) =

Filipino pop and R&B band

- Origin: Davao City, Davao del Sur, Philippines
- Genres: Pop, R&B, soul
- Years active: 1996–present
- Labels: Viva Records, independent, Press Pause Media Productions, Inc. (present)
- Members: Top Suzara; IJ Garcia; Ian Tan; Bouy Manalo; Gibson Viduya
- Past members: Jinky Vidal; Joshua Desiderio; Mike Luis; Tat Suzara; Gerald Banzon; Ava Santos; Rommel dela Cruz; Bobby Velasco; Joel Guarin; Gino Aguas; Nikki Cabardo; Carlo Tapia; Obet Luzon; Tzuki Garcia; Jun Masamayor; Lerod Cailao
- Website: https://freestylephilippines.com/

Freestyle is a pop/R&B band formed in Davao City, Philippines in 1996 currently fronted by Top Suzara since 2022, who returned seventeen years after he initially left in 2005. The band was formed in 1996, hit the mainstream in 1998 and popular for the songs "Before I Let You Go", "So Slow", "This Time", "Till I Found You", "Para Sa 'Yo", "Once in a Lifetime" and their rendition of "Bakit Ngayon Ka Lang?" with Pops Fernandez.

== Background ==
The band was originally founded by former guitarist Richard Felix "Tat" Suzara in Davao City. Two of the most notable members of the classic lineup include vocalists Jinky Vidal and Top Suzara, the band's primary songwriter, who left the band in 2011 and 2005 respectively and went on to have solo careers. Post-Freestyle, Vidal and Top Suzara had a reunion concert together in 2013. Other notable band members were vocalists Joshua Desiderio, Mike Luis, Ava Santos, and drummer Gerald Banzon who were with the band until Top Suzara returned and took over in 2022.

In mid-2022, after the pre-"Top Suzara-comeback" lineup disbanded, Suzara took over and continued the "Freestyle" brand accompanied by his own all-male session musicians. Suzara had his first comeback performance as Freestyle at 19 East in October 2022 in a sold-out gig. Suzara also trademarked "Freestyle" in the Intellectual Property Office (IPO) solely under his name. The IPO ruled that "Freestyle" is synonymous with the name Top Suzara and is deemed the rightful owner.

== Members ==
=== Current members ===
- Christopher "Top" Suzara – vocals/guitar/chief songwriter (1997–2005; 2022–present)
- IJ Garcia – keyboards/vocals/musical director (2022–present)
- Ian Tan – bass/vocals (2022–present)
- Bouy Manalo – guitar/vocals (2022–present)
- Gibson Viduya – drums/vocals (2024–present)

=== Former members ===
- Jinky Vidal – vocals (1996–2011)
- Joshua Desiderio – vocals/keyboards/guitars (2005–2021)
- Mike Luis – vocals/keyboards (2005–2022)
- Tat Suzara – lead guitar/backing vocals/founder (1996–2019)
- Gerald Banzon – drums/percussion (1997–2021)
- Ava Santos – female vocals (2012–2022)
- Rommel dela Cruz – bass guitar (2005–2019)
- Bobby Velasco – keyboards/arranger (2018–2022)
- Joel Guarin – bass guitar (2019–2022)
- Gino Aguas – lead guitar (2019–2022)
- Nikki Cabardo – keyboards (2000–2009)
- Carlo Tapia – bass guitar (1996–2005)
- Obet Luzon – keyboards (1996–2000)
- Tzuki Garcia – drums/percussion (1996–1997)
- Jun Masamayor – keyboards (1996–1997)
- Lerod Cailao – drums/vocals (2022–2024)

Additional band personnel history footnotes:
- Vocalist Top Suzara is the cousin of lead founding member Tat Suzara.
- Former Viva Hot Babe Sheree, relative of Jinky Vidal, was once a touring vocalist.
- Philippine Idol finalist Gail Blanco also guested as a touring vocalist.
- Filipina Dutch singer Aliya Parcs also once guested as a backing vocalist in some selected shows.
- Lead founding member Tat Suzara happens to be the ex-husband of another former member and vocalist, Jinky Vidal. Vidal and Tat got separated and eventually annulled in 2013. Vidal is now in a common-law partnership and has a child with singer/songwriter X Factor finalist Jeric Medina who is 16 years her junior.
- Session musician Bogs Bautista toured with the band as drummer/percussionist from 2021–2022 when long-time drummer Gerald Banzon left in 2021.
- Filipino-American singer/performer/educator, Hawaii Stars 1995 finalist, David Greenbaum from San Francisco, CA., performed with Freestyle when the band was based in Davao in 1996.

== Discography ==
=== Studio albums ===
Artist	Album	Tracks	Year	Records
Freestyle	Freestyle	Goodluv; Not That Easy; Wanna Be The One; Lover; Before I Let You Go; Let's Get It On; I'm Gonna Love You; So Slow; Treat You So Right; Get With Me; Bakit Iniwan Na?	1998	Viva Records
Freestyle	This Time	Down And Funky; Take A Little Time 'Til I Found You; This Time; Love Is Here; Missing You; Para Sa 'Yo; You; Love Is Here; Don't Go; My Way, Your Way; Make Love; You Wanna Be With Me	2000	Viva Records
Freestyle	I Wanna Get Close	Mr. What I Wanna Be; You've Taken Over Me; Lying To Myself; To Love Me; I Like The Way; All That I Want; Nakilala; It's Got To Be Love; Paano; I Wanna Get Close (feat. Kyla); I Like The Way (Dance Remix)	2002	Viva Records
Freestyle	Once in a Lifetime	Sa Ayaw Mo't Sa Gusto; Right By Your Side; Hindi Na Ba Pwede; Mananatili; Sa 'Yo; I'll Wait For You; Once In A Lifetime; Forever Loving You; When Hello Means Goodbye; Hanap Ka	2004	Viva Records
Freestyle	Back at the Yard	Tameme; Naglalambing; Muling Ibalik; Mapipigil Mo Ba? Dati; I Will Still Love You; Paper Rain; Is It Over? Wonder; Rainbow Coloured Sky; Bawat Tao; Wrapped Around Your Fingers; Maybe; Sugar; Bakit Kaya? Nananabik	2007	Viva Records
Freestyle	Playlist	I Will Survive; There's No Easy Way; Got To Be There; Suddenly; I Live For Your Love; Take Me I'll Follow; Don't Let Me Be Lonely; Sara; Love's Holiday 'Till I Loved You; Sweet Baby; Easy; I Can't Find The Words To Say Goodbye; Truly	2009	Viva Records
Freestyle	Mga Kwentong Kinanta	True Love; Paputol Putol; Kulang Ang Mga Sandali; Isang Halik; Bangon; Kahapon; Kung Di Rin Lang Ikaw; Paano Nga Kaya; Pasensya; Mahal	2014	Freestyle Music Philippines

=== Compilation albums ===
Artist	Album	Tracks	Year	Records
Freestyle	Greatest Hits	Before I Let You Go; Bakit Iniwan Na? This Time; I Wanna Get Close; Missing You 'Till I Found You; Mananatili; Good Luv; So Slow; Para Sa 'Yo; Paano? Treat You So Right; Once In A Lifetime; Down And Funky; Bakit Ngayon Ka Lang? (feat. Pops Fernandez); Love Medley (Weak, Incomplete, 6-8-12, I'd Still Say Yes)	2005	Viva Records
Freestyle	Silver Series	So Slow; Mananatili; Let's Get It On; Before I Let You Go; Nakilala; This Time; Get With Me; Missing You; I Like The Way; Bakit Iniwan Na? Incomplete (feat. Zsa Zsa Padilla); OPM Medley (When I Met You, Bakit Ba Ganyan, I Think I'm In Love)	2006	Viva Records
Freestyle	18 Greatest Hits	Bakit Iniwan Na? Before I Let You Go; Half Crazy; Mananatili; So Slow; Bakit Ngayon Ka Lang? One Hello; Still; Maybe; Down And Funky; I Wanna Get Close; Paano? I Just Can't Stop Loving You; Ebony And Ivory; Good Luv; Treat You So Right; Once In A Lifetime; I Don't Want To Lose You	2009	Viva Records

=== Collaboration albums ===
- Closer to Home (Viva Records, 1999)
- Closer to Home 2 (Viva Records, 2000)
- Servant of All Jubilaeum A.D. 2000 (Viva Records, 2000)
- Tunog Acoustic 1 (Warner Music Philippines, 2003)
- Acoustic Lokal (Viva Records, 2003)
- Senti: 18 Pinoy Love Hits (Viva Records & Vicor Music, 2008)
- Senti Dos (Viva Records & Vicor Music, 2008)
- Hit Covers (Viva Records & Vicor Music, 2009)
- Senti 3 (Viva Records & Vicor Music, 2009)
- Simly Fied (More Than Acoustic) (Viva Records & Vicor Music, 2009)
- Senti Four: It's Complicated

(Viva Records & Vicor Music, 2010)

- Sing-along with Freestyle

(Viva Records 2001)

=== Live albums ===
- Freestyle Live (2000)
- The Love Concert: The Album (2001)
- All Hits Live at the Araneta (2003)
- Live @ 19 East (2006)

=== DVDs ===
- Freestyle Live (2000)
- The Love Concert: The Album (2001)
- All Hits Live at the Araneta (2003)
- Live @ 19 East (2006)

== Singles ==
=== Original ===
- Bakit Iniwan Na (1998, also covered by Soapdish Band from their various artist compilation album, “Hopia Mani Popcorn Vol. 3” released in 2026)
- Before I Let You Go (1998)
- Bes Pren (2024)
- So Slow (1998)
- This Time (2000, also covered by Nadine Lustre & James Reid)

=== Covers ===
- Bakit Ngayon Ka Lang (Original by Asia's songwriter Ogie Alcasid)
- Half Crazy (2006, original by Johnny Gill)
- Paano (Original by Gary V. & not to be confused with the original song by APO)
- We Are Gifts (2000, original by Bukas Pala Music Ministry & Also The 1st gospel song of Freestyle Band & released from "Servant Of All" Catholic album by Viva Records)

== Awards and nominations ==
Year	Award giving body	Category	Nominated work	Results
2008	Awit Awards	Best R&B Recording	"Rainbow Coloured Sky"	Nominated
