= Secondhand Serenade =

American rock band

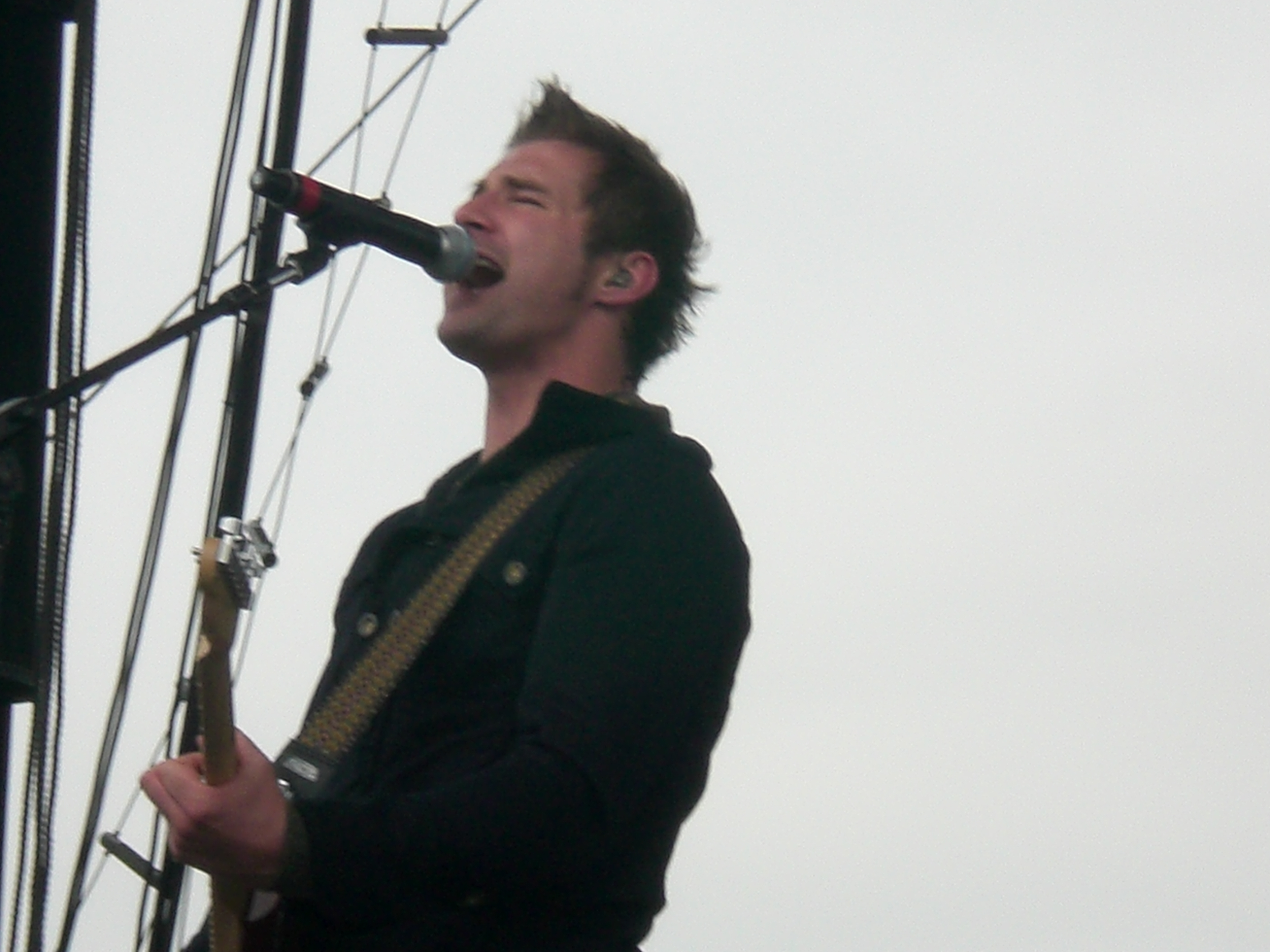
- Secondhand Serenade performing at Bamboozle in 2007

Background information
- Origin: Menlo Park, California, U.S.
- Genres: Pop rock, emo, emo pop, acoustic rock
- Years active: 2004–present
- Label: Glassnote
- Website: secondhandserenade.us

Secondhand Serenade is the solo project of American rock musician John Vesely. Vesely has released four studio albums to date under the name Secondhand Serenade. His debut album used multitrack recording to create the sound of a band using technology, while his second album took a different path, using a proper band and synthesizers.

Secondhand Serenade's early releases are now considered classics in the 2000s emo scene. Kerrang! classified Secondhand Serenade as a "MySpace band".

== History ==
=== Early years, first release (2004–2006) ===
John Vesely (born February 5, 1982) started performing as Secondhand Serenade in his home town of Menlo Park in California in 2004. Vesely was raised in the San Francisco Bay Area as the son of a jazz musician. He started getting into music at the age of 12. He spent 8 years playing bass in local bands, featuring in a number of acts ranging in style from ska and hardcore to rock and pop. One of the bands he played in, Sounds Like Life, included Ronnie Day. After years of playing bass, he opted for acoustic guitar. Vesely follows in the tradition of John Ondrasik's Five for Fighting. Vesely was also the son of a Czech immigrant. Vesely found success as Secondhand Serenade.

Vesely once said "in some ways a band is more powerful, but in other ways there are things you can do with one voice and one acoustic guitar that you couldn't do with an army of musicians behind you."

In late 2005, Vesely released his debut album titled Awake. It was recorded as a demo, after booking a few days at a San Francisco studio earlier in 2005, "using just an acoustic guitar and his multi-tracked vocals." The album was promoted through the Secondhand Serenade MySpace page and by playing local shows. The CDs were originally sold through mail order with a PayPal account by Vesely, eventually he signed up with distributor TuneCore, making Secondhand Serenade's songs available on music portals including iTunes. The album experienced tremendous online support, and by the end of 2006 Secondhand Serenade had received millions of plays on MySpace and had been the social-networking site's No. 1 Independent Artist for months. Financially, he was said to be bringing in up to $20,000 a month from downloads and merchandise sales out of his home. He sold over 15,000 copies of the album on his own, and on the strength of these sales and the support, the labels became interested in him. Secondhand Serenade was signed by longtime label executive Daniel Glass, on his new label Glassnote Records, which is distributed through Warner's Independent Label Group. In 2006, Rolling Stone announced Secondhand Serenade as No. 3 in the magazine's reader's poll for Best MySpace Artist.

=== Awake re-release (2007) ===
In early 2007, Awake was reissued by Glassnote Records with an additional two songs. It was released on February 6 and gave Vesely his first chartings, debuting at number 16 on Billboard's Top Heatseekers chart. Added success led to it peaking at number 164 on the Billboard 200, number 3 on the Top Heatseekers and number 19 on the Independent Albums chart.

In support of his first label release, Vesely was featured on MTV's You Hear It First, AOL Music's Breakers Yahoo! Music's Who's Next? and appeared on talk show Late Night with Conan O'Brien. He also played numerous shows, including tours with Hawthorne Heights and The All-American Rejects and at music festivals South by Southwest and alongside My Chemical Romance and Linkin Park at The Bamboozle.

Secondhand Serenade released only one song as a single from the debut album, "Vulnerable". The song spawned a music video, which was created by Frank Borin, who was responsible for the Red Hot Chili Peppers video for hit single "Dani California". "Vulnerable" peaked at No. 83 on the Billboard Hot 100, No. 64 on the Pop 100 and No. 56 on the Hot Digital Songs charts.

=== A Twist in My Story (2008–2009) ===
A Twist in My Story was released on February 19, 2008, and features songs from Awake such as "Maybe" and "Your Call," but reproduced with a full band. The bulk of the album however is a list of new songs written by Vesely and recorded with a full band. Two tracks on A Twist in My Story were produced by famed producer Butch Walker, while the others were produced by former Nine Inch Nails member Danny Lohner. The first single, "Fall for You," was released January 21, 2008. The album was leaked, and was made available for download one month before its official release. On January 28, 2008, the music video for the first single from the album "Fall for You" premiered on the MTV show TRL. In support of the release, Secondhand Serenade spent most of March and April touring with American bands Making April, Automatic Loveletter and The White Tie Affair. Members of his touring band include Steve Shebby on bass guitar, Lukas Vesely (Vesely's brother) on keys, Ryan Cook (former bassist of the White Tie Affair) on lead guitar, and Tom Breyfogle on drums.

The title A Twist in My Story is a reference to Vesely's 2008 divorce from Candice, with whom he has two young sons. Vesely had separated with Candice in August 2007, the time when the tracks for A Twist in My Story were being created.

In November 2008 the album's first single "Fall for You", was certified Platinum by the RIAA. As of December 5, 2008 "Fall for You" was still No. 13 on the American Top 40 songs in the country.

The deluxe edition of A Twist in My Story was released on February 3, 2009. It contains 5 bonus tracks including radio version of "Your Call", acoustic version of "Fall for You", acoustic version of "Like a Knife", his single "Last Time", and the Coldplay cover "Fix You".

=== Hear Me Now and Weightless EP (2010–2011) ===
Secondhand Serenade's third studio album Hear Me Now, was released on August 3, 2010. In an interview, Vesely stated that the album would be more upbeat than his last album, which focused on relationships. On June 1, "Something More" was released onto iTunes as a deluxe single with a bonus track "You Are a Drug", a video showing the making of "Something More", and a digital booklet to the new single.

The vocals of Juliet Simms from American rock band Automatic Loveletter were featured on the song "Hear Me Now" and the cover of "Fix You", originally performed by British rock band Coldplay.

On May 3, 2011, Vesely released an EP titled Weightless.

=== Departure from Glassnote and Undefeated (2012–2015) ===
In January 2012 Vesely started a PledgeMusic campaign to fund his next album.

During the summer of 2012, Vesely recorded an acoustic remake of A Twist in My Story. In July 2012, the release date and the title of the remake were announced by Vesely and it should be released on iTunes and Amazon as download. One week before the official release some sample of "Suppose", "Stranger", "Like a Knife", and his new recorded song "Belong To" were released on SoundCloud site.

On September 11, 2012, Vesely released the acoustic remake of his older album A Twist in My Story called A Naked Twist in My Story. After this release Vesely goes back to the studio to record his new album with producer/engineer Brandon Metcalf in Nashville, TN.

On February 26, 2013, the single "Shake It Off" was released to start promoting the new album. Vesely explained the concept of "Shake It Off" in a 2013 interview with Musichel, ""Shake It Off" is a song about putting everyday problems behind you and staying positive. I really thought it was time for me to write a feel good song and I couldn't be happier with how it turned out."

On a videochat on Spreecast, Vesely announced the official title of the new album: Undefeated.

=== The Rebel Roads (2015) ===
On April 24, 2015, Vesely proposed to Veronica Ballestrini on stage at his show in Las Vegas, Nevada. The two met at Destiny Records in Nashville to do three acoustic duets for his album Undefeated, "Heart Stops (By the Way)", "La La Love" and "Nothing Left To Say" back in February 2013. Ballestrini later went on tour with him starting on March 8 in Lexington, Kentucky and ended on April 10 in West Hollywood, California. They developed a relationship on March 22, 2013. Vesely married his second wife Veronica on April 1, 2017, in Vero Beach, Florida. The duo started a collaboration act as the Rebel Roads and released their single "First to Know" on iTunes on December 2, 2016.

In 2015, Secondhand Serenade appeared on Blues Traveler's album Blow Up the Moon, co writing the song "Hearts Are Still Awake" and singing the song "The Darkness We All Need".

=== Awake: Remixed & Remastered, 10 Years & 10,000 Tears Later (2017) ===
On February 10, 2017, Secondhand Serenade released Awake: Remixed & Remastered, 10 Years & 10,000 Tears Later. Produced and distributed by Glassnote Records, a compilation including two new songs: "Don't Look Down" and "Lost".

== Discography ==
=== Studio albums ===
List of studio albums, with selected chart positions
| Title | Details | Peak chart positions | | | |
| Title | Details | US | US Heat | US Indie | US Rock |
|---|---|---|---|---|---|
| Awake | Released: February 6, 2007; Label: Glassnote | 164 | 3 | 19 | — |
| A Twist in My Story | Released: February 19, 2008; Label: Glassnote | 44 | — | 6 | 11 |
| Hear Me Now | Released: August 3, 2010; Label: Glassnote | 42 | — | 7 | 14 |
| Undefeated | Released: October 27, 2014; Label: Self-released | — | — | — | — |
"—" denotes a recording that did not chart or was not released in that territory.

=== Other albums ===
List of demos and special releases
| Title | Details |
|---|---|
| Awake | Released: October 27, 2005; Label: Self-released |
| A Naked Twist in My Story | Released: September 11, 2012; Label: Self-released |
| Awake: Remixed & Remastered, 10 Years & 10,000 Tears Later | Released: February 10, 2017; Label: Glassnote |

=== Extended plays ===
List of extended plays, with selected chart positions
| Title | Details | Peak chart positions | |
| Title | Details | US Indie | US Top Current |
|---|---|---|---|
| Weightless | Released: May 3, 2011; Label: Glassnote | 33 | 188 |

=== Singles ===
List of singles, with selected chart positions and certifications, showing year released and album name
| Title | Year | Peak chart positions | | | | | | Certifications | Album |
| Title | Year | US | US Adult | US Pop | AUS | CAN | JPN | Certifications | Album |
|---|---|---|---|---|---|---|---|---|---|
| "Vulnerable" | 2007 | 83 | — | 64 | — | — | — | | Awake |
| "Fall for You" | 2008 | 21 | 12 | 6 | 19 | 36 | 65 | RIAA: 2× Platinum; ARIA: Gold | A Twist in My Story |
| "A Twist in My Story" | 2008 | — | — | — | — | — | — | | A Twist in My Story |
| "Last Time" | 2008 | — | — | — | — | — | — | | A Twist in My Story |
| "Your Call" | 2008 | — | — | — | — | — | — | | A Twist in My Story |
| "Something More" | 2010 | — | — | — | — | — | — | | Hear Me Now |
| "Shake It Off" | 2013 | — | — | — | — | — | — | | Undefeated |
| "Lost" | 2017 | — | 32 | — | — | — | — | | Awake: Remixed & Remastered, 10 Years & 10,000 Tears Later |
| "Edge of a Riot" | 2019 | — | — | — | — | — | — | | Non-album singles |
| "Find Somebody Else" | 2019 | — | — | — | — | — | — | | Non-album singles |
| "Not Enough" | 2019 | — | — | — | — | — | — | | Non-album singles |
"—" denotes a single that did not chart or was not released in that territory.
