= Awake (Secondhand Serenade album) =

Studio album by Secondhand Serenade
- Released: February 6, 2007
- Studio: SF Soundworks
- Genres: Acoustic rock; emo
- Length: 47:35
- Label: Glassnote

Secondhand Serenade chronology
Awake (2007)	A Twist in My Story (2008)

Singles from Awake
- 1. "Vulnerable" Released: April 16, 2007

Professional ratings
Review scores
Source	Rating
AllMusic	3/5 stars
AbsolutePunk	(70%)

Awake is the debut studio album by the American acoustic rock musician John Vesely working under the pseudonym Secondhand Serenade. The album was originally created as a demo in 2005, and was made available for purchase on MySpace and iTunes. In late 2006 after selling 15,000 copies of it, Secondhand Serenade signed to the label Glassnote Records and released the album on February 6, 2007, adding the songs "It's Not Over" and "Stay Close, Don't Go".

== Glassnote release ==
In early 2007, the album was issued by Glassnote Records with an additional two songs. It was released on February 6 and gave Vesely his first chartings, debuting at number 16 on Billboard's Top Heatseekers chart. Added success lead to it peaking at number 164 on the Billboard 200, number 3 on the Top Heatseekers and number 19 on the Top Independent Albums chart.

== Single ==
Secondhand Serenade released only one song as a single from the debut album, "Vulnerable". The song spawned a music video, which was created by Frank Borin who was responsible for Red Hot Chili Peppers video for hit single "Dani California". "Vulnerable" peaked at number 83 on the Billboard Hot 100, number 64 on the Pop 100 and number 56 on the Hot Digital Songs charts.

== Track listing ==
All tracks are written by John Vesely, except where noted.

No.	Title	Writer(s)	Length
1.	"Half Alive"		3:43
2.	"Broken"	Vesely; Ronnie Day	3:53
3.	"Vulnerable"		3:22
4.	"Your Call" (acoustic version)	Vesely; Day	3:44
5.	"Maybe" (acoustic version)		3:32
6.	"It's Not Over"		3:28
7.	"I Hate This Song"		4:38
8.	"Awake"	Vesely; Day	4:04
9.	"Take Me with You"		4:53
10.	"Let It Roll"		3:27
11.	"The Last Song Ever"		4:38
12.	"End"	Vesely; Day	4:13
Total length:			47:35

Bonus tracks
No.	Title	Length
13.	"Stay Close, Don't Go"	3:34
Total length:		51:09

== Credits ==
- John Vesely – guitar, vocals
- Ronnie Day – piano (tracks 4, 8 and 12)
- Rachel Allgood, Adam Munoz – engineering
- Loredanna Palomares, Aaron DeMateo – engineering assistance
- Tony Espinoza, Loredana Palomares – mastering
- Tracked, mixed and mastered at SF Soundworks
