= Cedric Escobar =

Filipino singer-songwriter

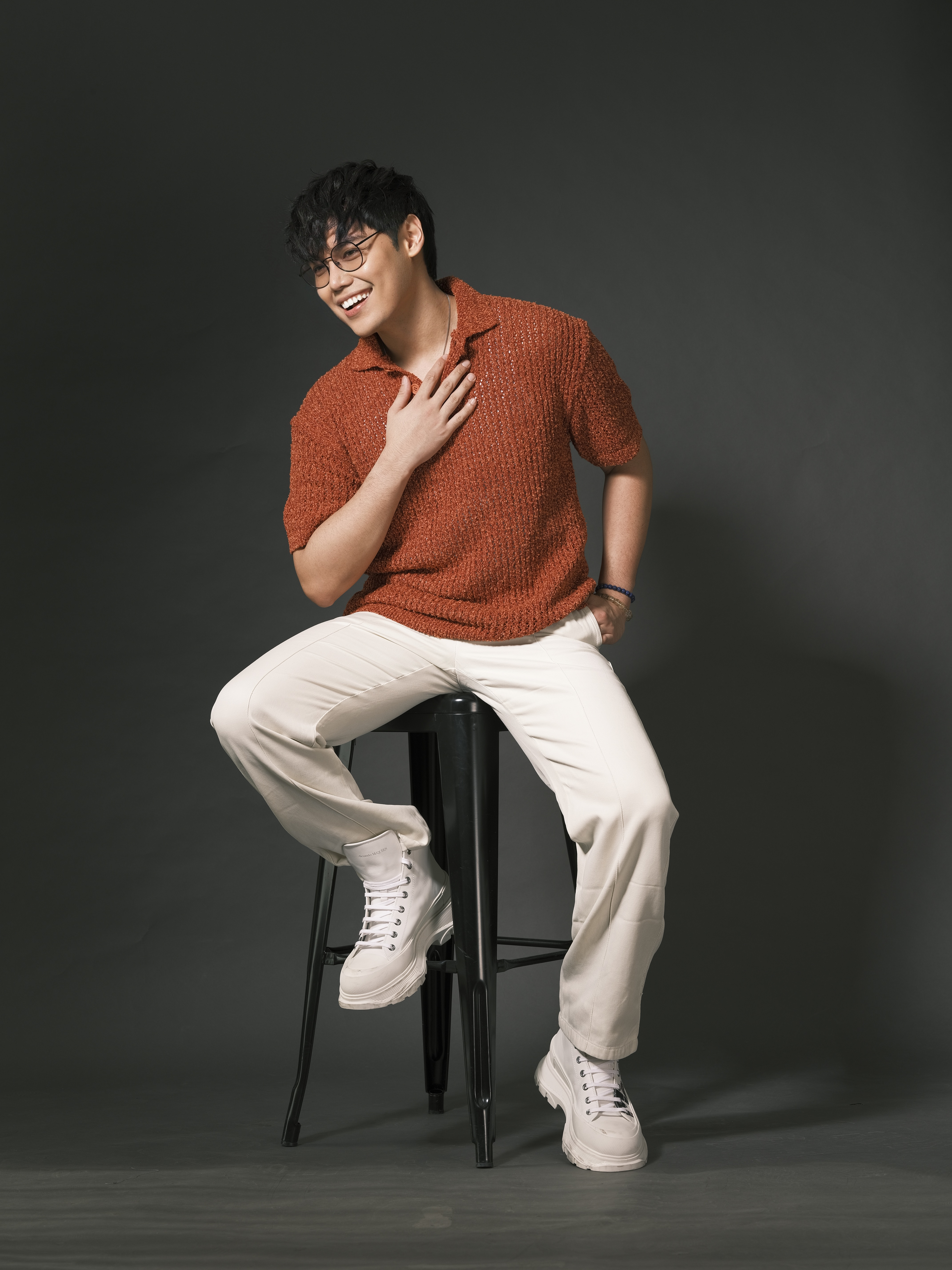
- Cedric Escobar in 2024

Background information
- Born: c. 2000; New York City, United States
- Origin: Philippines / United States
- Genres: Pop, R&B, OPM
- Occupation(s): Singer, songwriter
- Years active: 2021–present
- Labels: PolyEast Records

Cedric Escobar (born c. 2000) is a Filipino singer-songwriter based in New York City. He is known for his performances in the Original Pilipino Music (OPM) scene, his singles such as "'di Na Ba?" and "Gasera", and his recognition at the Awit Awards, where he won Favorite New Solo Artist in 2024.

== Early life ==
Escobar was raised in New York, United States, where he was exposed to Filipino music, television, and films that influenced his interest in singing.

== Career ==
=== Early career ===
Escobar began performing as a front act for established Filipino artists in North America, including joining the OPM Summer Fest 2023, where he performed in U.S. and Canadian cities alongside Rivermaya, Gloc-9, Introvoys, and KZ Tandingan.

=== Recording and singles ===
In 2023, Escobar signed with PolyEast Records. He released the single "'di Na Ba?", written by his mentor Paco Arespacochaga, which marked his transition from covers to original music. His other songs include "Gasera", "Wag Ka Nang Umiyak", "Got to Believe in Magic", and "Pelikula". He also issued an EP, Mellow (Live Recordings), which features renditions of well-known OPM tracks.

== Awards and nominations ==
Year	Award	Category	Work	Result	Ref
2024	Awit Awards	Favorite New Solo Artist	—	Won	
2024	Awit Awards	Best Performance by a New Solo Artist	"Gasera"	Nominated	

== Discography ==
=== Singles ===
- "'di Na Ba?" (2023)
- "Gasera" (2023)
- "Wag Ka Nang Umiyak" (2023)
- "Got to Believe in Magic" (2024)
- "Pelikula" (2024)

=== Extended plays ===
- Mellow (Live Recordings) (2023)
