= The X Factor Philippines season 1 =

Philippine music competition

The X Factor Philippines
- Season 1
- Hosted by: KC Concepcion
- Judges: Charice; Gary Valenciano; Pilita Corrales; Martin Nievera
- Winner: KZ Tandingan
- Runners-up: Gabriel Maturan
- Finals venue: PAGCOR Grand Theater, Parañaque City

Release
- Original network: ABS-CBN
- Original release: June 23 – October 14, 2012

The X Factor Philippines is a Philippine music competition to find a new singing talent. The first season began on June 23, 2012. KC Concepcion is the host of the show, while the judging panel consist of Charice, Gary Valenciano, Pilita Corrales, and Martin Nievera.

The show is mainly based on the original British format. The competition consists of auditions, in front of the shows producers and then the judges with a live audience. It is then followed by the bootcamp, judges' home visit and then through the live finals, the winner of which receives a 4 million peso recording contract with Star Records.

The finals were held on October 7, 2012, and aired live from the PAGCOR Grand Theater in Parañaque, Metro Manila, with KZ Tandingan from Charice's category declared as the winner of the competition. On the other hand, Martin Nievera's Gabriel Maturan of his Boys category came in as runner-up, while Daddy's Home of Gary Valenciano's Group category came in third place.

The show ended on October 14, 2012, airing two special episodes after the finals.

== Selection process ==
=== Auditions ===
Cities where the major auditions were held.

Auditions started in October 2011. Initial auditions are held in cities, provinces and towns in the Philippines like Laoag, Vigan, La Union, Baguio, Cagayan, Isabela, Nueva Ecija, Pampanga, Tarlac, Zambales, Manila, Cavite, Occidental Mindoro, Palawan, Quezon, Albay, Camarines Norte, Camarines Sur, Masbate, Sorsogon, Marinduque, Aklan, Capiz, Iloilo, Negros Oriental, Leyte, Zamboanga del Norte, Zamboanga del Sur, Bukidnon, Misamis Occidental, General Santos, Koronadal, Lanao del Norte, Maguindanao, Agusan del Norte and Surigao del Norte.

Major auditions were held in key cities from different parts of the country such as Baguio, Dagupan, Batangas, Quezon City, Naga, Iloilo, Bacolod, Cebu, Cagayan de Oro and Davao. More than 20,000 people auditioned for the first season of The X Factor Philippines.

The auditions were aired from June 23, 2012 until July 15, 2012. Footage from the Visayas auditions were first aired during the first week, followed by the Luzon auditions, the NCR auditions, and lastly, the Mindanao auditions.

=== Bootcamp ===
The bootcamp stage was held at the PAGCOR Grand Theater in Parañaque, Metro Manila. The bootcamp stage was broadcast in two episodes on July 21 and 22. The first day of bootcamp saw the judges split the 172 hopeful acts into four groups, namely: the Boys (solo male acts from ages 16–25 yrs old), the Girls (solo female acts from ages 16–25 yrs old), the Over 25s (solo acts from ages 26 yrs old and above), and the Groups. All of the groups received vocal coaching from resident mentors, and each later performed one song. The Boys sang "Tuwing Umuulan at Kapiling Ka" by Basil Valdez; the Girls with "Without You" by David Guetta; the Over 25s with "It's My Life" by Bon Jovi; and the Groups with "Edge of Glory" by Lady Gaga. At the end of the day, the number of acts was cut to 68. On the second day, acts were given dance coaching by resident dance coach, Joane Laygo. At noon, for the dance challenge, the judges announced that no one will be eliminated. The acts were given the last challenge, of which they will sing a song they personally picked. At the end of the day, 20 acts made it to the next round, while one group was formed, Lucky Girls, made up of 6 solo female acts that didn't make it through namely: Alyssa Quijano, Auriette Divina, Monique Lualhati, Katrina Velarde, Jhelsea Flores and Ashley Campbell.

=== Judges' home visit ===
The judges' home visit was the last stage of the selection process. The episodes were aired on July 28 and 29. During this stage, it was revealed that Nievera would mentor the Boys, Charice would mentor the Girls, Corrales would mentor the Over 25s, and Valenciano would mentor the Groups. The final selection process was aided by a guest judge per category. Journey lead vocalist Arnel Pineda joined Nievera at Club Balai Isabel in Batangas, former semi-finalist Cheesa from the second season of the American version of The Voice joined Charice at The Bellevue Hotel in Alabang, Muntinlupa, Rico J. Puno joined Corrales in Manila, and Jed Madela joined Valenciano at Tagaytay Highlands in Tagaytay. At judges' houses each act performed a song they personally picked and performed it in front of their mentor and his/her guest judge.

The eight acts failed to make the Top 12 and were eliminated:

- Boys: Anton Paolo Antenorcruz, Michael Pangilinan
- Girls: Abigail Mendoza, Angelica Prado
- Over 25s: Paulo Castro, Cristine Ledesma
- Groups: 5th Avids, Sweet Bliss

== Contestants ==
The top 12 contestants were confirmed as follows;

Key:

– Winner
– Runner-up
– Third place
– Eliminated in the Live Shows

Category (mentor)	Acts		
Boys (Nievera)	Kedebon Colim	Gabriel Maturan	Jeric Medina
Girls (Charice)	Allen Sta. Maria	KZ Tandingan	Jerrianne Templo
Over 25s (Corrales)	Joan Da	Mark Mabasa	Modesto Taran
Groups (Valenciano)	A.K.A. Jam	Daddy's Home	Takeoff

== Live shows ==
The X Factor Live show with presenter KC Concepcion.

The live shows began on August 4, 2012 in PAGCOR Grand Theater in Parañaque, Metro Manila. Each week, the top acts performances took place on Saturday nights, while the results are announced during Sunday nights. Each week has a different set of theme. Often during results nights, guests are invited live to perform; while the remaining acts during results nights also feature group performances.

Sam Milby performed during the first results night, with special numbers from Gary Valenciano's children Paolo and Kiana Valenciano, and former X Factor auditionees' West Track Boys and Rodrigo Lozon. During the end of the second performance night, it was announced that Xian Lim, Kean Cipriano, and Tutti Caringal would perform in the second results night. However, during the airing of the results night, the three did not appear for unknown reasons. Jovit Baldivino and Yeng Constantino performed during the third results night and gave a special birthday tribute to Pilita Corrales; while Star Power's grand champion, Angeline Quinto, performed on the fourth results night. Pepe Smith, the living legend of Pinoy rock, performed on the fifth results night. While Dingdong Avanzado, Gino Padilla, and Randy Santiago, three of the most famous OPM 80s icons, performed on the sixth results night. In the seventh performance night, L.A. Dancers, an American dance group, made a special dance number from the song of Rihanna's "Where Have You Been" during the start of the show. During the seventh results night, pinoy band vocalists' Kean Cipriano, Ney Dimaculangan, and Tutti Caringal joined the remaining 6 acts in a tribute production number to pinoy rock band icons, the Eraserheads and Rivermaya. Richard Poon, Duncan Ramos, and Aiza Seguerra performed an opening number during the eighth performance night; while Khalil Ramos and Daniel Padilla, two of the main casts of the Princess and I, serenade the audiences during the eighth results night. On the ninth performance night, Toni Gonzaga performed an opening number, and was followed by Pilipinas Got Talent's El Gamma Penumbra who performed a shadow theatrical routine midway during the show.

The Live finals were held on October 6 & 7, 2012, at the PAGCOR Grand Theater in Parañaque, Metro Manila. In the final performance night, Lani Misalucha graced and opened the show singing her own rendition of Dynamite, a song popularized by Taio Cruz. Vina Morales, winner of Ikon ASEAN 2007, performed a medley of songs of Jennifer Lopez midway during the show. While Nina, Rico J. Puno, and Bamboo Mañalac had a duet with Daddy's Home, KZ Tandingan, and Gabriel Maturan respectively.

In the final results night, KC Concepcion opened the show, singing Nicole Scherzinger's song called Wet. ASAP's Champions' Erik Santos, Jed Madela, Jovit Baldivino, and Angeline Quinto performed a special number with the Top 3 acts. Pooh, April Boy Regino, and K Brosas had a special song number with former acts, Kedebon Colim, and Modesto Taran, and former auditionee Osang respectively. Yeng Constantino performed a number with the Top 5 acts. Also, The X Factor Philippines Top 12 acts sang "Bro, Ikaw ang Star ng Pasko", the Christmas Station ID theme song of ABS-CBN in 2009 and part of the recently released The X Factor Philippines album in iTunes Philippines. Also, the mentor-judges' Charice, Gary Valenciano, Martin Nievera, and Pilita Corrales performed a special number singing one of their famous songs.

=== Results summary ===
Color key

–	Contestant received the most public votes
–	Contestant was proclaimed as runner-up/third place
–	Contestant was in the bottom two and had to sing again in a final showdown

Weekly results per contestant
Contestant	Week 1	Week 2	Week 3	Week 4	Week 5	Week 6	Week 7	Week 8	Week 9	Week 10
KZ Tandingan	2nd	5th	2nd	1st	3rd	2nd	2nd	1st	3rd	Winner; 54.77%
Gabriel Maturan	4th	7th	3rd	4th	1st	1st	4th	2nd	2nd	Runner-up; 32.33%
Daddy's Home	3rd	6th	9th 5.53%	5th	2nd	3rd	6th	4th 19.63%	1st	Third Place; 12.90%
Allen Sta. Maria	6th	9th	1st	3rd	4th	6th	3rd	3rd	4th	Eliminated (Week 9)
Jeric Medina	1st	1st	5th	2nd	5th	4th	1st	5th 16.74%	Eliminated (Week 8)	
Kedebon Colim	5th	8th	4th	6th	6th	5th	5th	Eliminated (Week 7)		
Joan Da	11th	4th	7th	7th	7th 9.99%	7th	Eliminated (Week 6)			
Takeoff	7th	10th 3.90%	6th	9th	8th 6.99%	Eliminated (Week 5)				
Modesto Taran	8th	2nd	8th	8th	Eliminated (Week 4)					
A.K.A. Jam	10th	3rd	10th 4.42%	Eliminated (Week 3)						
Mark Mabasa	9th	11th 3.72%	Eliminated (Week 2)							
Jerrianne Templo	12th	Eliminated (Week 1)								
Final showdown	Joan Da, Jerrianne Templo	Mark Mabasa, Takeoff	Daddy's Home, A.K.A. Jam	Modesto Taran, Takeoff	Joan Da, Takeoff	Joan Da, Allen Sta. Maria	Kedebon Colim, Daddy's Home	Daddy's Home, Jeric Medina	Allen Sta. Maria, KZ Tandingan	There were no final showdown or judges' vote for the results are based on public votes alone.
Nievera's vote to eliminate	Jerrianne Templo	Takeoff	Daddy's Home	Not required to vote^{1}	Joan Da	Joan Da	Kedebon Colim	Daddy's Home	Allen Sta. Maria	There were no final showdown or judges' vote for the results are based on public votes alone.
Charice's vote to eliminate	Joan Da	Mark Mabasa	Daddy's Home	Modesto Taran	Takeoff	Joan Da	Not required to vote^{2}	Jeric Medina	Not required to vote^{2}	There were no final showdown or judges' vote for the results are based on public votes alone.
Corrales' vote to eliminate	Jerrianne Templo	Takeoff	A.K.A. Jam	Modesto Taran	Takeoff	Allen Sta. Maria	Kedebon Colim	Daddy's Home	Allen Sta. Maria	There were no final showdown or judges' vote for the results are based on public votes alone.
Valenciano's vote to eliminate	Jerrianne Templo	Mark Mabasa	A.K.A. Jam	Modesto Taran	Joan Da	Joan Da	Kedebon Colim	Jeric Medina	Allen Sta. Maria	There were no final showdown or judges' vote for the results are based on public votes alone.
Eliminated	Jerrianne Templo; 3 of 4 votes Majority	Mark Mabasa; 2 of 4 votes Deadlock	A.K.A. Jam; 2 of 4 votes Deadlock	Modesto Taran; 3 of 3 votes Majority	Takeoff; 2 of 4 votes Deadlock	Joan Da; 3 of 4 votes Majority	Kedebon Colim; 3 of 3 votes Majority	Jeric Medina; 2 of 4 votes Deadlock	Allen Sta. Maria; 3 of 3 votes Majority	Gabriel Maturan; 32.33% to win
Eliminated	Jerrianne Templo; 3 of 4 votes Majority	Mark Mabasa; 2 of 4 votes Deadlock	A.K.A. Jam; 2 of 4 votes Deadlock	Modesto Taran; 3 of 3 votes Majority	Takeoff; 2 of 4 votes Deadlock	Joan Da; 3 of 4 votes Majority	Kedebon Colim; 3 of 3 votes Majority	Jeric Medina; 2 of 4 votes Deadlock	Allen Sta. Maria; 3 of 3 votes Majority	Daddy's Home; 12.90% to win
References										

Notes

1. Nievera was not required to vote because there was already a majority.
2. ^ ^{a} ^{b} Charice was not required to vote because there was already a majority.

=== Live show details ===
==== Week 1 (August 4 & 5) ====
- Theme: Songs from foreign and local movies
- Celebrity performer: Sam Milby
- Special guest performers: "Sana Maulit Muli" (performed by Paolo and Kiana Valenciano); "Hataw Na" and "Di Bale Nalang" (performed by West Track Boys & Rodrigo Lozon) - special tribute to Gary Valenciano
- Group performance: "Call Me Maybe" with Sam Milby

Lucky Girls' new name 'A.K.A. Jam' took effect from week 1.

Contestants' performances on the first live show
Act	Order	Song	Movie	Result
Takeoff	1	"Jailhouse Rock"	Jailhouse Rock	Safe
Allen Sta. Maria	2	"Keep Holding On"	Eragon	Safe
Gabriel Maturan	3	"It Will Rain"	The Twilight Saga: Breaking Dawn – Part 1	Safe
Modesto Taran	4	"Johnny B. Goode"	Back to the Future	Safe
Daddy's Home	5	"Till My Heartaches End"	Till My Heartaches End	Safe
KZ Tandingan	6	"The Show"	Angus, Thongs and Perfect Snogging	Safe
Jeric Medina	7	"Unchained Melody"	Ghost	Safe
Mark Mabasa	8	"Kiss from a Rose"	Batman Forever	Safe
A.K.A. Jam	9	"Got to Be Real"	The Pink Panther	Safe
Joan Da	10	"Sunday Morning"	Cheaper by the Dozen 2	Bottom two
Jerrianne Templo	11	"The First Time Ever I Saw Your Face"	Play Misty for Me	Bottom two
Kedebon Colim	12	"First Day High"	First Day High	Safe
Final showdown details
Joan Da	1	"Chasing Pavements"		Safe
Jerrianne Templo	2	"At Last"		Eliminated

Judges' vote to eliminate

- Charice: Joan Da – backed her own act, Jerrianne Templo
- Corrales: Jerrianne Templo – backed her own act, Joan Da
- Nievera: Jerriane Templo – gave no reason
- Valenciano: Jerrianne Templo – gave no reason

==== Week 2 (August 11 & 12) ====
- Theme: Songs with life or buhay in the title
- Group performance: "Overdrive" and "Pare Ko"

Contestants' performances on the second live show
Act	Order	Song	Result
Joan Da	1	"Gusto Ko Lamang Sa Buhay"	Safe
Gabriel Maturan	2	"One Day in Your Life"	Safe
Takeoff	3	"Larger than Life"	Bottom two
Allen Sta. Maria	4	"Bring Me to Life"	Safe
Modesto Taran	5	"Habang May Buhay"	Safe
Daddy's Home	6	"The Best Things In Life Are Free"	Safe
Kedebon Colim	7	"I Live My Life for You"	Safe
Mark Mabasa	8	"Got to Get You into My Life"	Bottom two
KZ Tandingan	9	"For Once in My Life"	Safe
Jeric Medina	10	"The Time of My Life"	Safe
A.K.A. Jam	11	"This Is My Life"	Safe
Final showdown details
Mark Mabasa	1	"There's No Easy Way"	Eliminated
Takeoff	2	"Fall for You"	Safe

Judges' vote to eliminate

- Corrales: Takeoff – backed her own act, Mark Mabasa
- Valenciano: Mark Mabasa – backed his own act, Takeoff
- Nievera: Takeoff – went with his gut feeling
- Charice: Mark Mabasa – couldn't make the decision on her own so put the decision to deadlock

With the judges deadlocked, Mark Mabasa was eliminated as the act with the fewest public vote.

==== Week 3 (August 18 & 19) ====
- Theme: Rock music
- Musical guest: Jovit Baldivino, Yeng Constantino
- Group performance: "The Candy Man" with Jovit Baldivino; "I Saw Her Standing There" with Yeng Constantino

Contestants' performances on the third live show
Act	Order	Song	Result
Kedebon Colim	1	"Footloose"	Safe
A.K.A. Jam	2	"Survivor"	Bottom two
Modesto Taran	3	"To Love Somebody"	Safe
Allen Sta. Maria	4	"Bitch"	Safe
Jeric Medina	5	"Lips of an Angel"	Safe
Daddy's Home	6	"Superstition"	Bottom two
Gabriel Maturan	7	"Breakeven"	Safe
Joan Da	8	"You Oughta Know"	Safe
Takeoff	9	"Makita Kang Muli"	Safe
KZ Tandingan	10	"In the End"	Safe
Final showdown details
Daddy's Home	1	"Maging Sino Ka Man"	Safe
A.K.A. Jam	2	"Officially Missing You"	Eliminated

Judges' vote to eliminate

- Charice: Daddy's Home – gave no reason
- Corrales: A.K.A Jam – gave no reason
- Nievera: Daddy's Home – gave no reason
- Valenciano: A.K.A. Jam – gave no reason

With the judges deadlocked, A.K.A. Jam was eliminated as the act with the fewest public vote.

==== Week 4 (August 25 & 26) ====
- Theme: Tribute to late music icons
- Musical guest: Angeline Quinto ("Don't Know What To Say")
- Group performance: "Kawawang Cowboy"; TBA with Angeline Quinto

Contestants' performances on the fourth live show
Act	Order	Song	Tribute To	Result
Modesto Taran	1	"Pure Imagination"	Lou Rawls	Bottom two
Daddy's Home	2	"All at Once"	Whitney Houston	Safe
Allen Sta. Maria	3	"Waterfalls"	Lisa Lopes	Safe
Jeric Medina	4	"Can't Help Falling in Love"	Elvis Presley	Safe
Joan Da	5	"(At Your Best) You Are Love"	Aaliyah	Safe
Kedebon Colim	6	"Yugyugan Na"	Karl Roy	Safe
Takeoff	7	"Dreaming of You"	Selena	Bottom two
KZ Tandingan	8	"Rehab"	Amy Winehouse	Safe
Gabriel Maturan	9	"Dance with My Father"	Luther Vandross	Safe
Final showdown details
Modesto Taran	1	"You'll Never Find Another Love Like Mine"		Eliminated
Takeoff	2	"Flying Without Wings"		Safe

Judges' vote to eliminate

- Valenciano: Modesto Taran – backed his own act, Takeoff
- Corrales: Modesto Taran – felt that Modesto Taran needed to be with his family
- Charice: Modesto Taran – felt that Modesto Taran needed to be with his family
- Nievera: was not required to vote since there was already a majority

==== Week 5 (September 1 & 2) ====
- Theme: OPM songs
- Musical guest: Pepe Smith ("Titser's Enemi No.1")
- Group performance: "Mga Kababayan Ko"; mashup songs of "Salidumay", and "Urong Sulong"; "Rock Baby, Rock"; "Balong Malalim" with Pepe Smith

Contestants' performances on the fifth live show
Act	Order	Song	Result
Jeric Medina	1	"Akin Ka Na Lang"	Safe
Joan Da	2	"Nobela"	Bottom two
Daddy's Home	3	"Paraiso"	Safe
Gabriel Maturan	4	"Rainbow"	Safe
Takeoff	5	"Yakap sa Dilim"	Bottom two
Allen Sta. Maria	6	"Hanggang May Kailanman"	Safe
KZ Tandingan	7	"Ang Huling El Bimbo"	Safe
Kedebon Colim	8	"Kailangan Kita"	Safe
Final showdown details
Joan Da	1	"Grenade"	Safe
Takeoff	2	"Sa Kanya"	Eliminated

Judges' vote to eliminate

- Valenciano: Joan Da – Backed his own act, Takeoff
- Corrales: Takeoff – backed her own act, Joan Da
- Nievera: Joan Da – gave no reason
- Charice: Takeoff – backed the act with the least bottom two history, Joan Da

With the judges deadlocked, Takeoff was eliminated as the act with the fewest public vote.

==== Week 6 (September 8 & 9) ====
- Theme: Songs from the 1980s
- Celebrity performers: Dingdong Avanzado, Gino Padilla, Randy Santiago
- Group performance: "Wake Me Up Before You Go-Go" with Dingdong Avanzado; "Boys Don't Cry" with Gino Padilla; "Gold" with Randy Santiago; "I'm So Excited" with Dingdong Avanzado, Gino Padilla, and Randy Santiago

Contestants' performances on the sixth live show
Act	Order	Song	Result
Allen Sta. Maria	1	"Every Breath You Take"	Bottom two
Gabriel Maturan	2	"Forever"	Safe
KZ Tandingan	3	"Eternal Flame"	Safe
Jeric Medina	4	"Careless Whisper"	Safe
Daddy's Home	5	"Will You Still Love Me?"	Safe
Kedebon Colim	6	"Eye of the Tiger"	Safe
Joan Da	7	"Billie Jean"	Bottom two
Final showdown details
Joan Da	1	"All About Him"	Eliminated
Allen Sta. Maria	2	"I Am Me"	Safe

Judges' vote to eliminate

- Charice: Joan Da – backed her own act, Allen Sta. Maria
- Corrales: Allen Sta. Maria – backed her own act, Joan Da
- Valenciano: Joan Da – gave no reason
- Nievera: Joan Da – Based on the final showdown performance

==== Week 7 (September 15 & 16) ====
- Theme: Songs by Eraserheads and Rivermaya
- Musical guest: Kean Cipriano, Ney Dimaculangan, Tutti Caringal
- Special guest performers: special dance number from L.A. Dancers
- Group performance: "Alapaap" with Tutti Caringal; "Elisi" with Ney Dimaculangan; "Magasin" with Kean Cipriano; "Awit Ng Kabataan" with Kean Cipriano, Ney Dimaculangan, and Tutti Caringal

Contestants' performances on the seventh live show
Act	Order	Song	Result
Daddy's Home	1	"Himala"	Bottom two
Gabriel Maturan	2	"Hinahanap-hanap Kita"	Safe
Jeric Medina	3	"214"	Safe
KZ Tandingan	4	"Kisapmata"	Safe
Kedebon Colim	5	"Toyang"	Bottom two
Allen Sta. Maria	6	"With a Smile"	Safe
Final showdown details
Kedebon Colim	1	"Hero"	Eliminated
Daddy's Home	2	"Lately"	Safe

Judges' vote to eliminate

- Corrales: Kedebon Colim – based her vote on who performed least during the final showdown
- Valenciano: Kedebon Colim – backed his own act, Daddy's Home
- Nievera: Kedebon Colim – felt that the other judges will also send him home
- Charice: was not required to vote since there was already a majority

==== Week 8 (September 22 & 23) ====
- Theme: Revival songs
- Celebrity performers: Richard Poon, Duncan Ramos, Aiza Seguerra, Khalil Ramos ("Kung Ako Ba Siya"), Daniel Padilla ("Prinsesa")
- Group performance: "Crazy Little Thing Called Love" with Richard Poon, "Kiss" with Duncan Ramos, "Sweet Child o' Mine" with Aiza Seguerra (on the performance night);

Contestants' performances on the eighth live show
Act	Order	Song	Revived By	Result
Allen Sta. Maria	1	"Teenage Dream"	Darren Criss	Safe
Gabriel Maturan	2	"Moonlight Over Paris"	Paolo Santos	Safe
KZ Tandingan	3	"Make You Feel My Love"	Adele	Safe
Jeric Medina	4	"Do You Believe In Me"	South Border	Bottom two
Daddy's Home	5	"Tell Me"	Side A	Bottom two
Final showdown details
Daddy's Home	1	"Against All Odds (Take a Look at Me Now)"		Safe
Jeric Medina	2	"I Don't Want to Miss a Thing"		Eliminated

Judges' vote to eliminate

- Corrales: Daddy's Home – gave no reason
- Valenciano: Jeric Medina – backed his own act, Daddy's Home
- Nievera: Daddy's Home – backed his own act, Jeric Medina.
- Charice: Jeric Medina – based her vote with the act that has least potential and has a less spot in the industry.

With the judges deadlocked, Jeric Medina was eliminated as the act with the fewest public vote.

==== Week 9 (September 29 & 30) ====
- Theme: Songs from musical heroes
- Celebrity performers: Toni Gonzaga ("Lady Marmalade"); Pilipinas Got Talent's El Gamma Penumbra performed a shadow theatrical routine based from ABS-CBN's I Choose Philippines "Piliin Ang Pilipinas" tourism campaign

Contestants' performances on the ninth live show
Act	Order	Song	Musical hero	Result
Allen Sta. Maria	1	"Whip My Hair"	Willow Smith	Bottom two
Daddy's Home	2	"Open Arms"	Journey	Safe
KZ Tandingan	3	"Forever"	Chris Brown	Bottom two
Gabriel Maturan	4	"Boyfriend"	Justin Bieber	Safe
Final showdown details
Allen Sta. Maria	1	"Perfect"		Eliminated
KZ Tandingan	2	"Ordinary People"		Safe

Judges' vote to eliminate

- Nievera: Allen Sta. Maria – felt that she had less X factor than KZ
- Corrales: Allen Sta. Maria – felt that even if she goes home, she is already a star
- Valenciano: Allen Sta. Maria – felt that KZ has the global reach
- Charice: was not required to vote since there was a majority

==== Week 10: Finals (October 6 & 7) ====
October 6

- Themes: Contestant's choice; Celebrity duets
- Celebrity performers: Lani Misalucha performed "Raise Your Glass"; Vina Morales performed a medley of "Goin' In", I'm Into You" and "On the Floor"
- Group performance: "Dynamite" with Lani Misalucha

October 7

- Theme: Mentor duets
- Celebrity performers: KC Concepcion ("Wet"); Pooh and Kedebon Colim ("Para Sa'Yo Ang Laban Na 'To"); April Boy Regino and Modesto Taran ("Paano ang Puso Ko"); K Brosas and Osang ("No More Tears (Enough Is Enough)"); Yeng Constantino with the Top 5 acts
- Group performance: "Try It on My Own" with Erik Santos; "This Is My Now" with Jed Madela; "Win" with Jovit Baldivino; "The Climb" with Angeline Quinto, Jed Madela, Erik Santos, and Jovit Baldivino; "Bro, Ikaw ang Star ng Pasko"
- Mentors' performance: Charice ("Pyramid"); Gary Valenciano ("Hataw Na"); Martin Nievera ("This Is the Moment"); Pilita Corrales ("If I Never Sing Another Song") together with Charice, Gary Nievera, and Gary Valenciano
- Grand winner's performance: KZ Tandingan ("Superstar")

Contestants' performances on the final live show
Act	October 6					October 7			Result
Act	Order	First song	Order	Second song	Duet with	Order	Third song	Duet with	Result
Daddy's Home	1	"Gaya ng Dati"	4	"Through the Fire"	Nina	2	"Man in the Mirror"	Gary Valenciano	Eliminated
Gabriel Maturan	2	"I Believe"	6	"The Man Who Can't Be Moved"	Bamboo Mañalac	3	"Go the Distance"	Martin Nievera	Runner-up
KZ Tandingan	3	"Superstar"	5	"The Way We Were"	Rico J. Puno	1	"The Way You Look Tonight"	Charice	Winner

== Television ratings ==
Television ratings for the first season of The X Factor Philippines on ABS-CBN are gathered from two major sources, namely from AGB Nielsen and Kantar Media. AGB Nielsen's survey ratings are gathered from Mega Manila households, while Kantar Media's survey ratings are gathered from all over the Philippines' urban and rural households.

Stage	Air Date	Television ratings from AGB Nielsen			Television ratings from Kantar Media			Source
Stage	Air Date	Rating	Ranking		Rating	Ranking		Source
Stage	Air Date	Rating	Timeslot	Primetime	Rating	Timeslot	Primetime	Source
Judge's Auditions	June 23	18.3%	#2	#4	25.1%	#1	#3	
Judge's Auditions	June 24	18.3%	#1	#4	20.3%	#1	#3	
Judge's Auditions	June 30	19.3%	#2	#3	27.3%	#1	#3	
Judge's Auditions	July 1	18.5%	#1	#4	18.9%	#1	#5	
Judge's Auditions	July 7	18.9%	#2	#4	29.6%	#1	#2	
Judge's Auditions	July 8	17.7%	#1	#3	16.7%	#1	#5	
Judge's Auditions	July 14	16.7%	#2	#6	24.4%	#1	#4	
Judge's Auditions	July 15	17.5%	#1	#2	17.4%	#1	#5	
Bootcamp	July 21	16.1%	#2	#7	22.2%	#1	#4	
Bootcamp	July 22	18.3%	#1	#4	17.8%	#1	#6	
Judges' Home Visit	July 28	16.8%	#2	#6	23.1%	#1	#4	
Judges' Home Visit	July 29	16.0%	#1	#6	18.1%	#1	#6	
Live Shows	August 4	15.5%	#2	#7	20.7%	#1	#5	
Live Shows	August 5	16.2%	#1	#5	16.6%	#1	#7	
Live Shows	August 11	14.0%	#2	#5	19.1%	#1	#4	
Live Shows	August 12	15.0%	#2	#5	19.0%	#1	#4	
Live Shows	August 18	15.0%	#2	#6	19.0%	#1	#5	
Live Shows	August 19	15.1%	#1	#7	17.8%	#1	#5	
Live Shows	August 25	16.0%	#2	#6	19.3%	#1	#4	
Live Shows	August 26	15.6%	#1	#6	18.4%	#1	#4	
Live Shows	September 1	16.2%	#2	#7	17.7%	#1	#6	
Live Shows	September 2	16.0%	#1	#6	17.0%	#1	#6	
Live Shows	September 8	14.6%	#2	#7	18.0%	#1	#5	
Live Shows	September 9	16.0%	#1	#8	17.3%	#1	#5	
Live Shows	September 15	15.8%	#2	#9	19.0%	#1	#5	
Live Shows	September 16	16.2%	#1	#7	19.5%	#1	#5	
Live Shows	September 22	16.0%	#2	#8	18.7%	#1	#4	
Live Shows	September 23	16.5%	#1	#6	17.6%	#1	#7	
Live Shows	September 29	17.3%	#2	#8	21.1%	#1	#4	
Live Shows	September 30	16.8%	#1	#5	21.6%	#1	#2	
Live Finals	October 6	17.7%	#2	#5	19.2%	#1	#5	
Live Finals	October 7	23.9%	#1	#1	24.5%	#1	#1	
Special Episodes	October 13	12.3%	#2	#8	16.6%	#1	#5	
Special Episodes	October 14	11.8%	#2	#10	12.9%	#1	#9	
SEASON AVERAGE		16.2%	#2	#6	19.74%	#1	#5	

Color keys
Highest rating during the season
Lowest rating during the season

== Music ==
=== The X Factor Philippines Album ===
The X Factor Philippines

Compilation album by The X Factor All Stars
- Released: October 6, 2012 (Digital via iTunes Philippines); November 7, 2012 (CD)
- Recorded: 2012
- Genres: OPM, pop
- Length: 50:58
- Label: Star Records

The X Factor Philippines album is the first compilation album by The X Factor Philippines Season 1 finalists. It was released digitally in iTunes Philippines by Star Records on October 6, 2012. The album is composed of 13 tracks.

On October 9, 2012, two days after being crowned as the grand winner, KZ Tandingan's own rendition of "Killing Me Softly" became number 1 on the Philippines iTunes chart toppling the K-pop viral single of Psy's "Gangnam Style" to number 2. Daddy's Home rendition of Whitney Houston's "All at Once" also came in number 3 beating the newly released single, "Skyfall" by Adele. "Star ng Pasko" also made it to the charts at number 7.

A CD recorded version of the album was released on November 7, 2012, and was officially launched on November 12, 2012 at Eastwood City in Libis, Quezon City.

==== Track listing ====
No.	Title	Artist	Length
1.	"Got to Be Real" (A Cheryl Lynn original)	A.K.A. Jam	2:32
2.	"Love the Way You Lie" (A Rihanna original)	Allen Sta. Maria	4:10
3.	"All at Once" (A Whitney Houston original)	Daddy's Home	3:58
4.	"It Will Rain" (A Bruno Mars original)	Gabriel Maturan	4:13
5.	"Kung Wala Na" (A Jaya original)	Jerrianne Templo	4:43
6.	"Can't Help Falling in Love" (An Elvis Presley original)	Jeric Medina	3:01
7.	"Ang Pag-ibig Kong Ito" (A Leah Navarro original)	Joan Da	3:27
8.	"Mahal Kita Kasi" (A Toni Gonzaga original)	Kedebon Colim feat. Allen Sta. Maria	4:03
9.	"Killing Me Softly" (A Roberta Flack original)	KZ Tandingan	4:31
10.	"Nanghihinayang" (A Jerimiah original)	Mark Mabasa	4:38
11.	"Balatkayo" (An Anthony Castelo original)	Modesto Taran	3:28
12.	"Stay" (A Carol Banawa original)	Takeoff	3:52
13.	"Star ng Pasko"	X-Factor All Star	4:22
Total length:			50:58

== See also ==
- List of programs broadcast by ABS-CBN Corporation
- The X Factor
