= Something More (Secondhand Serenade song) =

Single by Secondhand Serenade

from the album Hear Me Now
- Released: June 1, 2010
- Genre: Alternative rock
- Length: 3:24; 13:17 (deluxe single)
- Label: Glassnote
- Songwriter: John Vesely
- Producers: John Vesely; Tom Breyfogle

Secondhand Serenade singles chronology
"Your Call" (2008)	"Something More" (2010)	"Shake It Off" (2013)

"Something More" is a song by alternative rock band Secondhand Serenade, released as the first single from their third studio album, Hear Me Now. The track was released onto iTunes on June 1, 2010, as a deluxe single with bonus track "You Are a Drug", a video showing the making of "Something More", and a digital booklet. The song first appeared on Kid Kraddick's nationally syndicated radio show on May 17, 2010.

== Background ==
Driven by a piano melody and mid-tempo percussion, the ballad is focused on Vesely's vocals, as he wails about self-revelation and purpose in life: "There must be something more. Do we know what we're fighting for?... I fooled everyone and now what will I become? I have to start this over... There must be something more. Do we know what we're fighting for?", the hypnotic ballad reflects on learning how to forgive and move on from a shattered relationship.

== Critical reception ==
Something More received mixed reviews from most critics.

Alex Vitoulis of Billboard said, "As Vesely sings of the internal strife that a breakup can cause, he powerfully conveys the very human message that everyone makes mistakes. A no-brainer for top 40 and hot AC radio formats, "Something More" is sure to saturate the summer airwaves."

The Album Project said that the song is "a poignant prodding of life's purpose—hardly a new subject matter, but everyone's entitled to their chance to untangle it—accompanied by genre-blending R&B beats."

Sputnikmusic said: "The first single, is definitely radio ready if nothing else. It seems to borrow influences from both the Fray and OneRepublic, although a great deal of that arises from the production as opposed to an actual stylistic change."

AbsolutePunk said it "carries a sentiment that could easily resonate with middle-schoolers and post-grads. But are they profoundly deep? Therein lies the conundrum with Vesely. Sure his Hallmark lyrics may not exactly be thought-provoking, but his ability to marry heart-on-sleeve intimacy with radio-ready choruses truly knows no bounds. In short, when it comes to Top 40 and AC radio formats, there are few better than this guy."

== Track listing ==
Deluxe single
No.	Title	Length
1.	"Something More"	3:24
2.	"You Are a Drug"	3:46
3.	"Something More" (making of)	6:07
4.	"Something More" (digital booklet)

== Release history ==
Release dates and formats for "Something More"
Region	Date	Format	Label(s)	Ref.
United States	June 15, 2010	Mainstream airplay	Glassnote	
