= Hear Me Now (album) =

Studio album by Secondhand Serenade
- Released: August 3, 2010
- Recorded: 2009–2010
- Genres: Alternative rock; pop rock; emo pop
- Length: 40:39
- Label: Glassnote
- Producers: Aaron Johnson; John Vesely; Tom Breyfogle

Secondhand Serenade chronology
| A Twist in My Story (2008) | Hear Me Now (2010) | Undefeated (2014) |

Singles from Hear Me Now
- 1. "Something More" Released: June 1, 2010

Hear Me Now is the third studio album by Secondhand Serenade, released on August 3, 2010. The album debuted at number 42 on the Billboard 200, two places higher than his 2008 release A Twist in My Story, making it his highest chart debut.

== Background ==
The singer-songwriter calls the album a slight departure from his previous releases, both in content and sound. "This album, for once, talks about how I'm feeling and how I'm kind of coping and moving on, and good things that are going on with me, bad things, things happening with work – it's not just limited to relationships. A lot of it is more like kind of re-examining who I am and if I'm happy with myself". In an interview, John Vesely stated that the new record will be more upbeat than his last album, which focused on relationships.

The progression reflects his life as both a musician and family man. "I grew up really, really quickly," he says. "I had my first child when I was 20 years old. That's all a part of becoming mature. I had to mature quickly, and very early on ... I have these little kids that rely on me to take care of them. And there's no bigger drive you can possibly have than actual people relying on you." -John Vesely

"The label was telling me that we needed more songs for the album, that we weren't quite done, and I was worried my album was never going to come out," he recalls. "I just sat at the piano and started writing the song; it was a lot different than any of the other songs I'd written, and it...became the first single." Vesely says he "really enjoyed" taking the reins for a few songs. "It was something I've always wanted to do and finally had the confidence to go out and do it," he says. "Some of my favorite songs are the ones I produced myself. It was a really great experience for me." -John Vesely

== Track listing ==
All songs written by John Vesely, and eight of the eleven songs on the album were produced by Aaron Johnson (The Fray) at Swing House studios in Los Angeles, the other three, "You & I", "Hear Me Now" and the first single, "Something More", were produced by John Vesely himself along with Secondhand drummer Tom Breyfogle at Vesely's home studio and mixed by Mark Endert (Train, Maroon 5). The second single is said to be You & I ft: Cady Groves and the 3rd single has been hinted as the title track Ft: Juliet Simms

All tracks are written by John Vesely; "Hear Me Now" written with Juliet Simms.

| No. | Title | Producer(s) | Length |
|---|---|---|---|
| 1. | "Distance" | Aaron Johnson | 3:56 |
| 2. | "Something More" | John Vesely; Tom Breyfogle | 3:24 |
| 3. | "Stay Away" | Johnson | 2:47 |
| 4. | "You & I" | Vesely; Breyfogle | 3:37 |
| 5. | "Is There Anybody Out There?" | Johnson | 3:42 |
| 6. | "Reach for the Sky" | Johnson | 3:21 |
| 7. | "Only Hope" | Johnson | 3:44 |
| 8. | "So Long" | Johnson | 2:59 |
| 9. | "World Turns" | Johnson | 3:42 |
| 10. | "Nightmares" | Johnson | 4:03 |
| 11. | "Hear Me Now" (featuring Juliet Simms of Automatic Loveletter) | Vesely; Breyfogle | 5:24 |
| Total length: | | | 40:39 |

iTunes bonus track
| No. | Title | Producer(s) | Length |
|---|---|---|---|
| 12. | "Run for Cover" | Johnson | 3:47 |
| Total length: | | | 44:26 |

Singapore bonus track
| No. | Title | Producer(s) | Length |
|---|---|---|---|
| 12. | "Fall for You" (acoustic version) | Vesely | 3:09 |
| Total length: | | | 43:48 |

== Critical reception ==
Professional ratings
Review scores
| Source | Rating |
|---|---|
| AllMusic | 2/5 stars |
| Idobi | 3.5/5 stars |
| Rolling Stone | 2/5 stars |

The album has received generally unfavorable reviews from critics.

"Sound In The Signals" magazine gave the album a mixed review "Overall, I would say it is a decent pop album. Vesely definitely isn't breaking any new ground and isn't the most original songwriter. The lyrics at times feel weak and in certain spots are a little too repetitive (see “World Turns), but lyrically it has shiny spots. I don't want to be too hard on the album. I always look forward to Secondhand Serenade albums in the same way I always looked forward to An Angle albums. I'm always waiting for the moment when the influences the artists draw from shed away and the artists start to shine as themselves.

Andrew Leahey from AllMusic gave the album 2 stars: "Hear Me Now still clings to Dashbooard Confessional's downtrodden template, with all 11 tracks subscribing to the notion that a song isn’t worth singing unless it involves heartbreak and defeatist lyrics." "Hear Me Now isn't offensive; it's just predictable and anonymous, since none of these songs offer up anything that Secondhand Serenade’s Warped Tour comrades haven't already done with their own albums."

also gave the album 2 stars: "“Hear Me Now” is characterized by mediocre emo-pop ballads and a heaping of the most stereotypical, tear-your-heart-out-in-the-middle-school-bathroom sound imaginable, but there are surprising moments that manage to transcend the tackiness."

J. Edward Keyes from Rolling Stone followed the trend in giving the album a 2 star rating: "The tone of penitence and isolation continue throughout the entirety of "Hear Me Now", with Vesely contemplating loneliness both romantic ("Only Hope") and existential ("Is There Anybody Out There?").

Sputnik Music gave the album 2 stars (out of 10), "There are too many dull and forgettable moments, too many attempts at emotional grandeur, and too few sincere attempts at “shaking things up.” Unfortunately for Secondhand Serenade, their sound is not good enough to repeat to this extent and outside of a select few moments, very little on Hear Me Now qualifies as new."

Gregory Robson from Absolute Punk gave the album a 71/100 rating, "While it's not exactly an album of the year candidate, there's enough radio fodder and at least a few hints at the possibility of another platinum-selling single. While Veseley has gone on record as admitting that Hear Me Now would focus less on relationships and more on upbeat numbers, neither of those two things are true."

== Album credits ==
Performance credits

- John Vesely – vocals, production, bass guitar, guitar, drums, piano, keyboards
- Aaron Johnson – guitar, production
- Tom Breyfogle – drums, production
- Zac Rae – keyboards
- Juliet Simms – vocals
- Dan Rothchild – bass guitar
- Lukas Vesely – bass guitar
- David Levitta – guitar
- Dave Wilder – bass guitar

Technical credits

- John Vesely – drum programming, string arrangement
- Warren Huart – engineering
- Robin Holden – engineering
- Tom Breyfogle – engineering, drum programming
- Jay Clifford – string arrangement
- Tim Palmer – mixing
- Mark Endert – mixing
- Aaron Johnson – mixing
- Stephen Marcussen – mastering
- Davie Dunkeith – engineering assistance
- Joey Florence – engineering assistance
- Steve Shebby – engineering assistance
- Wicz – drum programming
- Ryan Cook – engineering assistance

Additional credits

- Nathan Johnson, Marke Johnson – physical album art direction, layout, design
- Liran Okanon – digital album booklet design

== Charts ==
Chart performance for Hear Me Now
| Chart (2010) | Peak position |
|---|---|
| Australian Hitseekers Albums (ARIA) | 16 |
| US Billboard 200 | 42 |
| US Independent Albums (Billboard) | 7 |
| US Top Alternative Albums (Billboard) | 9 |
| US Top Rock Albums (Billboard) | 14 |

== Release history ==
Release history for Hear Me Now
| Country | Date | UPC |
|---|---|---|
| United States | August 3, 2010 | 075597978827 |
