= A Twist in My Story =

Studio album by Secondhand Serenade
- Released: February 19, 2008
- Recorded: 2007
- Studios: Castle Renholder, Malibuddha Studios
- Genres: Emo; alternative rock; acoustic rock; emo pop
- Length: 44:20
- Labels: Glassnote (US); Avex (JP)
- Producers: Danny Lohner; John Vesely; only track 2: Butch Walker

Secondhand Serenade chronology
Awake (2007)	A Twist in My Story (2008)	Hear Me Now (2010)

Singles from A Twist in My Story
- 1. "Fall for You" Released: January 21, 2008; 2. "Last Time" Released: May 13, 2008; 3. "Your Call" Released: December 5, 2008

Professional ratings
Review scores
Source	Rating
AbsolutePunk	75%
AllMusic	2.5/5 stars
Rolling Stone	2/5 stars

A Twist in My Story is the second studio album by Secondhand Serenade. It was released on February 19, 2008 on Glassnote. The album features the songs "Maybe" and "Your Call", which are new versions of the songs from Awake produced with a band. The first single, "Fall for You" was released on January 21, 2008. The video premiered on TRL one week later.

The album debuted at number 44 on the U.S. Billboard 200 chart, selling about 16,000 copies in its first week.

The albums released in Australia contained a spelling error in the track listing, with "A Twist in My Story" misspelled as "A Twist in My Sotry".

The first single from the album "Fall for You", was certified 2× Platinum by the Recording Industry Association of America (RIAA). This was released in Japan on Avex Group on October 21, 2009.

== Music and lyrics ==
AllMusic categorized the album as emo pop and "unapologetic mainstream" alternative pop. Lyrical themes explored on the album include heartbreak and love. Kerrang! described the album's tracks as "lamentations", and said the album "had emos worldwide sobbing into their pillows".

== Track listing ==
All tracks are written by John Vesely, except where noted.

No.	Title	Length
1.	"Like a Knife"	4:26
2.	"Fall for You"	3:04
3.	"Maybe"	3:31
4.	"Stranger"	4:46
5.	"Your Call"	3:54
6.	"Suppose"	3:47
7.	"A Twist in My Story"	4:08
8.	"Why?"	4:13
9.	"Stay Close, Don't Go"	3:34
10.	"Pretend"	3:30
11.	"Goodbye"	5:27
Total length:		44:20

iTunes bonus tracks
No.	Title	Length
12.	"Tested and True"	3:23
13.	"The Making of A Twist in My Story" (video)	4:56
14.	"Last Time" (available if pre-ordered on iTunes)	4:45
Total length:		57:24

Deluxe edition bonus CD
No.	Title	Writer(s)	Length
12.	"Your Call" (radio version)		3:54
13.	"Fall for You" (acoustic version)		3:09
14.	"Like a Knife" (acoustic version)		4:26
15.	"Last Time"		4:45
16.	"Fix You" (Coldplay cover) (featuring Juliet Simms of Automatic Loveletter)	Chris Martin; Guy Berryman; Jonny Buckland; Will Champion	5:00
Total length:			65:34

Deluxe edition bonus DVD
No.	Title	Length
12.	"Secondhand Serenade: A Firsthand Look"
13.	"Vulnerable" (music video)
14.	"Fall for You" (music video)
15.	"The Making of the "Fall for You" video"
16.	"Your Call" (music video)
17.	""The Making of the "Your Call" video"

Japanese edition
No.	Title	Writer(s)	Length
12.	"Fall for You" (acoustic version)		3:09
13.	"Like a Knife" (acoustic version)		4:26
14.	"Last Time"		4:45
15.	"Fix You" (Coldplay cover) (featuring Juliet Simms of Automatic Loveletter)	Martin; Berryman; Buckland; Champion	5:00
16.	"Only Hope" (demo)		3:33
Total length:			65:13

== Personnel ==
- Jon Vesely – vocals, electric and acoustic guitars, keyboards, piano, bass guitar
- Butch Walker – guitars, bass guitar, keyboards, percussion
- Danny Lohner – guitars, keyboards, programming
- Geno Lenardo – additional guitars
- Branden Steineckert, Darren Dodd, Matt Compton, Ken Mirrone – drums

== Charts ==
=== Weekly charts ===
Weekly chart performance for A Twist in My Story
Chart (2008–2009)	Peak position
Australian Hitseekers Albums (ARIA)	5
US Billboard 200	44
US Top Alternative Albums (Billboard)	9
US Independent Albums (Billboard)	6
US Top Rock Albums (Billboard)	11

=== Year-end charts ===
Year-end chart performance for A Twist in My Story
Chart (2008)	Position
US Independent Albums (Billboard)	20
