= KZ Tandingan (album) =

Studio album by KZ Tandingan
- Released: May 3, 2013
- Recorded: 2012–2013
- Genre: Pop
- Length: 1:17:57
- Label: Star Music

Singles from KZ Tandingan
- 1. "Puro Laro"

KZ Tandingan is the self-titled debut album by Filipino singer KZ Tandingan, released in the summer of 2013. The album features original songs as well as covers.

== Track listing ==
No.	Title	Writer(s)	Length
1.	"Love, Love, Love"	KZ Tandingan	4:44
2.	"Umiibig"	Toto Sorioso	4:36
3.	"Darating Din"	Jonathan Manalo	3:41
4.	"Puro Laro"	Francis Salazar	3:51
5.	"Bakit Lumuluha"	Jonathan Manalo, Paula Alcasid	4:02
6.	"'Wag Ka Nang Umiyak (original by Sugarfree)"	Ebe Dancel	4:40
7.	"Un-Love You"	Mark Mueller / Andrew Goldmark	5:20
8.	"Scared to Death"	Domingo Rosco Jr.	3:51
9.	"Killing Me Softly (original by Lori Lieberman)"	Charles Fox	4:27
Total length:			1:17:57
