= Star ng Pasko =

2009 Filipino-language Christmas song

"Bro, Ikaw ang Star ng Pasko"

Song by various artists
- Released: November 4, 2009
- Recorded: October 2009
- Genre: Christmas; pop
- Length: 5:20
- Composers: Marcus Davis Jr.; Amber Davis
- Lyricist: Robert G. Labayen

ABS-CBN Christmas Station ID chronology
"May Katuparan ang Hiling sa Kapamilyang Kapiling" (2008)	"Bro, Ikaw ang Star ng Pasko" (2009)	"Ngayong Pasko Magniningning ang Pilipino" (2010)

Music video
- "Bro, Ikaw ang Star ng Pasko" on YouTube

"Star ng Pasko" (lit. 'Star of Christmas') is a Filipino-language Christmas song produced by ABS-CBN Creative Communications Management (CCM) for the network's 2009–2010 Christmas station identification titled "Bro, Ikaw ang Star ng Pasko" (lit. 'Bro, You Are the Star of Christmas'). The song was released on November 4, 2009.

== Concept ==
Written by lyricist Robert G. Labayen and composers Marcus and Amber Davis, it serves as a Christmas message of hope, unity, and thankfulness to God for Filipinos in the wake of the disasters caused by Typhoons Ondoy (Ketsana) and Pepeng (Parma). The use of the nickname "Bro" to refer to God comes from the dialogue of the lead character Santino, portrayed by Zaijian Jaranilla in the hit television series May Bukas Pa, which was the most popular program in the Philippines in 2009.

The original concept for the station ID was “Dumadaloy Ang Liwanag” (The Light is Flowing), according to production manager Danie Sedilla, but was revised after Ondoy and Pepeng's onslaught. Robert Labayen rewrote the song to be more inspirational in light of the aforementioned tragedies, recalling how he was "crying while writing [Star ng Pasko] on the roof deck". Star ng Pasko was also the first ABS-CBN Christmas station ID to use a Contemporary R&B beat.

"Star ng Pasko" was unveiled as part of the station ID on November 4, 2009, and became an immediate success among Filipinos. Approximately 200 personalities who are under ABS-CBN were involved in the production of "Bro, Ikaw ang Star ng Pasko," including KC Concepcion, Piolo Pascual, Billy Crawford, Aiza Seguerra, Nina, Jed Madela, Mark Bautista, Rachelle Ann Go and Sarah Geronimo among others. Shooting for the station ID lasted for seven days, and some scenes, including the opening, were shot in Brgy. Banaba, San Mateo, which was one of the areas affected by Typhoon Ondoy.

This station ID also marked Dolphy's last ABS-CBN station ID appearance, and the first time John Lloyd Cruz and Angel Locsin appeared together in one frame (during the bridge part).

== Legacy ==
In the years since the song's release, it is often considered the most popular Christmas station ID song of ABS-CBN. In 2010, the station ID won a Silver Award for Best Media Initiated Campaign at the 4th Tambuli Awards. Labayen himself considers the song to be his career's best work. It was also nominated for Best Christmas Recording at the 2010 Awit Awards.

Due to the success of Star ng Pasko, the musical tune originally used in the 2002 Isang Pamilya, Isang Puso, Ngayong Pasko (with the same tune used in Star ng Pasko itself) and its lyrics continued to be used in ABS-CBN's succeeding Christmas Station IDs. These include the 2010–2011 Ngayong Pasko Magniningning Ang Pilipino (lit. 'The Filipinos will Shine this Christmas'), which features Filipino nationalism and patriotism with montages highlighting Pinoy pride, the University of Santo Tomas (UST) to coincide its three-year quadricentennial celebration from December 18, 2009, to January 27, 2012, and the Philippine flag's sun as the star making it an octagram or eight-sided star that was also used on an earlier version of 2011–2012's Da Best ang Pasko ng Pilipino (lit. 'The Filipino Christmas is the Best') from September 29 to October 16, 2011; the 2017–2018 Just Love Ngayong Christmas (lit. 'Just Love This Christmas'), representing ABS-CBN's colors in the musical tune after the first bridge; the 2019–2020 Family is Forever, incorporating lyrics from previous IDs to commemorate ABS-CBN's year-long 65th anniversary celebration and 10th anniversary of Star ng Pasko's release; and the 2020–2021 Ikaw ang Liwanag at Ligaya (lit. 'You Are the Light and Joy'), which also conveys a message of faith in God. These IDs and theme were produced and aired from October 8, 2010, to January 2, 2011, and November 2, 2017, to January 1, 2021, marking 1–2, 7–12 years after Star ng Pasko's release. The ABS-CBN jingle for Ikaw ang Liwanag at Ligaya is used at the start of YouTube videos uploaded by the network's entertainment division since 2020.

The main distinction between Star ng Pasko itself and its four succeeding station IDs (2010–2011, 2017–2021) is that the 2009–2010 includes both the ABS-CBN and its slogan "The Philippines’ Largest Network” jingle, while the said succeeding IDs only use the network's jingle at the end.

=== Cover version ===
In 2020, an acoustic rendition of the song was performed by Vivoree Esclito and Patrick Quiroz.

=== Commercial use ===
The song was used in one episode of the 2021 iQiyi original series Saying Goodbye.
