= KZ Tandingan =

Filipino singer and rapper (born 1992)

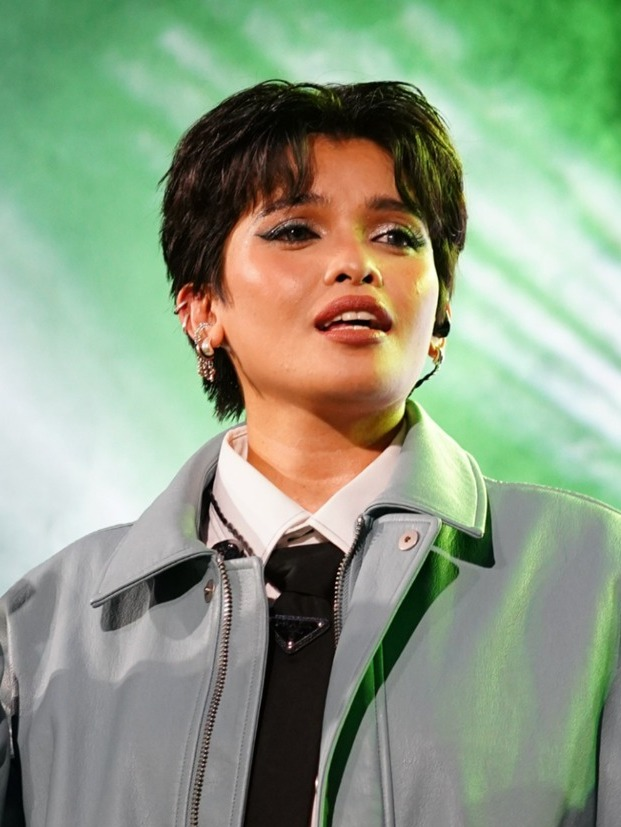
- Tandingan in 2025

Background information
- Born: Kristine Zhenie Lobrigas Tandingan; March 11, 1992 (age 34); Digos, Davao del Sur, Philippines
- Genres: Acoustic jazz; pop; R&B
- Occupations: Singer; rapper
- Years active: 2012–present
- Labels: Star Music; Tarsier Records
- Spouse: TJ Monterde (m. 2020)

Kristine Zhenie "KZ" Lobrigas Tandingan-Monterde (born March 11, 1992) is a Filipino singer and rapper. She rose to prominence following her win on the first season of The X Factor Philippines in 2012.

Hailed as "Asia's Soul Supreme" by various media outlets, Tandingan is recognized as one of her generation's most celebrated Filipino artists. She has been honored with various accolades and recognitions including 7 Awit Awards, 3 Wish 107.5 Music Awards and 2 Myx Music Awards. She achieved international acclaim after participating in the most popular reality TV singing competition in China, Singer 2018. The following year, she made history as the first Filipino artist to stage a sold-out solo concert in Dubai World Trade Center Arena. In 2021, she recorded the first full Filipino Disney song Gabay for the film "Raya and the Last Dragon". Tandingan is also among the most successful artists on Billboard's Philippine Top 20 chart, scoring multiple hits and has reached Platinum status for her sophomore album, "Soul Supremacy". As of 2022, her catalog has reached over 278 million all-time streams on Spotify, becoming one of the most streamed female artists in the country.

In 2023, Tandingan served as one of the coaches for the fifth season of The Voice Kids, and reprised her role in the third season of The Voice Teens.

== Life and career ==
=== Early life ===
KZ Tandingan started singing as a child but had to stop when she was in her junior year in high school after suffering from a throat problem. She is an alumna of University of Southeastern Philippines in Davao City and had graduated with a degree of Bachelor of Science in biology.

Before she joined The X Factor Philippines, Tandingan was part of a local acoustic band.

=== 2012: The X Factor Philippines ===
Tandingan was considered an early favorite after she performed a jazzy version of "Somewhere Over the Rainbow" in the fourth week of the Judges' auditions. After receiving a standing ovation from all the judges, she was requested to sing again. Tandingan obliged and sang "Ready or Not" by American hip-hop group, The Fugees. With her second song, she also showed her rapping skills. Tandingan was greatly praised by all of the judges. Nievera even shouted, "A star is born in Digos!". The video of Tandingan's audition went viral online after it was uploaded in YouTube. The video reached nearly 1 million views before it was removed due to copyright issues. During the Bootcamp stage, she sang "Mahirap Magmahal ng Syota ng Iba" by the APO Hiking Society and cried after she made the cut for the Top 20. Tandingan sang "Killing Me Softly with His Song" by Roberta Flack during the Judges' home visit. On week 9, she landed on the bottom 2 for the first time with teammate Allen Sta. Maria, but she survived elimination. Tandingan was Charice's last remaining act after Allen Sta. Maria was eliminated on week 9. She reached the grand finals on October 7, 2012, and was proclaimed the winner of The X Factor Philippines.

Performances and results

The X Factor Philippines season 1 performances and results
| Stage | Theme | Song choice | Original artist | Order | Result |
|---|---|---|---|---|---|
| Audition | Free choice | "Over the Rainbow" | Judy Garland | —N/a | Advanced |
| Audition | Free choice | "Ready or Not" | Fugees | —N/a | Advanced |
| Bootcamp 1 | Specific song | "Without You" | David Guetta | —N/a | Advanced |
| Bootcamp 2 | Free choice | "Mahirap Magmahal Ng Syota Ng Iba" | APO Hiking Society | —N/a | Advanced |
| Judges' houses | Free choice | "Killing Me Softly with His Song" | Roberta Flack | —N/a | Advanced |
| Top 12 | Songs from the movies | "The Show" | Lenka | 6 | Safe |
| Top 11 | song with Life or Buhay in the title | "For Once in My Life" | Stevie Wonder | 9 | Safe |
| Top 10 | Rock | "In the End" | Linkin Park | 10 | Safe |
| Top 9 | Tribute to late music icons | "Rehab" | Amy Winehouse | 8 | Safe |
| Top 8 | OPM songs | "Ang Huling El Bimbo" | Eraserheads | 7 | Safe |
| Top 7 | Songs from the 1980s | "Eternal Flame" | The Bangles | 3 | Safe |
| Top 6 | Eraserheads or Rivermaya | "Kisapmata" | Rivermaya | 4 | Safe |
| Top 5 | Revival songs | "Make You Feel My Love" | Bob Dylan | 3 | Safe |
| Top 4 | Songs from musical heroes | "Forever" | Chris Brown | 3 | Bottom 2 (Note: Tandingan was in the bottom two but was saved by the judges' votes.) |
| Top 4 | Final showdown | "Ordinary People" | John Legend | 2 | Bottom 2 |
| Finale | Contestant's choice | "Superstar" | The Carpenters | 3 | Winner |
| Finale | Celebrity duet | Duet "The Way We Were" with Rico J. Puno | Barbra Streisand | 5 | Winner |
| Finale | Mentor duet | Duet "The Way You Look Tonight" with Charice | Fred Astaire | 1 | Winner |

=== 2012–present: post The X Factor ===
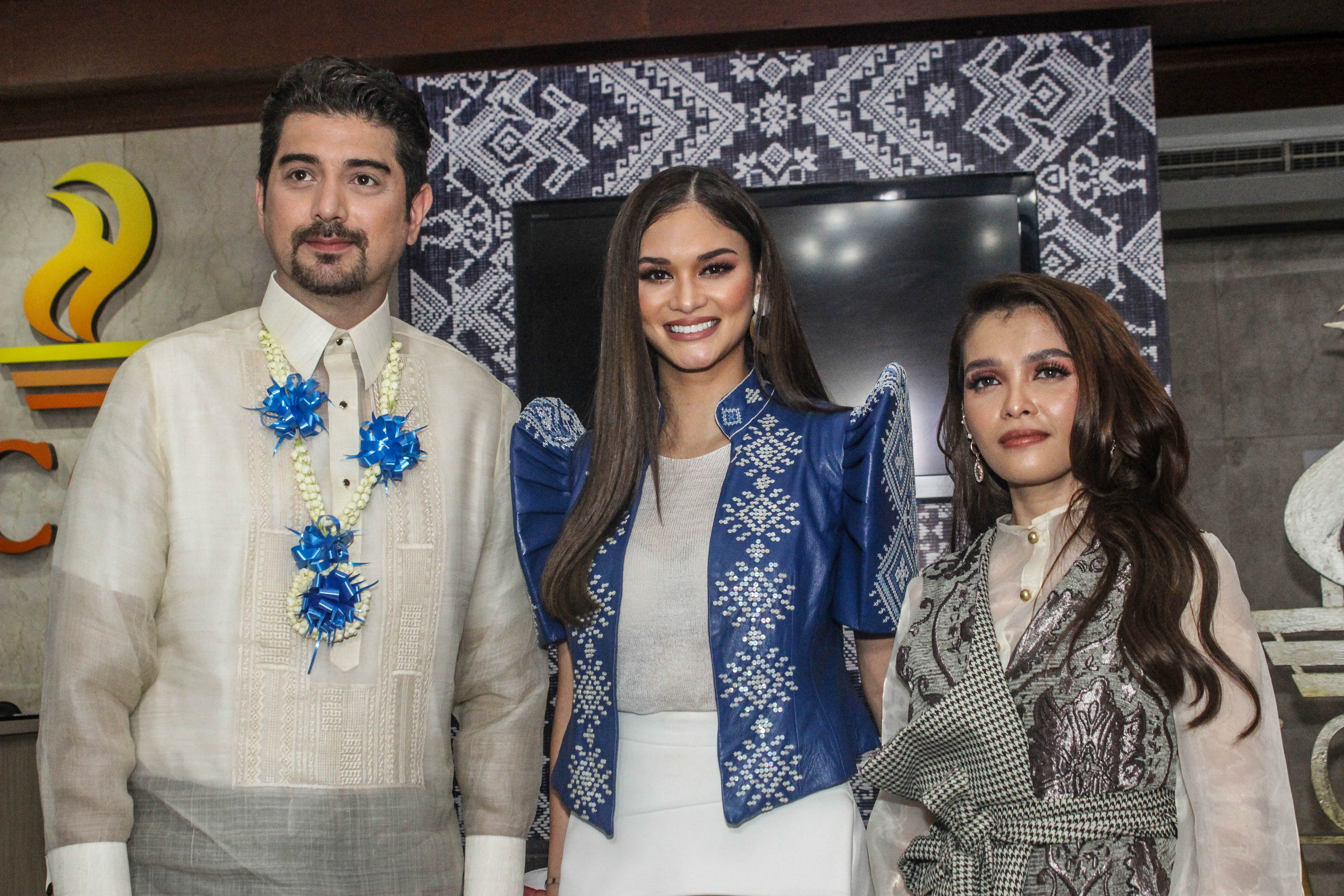
Tandingan (right) with fellow 2019 National Arts Month ambassadors Ian Veneracion and Pia Wurtzbach

On January 7, 2013, Tandingan entered the Himig Handog contest with the song entry called "Scared To Death", written by Domingo Rosco Jr. The song was accompanied with a music video that was assigned as a project to be directed by University of Santo Tomas and premiered on February 2 in Myx Philippines. She performed the song in the grand finals on February 24, 2013, at the SM Mall of Asia Arena. Overall, the song finished in 4th place and was the third runner-up for Best P-pop Love Song thus rewarding the writer of Tandingan's song one hundred thousand pesos in cash. On April 21, 2013, she toured across North America as a supporting act for pop band Side A. On May 2, 2013, Tandingan released her self-titled debut album. The album was produced by Jonathan Manalo and consists of mainly original songs with some covers. On June 27, 2013, she officially launched the album on Makati City.

On January 11, 2014, Tandingan won ₱1,000,000 in The Singing Bee where she accumulated 4 straight songs correctly. In the show, she did not make a single error in the first 2 rounds and eventually won a tie-breaker against co-contestants Frenchie Dy and Sitti, who also did not commit any errors throughout the game. The following year, she was announced as one of the eight contestants for the second season of Your Face Sounds Familiar along with Myrtle Sarrosa, Sam Concepcion, Cacai Bautista, Kean Cipriano, Denise Laurel, Michael Pangilinan and Eric Nicolas. The show ran from September 12, 2015, to December 13, 2015. and she was the 3rd runner-up. Tandingan was then announced as one of the celebrity mentors in We Love OPM in 2016, being the mentor of Team O Diva. The show ran from May 14, 2016, to July 17, 2016. She is currently seen in ASAP, as one of the ASAP Soul Sessions with Jason Dy, Daryl Ong, Jay R and Kyla. The Soul Sessions formed on May 15, 2016, and disbanded in late 2017.

==== Singer 2018 ====
On February 9, 2018, Tandingan competed as a weekly challenger on China's Singer 2018 wherein she placed first on her debut round on week five. She sang her own rendition of Adele's "Rolling in the Deep". She remained as a contestant on the show until her elimination on week nine.

On February 16, 2018, Tandingan sang the Mandopop song in her own rendition, "The Hurts You Never Knew" (Chinese: 你不知道的痛), a combination of three pieces of songs "What Else Do You Want From Me"(Chinese:你還要我怎樣) by Joker Xue, "All The Things You Never Knew" (Chinese:你不知道的事) by Wang Leehom and "Still Aching" (Chinese:還隱隱作痛) by Power Station. She was allowed to remain in the competition for ranking third in the top four, per the competition rules for a challenger.

On March 16, 2018, Tandingan sang "Royals" where she was the third person to perform. That week was a double elimination (after one contestant was too ill to perform and was given bye that week), and per the competition rules the two singers receiving the lowest count of overall votes would be eliminated. She finished last on the overall votes, which resulted in her elimination of Singer 2018 (another contestant, James Li, was also eliminated for finishing 7th on the overall count after a challenger of the week successfully placed in the top four).

Tandingan's stint on the show showcased her artistry in different music genres. Her eventual elimination created a flurry of criticism from social media commentators and Chinese fans she had gained. On Weibo, China's equivalent of Twitter, KZ Tandingan became the second-most talked-about topic after her elimination.

Eliminated singers, except singers who withdrew and singers in the first round, returned for the breakout episode (aired April 6, 2018) for a chance to re-enter Singer 2018 and qualify for the grand finals. Tandingan performed a Tagalog/Mandarin rendition of Anak and finished 7th, and was unable to advance to the finals. Despite her elimination, she later returned as a guest singer (along with former winner Coco Lee) for a performance from Jessie J (who was the series winner) in the grand finals aired April 13, 2018.

==== DIVAS ====
On April 27, 2016, KZ was announced to be part of the DIVAS Live in Manila concert along with Kyla, Yeng Constantino, and Angeline Quinto (Rachelle Ann Go was originally planned to be part of the lineup, but backed out due to international commitments). The singers staged their first team-up concert titled DIVAS Live in Manila on November 11, 2016, at the Smart Araneta Coliseum.

On December 15, 2018, Tandingan, along with Constantino, Kyla and Quinto staged another concert at the Smart Araneta Coliseum with Boyz II Men titled Boyz II Men with DIVAS.

From July–August 2023, Kyla, Yeng and KZ toured in the United States and Canada following the Cornerstone All Star Concert, with Jason Dy as their special guest for the tour, titled Vocal Champs.

==== Concerts and tours ====
===== 2016 =====
On April 27, 2016, it was announced that a girl group named DIVAS, composed of Tandingan, Yeng Constantino, Kyla, Rachelle Ann Go and Angeline Quinto would debut with their first concert at the Smart Araneta Coliseum titled DIVAS: Live in Manila on November 11, 2016. However, Go left the group due to scheduling problems.

===== 2018 =====
KZ held her first major solo concert Supreme: KZ Tandingan at Mall of Asia Arena on June 22, 2018. She shared the stage with some of the biggest artists in Philippines, including fellow ASAP Soul Sessionists Kyla, Jason Dy and Daryl Ong, her biggest rap influence Gloc-9, Malaya hitmaker Moira Dela Torre, singer Iñigo Pascual, and rapper Shanti Dope. Shen then embarked on her first world tour, the "Supreme: World Tour".

On October 31, 2018, KZ returned to the MOA Arena Stage, this time performing alongside Chinese singers Fish Leong, A-Lin, Faye at the PDMN "To Youth Nice To Meet You" Phil-Chi Star Concert.

On December 15, DIVAS returned to the Araneta Coliseum, staging a collaboration concert with the international R&B vocal trio Boyz II Men.

== Personal life ==
Tandingan married musician TJ Monterde on August 28, 2020.

== Discography ==
=== Studio albums ===
| Year | Title | Certifications (sales thresholds) |
|---|---|---|
| 2013 | KZ Tandingan: Released: May 3, 2013; Formats: CD, Digital download | |
| 2017 | Soul Supremacy: Released: 2017; Formats: CD, Digital download | |

=== Singles ===
| Title | Year | Peak chart positions | | Album |
| Title | Year | PHI | PHI 20 | Album |
As lead artist
| "Killing Me Softly" | 2012 | — | — | The X Factor Philippines / KZ Tandingan |
| "Scared to Death" | 2013 | — | — | Himig Handog P-Pop Love Songs 2013 / KZ Tandingan |
| "Puro Laro" | 2013 | — | — | KZ Tandingan |
| "Mahal Ko o Mahal Ako" | 2014 | — | 3 | Himig Handog P-Pop Love Songs 2014 |
| "Laban Pa" (with Jay R) | 2016 | — | — | Himig Handog P-Pop Love Songs 2016 |
| "Two Less Lonely People in the World" | 2017 | 2 | 1 | Kita Kita soundtrack |
| "Labo" | 2017 | — | — | Soul Supremacy |
| "Imposible" (with Shanti Dope) | 2019 | — | — | Soul Supremacy |
| "Raise Your Flag" (with Kritiko) | 2019 | — | — | Non-album single |
| "My Hair, My Say" | 2020 | — | — | Non-album single |
| "Can't Wait to Say I Do" (with TJ Monterde) | 2020 | | | |
| "Gabay" | 2021 | — | — | Gabay (from Raya and the Last Dragon Tagalog Version) |
| ”Huli Na, HULI NA” | 2022 | — | — | Flower of Evil Official Soundtrack |
| ”Pinas Lang Malakas” | 2023 | — | — | MLBB M4 World Championship Official National Cheer Campaign song with collaborations of Nik Makino, MPL Philippines casters, Blacklist International and ECHO Philippines |
As featured artist
| "Bolang Kristal" (with Abra) | 2016 | — | — | Abra |
| "Ikaw at Ako Pa Rin" (with TJ Monterde) | 2017 | 43 | 8 | TJ Monterde (EP) |
| "Industriya" (with Gloc-9) | 2017 | — | — | Sukli |
"—" denotes a recording that did not chart or was released before Billboard Philippines era.

== Filmography ==
=== Television ===
| Year | Title | Network | Role | Notes | Ref(s) |
|---|---|---|---|---|---|
| 2012 | The X Factor Philippines | ABS-CBN | Contestant | Winner | |
| 2012–present | ASAP | ABS-CBN | Herself | Performer | |
| 2013–2021 | Himig Handog | ABS-CBN | Contestant | "Scared To Death" (4th place) "Mahal Ko O Mahal Ako" (Winner) "Laban Pa" (3rd place) "Marupok" (Winner) | |
| 2014 | The Singing Bee | ABS-CBN | Contestant | Winner; won ₱1,000,000 | |
| 2015 | Your Face Sounds Familiar (season 2) | ABS-CBN | Contestant | 4th place | |
| 2016 | We Love OPM | ABS-CBN | Mentor | O Diva; 3rd place | |
| 2017 | FPJ's Ang Probinsyano | ABS-CBN | Herself | Wedding Singer | |
| 2018 | Singer 2018 | Hunan Television | Contestant | Invited first as a challenger | |
| 2022 | Top Class | TV5 | Herself | Vocal Mentor | |
| 2023 | The Voice Kids | Kapamilya Channel; A2Z; TV5 | Herself | Coach | |
| 2024–present | It's Showtime | Kapamilya Channel; A2Z; ALLTV; GMA Network; GTV | Herself | Performer | |

=== Films ===
| Year | Title | Role |
|---|---|---|
| 2019 | The Art of Ligaw | Carisse |

Notes

1. The table above only includes Tandingan's significant appearances, therefore guest appearances are not included.

== Concerts ==
List of concerts, with dates, venues and number of performances
| Year | Title | Notes |
|---|---|---|
| 2017 | KZ Tandingan: Soul Supremacy | • Tandingan's first digital concert for ABS-CBN’s music portal One Music PH. |
| 2019 | Supreme World Tour | • First Filipino act to have performed a sold-out show at the Dubai World Trade Centre Arena (8,500 to 10,000 capacity). • Tandingan's biggest concert since winning X Factor Philippines. |
| 2023 | Live in Concert (North America Concert Tour) with Bamboo | |

=== Special appearances ===
| Year | Title | Notes |
|---|---|---|
| 2017 | Manila X Festival 2017 | • Co-headlined with William Singe, Bamboo, Kiana Valenciano, Curtismith, Sam Concepcion, Jessica Connelly, Franco, Saydie, The Juans, Tukar Sinati, and dance group A Team. |
| 2022 | 1MX London 2022 | • Co-headlined with Bamboo, EZ Mil, Darren Espanto, SAB, Jeremy G, Angela Ken, Jon Guelas. |

== Awards ==
| Year | Awards | Nominated | Result | Ref. |
|---|---|---|---|---|
| 2012 | 25th Aliw Awards by Aliw Awards Foundation, Inc. | KZ Tandingan as the Best New Artist | Won | |
| 2013 | 26th Awit Awards by the Philippine Association of the Record Industry | "Wag Ka Nang Umiyak" as the Best Performance by a New Female Recording Artist | Nominated | |
| 2014 | 27th Awit Awards by the Philippine Association of the Record Industry | "Bakit Lumuluha" as Best Performance by a Female Recording Artist | Nominated | |
| 2014 | 27th Awit Awards by the Philippine Association of the Record Industry | "Scared to Death" as Best Ballad Recording | Won | |
| 2014 | 27th Awit Awards by the Philippine Association of the Record Industry | "Darating Din" as Best Inspirational/Religious Recording | Nominated | |
| 2014 | 27th Awit Awards by the Philippine Association of the Record Industry | "Darating Din" as Best Jazz Recording | Won | |
| 2014 | Myx Music Awards 2014 by MYX | KZ Tandingan as Favorite Female Artist | Nominated | |
| 2014 | Myx Music Awards 2014 by MYX | KZ Tandingan as Favorite New Artist | Won | |
| 2015 | 28th Awit Awards by the Philippine Association of the Record Industry | "May Bukas Pa" (with Yeng Constantino) as Best Collaboration | Won | |
| 2015 | 28th Awit Awards by the Philippine Association of the Record Industry | "Mahal Ko O Mahal Ako" as Best Ballad Recording | Won | |
| 2016 | 29th Awit Awards by the Philippine Association of the Record Industry | "Wag Ka Nang Umiyak" (with Ebe Dancel) as Best Collaboration | Nominated | |
| 2017 | 30th Awit Awards by the Philippine Association of the Record Industry | "Industriya" (with Gloc-9) as Best Collaboration | Nominated | |
| 2017 | 30th Awit Awards by the Philippine Association of the Record Industry | "Industriya" (with Gloc-9) as Best Rap/HipHop Recording | Nominated | |
| 2017 | 2nd Wish 107.5 Music Awards by Wish 107.5 FM | "Throwback" (as featured artist; with Morissette) as Wish Original Song Of the Year by a Female Artist | Won | |
| 2018 | 3rd Wish 107.5 Music Awards by Wish 107.5 FM | KZ Tandingan as Wish Artist of the Year | Nominated | |
| 2018 | 3rd Wish 107.5 Music Awards by Wish 107.5 FM | "Two Less Lonely People in the World" as Wishclusive Pop Performance of the Year | Won | |
| 2018 | 3rd Wish 107.5 Music Awards by Wish 107.5 FM | "Ikaw At Ako Pa Rin" (with TJ Monterde) as Wishclusive Collaboration of the Year | Nominated | |
| 2018 | 3rd Wish 107.5 Music Awards by Wish 107.5 FM | "Labo" by KZ Tandingan as Wish Urban Song of the Year | Won | |
| 2018 | 3rd Wish 107.5 Music Awards by Wish 107.5 FM | "Win The Moment" (as featured artist; with Quest) as Wish Urban Song of the Year | Nominated | |
| 2020 | 33rd Awit Awards by the Philippine Association of the Record Industry | "Halik sa Hangin" as Best Performance by a Female Recording Artist | Won | |
| 2020 | 33rd Awit Awards by the Philippine Association of the Record Industry | "Imposible" (with Shanti Dope) as Best Collaboration | Won | |
| 2020 | 33rd Awit Awards by the Philippine Association of the Record Industry | "Imposible" (with Shanti Dope) as Song of the Year | Won | |
