= The X Factor Philippines =

- Genre: Reality television
- Created by: Simon Cowell
- Based on: The X Factor
- Directed by: Johnny Manahan
- Presented by: KC Concepcion
- Judges: Gary Valenciano; Charice; Martin Nievera; Pilita Corrales
- Voices of: Peter Musñgi
- Country of origin: Philippines
- Original languages: Filipino; English
- No. of seasons: 1
- No. of episodes: 34

Production
- Executive producer: Alou Almaden
- Production locations: Various (Auditions); PAGCOR, Parañaque (Bootcamp, Live shows)
- Running time: 60–120 minutes
- Production companies: ABS-CBN Studios; Fremantle

Original release
- Network: ABS-CBN
- Release: 23 June – 14 October 2012

Related
- The X Factor (British TV series); The X Factor (American TV series); The X Factor franchise

The X Factor Philippines is a Philippine television reality competition show broadcast by ABS-CBN. The show is based on the British reality television series of the same title. Hosted by KC Concepcion, it aired on the network's Yes Weekend evening lineup from June 23 to October 14, 2012, replacing Pinoy Big Brother: Teen Edition 4.

KZ Tandingan was proclaimed the winner of the first season, receiving a cash prize of 4 million pesos and a recording contract from ABS-CBN's recording arm Star Music.

== Overview ==
The series is part of The X Factor franchise and is based on a similar competition format in United Kingdom entitled The X Factor.

== Format ==
=== Categories ===
The show is primarily concerned with identifying singing talent, though appearance, personality, stage presence and dance routines are also an important element of many performances. Each judge is assigned one of four categories. For season one, these categories were: "Boys" (aged 16–25 males), "Girls" (aged 16–25 females), "Over 25s" (solo acts aged 25 and over), and "Groups" (group or duo acts aged 16 and above). Some groups were formed from soloists and other groups rejected after the audition process. Through the live shows, the judges act as mentors to their category, helping to decide song choices, styling and staging, while judging contestants from other categories.

=== Stages ===
There are five stages to The X Factor Philippines. First is the Producers' auditions, the stage where the producers decide who will sing in front of the judges and of the live audience. It is followed by the Judges' auditions, then the Bootcamp, the Judges' home visit, and the Live shows including the finale.

==== Auditions ====
A round of first auditions is held in front of producers months before the show is aired through "open" auditions that anyone (solo artists and vocal groups ages 16 and above) can attend. These auditions, held at various venues around the Philippines, attract very large crowds. The auditions themselves are not televised, but shots of crowds waving and "judges' cars" arriving are filmed and later spliced in with the televised auditions shot later in the year. After waiting at the venue for hours and filming more inserts of screaming and waving, candidates are given a brief audition by someone from the production team. Should they pass that producers' auditions (either for reasons of talent or for the potential of making entertaining television), they are given a "go signal" that allows them to sing in front of the judges and of the live audience. The televised version misrepresents the process by implying that the entire huge crowds all perform to the judges.

A selection of the auditions in front of the judges – usually the best, the worst and the most bizarre – are broadcast over the first few weeks of the show. The judges' auditions are held in front of a live audience and the acts sing over a backing track. A majority of the judges, in this case, at least three judges have to say "yes" then the act goes through to the next stage, otherwise they are sent home.

==== Bootcamp and judges' homes visit ====
The contestants selected at auditions are further refined through a series of performances at "bootcamp", and then at the "judges' houses", until a small number eventually progress to the live finals (twelve in season 1). The houses the contestants visit may not actually belong to the judges, but are sometimes rented for the purpose. During these stages, the producers allocate each of the judges a category to mentor. At bootcamp the judges collaboratively choose either 20 acts (season 1; five from each category) for the next round, and only then are told by the show's producers which category they are to mentor. The contestants did not know who their mentor was until they revealed themselves at the house.

The judges then disband for the "judges' houses" round, where they further reduce their acts on location at a residence with the help of a celebrity guest.

==== Live shows ====
The X Factor Philippines Live shows with presenter' KC Concepcion.

The finals consist of a series of two live shows, the first featuring the contestants' performances and the second revealing the results of the public voting, culminating in one or more acts being eliminated. Celebrity guest performers also feature regularly. These live shows are filmed at PAGCOR Grand Theater in Parañaque, Metro Manila. The performance shows are broadcast on Saturday nights and the results show on Sunday nights. In season one, twelve acts were put through to the live shows.

Performances

The show is primarily concerned with identifying a potential pop star or star group, and singing talent, appearance, personality, stage presence and dance routines are all important elements of the contestants' performances. In the initial live shows, each act performs once in the first show in front of a studio audience and the judges, usually singing over a pre-recorded backing track. Dancers are also commonly featured. Acts are allowed to accompany themselves on guitar or piano. Each live show has had a different theme; each contestant's song is chosen according to the theme. After each act has performed, the judges comment on their performance. Heated disagreements, usually involving judges defending their contestants against criticism, are a regular feature of the show. Once all the acts have appeared, the phone lines open and the viewing public vote on which act they want to keep. Once the number of contestants has been reduced to three (season 1), these acts go on to appear in the grand final which decides the overall winner by public vote.

Results

Before the results are announced, the results show occasionally begins with a group performance from the remaining contestants. The two acts polling the fewest votes are revealed. Both these acts perform again in a "final showdown", and the judges vote on which of the two to send home. They were able to pick new songs to perform in the "final showdown".

Ties are possible as there are four judges voting on which of the two to send home. In the event of a tie the result goes to a deadlock, and the act who came last in the public vote is sent home. The actual number of votes cast and order for each of the bottom act are revealed, but not on the other non-bottom acts.

=== After The X Factor Philippines ===
The winner of The X Factor Philippines is awarded a recording contract and a cash prize of 4 million pesos. It is said to be the biggest prize in a Philippine singing competition.

== Development ==
Before the program was officially announced, ABS-CBN showed The X Factor logo after the end of some of its programs; a new teaser was later revealed bearing the announcement of the Philippine version of the series.

Auditions started in October 2011. Initial auditions are held in various cities, towns, and provinces in the Philippines. Major auditions were held in key cities from different parts of the country such as Baguio, Dagupan, Batangas, Quezon City, Naga, Iloilo, Bacolod, Cebu, Cagayan de Oro and Davao. More than 20,000 people auditioned for the first season of The X Factor Philippines.

ABS-CBN continued to advertise the show with its short commercials which displayed the text "the country's biggest and grandest music event of the year" as the first winner will be awarded with a 4 million peso recording contract.

== Season summary ==
To date, one season has been broadcast, as summarized below.

Contestant in (or mentor of) "Boys" category
Contestant in (or mentor of) "Girls" category
Contestant in (or mentor of) "Over 25s" category
Contestant in (or mentor of) "Groups" category

Season	Premiered	Ended	Winner	Runner-up	Winning mentor	Sponsors	Host	Judges
1	23 June 2012	14 October 2012	KZ Tandingan	Gabriel Maturan	Charice	RRJ; Revlon	KC Concepcion	Charice; Gary Valenciano; Martin Nievera; Pilita Corrales

== Judges and host ==
The X Factor Philippines judges and host; from left: Martin Nievera, Pilita Corrales, KC Concepcion, Gary Valenciano and Charice.

On 29 December 2011, KC Concepcion was announced as the host of the show. In March 2012, singers Charice and Martin Nievera were announced as the first two of the four judges. In April 2012, Gary Valenciano was named as the third judge. In May 2012, Pilita Corrales was announced as the last of the judges, completing the judging panel for the show.

=== Judges' categories and their contestants ===
In each series, each judge is allocated a category to mentor and chooses a three acts to progress to the live shows. This table shows, for each series, which category each judge was allocated and which acts he or she put through to the live shows.

Color key

Winning judge/category. Winners are in bold, eliminated contestants in small font.

Season	Charice	Gary Valenciano	Pilita Corrales	Martin Nievera
**1**	**Girls**; **KZ Tandingan**; Allen Sta. Maria; Jerrianne Templo	**Groups**; Daddy's Home; Takeoff; A.K.A. Jam	**Over 25s** Joan Da; Modesto Taran; Mark Mabasa	**Boys**; Gabriel Maturan; Jeric Medina; Kedebon Colim

== Reception ==
=== Television ratings ===
Television ratings for The X Factor Philippines on ABS-CBN are gathered from two major sources, namely from AGB Nielsen and Kantar Media. AGB Nielsen's survey ratings are gathered from Mega Manila households, while Kantar Media's survey ratings are gathered from all over the Philippines' urban and rural households.

Season	Premiered	Ended	Season Premiere	Rank		Season Finale (Performance Night)	Rank		Season Finale (Results Night)	Rank		Media	Source
Season	Premiered	Ended	Season Premiere	Timeslot	Primetime	Season Finale (Performance Night)	Timeslot	Primetime	Season Finale (Results Night)	Timeslot	Primetime	Media	Source
1	23 June 2012	14 October 2012	18.3%	#2	#4	17.7%	#2	#5	23.9%	#1	#1	AGB Nielsen	
1	23 June 2012	14 October 2012	25.1%	#1	#3	19.2%	#1	#5	24.5%	#1	#1	Kantar Media	

=== Awards ===
Year	Award	Organization	Category	Recipient(s)	Result	Ref.
2014	2013 Golden Screen TV Awards	Entertainment Press Society	Outstanding Adapted Reality/Competition Program	The X Factor Philippines	Nominated	
2014	2013 Golden Screen TV Awards	Entertainment Press Society	Outstanding Adapted Reality/Competition Program Host	KC Concepcion	Nominated	
2013	2013 Asian Television Awards	Television Asia Plus	Best Reality Show	The X Factor Philippines	Nominated	
2013	27th Star Award for Television	Philippine Movie Press Club	Best Talent Search Program Host	KC Concepcion	Nominated	
2013	GMMSF Box-Office Entertainment Awards	Guillermo Mendoza Memorial Scholarship Foundation	Most Popular TV Program Talent Search/Reality	The X Factor Philippines	Won	

== Music releases by The X Factor Philippines contestants ==
Contestant	From season	Music released	Source
KZ Tandingan	Winner, from The X Factor Philippines (season 1)	KZ Tandingan (2013)	
