= Fall for You (Secondhand Serenade song) =

Single by Secondhand Serenade

from the album A Twist in My Story
- Released: January 21, 2008
- Recorded: 2007
- Genre: Emo; alternative rock; emo pop
- Length: 3:05
- Label: Glassnote
- Songwriter: John Vesely
- Producer: Butch Walker

Secondhand Serenade singles chronology
"Vulnerable" (2007)	"Fall for You" (2008)	"A Twist in My Story" (2008)

"Fall for You" is a song by Secondhand Serenade, the solo project of John Vesely. It was the first single from Secondhand Serenade's second studio album A Twist in My Story (2008). The single was released as a digital download in 2008, and after receiving a lot of airplay in the summer months of that year, it peaked at No. 6 on the Billboard Pop Songs chart and No. 21 on the Billboard Hot 100 chart.

The song debuted at number 27 on the Australian singles chart and has since peaked at number 19. The song was certified 2× platinum in the United States by the RIAA. This song is written in the key of C major.

== Music video ==
A music video was released a week after the single was released. The video was shown on MTV's Total Request Live. It features John Vesely playing the piano and performing the song intercut with footage of Vesely with a woman.

== Charts ==
=== Weekly charts ===
Chart (2008–09)	Peak position
Australia (ARIA)	19
Canada Hot 100 (Billboard)	36
Japan Hot 100 (Billboard)	65
US Billboard Hot 100	21
US Adult Pop Airplay (Billboard)	12
US Pop Airplay (Billboard)	6

=== Year-end charts ===
Chart (2008)	Position
Australia (ARIA)	89
US Billboard Hot 100	58
US Mainstream Top 40 (Billboard)	26

== Certifications ==
Region	Certification	Certified units/sales
Australia (ARIA)	Gold	35,000^{^}
United States (RIAA)	2× Platinum	2,000,000^{*}
^{*} Sales figures based on certification alone.^{^} Shipments figures based on certification alone.
