= Ronnie Day =

American musician

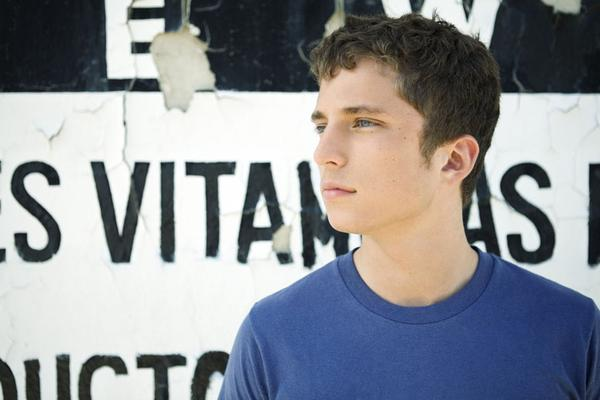

Background information
- Born: Ronald Guglielmone Jr. January 18, 1988 (age 38); Redwood City, California, U.S.
- Genres: Rock
- Occupation: Musician
- Instruments: Vocals, Guitar, Bass, Piano, Drums, Violin, French Horn
- Labels: Simplify Music, Epic Records

Ronnie Day (born Ronald Guglielmone Jr.; January 18, 1988) is an American songwriter from Redwood City, California.

By the age of 16, Day had sold over 10,000 copies of his bedroom record, Nine Sleepless Nights. After being tested for proficiency, he graduated from high school early, and drove coast to coast playing on street corners, in parks, backyards and living rooms. He rose to the top unsigned artist position on both Myspace and Purevolume's music charts, and sales of his album skyrocketed.

In 2006, on his 18th birthday, Day signed with Epic Records, ending an industry-wide bidding war. He has since shared the stage with acts such as The Goo Goo Dolls, Dashboard Confessional, The Plain White T's and Gym Class Heroes. He also played dates on The Warped Tour, The Bamboozle, and MTV's Campus Invasion Tour.

His song "Falling for You" has been heavily featured on various MTV shows, most notably The Real World and The Hills and his song, "My Only Friend" was featured on the Cartoon Network movie "Re-Animated".

mtvU produced The Ronnie Day Project, an episodic video series based on the music from his debut album. The series was directed by Joshua Caldwell, who won an MTV Movie Award for Best Film on Campus.

After being dropped from his label deal, Day set music aside. He spent several years backpacking abroad, and closed all of his websites down. Five years after his debut release, he began recording again and released a new EP, Night Owl, on November 1, 2011. He has called his self-producing label "Simplify Music".

In 2014, he again set music aside and returned to school at Stanford University where he earned a B.S. in electrical engineering.

== Professional album reviews ==
- For The Album:
  - Allmusic link
  - RebelPunk link
  - NeuFutur link
