= Bayside discography =

This is a discography of the punk rock band Bayside. Since forming in 2000 the band has released 9 studio albums, several EPs and one live album.

== Albums ==
=== Studio albums ===
List of studio albums
| Title | Album details | Peak chart positions |
| Title | Album details | U.S. |
|---|---|---|
| Sirens and Condolences | Released: January 27, 2004; Label: Victory; Format: CD, DL, LP | — |
| Bayside | Released: August 23, 2005; Label: Victory; Format: CD, DL, LP | 153 |
| The Walking Wounded | Released: February 6, 2007; Label: Victory; Format: CD, CD+DVD-V, DL, LP | 75 |
| Shudder | Released: September 30, 2008; Label: Victory; Format: CD, DL, LP | 54 |
| Killing Time | Released: February 22, 2011; Label: Wind-up; Format: CD, DL, LP | 35 |
| Cult | Released: February 18, 2014; Label: Hopeless; Format: CD, DL, LP | 24 |
| Vacancy | Released: August 19, 2016; Label: Hopeless; Format: CD, DL, LP | 69 |
| Interrobang | Released: October 4, 2019; Label: Hopeless; Format: CD, DL, LP | 109 |
| There Are Worse Things Than Being Alive | Released: April 8, 2024; Label: Hopeless; Format: CD, DL, LP | — |
"—" denotes releases that did not chart or were not released in that territory.

=== Live albums ===
List of live albums
| Title | Album details |
|---|---|
| Live @ the Bayside Social Club | Released: September 30, 2008; Label: Victory (VR474); Format: CD, DL, LP |

=== Demo albums ===
List of demo albums
| Title | Album details |
|---|---|
| 5 Song Demo | Released: 2000; Label: self-released; Formats: CD-R, DL |
| Bayside Demo | Released: December 2001; Label: self-released; Formats: CD-R, DL |
| New Demo – 2002 | Released: 2002; Label: Dying Wish; Formats: CD-R, DL |

== Extended plays ==
List of extended plays
| Title | Album details | Peak chart positions |
| Title | Album details | U.S. |
|---|---|---|
| Long Stories Short | Released: August 14, 2001; Label: Dying Wish (DWR1-BY1); Format: CD, DL | — |
| Bayside/Name Taken (with Name Taken) | Released: 2003; Label: Dying Wish/Suburban Home (DWR5/SHM 8016); Format: CD, DL | — |
| Acoustic | Released: February 28, 2006; Label: Victory (VR293); Format: CD+DVD-V, DL, 12" vinyl | 200 |
| Bayside/I Am the Avalanche | Released: 2007; Label: Self-released; Format: 7" vinyl | — |
| Bayside/Saves the Day/I Am the Avalanche/Transit | Released: November 2011; Label: Rise Records; Format: 7" vinyl | — |
| Covers Volume #1 | Released: October 23, 2012; Label: Gumshoe (GUM002); Format: CD, DL, 12" vinyl | — |
| Acoustic Volume 2 | Released: September 28, 2018; Label: Hopeless Records; Format: CD, 12" vinyl | — |
| Acoustic Volume Three | Released: December 11, 2020; Label: Hopeless Records; Format: DL, 12" vinyl | — |
| The Red EP | Released: October 19, 2022; Label: Hopeless Records; Format: DL, 12" vinyl | — |
| The Blue EP | Released: March 17, 2023; Label: Hopeless Records; Format: DL, 12" vinyl | — |

== Singles ==
| Year | Title | Album |
|---|---|---|
| 2005 | "Devotion and Desire" | Bayside |
| 2007 | "Duality" | The Walking Wounded |
| 2008 | "Carry On" | The Walking Wounded |
| 2009 | "No One Understands" | Shudder |
| 2010 | "Sick, Sick, Sick" | Killing Time |
| 2011 | "Already Gone" | Killing Time |
| 2011 | "Angels We Have Heard On High (Cover)" | Non-album single |
| 2013 | "Pigsty" | Cult |
| 2014 | "Time Has Come" | Cult |
| 2016 | "Pretty Vacant" | Vacancy |
| 2018 | "It Don't Exist" | Acoustic Volume 2 |
| 2019 | "Prayers" | Interrobang |
| 2022 | "Strangest Faces" | The Red EP |
| 2022 | "Good Advice" | The Red EP |
| 2023 | "How to Ruin Everything (Patience)" (featuring Ice Nine Kills) | The Blue EP |
| 2024 | "Aside" | Aside |
| 2025 | "Devotion and Desire (2025)" | Devotion and Desire (2025) |
| 2026 | "Monsters" | Anywhere but Here |
| 2026 | "Battle Scars" | Proxima centauri b |
| 2026 | "Don't Come Easy" | Bark At The Moon |

== Other appearances ==
- From Brooklyn With Love (Dying Wish Records, 2002) – Song featured: Count The Score & Advance Letter Goodbye
- Punk vs. Emo (2003) – Song featured: Loveless Wrists
- Bad Scene, Everyone's Fault: Jawbreaker Tribute (Dying Wish Records, 2003) – Song featured: Chemistry
- Dead And Dreaming: An Indie Tribute To Counting Crows Tribute (The Vinyl Summer Records, 2004) – Song featured: A Long December
- 'Resident Evil: Extinction' Official Soundtrack (Lakeshore Records, 2007) – Song featured: Duality (Project Alice String Remix)
- Warped Tour 2007 Tour Compilation (Sideonedummy Records, 2007) – Song featured: Duality
- Punk Goes Pop 2 (Fearless Records, 2009) – Song featured: Beautiful Girls (Cover)
- Take Action! Vol. 8 (Hopeless Records, 2009) – Song featured: You've Already Been
- Take Action! Vol. 10 (Hopeless Records, 2011) – Song featured: Battle Scars
- Bayside/Saves The Day/I Am The Avalanche/Transit 7" Split (Rise Records, 2011) – Song featured: Sick, Sick, Sick (Demo)
- Bridge and Tunnel Original Motion Picture Soundtrack - Song Featured: Indiana.
- Green Day: The Early Years (2017) – "Burnout" (Green Day cover)
- In Loving Memory (Columbia Records, 2022) – Artist: Blackbear, Song featured: Poltergeist feat. Bayside

== Music videos ==
- Loveless Wrists (2003)
- Masterpiece (2004)
- Devotion and Desire (2005)
- Duality (2007)
- Carry On (2008)
- No One Understands (2008)
- Sick, Sick, Sick (2010)
- Time Has Come (2014)
- Pigsty (2014)
- Pretty Vacant (2016)
- I've Been Dead All Day (2016)
- Mary (2017)
- It Don't Exist (2018)
- Interrobang (2019)
- Light Me Up (2020)
- Strangest Faces (2022)
