= Sirens and Condolences =

Studio album by Bayside
- Released: January 27, 2004
- Recorded: Phase Studios, College Park, Maryland
- Genre: Emo; pop-punk; post-hardcore
- Length: 39:48
- Label: Victory
- Producer: J. Robbins; Bayside

Bayside chronology
Bayside/Name Taken – Split EP (2003)	Sirens and Condolences (2004)	Bayside (2005)

Sirens and Condolences is the debut studio album by American punk rock band Bayside.

The album was the only one not entirely credited to Bayside as a band. The music and melodies were written by frontman Anthony Raneri, while the lyrics were written by bassist Andrew Elderbaum. The same process was used on their split CD with Name Taken. Elderbaum, along with drummer Jim Mitchell, left the band shortly after the album's release.

== Background ==
Due to exposure from publications as Alternative Press and Skratch, the group signed to independent label Victory Records on May 15, 2003. In July and August 2003, the band toured across the US, with Glasseater, Celebrity, and My Hotel Year. The band recorded their debut album in October 2003.

== Release ==
On November 2, 2003, Sirens and Condolences was announced for release in early 2004, alongside which, its track listing was posted online. Later in November, Bayside went on a west coast tour with Silverstein, followed by an east coast tour in December with the Goodwill, Punchline, Digger, and My Hotel Year. Sirens and Condolences was released on January 27, 2004, through Victory Records. The following month, they toured the US Midwest and East Coast. On February 28, 2004, the band filmed a music video for "Masterpiece" in Chicago, Illinois. The following month, the band played a handful of shows with Gatsbys American Dream. In March and April 2004, the band supported the Juliana Theory on their tour of the US; the trek included an appearance at the Skate and Surf Festival. They supported Autopilot Off on their headlining US tour. In July and August, the group went on tour with Fall Out Boy, Armor for Sleep, Name Taken, and the Academy Is... For this trek, bassist Andrew Elderbaum and drummer Jim Mitchell were replaced by new members. Bayside closed out August 2004 with a week-long tour with Catch 22 and Punchline. They went on an East Coast US tour with Hawthorne Heights, Burning Bright and the Break in September 2004, followed by an appearance at The Fest. Bayside closed out the year touring with Brandtson, the Sleeping, the Black Maria and Action Action.

As of August 2008, the album has sold 59,000 copies.

Professional ratings
Review scores
Source	Rating
AllMusic	3/5 stars
Exclaim!	(unfavorable)
LAS Magazine	6/10
Punknews.org	3/5 stars

== Track listing ==
No.	Title	Length
1.	"Masterpiece"	3:44
2.	"Poison in My Veins"	3:32
3.	"Phone Call from Poland"	3:23
4.	"Talking of Michelangelo"	3:38
5.	"Alcohol and Altar Boys"	3:03
6.	"A Synonym for Acquiesce"	5:17
7.	"How to Fix Everything"	4:04
8.	"Kellum"	2:36
9.	"If You're Bored"	3:04
10.	"Just Enough to Love You" (re-recorded version; original version on Bayside/Name Taken split)	3:45
11.	"Guardrail"	3:38
Total length:		39:48

== Additional ==
- "Talking of Michelangelo" (track 4) is a reference to the poem, "The Love Song of J. Alfred Prufrock" (1915), by T.S. Eliot.

== Personnel ==
- Anthony Raneri - Vocals, Guitar
- Andrew Elderbaum - Bass, Lyrics
- Jack O'Shea - Guitar, Additional vocals
- Jim Mitchell - Drums
- J. Robbins - Production, mixing
- Alan Douches - Mastering
- Emily Driskill - Photography
- Jason Link - Album layout
