= Lion (Punchline album) =

LION

Studio album by Punchline
- Released: March 30, 2018
- Genre: Rock
- Label: InVogue Records
- Producer: Punchline

Punchline chronology
Thrilled (2015)	LION (2018)

LION is the eighth studio album by the rock band Punchline, released as a follow-up to 2015's Thrilled through InVogue Records on March 30, 2018. LION is noted as "a return to form, after the detour into pop nuance taken on 2015's 'Thrilled'".

== Track listing ==
No.	Title	Length
1.	"Friend From The Future"	4:04
2.	"Another Tale Of Remember When"	3:06
3.	"Darkest Dark ft. Matt Thiessen (Relient K) "	3:07
4.	"Dead When It Hits The Shelves"	3:45
5.	"Green Hills 2018"	4:25
6.	"Honey This Is Nothing New"	3:06
7.	"Sensory Overload ft. Anthony Raneri (Bayside)"	3:01
8.	"Can't Tell What's Real"	3:31
9.	"A Friend Indeed"	2:59
10.	"Something Happened In 1988"	2:40
11.	"It's A New Year (Don't Be So Hard On Yourself)"	3:27
12.	"In The Powder Blue"	4:48
Total length:		41:00
