= Charles Rocha =

American musician

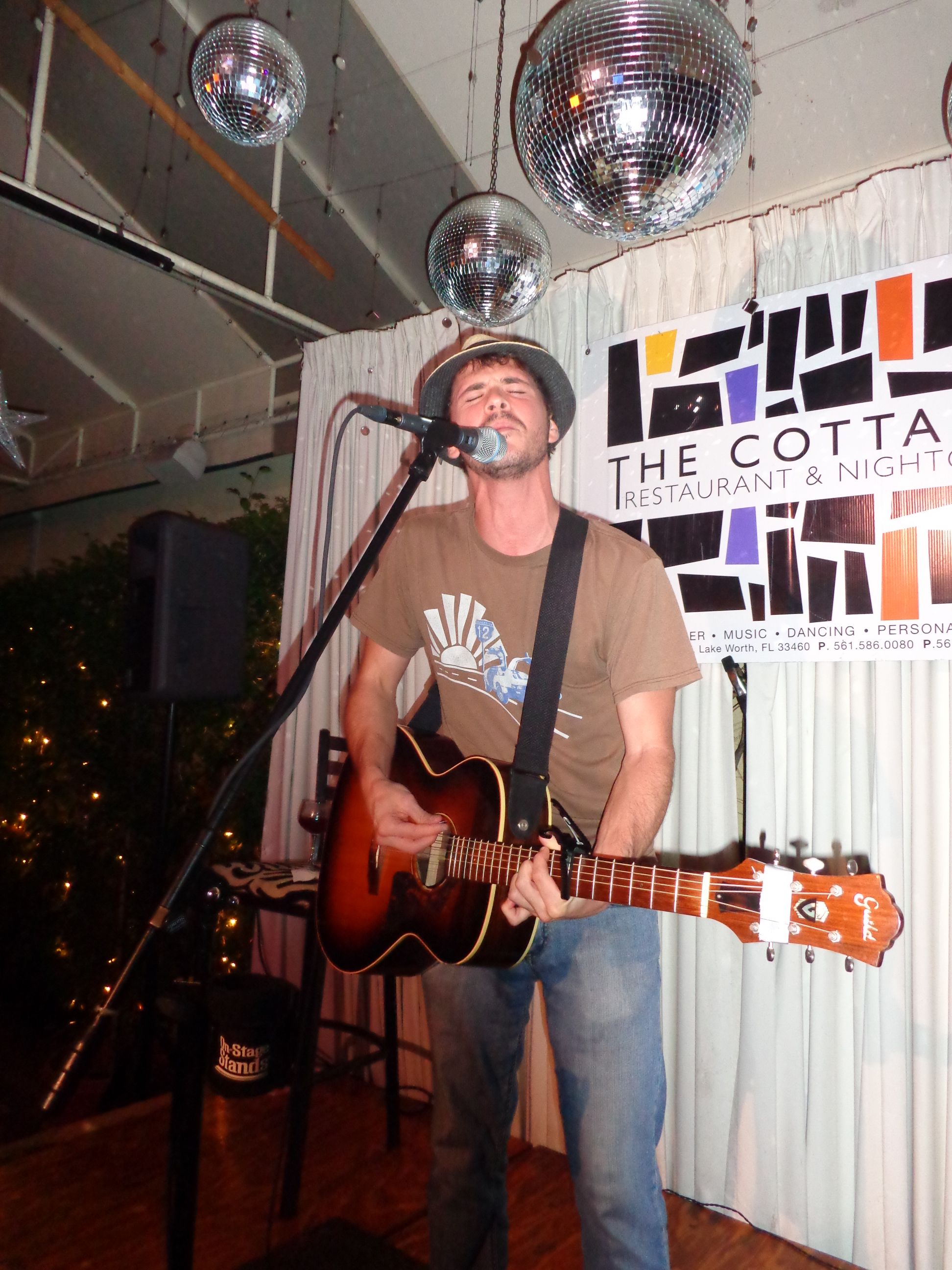

Background information
- Origin: Campinas, Brazil
- Genres: Alternative, pop/rock, folk, punk rock
- Occupations: Record producer, record mixer, musician, songwriter
- Instruments: Guitar, vocals, piano, bass, drums
- Years active: 2002–present
- Labels: Ring Records; Orange Peal Records; Takeover Records
- Website: www.thatsummersong.com www.ringrecords.org

Charles Rocha is an American musician, songwriter and producer living in Los Angeles, California, United States. He was born in Campinas, Brazil, and is of British/Scottish descent. Rocha played lead guitar/backup vocals for the Miami ska/punk/rumba band Askultura. He was also chief engineer/producer for The Kitchen Studio in Oakland Park, Florida. Rocha writes, records and releases his own songs under the moniker That Summer. That Summer produced and released its first full-length album, Acoustic Hippie Punk, totally DIY, in December 2017. He has played in many notable bands throughout his life including Bear Cub, Craig's Brother and The Berlin Project. His first band was formed in Oakmont, Pennsylvania, in his mother's basement. They were called My Life Tragic.

== Musical career ==
When Rocha was 18, he left his high school band and joined The Berlin Project for eight weeks of summer touring. This was his first venture into the music industry. The band toured through the mid west and east coast including numerous dates on the Warped Tour. Some of the bands The Berlin Project shared the stage with that summer were Punchline, NOFX, No Use for a Name, Lagwagon, Bad Religion, N.E.R.D, The Circle Jerks, New Found Glory, Flogging Molly, Good Charlotte, MXPX, Homegrown, The Starting Line and Something Corporate.

The Berlin Project toured through 2004. Rocha got his first taste of a professional recording studio at Mr. Smalls Funhouse in December 2002 when The Berlin Project started pre-production for their final album, The Things We Say. The album was completed in the Spring of 2003 at Mr. Smalls in Pittsburgh, and was produced by Billy Rossi (Anti-Flag, Punchline). Rocha left the band in the midst of a co-headlining tour with The Matches, following an injury to his foot on stage in Milwaukee, Wisconsin.

Later that year, Rocha received a call from friend Benjamin Harper, lead guitarist for Yellowcard, and was asked to join Craig's Brother (Tooth and Nail, Takeover Records) on rhythm guitar/vocals for an upcoming tour supporting Yellowcard, The Starting Line and The Matches. The tour lasted two and half weeks going through the northeast US and Canada. This was Rocha's last involvement in music on a professional level for many years.

In 2009, after a long period of no communication between the two, John Garrighan, founding member of The Berlin Project, invited Rocha to reunite The Berlin Project. The two played a couple of shows in 2009 and 2010 with longtime friends of the band, Paul Menotiades and Cory Muro, opening for The Ataris and The Composure. John Garrighan died of a drug overdose shortly after these reunion shows, and The Hearth EP Vol. 1 by That Summer was dedicated to his memory. Rocha cites John as the man "who opened my eyes to the world of rock n roll".

Rocha began learning to record on his own using a 4 track recorder, and later a laptop computer in California while living in Santa Cruz and Lake Tahoe. His love for recording songs and producing records took hold when he started Bear Cub with songwriter friend Jesse Hall in 2010. Jesse had almost finished recording Bear Cub's first record with his father, Buddy Hall, in his basement studio in Pittsburgh, PA. Rocha joined the two on the last recording of that album, which became the first track on the band's first release, Hey, Let's Get Out Of Here.

In 2010, Bear Cub played sold-out shows in Pittsburgh, quickly selling thousands of copies of their first two albums, S/T and Always Be Down. Eventually, the band decided to move to Nashville. Moving the band proved to be a bad judgement as Bear Cub was only able to flourish for a small amount of time before eventually disbanding. Rocha left Bear Cub in the summer of 2011, during which time the band was writing and recording their third album, Good Morning, Every Morning.

After leaving Nashville, Rocha moved to Florida to work for his grandfather and complete his bachelor's degree in English and Political Science. At this time Rocha used the skills he had learned from Buddy Hall at Beacon Hill Recording Studio in Pittsburgh and began recording his own songs from his bedroom. This evolved into That Summer. Brad Evanovich, also formerly of The Berlin Project, gave Rocha the push and support he needed to help record and release his songs. The two would get together in Florida and finish writing the songs that would become The Hearth EP Vol. 1. The two recorded the music for the album between Brad and Rocha's homes in Florida, and eventually finished the vocals for the album with Roger Lima at The Moathouse Recording Studio in Gainesville, Florida. That Summer played a sold out Record Release Show in Pittsburgh, PA at Club Cafe on March 13, 2013. Rocha promoted the record at SXSW later that month and the two aging punks played That Summer songs on acoustic guitars in bars and gin joints across South Florida through the rest of the year.

At the same time Rocha continued developing his ear in the recording studio working with local artists in South Florida and building the instruments and tools that became The Kitchen Recording Studio in Oakland Park, Florida, where Rocha became Chief Engineer/Producer.

Rocha joined Askultura as lead guitarist/backup vocalist in 2016 and quit the band during their 2017 Supernova Summer Tour. After a serious bout with chemical dependency and a suicide attempt Rocha moved to Los Angeles with the help of Musicares in 2019 and began a record label, Ring Records in 2020.
