= Delightfully Pleased =

Studio album by Punchline
- Released: August 10, 2010
- Genre: Pop punk
- Label: Modern Short Stories, TDR Records

Punchline chronology
Just Say Yes (2008)	Delightfully Pleased (2010)	So Nice to Meet You (2012)

Professional ratings
Review scores
Source	Rating
AbsolutePunk.net	(85%)
Alternative Press	3.5/5 stars
Blare	3/5 stars
Muzik Dizcovery	(85%)

Delightfully Pleased is the sixth studio album by the pop punk band Punchline which was released on August 10, 2010. It is the follow-up to Just Say Yes, released in 2008. The album's title comes from the lyrics of the song "Into The Mouth". The name of the record was thought of during a dream.

The band also released it as a free download. After an incident following a Brokencyde concert in which members of Brokencyde allegedly attacked Punchline's drummer, Cory Muro, and his friend, leaving him requiring three staples in his head and his friend with a broken nose, a website was launched through which visitors could donate money for Delightfully Pleased, any money raised going towards Muro's medical bills incurred as a result of the incident.

The artwork was by their friend Justin Will.

== Track listing ==
No.	Title	Length
1.	"Seventy"	3:01
2.	"The Reinventor"	2:30
3.	"21 Forever"	3:38
4.	"Greatest. Party. Ever."	2:29
5.	"Roller Coaster Smoke"	4:19
6.	"Into The Mouth"	1:28
7.	"Whatever I Want, Whenever I Want"	3:59
8.	"Keystoned"	3:52
9.	"No Significant Other"	2:43
10.	"Coyotes In B Major"	4:13
11.	"A Universal Theme"	4:49
Total length:		36:59
