= Mobbed =

- Mobbed title card
- Genre: Reality television
- Created by: Howie Mandel; Darryl Trell; Howard Kitrosser
- Presented by: Howie Mandel
- Country of origin: United States
- Original language: English
- No. of seasons: 1
- No. of episodes: 11

Production
- Executive producers: Howie Mandel; Chris Cowan; Jean-Michel Michenaud; Mike Marks; Darryl Trell; Howard Kitrosser; Kevin Healey; Michael Rotenberg
- Production location: Los Angeles, California
- Running time: 42 minutes
- Production companies: Alevy Productions Inc. Angel City Factory

Original release
- Network: Fox
- Release: March 31, 2011 – January 10, 2013

Mobbed is an American hidden camera reality television show based on the use of flash mobs as part of the spectacle for the delivery of an important personal message. The show, created by Howie Mandel, Darryl Trell, and Howard Kitrosser, aired on March 31, 2011, as a one-time special on Fox. It premiered as a series in November 2011. The show is hosted by Mandel and choreographed by Tabitha and Napoleon D'umo.

== Premise ==
The premise of the show is to use hidden cameras and flash mobs as part of the delivery of an important personal message. Participants are those who would like to reveal something significant to a friend or loved one. This friend or loved one goes through moments of confusion while people around them break out into synchronized dance in front of their eyes. By the end of an episode, they have learned a secret that could be anything from a marriage proposal, news of a pregnancy, the return of a lost family member, or a moment of reconciliation.

== History ==
Mobbed first aired on Fox on March 31, 2011, as a one-time television special following American Idol. After attracting 10.8 million viewers, Fox decided to order another eight episodes.

The second episode aired November 23, 2011, to less than half of its pilot's audience. Four more episodes aired during 2012, two in January and two in February.

After various public announcements suggesting a return-to-air in July 2012, on November 15, 2012, FOX announced that new episodes would be aired in January 2013.

== Episode guide ==
No.	Title	Original release date	U.S. viewers (millions)
1	"Pilot"	March 31, 2011	10.82
Torrid model Nikki's dreams come true as her boyfriend Justin Davis proposes and they get married in the middle of a flash mob.
2	"A Father's Apology"	November 23, 2011	4.65
A father (Ion) after leaving his wife (Cheryl) and daughter (Meagan) hopes to re-enter his daughter's life and apologize to his wife with the help of a flash mob.
3	"I Love You & We've Never Met"	January 4, 2012	3.06
Steve Soboslai of Pittsburgh-based pop-punk band Punchline gets help to reveal his true feelings to his long-distance best friend of five years whom he's never met.
4	"My Secret Child"	January 11, 2012	3.42
A woman reveals shocking secrets to her family, including news about her marriage and the fact that she has a 6-year-old son who has never met his grandmother.
5	"Brawling Brothers"	February 1, 2012	7.87
Tim Jarzabek of the band "NO" attempts to reconcile a feud with his brother/band mate Nick Jarzabek with help from Everclear's Art Alexakis, the dance crew FORMALity, drummer DJ Ravi, and rapper Ace Hood.
6	"A Father Lost For 37 Years"	February 8, 2012	8.47
A 37-year-old man, Art Siegert, asks the team to help him reunite with his father whom he has never met. Instead of mobbing the father, the team 'flips' the mob and surprises Art by having his father at the center of the mob toward the end of the performance.
7	"You Saved My Life"	January 2, 2013	3.18
A 75 firefighter boss is still devastated after the death of one of his daughters, who died in a car accident. After years of having saved people, his own daughter is the one person who couldn't save. The idea was that he would meet some of the people who received his daughter's donated organs.
8	"Hot for Teacher"	January 2, 2013	2.75
A meek female teacher wants to tell the PE teacher of the same school she works in that she likes him and she wants to go out with him.
9	"We're Having A Baby"	January 3, 2013	2.72
10	"Marry Me Now or It's Over"	January 3, 2013	3.14
11	"You're Fired"	January 10, 2013	3.28
Anthony Henry was a good guy with a big heart and big dreams, but he was struggling just to get by. He worked two part-time jobs and was trying to save money for college, but financial difficulties saw him wind up homeless instead. Some days he was struggling to have enough money to eat.
