= 37 Everywhere =

Studio album by Punchline
- Released: April 11, 2006
- Genre: Pop-punk
- Label: Fueled by Ramen
- Producers: Shep Goodman & Kenny Gioia

Punchline chronology
Action (2004)	37 Everywhere (2006)	Just Say Yes (2008)

Professional ratings
Review scores
Source	Rating
AllMusic	3.5/5 stars
Allrovi	3.5/5 stars
AbsolutePunk	79%

37 Everywhere is the fourth studio album by Punchline. It is the group's second album for Fueled by Ramen Records. It reached a peak of #36 on the Billboard Heatseekers albums chart on April 29, 2006. It was produced by Shep Goodman and Kenny Gioia and continues to bring the brand of energetic pop punk that fans had come to expect from Punchline, yet often takes a turn towards alternative rock or unexpected styles. There is a much heavier use of falsetto on the album, by both Steve Soboslai (guitar) and Greg Wood (guitar), and somewhat less of Punchline's unconventional use of harmony, though the "way they twist their voices mid-word, and adopt a unique sound" remains at large.

== Production ==
Subject matter tends to be less obviously positive than their previous album, following the departure of Paul Menotiades, but self-assured lyrics in songs such as "Green Light", "They Are Strong Hands" and "Exactly" are the antithesis to the dark and often violent lyrics of some of Punchline's peers.

The album contains a number of references to Menotiades, although the band insists that the third track, "The Getaway", is not one of these.

As lead vocalist and lyricist, Soboslai shares vocals with both Wood and Chris Fafalios (bass guitar) on 37 Everywhere. The name of the album comes from Soboslai and Fafalios's growing fascination with the number 37, and the liner notes advise that "The number 37 is everywhere. It is in your daily routine and it will surprise you. Look for it and it will look for you."

The album is dedicated to the life and times of John 'Beatz' Holohan (1974–2005) of the New York band Bayside, and the song "They Are Strong Hands" contains a shout out to the late drummer, "Ain't nobody gonna bring me down, 'cause my boy John Beatz got my back." The title of the song is a reference to the track "They Looked Like Strong Hands" on Bayside's 2005 album Bayside, which features guest vocals from Punchline's Steve Soboslai.

37 Everywhere has guest vocals from Anthony Raneri, the lead vocalist of Bayside on "Flashlight", vocals from John Johansen of the defunct Stryder on "Caller 10", Ryan Mendez of Yellowcard and Staring Back playing guitar on the track "Don't Try This at Home", and Josh Bonner of the defunct Unsung Zeroes on "Wars Will Always Happen".

Punchline headlined the "37 Everywhere Tour" in spring 2006 to promote the album, with label mates Cute Is What We Aim For and the bands Valencia, New Atlantic and The Audition as opening acts.

The band made a video with the director Jonathan London (Houston Calls, Reggie and the Full Effect) for the song "Don't Try This At Home".

=== Art ===
The album art was designed by the artist Jason Sho Green and is commonly noted for its similarities to The Shins' album art for Chutes Too Narrow.

== Reception ==
=== Charts ===
Chart	Peak Position
Heatseekers albums	36

== Track listing ==
No.	Title	Length
1.	"Flashlight" (featuring Anthony Raneri)	3:07
2.	"Don't Try This At Home"	3:40
3.	"The Getaway"	4:01
4.	"Green Light"	3:34
5.	"Caller 10"	3:36
6.	"For The Second Time"	4:13
7.	"The Fake, the Snake and the Birthday Cake"	3:32
8.	"How Could You"	2:15
9.	"Wars Will Always Happen"	2:52
10.	"They Are Strong Hands"	2:57
11.	"Exactly"	4:45
12.	"There He Is!" (Japanese/vinyl bonus track)	3:17
