= The Walking Wounded =

Studio album by Bayside
- Released: February 6, 2007
- Recorded: November 2006
- Genre: Emo; punk rock; hard rock; alternative rock
- Length: 46:12
- Label: Victory
- Producer: Shep Goodman, Kenny Gioia

Bayside chronology
| Acoustic (2006) | The Walking Wounded (2007) | Shudder (2008) |

Singles from The Walking Wounded
- 1. "Duality" Released: January 23, 2007; 2. "Carry On" Released: 2008

The Walking Wounded is the third studio album by American rock band Bayside.

== Background and recording ==
Raneri had spent five months writing The Walking Wounded from August 2006, with the intent of releasing it in early 2007. In September 2006, the band went on a tour of the UK alongside other Victory acts, the Sleeping, Aiden and the Audition. On November 8, 2006, it was announced the band had begun recording. The band worked with producers Shep Goodman and Kenny Gioia, who had previously produced the band's self-titled album.

== Release ==
In December 2006, Bayside went on a brief US East Coast tour, titled the First Annual Holiday Havoc Tour, with the Junior Varsity, Mêlée, and Bombers. On December 22, 2006, The Walking Wounded was announced for release in two months' time; alongside this, the track listing and artwork was posted online. "Duality" has been released as Bayside's first single off The Walking Wounded; it was made available for download on iTunes on January 23, 2007. The album was released on February 6. "Duality" was released to radio on the same day. A music video was released for the song on February 12, 2007; they performed it on Late Night with Conan O'Brien around the same time. In February and March, the band supported Anberlin on their tour of the US. In April 2007, they toured across the UK and then mainland Europe with Moneen and Attack in Black. Following this, they appeared at The Bamboozle festival. In May 2007, The Walking Wounded was released on vinyl; they went on tour with Alesana and the Status. From late June to late August, the band went on the 2007 edition of Warped Tour. From late October to early December, the group headlined the 2007 edition of the Victory Tour.

Raneri embarked on a solo acoustic tour in December 2007 and January 2008. From late January to early March 2008, the band went on a headlining tour of the US with support from Straylight Run, Four Year Strong, Tokyo Rose and the Status. The band supported the Starting Line on their headlining tour of the US in March and April. A music video was released for "Carry On" on March 27, 2008. According to Alternative Press, the video "features the band rocking amongst skyscrapers in a mock city". In April, the band appeared at the Bamboozle Left festival. The band re-issued The Walking Wounded on July 22. Dubbed The Walking Wounded: Gold Edition, the re-issue includes a special edition CD/DVD. The CD/DVD also includes new packaging, an acoustic set filmed at Looney Tunes record store on Long Island, a behind the scenes documentary filmed on tour and music videos.

== Reception ==
Professional ratings
Review scores
| Source | Rating |
|---|---|
| AbsolutePunk | 85% |
| AllMusic | 3.5/5 stars |
| IGN | 8.4/10 |
| Melodic | 2/5 stars |
| Punknews.org | 3.5/5 stars |
| Rolling Stone | 3.5/5 stars |
| Yahoo! Music | Favorable |

The album debuted at number 75 on the U.S. Billboard 200 in mid-February, with about 13,000 copies sold. By August 2008, the album sold 69,000 copies.

== Track listing ==
| No. | Title | Length |
|---|---|---|
| 1. | "The Walking Wounded" | 3:45 |
| 2. | "They're Not Horses, They're Unicorns" | 3:46 |
| 3. | "Duality" | 3:00 |
| 4. | "Carry On" | 4:01 |
| 5. | "I and I" | 3:50 |
| 6. | "Choice Hops and Bottled Self Esteem" | 4:27 |
| 7. | "Head on a Plate" | 4:03 |
| 8. | "Dear Your Holiness" | 3:56 |
| 9. | "Landing Feet First" | 4:04 |
| 10. | "Thankfully" | 3:24 |
| 11. | "A Rite of Passage" | 3:39 |
| 12. | "(Pop)Ular SciencE" | 4:11 |
| Total length: | | 46:12 |

The Walking Wounded: Gold Edition
| No. | Title | Length |
|---|---|---|
| 13. | "I and I" (Live Acoustic) |
| 14. | "Dear Your Holiness" (Live Acoustic) |
| 15. | "Landing Feet First" (Live Acoustic) |

Gold Edition bonus DVD

- The Walking Wounded (Documentary)
- Bayside On Tour (Life On The Road Featurette)
- Tech Talk (Gear Walk Through)
- Duality (Official Music Video)
- Carry On (Official Music Video)

Live Acoustic Set from Looney Tunes In-Store Performance
| No. | Title | Length |
|---|---|---|
| 1. | "Duality" |
| 2. | "Megan" |
| 3. | "Dear Your Holiness" |
| 4. | "Landing Feet First" |
| 5. | "Don't Call Me Peanut" |
| 6. | "I And I" |
| 7. | "Devotion and Desire" |

== Personnel ==
- Anthony Raneri - rhythm guitar, vocals
- Jack O'Shea - lead guitar, backing vocals
- Nick Ghanbarian - bass
- Chris Guglielmo - drums, percussion

Additional personnel

- Vinnie Caruana of I Am the Avalanche - guest vocals on "The Walking Wounded"
- Arthur Bacon - keyboards
