= Shudder (album) =

Studio album by Bayside
- Released: September 30, 2008
- Recorded: June 2008
- Studios: Red Bull, Los Angeles, California
- Genres: Emo; alternative rock; punk rock
- Length: 45:33
- Label: Victory
- Producer: David Schiffman

Bayside chronology
The Walking Wounded (2007)	Shudder (2008)	Killing Time (2011)

Professional ratings
Review scores
Source	Rating
AbsolutePunk	88%
IGN	8.1/10
Punknews.org	4/5 stars
Sputnikmusic	4/5

Shudder is the fourth studio album by American rock band Bayside, released on September 30, 2008. Prior to its release, singer Anthony Raneri described the album as having a more alternative sound than their previous record, The Walking Wounded. The title comes from a lyric in the track "I Can’t Go On".

== Background ==
In June 2008, the band recorded their next album at Red Bull Studios in Los Angeles, California.

== Release ==
In July and August 2008, the band supported Alkaline Trio on their headlining US tour. On July 17, 2008, Shudder was announced for release in October. On August 27, the album's track listing was revealed, followed by the artwork. In addition, it was mentioned that the album would be released slightly earlier, in September. On September 10, "No One Understands" was made available for streaming. On September 19, Shudder was made available for streaming through the group's Myspace profile, before being released on September 30 through independent label Victory Records. "You’ve Already Been" was added as an iTunes bonus track. In October and November, the band went on a headlining tour of the US with support from the Status, Valencia and the Matches. On October 15, a music video was released for "No One Understands". In December, the band co-headlined a tour of the UK with Hit the Lights. They were supported by Oh No Not Stereo. In January 2009, Raneri went on a solo tour alongside frontmen of the Get Up Kids, Saves the Day and Thrice. In February and March 2009, the band toured Australia as part of the Soundwave festival. Between late March and early May, the band supported New Found Glory on their headlining tour of the US. The band appeared at The Bamboozle festival in early May. Between late June and late August, the band performed on the Warped Tour. In October and November 2009, they supported the Bouncing Souls on their headlining US tour.

== Track listing ==
No.	Title	Length
1.	"Boy"	4:01
2.	"The Ghost of Saint Valentine"	3:51
3.	"No One Understands"	3:15
4.	"What and What Not"	3:45
5.	"A Call to Arms"	3:02
6.	"I Can't Go On"	5:16
7.	"Demons"	4:02
8.	"Have Fun Storming the Castle"	3:22
9.	"Howard"	2:55
10.	"Roshambo (Rock, Paper, Scissors)"	3:21
11.	"I Think I'll Be Ok"	3:09
12.	"Moceanu"	2:12
Total length:		45:33

iTunes bonus track
No.	Title	Length
13.	"You've Already Been"	3:32

== Trivia ==
- The intro and solo for the song “Roshambo (Rock, Paper, Scissors)” appears in a promo for Adult Swim’s anime hour.
- “Have Fun Storming the Castle” is a quote from the movie The Princess Bride.
- Shawn Harris, singer of pop punk band The Matches, did the artwork.

== Personnel ==
- Anthony Raneri – Vocals/Guitar
- Jack O’Shea – Guitar
- Nick Ghanbarian – Bass
- Chris Guglielmo – Drums
