= There Are Worse Things Than Being Alive =

Studio album by Bayside
- Released: April 5, 2024
- Genres: Post-hardcore; emo; alternative metal; alternative rock; pop-punk; indie rock
- Length: 37:45
- Label: Hopeless
- Producer: Cameron Webb

Bayside chronology
Interrobang (Bayside album) (2019)	There Are Worse Things Than Being Alive (2024)	Anywhere But Here (2026)

There are Worse Things than Being Alive is the ninth studio album by American rock band Bayside.

== Background ==
Leading up to the album's release, Bayside released two EPs and one single, including The Red EP, The Blue EP, and Castaway. The songs included in these releases were also included in the final release of There are Worse Things than Being Alive. The song How to Ruin Everything (Patience)'' features Ice Nine Kills.

== Release ==
The album was released April 5th, 2024 via Hopeless Records following a continued build-up of EP and single releases.

== Reception ==
The album received generally positive reviews, including a "Staff Pick" selection on PunkNews, an online website that covers news and updates on punk music.

== Track listing ==
No.	Title	Length
1.	"The Devils"	3:43
2.	"Castaway"	3:18
3.	"Go To Hell"	4:00
4.	"How to Ruin Everything (Patience) [feat. Ice Nine Kills]"	3:21
5.	"Good Advice"	3:30
6.	"Miracle"	3:52
7.	"Strangest Faces"	3:11
8.	"Say So Long"	3:01
9.	"Bad Intentions"	3:34
10.	"Just Like Home"	3:13
11.	"I'm So Happy I Could Die"	2:58
Total length:		37:45
