= Bayside (album) =

Studio album by Bayside
- Released: August 23, 2005
- Recorded: March–April 2005
- Studios: Sheppard Music, New York City
- Genres: Punk rock; emo; melodic hardcore; pop-punk; post-hardcore
- Length: 40:52
- Label: Victory
- Producers: Shep Goodman, Kenny Gioia

Bayside chronology
Sirens and Condolences (2004)	Bayside (2005)	Acoustic (2006)

Singles from Bayside
- 1. "Devotion and Desire" Released: July 26, 2005

Bayside is the second album by American punk rock band Bayside.

== Background and production ==
In December 2004, the band posted "Existing in a Crisis (Evelyn)" on their PureVolume profile; that same month, they supported My Chemical Romance for two shows. They played a few East Coast shows, and appeared at the South by Southwest music conference, leading up to the recording of their next album.

Bayside was recorded at Sheppard Music in New York City in March and April 2005, with Shep Goodman and Kenny Gioia acting as producers and engineers. The pair also mixed the album, before it was mastered by Alan Douches at West West Side in Tenafly, New Jersey.

== Release ==
Following the end of recording, Bayside performed at The Bamboozle festival, and toured the East Coast with the Junior Varsity and Just Surrender in May 2005. Following this, they performed at a handful of dates as part of the Zumiez Couch Tour. Between July and September, the band toured with Vendetta Red, A Fall Farewell and Nightmare of You. "Devotion and Desire" was released to radio on July 26, 2005. After initially being scheduled for July 2005, Bayside was released on August 23 through Victory Records. Following this, they went on a cross-country US tour with I Am the Avalanche, June, and the Forecast, running into October 2005. That same month, Bayside toured the UK with labelmates Hawthorne Heights, Silverstein and Spitalfield; it led into a two-month tour of the US with those same acts, plus Aiden, dubbed the Never Sleep Again Tour.

On October 31, 2005, while the band was travelling to Cheyenne, Wyoming, they were involved in a van accident. The vehicle flipped over when it ran over a patch of ice, killing drummer John "Beatz" Holohan, and hospitalizing bassist Nick Ghanbarian in the process. Ghanbarian said in a statement that he had broken his L4 vertebrae, which required surgery. Frontman Anthony Raneri and guitarist Jack O'Shea re-joined the tour from the St. Petersburg, Florida, performing acoustically until its conclusion. In January and February 2006, they band went on the Western Migration tour, which included the Junior Varsity, Punchline and Sullivan. Holohan and Ghanbarian's roles were temporarily filled by Gavin Miller of Staring Back and Nick Testa of A Day in the Life, respectively. Following this, the group supported Smoking Popes on their tour of the US until March 2006. In April, the band supported Protest the Hero on their Canadian tour, dubbed Tour and Loathing. Following this, they appeared at The Bamboozle festival. In May and June, the band went on the Lions Tigers and Bears Tour, with the Sleeping, I Am the Avalanche, Hit the Lights, Halifax, and the Loved Ones. For this trek, Ghanbarian re-joined the band. In between dates on this tour, the band played a number of in-store performances at music stores. In August, the band went on a brief tour alongside Spitalfield, Valencia, and This Is Hell.

== Reception ==
Professional ratings
Review scores
Source	Rating
AllMusic	3.5/5 stars
Exclaim!	Favorable
Melodic	3/5 stars
Punknews.org	2.5/5 stars

By April 2006, the album had sold over 51,000 copies. By August 2008, the album sold 79,000 copies.

== Track listing ==
Track listing per booklet.

No.	Title	Length
1.	"Hello Shitty"	1:14
2.	"Devotion and Desire"	3:29
3.	"Tortures of the Damned"	3:28
4.	"They Looked Like Strong Hands"	3:50
5.	"Montauk"	3:40
6.	"Blame It on Bad Luck"	3:26
7.	"We'll Be OK"	4:23
8.	"Existing in a Crisis (Evelyn)"	4:23
9.	"Don't Call Me Peanut"	3:56
10.	"Half a Life"	4:03
11.	"Dear Tragedy"	4:55
Total length:		40:52

Japanese bonus track
No.	Title	Length
12.	"A Long December" (Counting Crows cover)	4:44

== Personnel ==
Personnel per booklet.

Bayside

- Anthony Raneri – vocals, guitar
- Jack O'Shea – guitar
- Nick Ghanbarian – bass
- John "Beatz" Holohan – drums

Additional musicians

- Arthur Bacon – keyboards (tracks 2 and 9)
- Steve Soboslai – additional vocals (track 4)

Production and design

- Shep Goodman – producer, engineer, mixing
- Kenny Gioia – producer, engineer, mixing
- Alan Douches – mastering
- Chris George – photography
- DoubleJ – layout
