= Cult (Bayside album) =

Studio album by Bayside
- Released: February 18, 2014
- Studio: Carriage House, Stamford, Connecticut; Applehead Recording, Woodstock, New York; Raw Recording, Patterson, New York
- Genre: Emo; alternative rock; pop rock; indie rock
- Length: 38:10
- Label: Hopeless
- Producer: Shep Goodman, Aaron Accetta

Bayside chronology
Killing Time (2011)	Cult (2014)	Vacancy (2016)

Singles from Cult
- 1. "Pigsty" Released: December 3, 2013; 2. "Time Has Come" Released: February 10, 2014

Cult is the sixth studio album by American rock band Bayside.

== Background ==
In September 2012, vocalist/guitarist Anthony Raneri said the group was "locking in a new label" and were aiming to being writing their next album in January 2013. The following month, the group released a covers EP as a stop-gap release to tide their fans over until their next album. Between April and June, the group supported Alkaline Trio on their headlining tour of the US. Cult was recorded at The Carriage House in Stamford, Connecticut, Applehead Recording in Woodstock, New York, and Raw Recording in Patterson, New York, with producers Shep Goodman and Aaron Accetta. Goodman and Dan Korneff served as engineers; Chris Sheldon mixed the album, before it was mastered by John Naclerio at Nada Recording Studios.

== Release ==
On August 16, 2013, the group announced they had signed to independent label Hopeless Records. Raneri said they were keen to with a label that "could be our last label. We wanted to be somewhere that was actually emotionally invested in their bands no matter what the bands potential or situation was." In September and October, the group went on a co-headlining US tour with Motion City Soundtrack. They were supported by What's Eating Gilbert and State Champs. Towards the end of the tour, Raneri was forced to leave due to the birth of his child. His position was filled in by various crew members. On November 12, the group posted several black and photo illustrations on their social media profiles. Later that day, Cult was announced for release in February 2014, revealing its track listing and artwork. In addition, a lyric video was released for "Pigsty". In December, the group performed a few shows with Modern Baseball (band).

On January 27, 2014, a lyric video was released for "Time Has Come". The track was released to radio on February 10. Cult was made available for streaming on February 14, before being released on February 18 through Hopeless Records. On the same day, a music video was released for "Time Has Come". In March and April, the group went on a headlining US tour, dubbed The Great American Cult Tour. They were supported by Four Year Strong, Mixtapes and Daylight. In April, the band supported Alkaline Trio on their headlining UK tour. In October, the group went on a headlining US tour with support from I Am the Avalanche and Seaway. In March and April 2015, the group embarked on an anniversary tour to celebrate 15 years of being a band. They were supported by Senses Fail, Man Overboard and Seaway. In August and September, the group went on tour with The Early November and Better Off.

== Reception ==
Professional ratings
Aggregate scores
Source	Rating
Metacritic	81/100
Review scores
Source	Rating
AbsolutePunk	8.3/10
AllMusic	4/5 stars
Punknews.org	4/5 stars
Ultimate Guitar	5/10

The album received generally favorable reviews. The album was included at number 46 on Kerrang!'s "The Top 50 Rock Albums Of 2014" list.

== Track listing ==
All songs written by Bayside, except "Hate Me" by Bayside, Shep Goodman, and Aaron Accetta.

No.	Title	Length
1.	"Big Cheese"	2:40
2.	"Time Has Come"	3:30
3.	"Hate Me"	2:54
4.	"You're No Match"	3:22
5.	"Pigsty"	3:55
6.	"Transitive Property"	3:55
7.	"Stuttering"	3:55
8.	"Bear with Me"	3:10
9.	"Objectivist on Fire"	3:59
10.	"Something's Wrong"	3:04
11.	"The Whitest Lie"	3:46
Total length:		38:10

White edition bonus tracks
No.	Title	Length
12.	"Dancing Like an Idiot"	3:27
13.	"Indiana"	2:58
14.	"Call Me"	3:04
15.	"Transitive Property" (Park Slope version)	3:50

== Personnel ==
Personnel per booklet.

Bayside

- Anthony Raneri – vocals, guitar
- Jack O'Shea – guitar
- Nick Ghanbarian – bass guitar
- Chris Guglielmo – drums

Additional musicians

- Dino Covelli – keys arrangement, string arrangement

Production and design

- Shep Goodman – producer, engineer
- Aaron Accetta – producer
- Dan Korneff – engineer
- Chris Sheldon – mixing
- John Naclerio – mastering
- Ronlewhorn – cover image, illustrations, album layout
- Mia Raneri – cover image
- Nick Ghanbarian – art direction

== Chart performance ==
Chart (2014)	Peak position
U.S. Billboard Vinyl Albums	1
