= Steve Soboslai =

American singer/songwriter (born 1980)

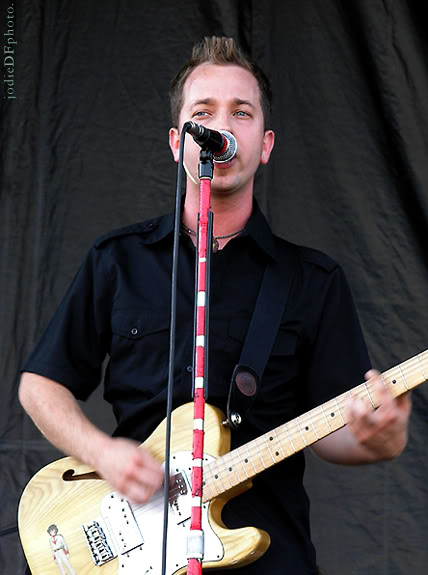
- Soboslai at the Starland Summer Campout at the Starland Ballroom in July 2006.

Background information
- Birth name: Steven Soboslai
- Born: October 30, 1980 (age 44)
- Origin: Belle Vernon, Pennsylvania, United States
- Genres: Pop punk, alternative rock, pop rock
- Instrument(s): Vocals, guitar
- Years active: 1997–present
- Labels: Modern Short Stories, Fueled by Ramen
- Website: www.modernshorties.com

Steve Soboslai (born October 30, 1980) is an American singer/songwriter. He is the lead singer and guitarist of the Belle Vernon, Pennsylvania-based pop punk band Punchline.

Soboslai has produced several records for various artists including Nightbeast (Thriving Records), Barely Blind (TDR Records), The Drama Summer (Eulogy Records), and ThirtySeven.

He appears on Bayside's 2005 self-titled release, singing back up vocals on the song "They Looked Like Strong Hands." Soboslai's also lent his vocal talent to the song "What a Waste of Time" for the Spontaneo album "For Those Who Can Whistle," as well as on the 2008 album "Columbus" by Andrew Dost of the band fun. He portrayed the villain in 6 songs on "Columbus."

In the summer of 2008, Soboslai and company started a record label called Modern Short Stories. Since their inception, they have released records for Punchline, The Composure, Spontaneo, Justin Oliver, and also a book by Chris Fafalios and Tony Hartman, called Whistle Pig.

In 2011 Soboslai began doing solo performances as "Blue of Colors." In his first performance he opened for Parachute and Plain White T's at the Indiana University of Pennsylvania student union. The most recent Blue of Colors album "Long Time Coming" was released on 2/24/23.

Soboslai provides additional vocals on "New Misery" by Israeli punk rock group Useless ID's latest album, Symptoms, released in 2012.

In the weeks leading up to the release of Punchline's new EP So Nice To Meet You, word broke that Soboslai would be on the television show "Mobbed" (aired 1/04/12) to declare his romantic feelings for a long-distance friend in the form of a musical flash mob. Thanks to this publicity coupled with a social media push by the bassist of Punchline (who stated that he would put down the bass if the EP did not reach No. 1 on iTunes), the record achieved the rank of No. 1 on the iTunes Rock charts and No. 7 on the main charts at its peak, as well as No. 4 on Billboard's Heatseekers charts.

== See also ==
- Punchline
- Modern Short Stories
- Fueled by Ramen
