= Dreamers (band) =

American pop rock trio

DREAMERS
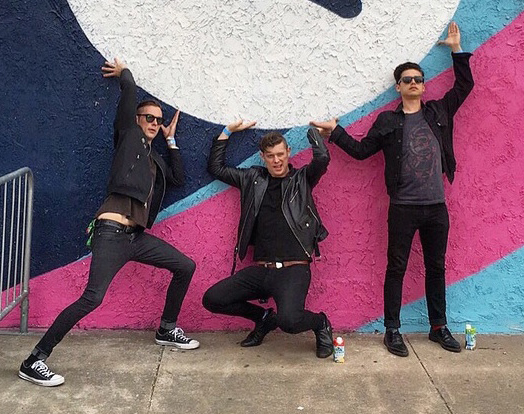
- Dreamers in 2016

Background information
- Origin: Manhattan, New York, U.S.
- Genres: Pop rock; alternative rock
- Years active: 2014–present
- Labels: Currently unrepresented; Fairfax; Hollywood
- Spinoff of: Motive
- Members: Nick Wold; Marc Nelson; Jessica Goodwin (touring); Ari Tibi (touring)
- Past members: Chris Bagamery; Jacob Lee Wick
- Website: dreamersuniverse.com

Dreamers (stylized as DREAMERS) is an American pop rock band, featuring Nick Wold, Marc Nelson and touring members Jessica Goodwin and Ari Tibi.

== History ==
=== Formation and first EP (2014) ===
Nick Wold moved from Seattle to New York at the age of 18 to study jazz saxophone at New York University's Steinhardt School. In New York, Wold was the lead singer and guitarist in the grunge band Motive, along with drummer Chris Bagamery, bassist Andrew McGovern, and lead guitarist David Leondi. McGovern, Bagamery, and Wold were longtime friends from Seattle who grew up playing jazz together. Wold met Leondi at NYU, and the trio became a quartet. Hailed as "The Strokes 2.0", Motive shared the stage with The Vaccines, Walk The Moon, Bear Hands, and were featured on MTV2's show 120 Minutes with Matt Pinfield, The New York Times, NYLON guys, and CBS News. The band toured the US several times, and had 9 showcases at SXSW in 2013.

Following the dissolution of Motive, Wold was living and writing songs in a Brooklyn rehearsal space. He and Bagamery met bassist Marc Nelson (known only by his surname), and the three teamed up to form the band.

Their first single, "Wolves (You Got Me)", was released on July 16, 2014, and was in rotation on SiriusXM's Alt Nation. It was included on their self-titled debut EP, produced by Danny Kalb, which was recorded at Ravensworth Studio outside Charlottesville, Virginia, and released on November 18, 2014. The four-track EP was streamed on Billboard a week ahead of its release date. In 2014, Alternative Press named Dreamers one of their 100 Bands You Need To Know.

=== You Are Here and This Album Does Not Exist (2015–2016) ===
In February 2015, Dreamers signed a deal with Fairfax Recordings. Drummer Jacob Lee Wick joined the band at the end of 2015, replacing Bagamery after they relocated to Los Angeles. That year, the trio started recording tracks with producer Kevin Agunas for their debut LP. On December 3, 2015, they released the video for their second single, "Shooting Shadows", off their second EP, You Are Here. The song was written by Wold and Atlas Genius lead singer Keith Jeffery. On February 5, 2016, You Are Here was released on Fairfax Recordings. It included their first single, "Wolves (You Got Me)", their new single "Drugs", and three additional tracks. The video for "Drugs" premiered on Billboard on March 2, 2016.

The first single off their debut LP This Album Does Not Exist was "Sweet Disaster", released on June 24, 2016. The album was released on August 26, 2016. Much of the album was written by Wold in Brooklyn before the band's relocation to Los Angeles.

=== EPs and Launch Fly Land (2018) ===
On July 13, 2018, Dreamers released Launch, a four-song EP. The EP serves as the first of a trilogy of releases. The album cover displays a picture of a SpaceX Falcon 9 at liftoff with a purple hue.

On September 7, 2018, Dreamers released Fly, a five-song EP and the second in the trilogy. It features the single "All Washed Out" and a stripped-down version of the single "Screws".

On February 21, 2019, "Die Happy" was released as the first single from what fans assumed was a third EP. However, on April 4, 2019, the band announced that their second album, Launch Fly Land, would be released April 26, 2019, which includes "Die Happy", and released the second single from the album, "Insomniac".

In April 2020, Dreamers released a new rendition of their single "Heat Seeker" with vocals from Grandson. The solo version is featured in the video game Just Dance 2021.

On April 1, 2022, ahead of their release of single "Black Confetti", Dreamers announced that drummer Jacob Lee Wick would be leaving the band.

On June 2, 2023, the band announced that they would be leaving the Dodging Sunshine tour prematurely due to a family emergency.

== Band members ==
- Nick Wold – lead vocals, guitar
- Marc Nelson - bass
- Jessica Goodwin (touring member) - drummer
- Ari Tibi (touring member) - instrumentalist

== Performances ==
Dreamers were selected to open for Stone Temple Pilots on their US tour in April and May 2015, at venues including The Fillmore in San Francisco, Aztec Theatre in San Antonio, House of Blues in Chicago, Irving Plaza in New York City and at SunFest in West Palm Beach. They were picked out of 500 bands who submitted to be the opener.

From December 2015 through April 2016, Dreamers went on tour across North America. This included their first foray into Canada, where they co-headlined with Arkells, joining the band onstage to perform a cover of George Harrison's version of "Got My Mind Set on You". The bands also covered David Bowie's "Modern Love" together, and Dreamers have separately covered Blind Melon's "No Rain".

Dreamers have also played with Atlas Genius, Civil Twilight, The Airborne Toxic Event, The Mowgli's, Young Rising Sons, The Vaccines, Weezer, Catfish and the Bottlemen, and All Time Low. They played Lollapalooza 2016 in Chicago, and have also put in appearances at Bumbershoot, Firefly, and Coachella along the way, and they went on a full US tour with The Griswolds in 2017 as well as with Night Riots in support of The Maine later that year. In 2018, they joined New Politics, alongside The Wrecks, on their Lost In Translation tour, named after their third album. In the fall of 2018, Dreamers went on their first US headlining tour with Weathers, Morgxn, and Rad Horror. February and March 2019 took them on a multi-city trip around the States for the North American leg of You Me At Six's international tour for their album VI. In 2019, they opened for Dirty Heads and 311.

== Discography ==
=== Albums ===
Title	Notes
This Album Does Not Exist	Release date: August 26, 2016; Label: Fairfax; Formats: CD, LP, digital download
Launch Fly Land	Release date: April 26, 2019; Label: Fairfax; Formats: CD, LP, digital download
Wallow in It	Release date: March 17, 2023; Label: Fairfax; Formats: CD, LP, digital download

=== Extended plays ===
Title	Notes
Dreamers EP	Release date: November 18, 2014; Label: Fairfax; Format: Digital download
You Are Here	Release date: February 5, 2016; Label: Fairfax; Format: Digital download
Launch	Release date: July 13, 2018; Label: Fairfax; Format: Digital download
Fly	Release date: September 7, 2018; Label: Fairfax; Format: Digital download
Palm Reader	Release date: March 5, 2021; Label: Fairfax; Format: Digital download

=== Singles ===
==== As lead artists ====
Title	Year	Peak chart positions		Album
Title	Year	US Alt.	US Rock	Album
"Wolves (You Got Me)"	2014	39	—	This Album Does Not Exist
"Shooting Shadows"	2015	—	—	This Album Does Not Exist
"Drugs"	2016	38	—	This Album Does Not Exist
"Sweet Disaster"	2016	7	33	This Album Does Not Exist
"Painkiller"	2016	29	—	This Album Does Not Exist
"Zombie"	2018	—	—	Non-album single
"All Washed Out"	2018	—	—	Fly EP
"Screws"	2018	20	— (Note: "Screws" did not enter the Hot Rock Songs chart, but peaked at number 37 on the Rock Airplay chart.)	Launch EP
"Die Happy"	2019	9	25	Launch Fly Land
"Desensitize"	2019	—	—	Non-album singles
"Heat Seeker" (ft. grandson)	2020	28	—	Non-album singles
"True Crime" (ft. DeathbyRomy)	2020	30	—	Palm Reader
"Still Not Dead" (with American Teeth and Wes Period)	2021	—	—	Palm Reader
"Palm Reader" (with Big Boi and UPSAHL)	2021	32	—	Palm Reader
"Body Language"	2022	—	—	Non-album singles
"Yoyo"	2025	—	—	Non-album singles
"—" denotes songs which were not released in that territory or did not chart.

==== As featuring artists ====
Title	Year	Peak chart positions	Album
Title	Year	US Alt.	Album
"I Wanna Be Your High" (Chad Tepper featuring Dreamers)	2020	35	TBA
"Clean Laundry" (Transviolet featuring Dreamers)	2021	—	TBA

=== Music videos ===
- "My Little Match" (2014, dir. Micah Weisberg & Bill Dvorak)
- "Waste My Night" (2014, did. Frank Young)
- "Wolves (You Got Me)" (2015, dir. Nikolai Vanyo)
- "Shooting Shadows" (2015, dir. Frank Young)
- "Drugs" (2016, dir. Frank Young)
- "Sweet Disaster" (2017, dir. Nic Collins)
- "Painkiller" (2017)
- "Screws" (2018, dir. Nick Wold) - [feat. cameos from members of Papa Roach, The Griswolds, Joywave, The Mowgli's, Mainland, Weathers, Rad Horror, Gnash, Morgxn, Matt Pinfield, as well as a screeching DeLorean (time machine)]
- "Die Happy" (2019, dir. Nick Wold)
- "Desensitize" (2019, dir. Phil Knott)
- "Heat Seeker" (2020, dir. Nick Wold)
- "Heat Seeker" ft. grandson (2020, dir. Andrew William Ralph)
- "True Crime" ft. DeathbyRomy (2020, dir. Jared Asher Harris)
- "Still Not Dead" ft. American Teeth, Wes Period (2021, dir. Joe Striff)
- "Palm Reader" ft. Big Boi, UPSAHL (2021, dir. Samuel Halleen and Joe Striffler)
- "Body Language" (2022, dir. Joe Mischo)

=== Collaborations ===
- Featured on Micky James' single "Rest of the Best" (November 2018, Dirty Canvas Records)
