= Micky James =

American singer-songwriter

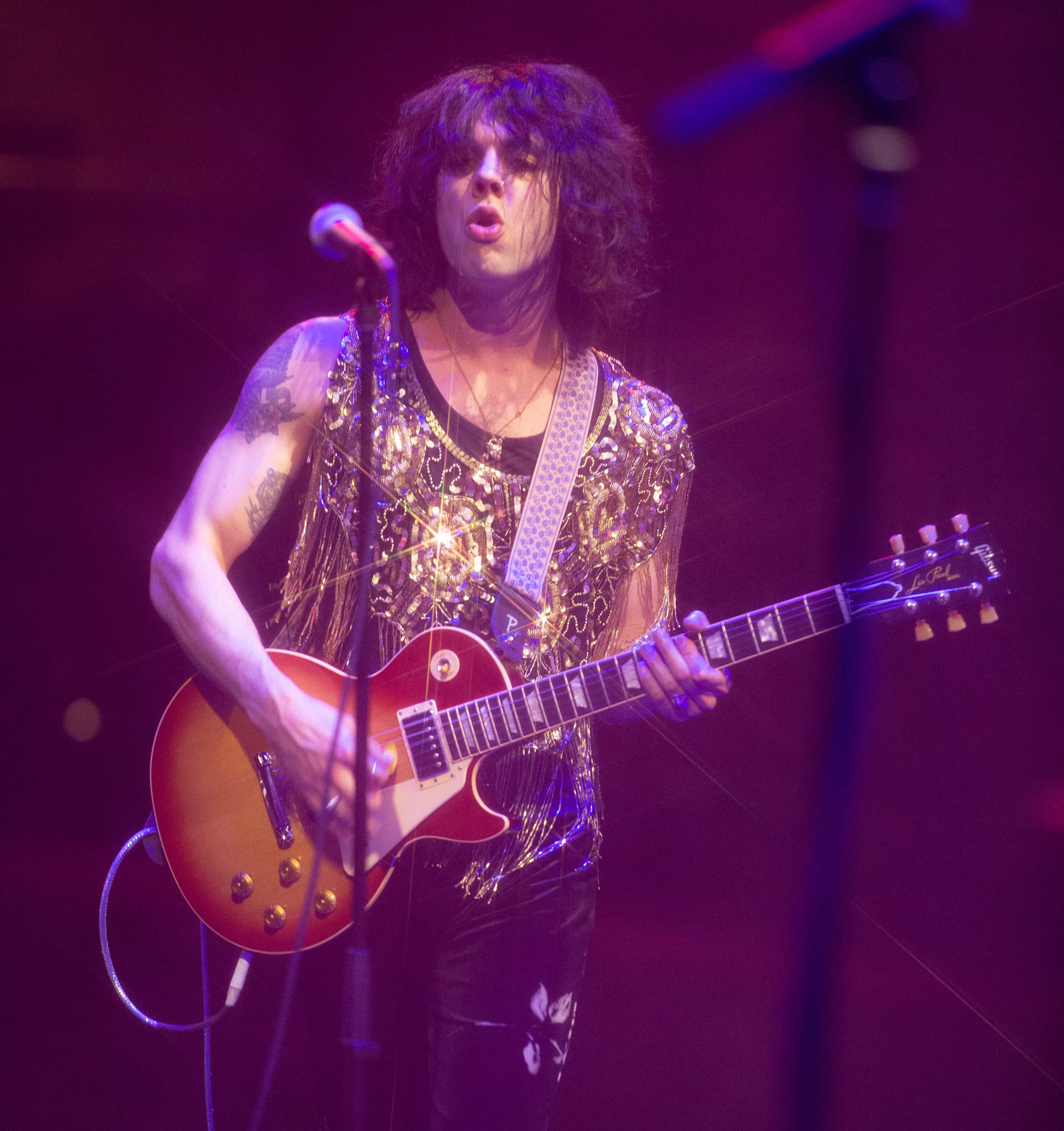

Background information
- Born: Princeton, New Jersey, US
- Genres: Glam rock, indie rock, pop
- Occupations: Singer, songwriter, musician
- Instruments: Vocals, guitar, bass guitar, drums
- Labels: Dirty Canvas Records, Island Records

Michael James Muccigrossi, better known by his stage name Micky James, is an American singer, songwriter, and musician.

== Life and career ==
=== Early life ===
Micky James was born Michael James Muccigrossi in Princeton, New Jersey, United States.

James was introduced to music at an early age. He has stated that seeing a videotape of the Beatles’ appearance on the Ed Sullivan show “ultimately led [him] into being a performer and a guitar player and down the road a song writer.”

James spent his formative years playing in bands. He toured extensively with his last group, the Karma Killers, before they disbanded in 2018.

=== 2018–present: Solo career ===
James released his debut single “Give It To Me Straight” in 2018, with the song premiering on Billboard and Sirius XM’s Alt Nation’s Advanced Placement. Soon after, he made his Los Angeles debut at the Roxy Theater supporting the Struts.

James's 2018 single “Rest of the Best (feat. Dreamers)" was added to regular rotation on Sirius XM’s Alt Nation. After its release, he joined Alt Nation’s Advanced Placement Tour featuring the Regrettes and Welles.

In 2019, James released the singles “Walk the Line” and “Cry Baby.”

On July 31, 2020 his most recent single “Kings” premiered via Wonderland Magazine. The song was featured on Spotify’s New Noise playlist and garnered critical acclaim, with one critic calling it “a cool six-stringed groove fest with a message” and another “a defiant uprising of the generationally damned and disgruntled, as well as the most authentic rock n’ roll you’ve heard in years.”

== Musical style and influences ==
James has been compared to David Bowie, the Clash, T. Rex, and the Rolling Stones.

He also counts early-aughts New York City bands such as the Strokes and Yeah Yeah Yeahs as influences, stating that the Strokes’ debut album Is This It “got me into singing...when I listened to that record, I kind of found my voice.”

== Discography ==
=== Singles ===
- "Give It To Me Straight" (January 2018, Dirty Canvas Records)
- "Tie Me Up" (October 2018, Dirty Canvas Records)
- "New Heart" (October 2018, Dirty Canvas Records)
- "Rest of the Best feat. Dreamers" (November 2018, Dirty Canvas Records)
- "Walk the Line" (March 2019, Dirty Canvas Records)
- "Cry Baby" (September 2019, Dirty Canvas Records)
- "Kings" (July 2020, Dirty Canvas Records)
- "Shiver" (June 2021, Dirty Canvas Records)
- "Not Okay" (September 2021, Dirty Canvas Records)
- "New York Minute" (January 2023, BMG)
- “James Brown” (March 2023, BMG)
