= Thrilled (album) =

Studio album by Punchline
- Released: December 4, 2015
- Genre: Pop punk
- Length: 40:41
- Label: InVogue Records
- Producer: Marc McClusky

Punchline chronology
So Nice to Meet You (2012)	Thrilled (2015)	LION (2018)

Thrilled is the seventh studio album by the pop punk band Punchline, released as a follow-up to 2012's So Nice To Meet You through InVogue Records on December 4, 2015 and distributed by Warner Music Group.

It is noted to be the group's most eclectic effort yet.

== Track listing ==
1. "Thrilled" – 3:35
2. "Now I See" – 4:04
3. "Tell Me How You Sleep" – 4:20
4. "No Stopping Us" – 3:58
5. "Telephone Pole" – 4:33
6. "Let It Rise" – 3:23
7. "Oh, Sierra" – 4:09
8. "Answer Me" – 3:27
9. "Simulation" – 4:32
10. "Green Hills" – 4:40
