= So Nice to Meet You =

EP by Punchline
- Released: January 3, 2012
- Genre: Pop punk
- Label: Modern Short Stories

Punchline chronology
Delightfully Pleased (2010)	So Nice to Meet You (2012)	Thrilled (2015)

So Nice to Meet You is the third EP by the pop punk band Punchline, released through Modern Short Stories on January 3, 2012.

Its success was attributed to word of mouth, social networking and a strong fan base created over the previous 14 years.

== Track listing ==
1. "Universe" – 3:29
2. "Everything I Wanted" – 3:06
3. "I Swear I've Been Here Before" – 3:34
4. "Very Nervous System" – 2:55
5. "I Want You to Want Me" – 3:57

== Charts ==
Chart (2011–12)	Peak position
US Billboard 200	141
US Heatseekers Albums	4
US Rock Albums	29
US Independent Albums	16
US Alternative Albums	23
