= Killing Time (Bayside album) =

Studio album by Bayside
- Released: February 22, 2011
- Recorded: June–August 2010
- Studio: Dreamland (Hurley, New York)
- Genre: Punk rock; melodic hardcore; emo; alternative rock; post-hardcore
- Length: 35:57
- Label: Wind-up
- Producer: Gil Norton

Bayside chronology
| Shudder (2008) | Killing Time (2011) | Cult (2014) |

Singles from Killing Time
- 1. "Sick, Sick, Sick" Released: November 16, 2010; 2. "Already Gone" Released: August 22, 2011

Professional ratings
Aggregate scores
| Source | Rating |
|---|---|
| Metacritic | 84/100 |
Review scores
| Source | Rating |
| AbsolutePunk | 93% |
| AllMusic | 4/5 stars |
| Blare | 3.5/5 stars |
| IGN | 8.5/10 |
| Punknews.org | 3.5/5 stars |
| Spin | 8/10 stars |
| Sputnikmusic | 3.5/5 |

Killing Time is the fifth studio album by American rock band Bayside.

== Background and production ==
On March 12, 2010, it was announced that they group had signed to major label Wind-up Records and were expected to release their next album in the fall. The album was produced by famed British producer Gil Norton, who has previously worked with such bands as the Pixies, Foo Fighters and Jimmy Eat World.

== Release ==
In August 2010, Raneri said the group were planning to have their next album out in early 2011. On October 6, Killing Time was announced for release in February 2011, and revealed the track listing. The group then embarked on the Out with the In Crowd Tour where they debuted new material from the album. On the tour, the group were giving away download cards which allowed fans to digitally download "Already Gone". On October 15, the album's artwork was revealed. On October 18, "Already Gone" was made a available for streaming. On November 15, "Sick, Sick, Sick" was made available for streaming and released as a single a day later.

On February 3, 2011, "Mona Lisa" was made available for streaming via Alternative Press' website. On February 10, a music video was released for "Sick, Sick, Sick". Killing Time was made available for streaming on February 16, before being released on February 22 through Wind-up Records. The iTunes version of the album included the bonus tracks "Don't Come Easy" and "Monster". "Sick, Sick, Sick" was released to radio on February 22. In April and May, the band co-headlined the Take Action Tour with Silverstein. They were supported by Polar Bear Club, The Swellers and Texas in July. In July, the group went on a headlining US tour with support from Transit.

"Already Gone" was released as a radio single on August 23. In October and November, the band went on a co-headlining US tour with Saves the Day, with support from I Am the Avalanche and Transit. To coincide with the tour, the four groups each contributed one track to a four-way split single. Bayside's contribution was a demo of "Sick, Sick, Sick". In February 2012, the band performed four headline shows with support by The Sidekicks. followed by an appearance at Musink festival in early March. The group then performed one-off shows in the Midwest of the US, before embarking on Warped Tour for the summer. In October and November, the group went on tour with Taking Back Sunday, celebrating the 10th anniversary of Taking Back Sunday's Tell All Your Friends.

== Track listing ==
All tracks are written by Bayside.

Killing Time track listing
| No. | Title | Length |
|---|---|---|
| 1. | "Already Gone" | 3:40 |
| 2. | "Sick, Sick, Sick" | 3:34 |
| 3. | "Mona Lisa" | 3:10 |
| 4. | "It's Not a Bad Little War" | 4:12 |
| 5. | "Sinking and Swimming on Long Island" | 3:48 |
| 6. | "Seeing Sound" | 3:23 |
| 7. | "The Wrong Way" | 3:26 |
| 8. | "On Love, On Life" | 3:26 |
| 9. | "The New Flesh" | 3:45 |
| 10. | "Killing Time" | 3:33 |
| Total length: | | 35:57 |

iTunes bonus tracks
| No. | Title | Length |
|---|---|---|
| 11. | "Don't Come Easy" | 3:33 |
| 12. | "Monster" (pre-order only) | 2:36 |

10th anniversary vinyl bonus tracks
| No. | Title | Length |
|---|---|---|
| 1. | "Battle Scars" (B-side) |
| 2. | "Monster" (B-side) |
| 3. | "It Don't Come Easy" (B-side) |
| 4. | "Saddest Song" (B-side) |
| 5. | "Sick, Sick, Sick" (Demo) |
| 6. | "Already Gone" (Demo) |
| 7. | "Mona Lisa" (Demo) |
| 8. | "Killing Time" (Demo) |
| 9. | "It's Not a Bad Little War" (8-Bit) |
| 10. | "Seeing Sound" (8-Bit) |

== Personnel ==
- Anthony Raneri – lead vocals, rhythm guitar
- Jack O'Shea – lead guitar, backing vocals
- Nick Ghanbarian – bass guitar
- Chris Guglielmo – drums, percussion
