= The Goodwill =

- Origin: Long Island, New York, United States
- Genres: Post-hardcore; Pop-punk
- Years active: 2001–2006
- Labels: Abacus Recordings; Negative Progression Records
- Past members: Travis Johnides; Greg Oechslin; Brian DiCosmo; Dan Sanchez; Josh Moskoviz; Jay Giacomazzo; Brian Barbuto

The Goodwill was a post-hardcore band from Long Island, New York formed in 2001. They released two full-length albums- 'That Was a Moment' on Negative Progression Records in 2003 and 'Insult, Injury, Etc...' on Abacus Recordings in 2005.

== Discography ==
=== Albums ===
- "That Was a Moment" Released on February 11, 2003, on Negative Progression Records
- "Insult, Injury, Etc..." Released on March 8, 2005, on Abacus Recordings
