= Punchline (band) =

American rock band

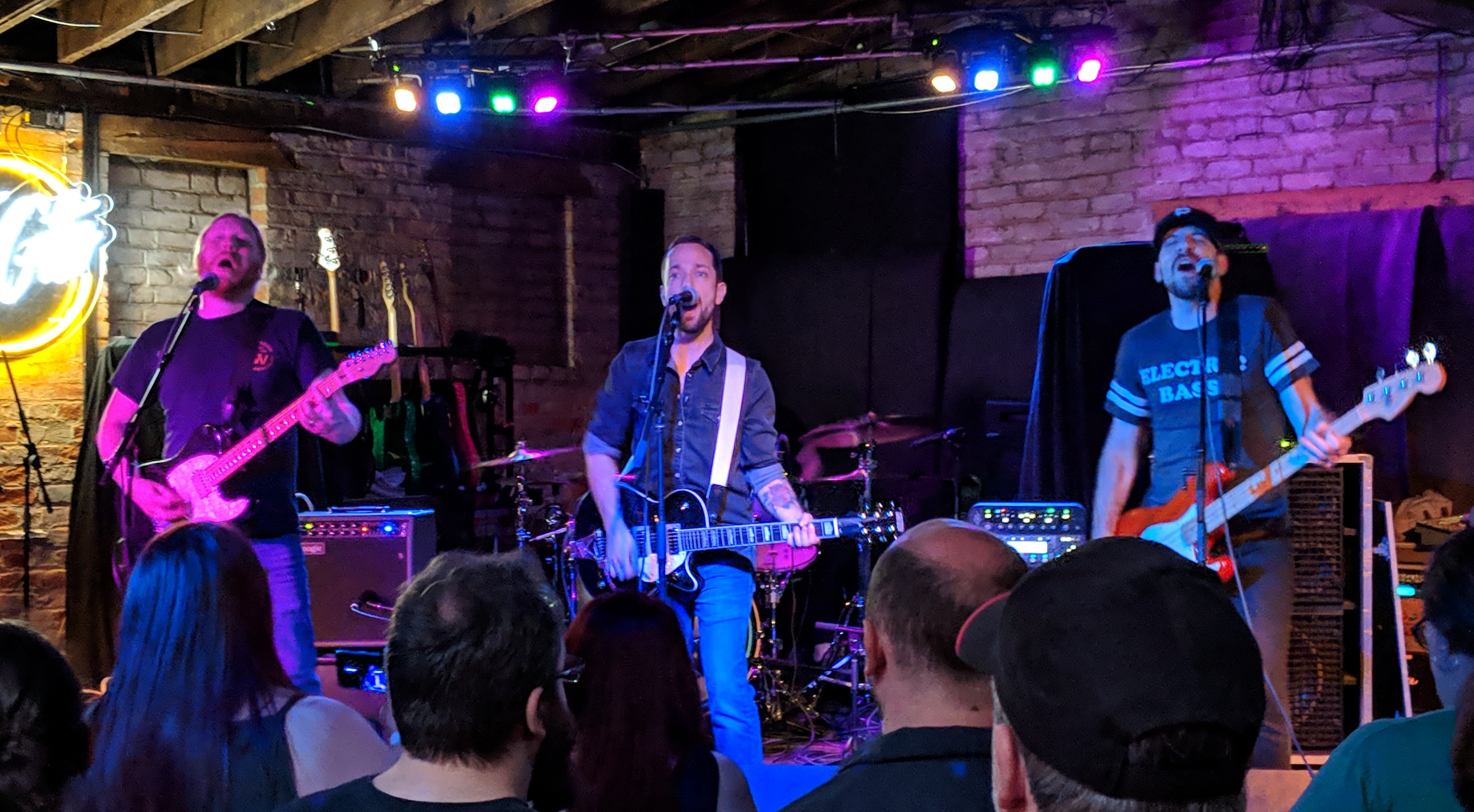
- Punchline performing on tour with Less Than Jake at Top Cats in the Clifton neighborhood of Cincinnati, Ohio, April 2019

Background information
- Origin: Belle Vernon, Pennsylvania, U.S.
- Genre: Pop punk
- Years active: 1998–present
- Labels: Modern Short Stories; Fueled by Ramen
- Members: Steve Soboslai; Chris Fafalios; Trevor Leonard; Cory Muro; Paul Menotiades
- Past members: Jon Belan; PJ Caruso; Greg Wood; Pat Dee

Punchline is an American rock band from Belle Vernon, Pennsylvania south of Pittsburgh that was formed in 1998. The band released its ninth full-length album, Somewhere to Land, on September 12, 2025.

== History ==
=== 1998–2002: early years ===
Punchline was formed in 1997 as a three-piece band consisting of Steve Soboslai (lead vocals, guitar), Chris Fafalios (bass guitar), and PJ Caruso (drums). At the time, Fafalios was a senior in high school and Caruso and Soboslai were juniors. They played local shows and recorded their first album, How to Get Kicked Out of the Mall, a blend of pop- and ska-influenced punk. In later recordings, the ska influence became less prominent. In 1999, the band self-produced and self-released the full-length Punchline album.

After being joined by Paul Menotiades (guitar, vocals), they recorded and co-produced Major Motion Picture with Billy Rossi for an August 2001 release. The four collaborated with Rossi again in 2002 on The Rewind EP. The EP's four tracks marked a transition into what became their signature pop-punk sound.

=== 2003–2005: gaining popularity, Fueled by Ramen ===
In 2003, the band signed to Fueled by Ramen. The Rewind EP was remixed and remastered by Shelly Yakus for its Fueled by Ramen re-release. Early pressings included The Rewind Documentary DVD, a collection of footage of the band. In February 2004, Punchline released the album, Action, produced by Sean O'Keefe. Soboslai, Menotiades and Fafalios all sang on the disc and the first 10,000 pressings also included a DVD entitled The Action DVD.

During a tour, Menotiades left the band. The remaining members enlisted Greg Wood, a long-time friend, to fill in on guitar and vocals for the remaining shows. Wood, who also performed as a solo artist and was a member of the now defunct Connecticut band West Beverly, later joined as a permanent member, and played keyboards and piano in addition to guitar on Punchline's 2006 release 37 Everywhere. In 2005, TDR Records (formerly known as To Define Records) released an Over It/Punchline split 7-inch vinyl with two exclusive songs. The Over It side has an acoustic version of "Partner in Crime", and the Punchline side has a previously unreleased acoustic version of "Battlescars".

=== 2006: 37 Everywhere ===
37 Everywhere, produced by Shep Goodman and Kenny Gioia, was released by Fueled by Ramen on April 11, 2006. The album is dedicated to the life and times of John "Beatz" Holohan (1974–2005), the former drummer of Bayside. The album's title refers to a theory suggesting that 37 is the most commonly seen number. The album's liner notes say, "The number 37 is everywhere. It is in your daily routine and it will surprise you. Look for it and it will look for you." Jason Sho Green, the artist/designer for the album, says the liner notes contain 37 instances of the number 37.

The album has guest vocals by Anthony Raneri of Bayside, a band from Queens, New York and Vinnie Caruana of I Am the Avalanche and formerly The Movielife on "Flashlight", John Johansen of the defunct Stryder on "Caller 10", and Josh Bonner of the defunct Unsung Zeros on "Wars Will Always Happen", as well as guest guitarist Ryan Mendez of Yellowcard on "Don't Try This at Home".

On August 28, 2006, the band announced the departure of Wood. Wood is said to be in good standing with the band and left to pursue other interests, specifically a solo career and teaching guitar. He was replaced by Jon Belan, a long-time Punchline friend and a former member of The Berlin Project and the lead singer of Gene The Werewolf. His first tour with Punchline was the "Better Than Knowing Where You Are Tour", headlined by Spitalfield with support from Over It, Valencia, Peachcake, and Boys Like Girls.

=== 2008: Just Say Yes and Modern Short Stories ===
Punchline's follow-up to 37 Everywhere was recorded in 2007 in two parts. Part 1 was recorded at Room Sound Studios in Tempe, Arizona with producer Jamie Woolford (formerly of The Stereo and now a member of the band Let Go). Part 2 was recorded at Smart Studios in Madison, Wisconsin with Sean O'Keefe, who produced Punchline's album Action.

On February 8, 2008, the band announced its departure from Fueled By Ramen in a brief statement:

"After many years on fueled by ramen its time for us to move on, after fulfilling the obligations of our contract with FBR we decided that we wanted to look for a new home. Armed with a new record that's already recorded we are excited to move on to something new. Thanks to the people at FBR that supported us and helped us it means a lot. One door closes and one opens."

On July 11, 2008, Punchline created their independent label, Modern Short Stories, using the winnings ($25,000) from Heavy.com's Contraband Contest. On "37 day" (March 7) 2008, Punchline announced in their AIM chatroom that the new album would be called Just Say Yes. Preceded by "How Does This Happen?", the album was released on September 16, 2008. A four-song bonus disc, Just Say Maybe, was included with the first 500 pre-ordered copies.

=== 2009: more line-up changes and Night Lights ===
On January 27, 2009, Punchline announced the departure of its long-time drummer and original member Caruso. In a blog entry posted the same day, Soboslai told readers that the split was amicable and announced a temporary stand-in for already scheduled shows. He reassured fans that they planned on making music for a long time to come, and announced plans for a spring 2009 tour and DVD release, as well as a new album.

On May 3, 2009, Punchline premiered their new music video for "Ghostie" On August 30, 2009, Punchline offered the new song "Heart of Gold" for free download, but those who paid $3 or more received 5 bonus songs, including rare Punchline tracks.

On September 12, 2009, during a hometown show in Pittsburgh on the AbsolutePunk.net Next Favorite Band Tour, Punchline asked the temporary drummer Pat Dee, formerly of the band Victory Lane, to become a permanent member. Punchline announced the departure of Belan later that week. Menotiades returned to replace Belan for the fall 2009 US tour and later rejoined the band. On December 1, 2009, Punchine released a digital collection of unreleased songs called Night Lights.

=== 2010–2011: Delightfully Pleased ===
Beginning in May, Punchline recorded with Jamie Woolford at Innovation Studios in Steubenville, Ohio south of Youngstown. Somewhere around this time, Pat Dee was let go from the band. Drummer Cory Muro, of Paul Menotiades' other band The Composure, was brought into the band as a full-time member.

A couple of weeks after their recording sessions were completed, Punchline released a song for fans of the television series Lost, a single rough mix track entitled "Roller Coaster Smoke". The track was released on the day of the Lost series finale. The official music video was released on July 23, 2010. It was directed by Joe DeWitt, a Pittsburgh filmmaker and comedian.

On June 24, Punchline revealed that the new album would be called Delightfully Pleased and it would be released on August 10, by Modern Short Stories and TDR Records. The artwork was also released and the first song, "21 Forever", was released on their newly relaunched web site, PunchKids.com, on July 18. According to the band, this was their best album yet.

=== 2012–2015: So Nice to Meet You and Thrilled ===
On January 3, 2012, Punchline released a new EP exclusively on iTunes called So Nice To Meet You. The band had a social media push to get to No. 1 on the iTunes charts. On January 4, 2012, the album peaked at No. 7 on iTunes Overall charts and No. 1 in the Rock category. So Nice to Meet You also reached No. 4 on Billboard's Heatseekers charts, No. 29 Rock Albums, No. 16 Independent Albums and No. 23 Alternative Albums. Punchline appeared on the Fox reality television show Mobbed broadcast on April 1, 2012. Soboslai performed the Cheap Trick classic "I Want You to Want Me" with a flash mob for a long-distance friend Dana to profess his interest in a relationship.

On January 19, 2015, Punchline announced their seventh full-length record titled "Thrilled" via their Facebook page with a release window of 2015. On March 10, 2015, a music video for the single "Thrilled" off the upcoming album "Thrilled" was released on Chris Fafalios's (the band's bassist) YouTube channel.

In December 2015, Punchline launched two full album streams ahead of the album release and embarked on a 5-city tour in support of their newest album Thrilled, briefly joining Bayside's Holiday tour for a Philadelphia date.

=== 2017–2018: Punchline Music Special Kickstarter and LION ===
On April 13, 2017, the Kickstarter to create a Punchline Music Special was successfully funded. On November 15, 2017, Punchline concluded filming of the live music portion of the special in their hometown of Pittsburgh.

Punchline announced a new full-length record titled "Lion" the next year, shortly before releasing the album which includes previous singles "Darkest Dark" (ft Matt Thiessen) and "It's an New Year (Don't Be So Hard on Yourself)." For the release, Dancing Gnome Beer created a limited edition Punchlion IPA, clocking in at 7% abv and hopped with Citra, Simcoe, Amarillo, Mosaic, Ekuanot, Columbus, and Chinook hops. It was presented on tap at the 3/31 Mr. Smalls Theatre "Lion" album release show and available for purchase at the brewery.

Punchline also performed at a TEDxPittsburgh event called "Small Worlds, Big Ideas" on June 16, 2018. The band is currently on tour with The Spill Canvas and Selfish Things to support the Spill Canvas's new EP release ("Part of the Hive" tour). Punchline took time in between dates to play a show with 1990s rock heroes Gin Blossoms and Tonic in Pittsburgh.

=== 2019–21: Touring, covers, and new releases ===
In February 2019, Punchline continued to play with Gin Blossoms to support the New Miserable Experience 25th Anniversary Tour. Throughout 2019, the band released a cover of Less Than Jake's "Automatic", an EP titled Songs From '94, and a cover of the Ghostbusters theme song via Cleopatra Records.

In 2020, they released the "Just Stay Home" single, commemorating the COVID-19 pandemic with fan footage, as well as the Punchline Music Special (later available on Amazon Prime streaming). Punchline continued the release schedule with a 2021 single "Be Right There" produced by Marc McClusky, and a new holiday original song titled "I Won't Let You Down (This Christmas)", rounding out their collection of Christmas songs.

In March 2024, Patrick Stump of Fall Out Boy covered Punchline's "Heart Transplant" at their concert at PPG Paints Arena in Pittsburgh, PA

On September 12 of 2025, Punchline released the album Somewhere to Land. They released the record two days before performing at the Four Chord Music Festival.

== Touring ==
Punchline has toured the United States extensively. In spring 2005, they embarked on their first proper headlining tour, "The Now or Never Tour". Notable acts they shared the stage with at this time include Catch 22, Allister, Spitalfield, Hidden In Plain View, The Fold, Audio Karate, Less Than Jake, Mest, Start Trouble, and MxPx. In June 2009, Punchline co-headlined the Major/Minor Tour with Socratic.

In September 2009, Punchline set out on the AbsolutePunk Next Favorite Band Tour with Farewell, Between The Trees, and Action Item. They toured with Hawthorne Heights, Just Surrender, Monty Are I, and Nightbeast during Hawthorne Heights' 2009 Never Sleep Again tour.

Internationally, the band has a sizable following in Japan. In summer 2004, Punchline toured Japan with then-labelmates Fall Out Boy, and, in June 2006, they headlined a Japanese tour with support from Paramore and October Fall. In May 2007, Punchline toured the United Kingdom for the first time as a supporting act on the Good To Go Tour 2007 with rotating headliners Wheatus, MC Lars, and Army Of Freshmen. In February 2008, Punchline toured the UK again with MxPx and The Get Go on the fourth installment of the Good To Go Tour.

In 2019, Punchline toured the Eastern U.S. with Less Than Jake.

In February 2019, Punchline toured with Gin Blossoms as part of their New Miserable Experience anniversary tour.

== Members ==
=== Current members ===
- Steve Soboslai – vocals, guitar (1998–present)
- Chris Fafalios – bass guitar, vocals (1998–present)
- Trevor Leonard – guitar, vocals (2015–present)
- Cory Muro – drums, vocals (2010–present)
- Paul Menotiades – guitar, vocals (1999–2005, 2009–2013, 2024-present)
- PJ Caruso- drums (1998–2009, 2024–present)

=== Former members ===
- Greg Wood – guitar, vocals (2005–2006)
- PJ Caruso – drums (1998–2009)
- Jon Belan – guitar, vocals, keyboards (2006–2009)
- Pat Dee – drums, percussion (2009–2010)

== Discography ==
=== Albums ===
Release date	Title	Label
1998	How to Get Kicked Out of the Mall	Self-released
June 1, 1999	Punchline	Self-released
February 24, 2004	Action	Fueled by Ramen
April 11, 2006	37 Everywhere	Fueled by Ramen
September 16, 2008	Just Say Yes	Modern Short Stories
August 10, 2010	Delightfully Pleased	Modern Short Stories/TDR Records
December 4, 2015	Thrilled	InVogue Records
March 30, 2018	LION	InVogue
September 12, 2025	Somewhere to Land	Punchline Music

=== EPs ===
Release date	Title	Label
2001	Major Motion Picture	Self-released
2002; 2003 (reissue)	The Rewind EP	Self-released; Fueled by Ramen (reissue)
2012	So Nice To Meet You	Modern Short Stories

=== Compilations ===
Release date	Title	Label
December 1, 2009	Night Lights	Modern Short Stories
2004	Dead and Dreaming: An Indie Tribute to Counting Crows – "Round Here"	Victory Records
September 2004	Punk the Clock	PTC
November 25, 2016	Happy Holidays, I Miss You	InVogue Records
May 7, 2013	Politefully Dead	Modern Short Stories

== Other sources ==
- "Fueled by Ramen – Bands – Punchline". Archived from the original on November 23, 2005.
- "PunchMania". Archived from the original on March 26, 2005.
- "Antidote Apparel".
- "Press". Archived from the original on November 18, 2006.
- "Illout.com - Punchline Interview from pittpunk.com". Archived from the original on September 29, 2007.
