= Modern Short Stories =

Pittsburgh-based record label, 2008–2017

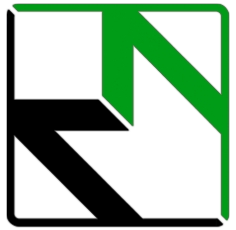
- Founded: 2008
- Founder: Steve Soboslai, Chris Fafalios, Amanda Yu
- Defunct: 2017
- Genre: Pop punk Indie rock
- Country of origin: U.S.
- Location: Pittsburgh, Pennsylvania
- Official website: www.modernshortstories.net

Modern Short Stories is a Pittsburgh-based "media label" founded by Steve Soboslai and Chris Fafalios of the Pittsburgh pop punk band Punchline and friend Amanda Yu. Its slogan is "Every song is a modern short story."

== History ==
=== Creation ===
Modern Short Stories was created during summer 2008 in the fall-out of Punchline's departure from Fueled by Ramen Records. Between 2003 and early 2008, Fueled by Ramen released two full-length Punchline albums (2004's Action and 2006's 37 Everywhere), as well as a re-release of 2002's The Rewind EP. During this time, a number of their then-labelmates (Fall Out Boy, Panic! at the Disco, The Academy Is..., The Hush Sound, etc.) were becoming hugely popular, and Punchline became less prominent in the Fueled by Ramen lineup.

The seed that would become Modern Short Stories was sown in July 2007 when Heavy.com announced Punchline the $25,000 grand-prize winner of their Contraband Contest, in which bands competed for views on videos uploaded to the site. Over the course of the contest, Punchline uploaded 65 videos (including clips of Punchline in the studio) and netted nearly 1.2 million views, due in large part to the efforts of bassist Chris Fafalios to mobilize the band's fanbase.

=== Releases ===
On September 18, 2008, Punchline's own Just Say Yes became the first album released on Modern Short Stories.

On February 2, 2009, in accordance with their self-described position as a "media label", Modern Short Stories released Whistle Pig, a collection of short stories, poetry, and illustrations written by friends Chris Fafalios and Tony Hartman. The two previously collaborated on a "YouToon" (a term coined by Fafalios referring to any cartoon uploaded to YouTube) called Texas Toast. According to the book's Myspace page:

Whistle Pig is a children's book for people who used to be children. Within these pages you'll find a treasury of thought-provoking and hilarious poetry, illustrations, and (masculine) fairy tales written by Tony Hartman and Chris Fafalios. These two (straight) buddies have figured out the formula for comedic cartoon poetry while spending Saturday afternoons drawing, writing, and laughing. The result is a magical journey through the whistle pig ranch of the mind. Enjoy this lesson in cartoon poetry science. Oh, and there's probably some fables in here as well ...

Modern Short Stories is slated to release Justin Oliver's new album in "early 2009", according to an October 2008 entry in Steve Soboslai's "Modern Shorties" blog.

According to Punchline's Myspace, Modern Short Stories will release a Punchline DVD in spring 2009, followed by a full-length album by year's end.

The label's facebook hasn't been updated since 2017.

== Roster ==
- Punchline
- Justin Oliver
- Spontaneo
- The Composure
