= Vacancy (Bayside album) =

Studio album by Bayside
- Released: August 19, 2016
- Recorded: March–April 2016
- Genre: Indie rock; power pop; punk rock
- Length: 39:34
- Label: Hopeless
- Producer: Tim O’Heir

Bayside chronology
Cult (2014)	Vacancy (2016)	Interrobang (2019)

Vacancy is the seventh studio album by American rock band Bayside released on August 19, 2016 through Hopeless Records.

== Background ==
Vacancy was recorded in March and April 2016 in Nashville, Tennessee, with producer Tim O'Heir. He acted as engineer, with additional engineering from Arun Bali of Saves the Day. Chris Sheldon mixed the album, before it was mastered by Howie Weinberg.

== Release ==
On April 26, 2016, Vacancy was announced for release in August. In addition, the album's artwork was revealed. On May 13, "Enemy Lines" was made available for streaming and the album's track listing was revealed. A music video was released for "Pretty Vacant" on June 9, directed by Justin Giritlian and Nathan Sam. Vacancy was released on August 19 through Hopeless Records. In August and September, the group went on a headlining tour of the US with support from the Menzingers and Sorority Noise. In April and May 2017, the group went on co-headlining US tour with Say Anything with support from Reggie and the Full Effect and Hot Rod Circuit. To promote the tour, Bayside covered Say Anything's "Night's Songs", while Say Anything covered Bayside's "They're Not Horses, They're Unicorns". In September, the band performed at Riot Fest.

== Reception ==
The album received favorable reviews from fans and critics.

Metacritic gives the album a score of 72 based on six critics

== Track listing ==
All songs written by Anthony Raneri, Jack O'Shea, Nick Ghanbarian, and Chris Guglielmo, except "Mary" by Raneri, O'Shea, Ghanbarian, Guglielmo, and Chris Carrabba.

No.	Title	Length
1.	"Two Letters"	4:06
2.	"I've Been Dead All Day"	3:14
3.	"Enemy Lines"	3:27
4.	"Not Fair"	3:53
5.	"Pretty Vacant"	3:09
6.	"Rumspringa (Return to Heartbreak Road)"	3:20
7.	"Mary"	3:38
8.	"Maybe, Tennessee"	4:03
9.	"The Ghost"	3:17
10.	"It Doesn't Make It True"	3:43
11.	"It's Not as Depressing as It Sounds"	3:58
Total length:		39:34

== Personnel ==
Personnel per booklet.

Bayside

- Anthony Raneri – vocals, guitar
- Jack O'Shea – guitar
- Nick Ghanbarian – bass guitar
- Chris Guglielmo – drums

Additional musicians

- Rob Crowell – keys
- Steve Soboslai – additional programming

Production and design

- Tim O'Heir – producer, engineer
- Chris Sheldon – mixing
- Howie Weinberg – mastering
- Arun Bali – additional engineering
- Jason Link – album design
- Jani Zubkovs – cover photo
- Rowan Daly – additional photos
- Megan Thompson – band photos

== Charts ==
Chart (2016)	Peak position
US Billboard 200	69
US Billboard Vinyl Albums	2
