= Acoustic (Bayside EP) =

EP by Bayside
- Released: February 28, 2006
- Recorded: December 12 and 13, 2005, Chicago Recording Company, Chicago, IL
- Genre: Alternative rock; emo
- Length: 28:20
- Label: Victory
- Producer: Shep Goodman & Kenny Gioia

Bayside chronology
Bayside (2005)	Acoustic (2006)	The Walking Wounded (2007)

Professional ratings
Review scores
Source	Rating
AllMusic	3.5/5 stars
Wondering Sound	Favorable

Acoustic is an EP by American rock band Bayside, released on February 28, 2006. The release was in memory of John "Beatz" Holohan, the band's drummer who was killed when the band's tour bus crashed on October 31, 2005. By April 2006, the EP had sold over 13,000 copies. By August 2008, the EP had sold 37,000 copies.

== CD ==
The CD includes seven studio-recorded acoustic songs (five of which had been previously released non-acoustically on past albums, and two of which were new), two previously unreleased non-acoustic songs (one of which was an Elliott Smith cover), and one live acoustic song.

The song "Winter", one of the new acoustic songs, was specifically dedicated to Holohan, and the song "Megan", the other new acoustic song, is a cover of a Smoking Popes song and features guest vocals from the Smoking Popes' lead singer, Josh Caterer.

=== Track listing ===
No.	Title	Length
1.	"Winter"	4:29
2.	"Blame It on Bad Luck"	3:53
3.	"They Looked Like Strong Hands"	4:36
4.	"Masterpiece"	4:00
5.	"Megan" (Smoking Popes cover featuring Josh Caterer of the Smoking Popes)	3:26
6.	"Montauk"	4:03
7.	"Devotion and Desire"	3:55
Total length:		28:20

Bonus tracks
No.	Title	Length
8.	"Baby Britain" (Elliott Smith cover)	2:55
9.	"Paternal Reversal"	3:29
10.	"Don't Call Me Peanut" (live)	4:52
Total length:		39:33

== DVD ==
The DVD includes an acoustic set of the band's performance at the House of Blues, Chicago, on the Never Sleep Again Tour in 2005, a "making of the album" video, and a montage segment in memory of Holohan. The songs from the live performance that are found on the DVD include six of the seven studio-recorded acoustic songs found on the CD, with the exception of "Winter". Instead, the song "Don't Call Me Peanut" appears, which coincidentally is the live track found on the CD.

=== Track listing ===
1. "Masterpiece"
2. "They Looked Like Strong Hands"
3. "Megan"
4. "Blame It On Bad Luck"
5. "Montauk"
6. "Don't Call Me Peanut"
7. "Devotion and Desire"

== Charts ==
Chart (2006)	Peak position
U.S. Billboard 200	200
