= Gene The Werewolf =

American rock band

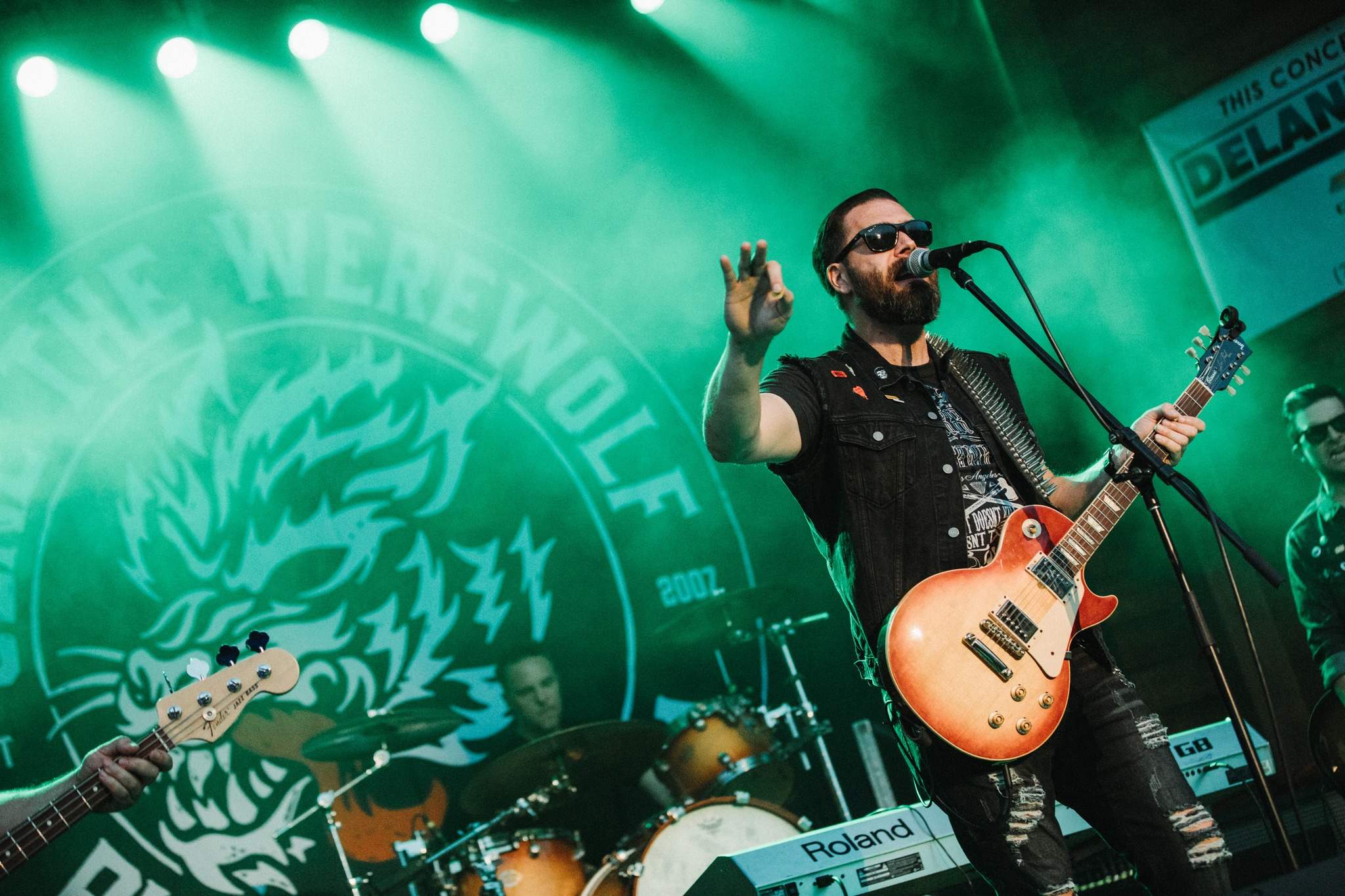
- Gene The Werewolf performing in 2023

Background information
- Origin: Pittsburgh, Pennsylvania, US
- Genres: Rock; Hard rock
- Years active: 2007–present
- Label: Frontiers Music
- Members: Jon Belan; Drew Donegan; Nick Revak; Andrew Marks; Aaron Mediate; Dan Garrighan
- Past members: Chris Serafini; Tim Schultz; Michael Ofca; Britton Sloan

Gene The Werewolf is an American rock band from Pittsburgh, Pennsylvania, United States, that was formed in 2007. The band has released three full-length albums, including the European release Rock n' Roll Animal on Frontiers Music, an EP, and multiple one-off singles.

== History ==
=== Early years and Light Me Up: 2007-2009 ===
Gene The Werewolf was formed in 2007 as a so-called "Supergroup" of Pittsburgh musicians originally consisting of Jon Belan (lead vocals/guitar), Drew Donegan (guitar), Nick Revak (drums), Aaron Mediate (keys) and Tim Schultz (bass).

In 2005, after the demise of The Berlin Project (Orange Peal Records), Belan and Revak decided to team up and write new music that focused more on their Rock n Roll roots.

The band got their name after a friend told Belan he resembled a werewolf due to the length of his hair at the time. At first, Belan thought he heard "Gene" rather than "Jon" and the name "Gene The Werewolf" became an ongoing laugh between the two.

On October 12, 2007, Gene The Werewolf played their first live show as a full band at Club Cafe in the South Side of Pittsburgh.

In January 2009, the band hired Lucas Keller as their manager and signed with Uppercut Management.

On October 20, 2009, Gene The Werewolf released their debut EP "Light Me Up" in the US, with producer Jamie Woolford.

On October 24, 2009, Gene The Werewolf had their "Light Me Up" album release party at Club Diesel in Pittsburgh. It was at this time that the band added Mike Ofca as a lead guitarist and new member. Shortly after, the band parted ways with Uppercut Management.

=== Wicked Love, Frontiers Records and making a name: 2011-2014 ===
On November 23, 2011, Gene The Werewolf released their first full-length album "Wicked Love" in the United States, again with producer Jamie Woolford. The album contained the single "I Only Wanna Rock N' Roll".

On the morning of December 2, 2011, the band performed "I Only Wanna Rock n' Roll" live on The DVE Morning Show to promote their album release show that night at Altar Bar in Pittsburgh. The song was added to the stations main rotation the next day, becoming the most played song on the station in early 2012.

On December 2, 2011, Gene The Werewolf had their "Wicked Love" album release party at The Altar Bar in the Strip District of Pittsburgh.

In 2012, the band signed an international one album record deal with Frontiers Music (Def Leppard, Journey (band)). Later that year, they released their international debut "Rock n' Roll Animal" on the label featuring the single and video for "I Only Wanna Rock n' Roll".

In 2014, the band started writing new music with producer and engineer Sean McDonald (The Clarks, Soul Asylum) for a new upcoming LP.

=== The Loner and member changes: 2016-2018 ===
On June 17, 2016, the bands second full length LP "The Loner" was released. The album featured the title track as the single, with the album release show at Altar Bar, Pittsburgh that same month. The album was produced and engineered by Sean McDonald at Red Medicine Studios and features a guitar solo by Reb Beach of Winger and Whitesnake on the opening track "The Walking Dead"

In late 2016, the band parted ways with lead guitarist Mike Ofca and hired Britton Sloan as his replacement.

In 2017, the band replaced Sloan with Andrew Marks as their permanent lead guitarist and started writing a new single with Sean McDonald to commemorate the bands 10 year anniversary. The song "Keep It Together" was released on January 30, 2018, and was followed up with a music video shot at Red Medicine Studios. The song is an ode to the ups, downs and struggles of keeping a band together after a period of time.

In December 2018, the band parted ways with original bassist Tim Schultz and he was replaced by Chris Serafini, formerly of the Gin Blossoms and Pollen. Serafini's first show with the band was for 105.9 WXDX-FM's "Kick Ass Christmas Show" with The Struts.

=== One off singles/videos ===
On June 20, 2019, the single "Love and Touch" was released and followed up with a music video. The song was written by Belan, Marks and producer Sean McDonald. The video was shot in Pittsburgh by Chris Cichra.

Later that month, the song was added to full rotation on Pittsburgh's WDVE and obtained the #1 spot in late August.

On November 20, 2020 the single "I Should've Known Better" was released and followed up with a music video. The song was written by Belan, Marks and producer Sean McDonald remotely during the COVID-19 pandemic. The video for the song was filmed at the Belle Vernon Athletic Association.

On September 2, 2022 Gene The Werewolf celebrated their 15th anniversary as a band at the South Park Amphitheater (South Park, Pennsylvania), to over 5000 people.

On September 20, 2022 the single "Dying Breed" was released and followed up with a music video. The song was written by Belan, Marks and producer Sean McDonald. The video for the song was filmed in the Spring Garden area of Pittsburgh by Chris Cichra.

In December 2022, the band released a cover of their version of All I Want For Christmas Is You by Mariah Carey as part of "A Very Yinzer Christmas". A homemade music video for the song was released on the bands Youtube channel featuring old footage of Belan opening Christmas presents as a child.

On June 18, 2024 the band released a new single called "Raised By Wolves" and followed it up with a new music video on their YouTube channel. According to the band, "the song is our motivational anthem about finding strength in determination and rising above life’s challenges".

On August 23, 2024 the band released "The Best Of Gene The Werewolf" which is a vinyl only compilation of the bands singles from 2007-2024. The band celebrated the release of the vinyl at the South Park Amphitheater in South Park, PA. Singer Jon Belan spoke of the album by saying “We picked a few selections we thought were best representatives of the band all while keeping the same style as the rest of the songs on the album”. The album is a first time limited pressing on red vinyl.

On June 13, 2025 the band released a live cover version of AC/DC's Highway To Hell on their socials.

In December 2025, the band released their cover of Merry Xmas Everybody by Slade as part of "A Very Yinzer Christmas Vol.2". Singer Jon Belan performed the song live at The Benedum Center for the Performing Arts (formerly the Stanley Theatre) as part of "A Very Yinzer Christmas" on December 8, 2025

In June 2026, the band announced via its official website that bassist Chris Serafini had departed the group and had been replaced by Dan Garrighan. The band did not provide any additional details regarding the lineup change.

On July 7, 2026 the band released a new single called "Never Giving Up" and followed it up with a new music video on their YouTube channel. According to the band, the song is "an anthem for anyone who's ever been counted out but refused to quit".

=== Beer collaboration with Inner Groove Brewing ===
In October 2024, the band announced that they would be collaborating with Inner Groove Brewing in Verona, Pennsylvania to release a limited addition beer under the name of their latest single. "Raised By Wolves" is described as a "Blood Orange IPA (6.5% ABV) hoppy brew, featuring balanced bitterness with sweet blood orange and vibrant citrus notes, was created by the band under the expert guidance of Inner Groove brewmasters Tim Melle and Kevin Walzer." They go on to say that " it will be available in commemorative cans and on draft at Inner Groove Brewing’s Verona and Allentown locations, while supplies last."

Gene The Werewolf's "Raised By Wolves" beer was tapped and released to the public during their "Yinzerween" performance at the Roxian Theater with Donnie Iris on October 26, 2024.

== Members ==
=== Current members ===
- Jon Belan – vocals, guitar (2007–present)
- Nick Revak – drums, (2007–present)
- Drew Donegan – guitar, (2007–present)
- Aaron Mediate – keyboards, (2007–present)
- Andrew Marks - lead guitar, vocals (2017–present)
- Dan Garrighan - bass guitar, vocals (2026–present)

=== Former members ===
- Chris Serafini – bass guitar, vocals (2018-2026)
- Tim Schultz – bass guitar, vocals (2007–2018)
- Mike Ofca - lead guitar (2009-2016)
- Britton Sloan – lead guitar (2016–2017)

== Discography ==
=== Albums ===
Release date	Title	Label
November 23, 2011	Wicked Love	Self-released
November 23, 2012	Rock n' Roll Animal	Frontiers Music
June 17, 2016	The Loner	Self-released
August 23, 2024	The Best Of Gene The Werewolf (Vinyl Album)	Self-released

=== EPs ===
Release date	Title	Label
October 20, 2009	Light Me Up	self-released

=== One-off singles ===
Release date	Title	Label
January 30, 2018	Keep It Together (single)	Self-released
June 20, 2019	Love And Touch (single)	Self-released
November 13, 2020	I Should've Known Better (single)	Self-released
September 20, 2022	Dying Breed (single)	Self-released
June 18, 2024	Raised By Wolves (single)	Self-released
June 13, 2025	Highway To Hell (LIVE COVER)	Self-released
July 7, 2026	Never Giving Up (single)	Self-released
