= The Berlin Project =

American rock band

- Origin: Pittsburgh, Pennsylvania, United States
- Genres: Alternative metal, punk rock, ska punk
- Years active: 1995–2005; 2009
- Label: Orange Peal Records
- Past members: John Garrighan; Brian Camp; Bradley (Brad Evanovich); Nick Revak; Aaron Mediate; Chuck Rocha; Jon Belan
- Website: The Berlin Project at MySpace

The Berlin Project was an American punk rock band from just outside Pittsburgh, Pennsylvania, United States, with influences from the punk and ska music scenes that was active from 1995 to 2005. The band took its name from a computer program.

In those ten years, the band toured North America, sharing the stage with various bands such as the Matches, Steel Train, Punchline, Sloppy Meateaters, The Unsung Zeros, the Juliana Theory, Midtown, River City High, Catch 22 and Clearview Kills. The band played side stages during the 2002 and 2003 Van's Warped Tour. The Berlin Project was also a part of numerous Radio Festivals and the like such as 2000's X-Fest in Pittsburgh with Stone Temple Pilots and Everclear, and 2002's Skate and Surf Festival in Asbury Park, New Jersey, with the Descendents and more.

The Berlin Project released two albums on US indie label Orange Peal records. The band's final album, The Things We Say, was released to some success on Trident Style Recordings in Japan. In 1997, the band covered Snoop Dogg's "Gin and Juice".

In 2007, Belan, Revak and Mediate went on to form rock band Gene The Werewolf.

In August 2009, the band temporarily reformed with John Garrighan, Chuck Rocha, Paul Menotiades (Punchline, the Composure), Cory Muro (the Composure) to perform four concerts in Pennsylvania, Ohio, and Maryland. Some of these shows were headlining dates with support from the Composure and some were in support of also-regrouped the Ataris.

Founding member John Garrighan died of a heroin overdose in January 2011.

The Berlin Project reunited for one performance on July 8, 2017, at Mr. Smalls in Millvale, Pennsylvania, as the main support act for Punchline's 20th Anniversary Show. The band played songs from their entire discography. Returning members included Jon Belan, Bradley (Brad Evanovich), Brian Camp, Nick Revak, Aaron Mediate, Sean McAfee, Bryan Coles, and Michael "Nacho" Crosby. Dan Garrighan filled in for his brother on guitar and vocals.

== Discography ==
=== Studio albums ===
- 1998: Running For the Border
- 1999: Culture Clash
- 2004: The Things We Say

=== EPs ===
- 2000: The Transition Radio EP

== Band members ==
- John Garrighan (lead vocals, lead guitar): 1995–2005, died in 2011.
- Jon Belan (lead vocals, rhythm guitar): 2002–2005
- Nick Revak (drums): 1999–2005
- Aaron Mediate (keyboards, saxophone): 1997–2005
- Tim Schultz (bass, backing vocals): 2003–2005
- Chuck Rocha (bass/vocals) : 2002–2003, 2009
- Bradley (Brad Evanovich) (bass/vocals) : 1995–2002
- Brian Camp (guitar/vocals) : 1995–2002
- Michael "Nacho" Crosby (alto sax/vocals) : 1998–2000
- Sean McAfee (keyboards/trombone) : 1998–2000
- Bryan Coles (trumpet) : 2000
- Joe Rothwell (drums) : 1995–1999
- Nick Boehm (trumpet) : 1995-1999
- Eric Porado (trumpet) : 1997–1999
- Joe Culig (trombone) : 1997–1999

Touring

- Paul Menotiades (guitar/vocals) : 2009
- Cory Muro (drums) : 2009
