= Bayside (band) =

American punk rock band

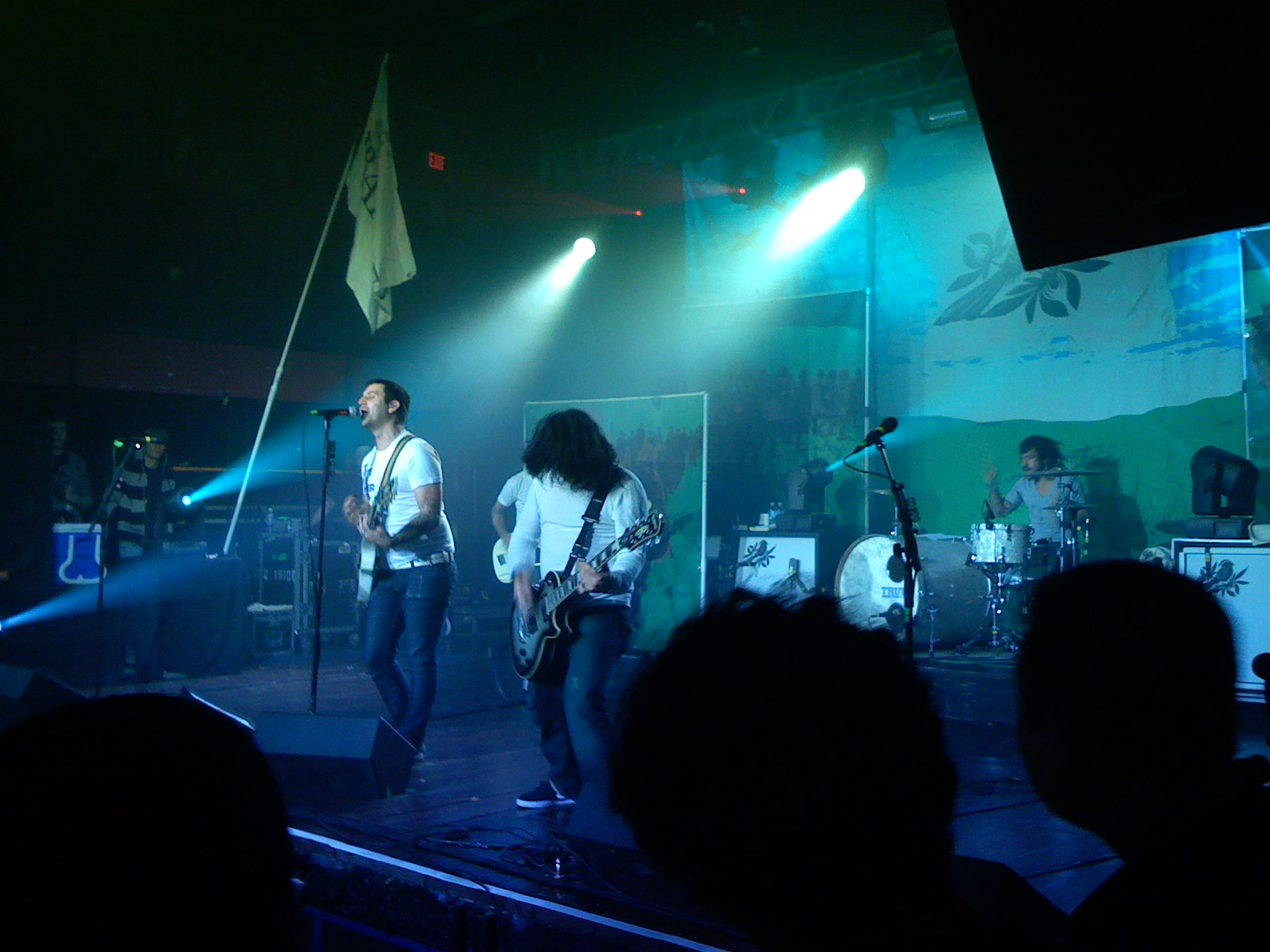
- Bayside performing in 2007

Background information
- Origin: New York City, U.S.
- Genres: Punk rock; emo; hardcore punk; pop-punk
- Years active: 2000–present
- Labels: Dying Wish; Victory; Wind-Up; Hopeless
- Members: Anthony Raneri; Jack O'Shea; Nick Ghanbarian; Chris Guglielmo
- Past members: Andrew Elderbaum; Jim Mitchell; John "Beatz" Holohan; Jason Enz; Mike Kozak; Chris Jackson; Vinny Daraio; Dustin Roth; JR Manning
- Website: baysidebayside.com

Bayside is an American punk rock band from the Bayside, Queens, neighborhood of New York City, formed in 2000 by lead vocalist Anthony Raneri. The group also consists of lead guitarist Jack O'Shea, bassist Nick Ghanbarian, and drummer Chris Guglielmo.

Since their formation, the group has released nine full-length albums, with their debut, Sirens and Condolences, in 2004, and the release of 2005's follow-up, Bayside, launching the band into mainstream success. The band released seven more albums: The Walking Wounded (2007), Shudder (2008), Killing Time (2011), Cult (2014), Vacancy (2016), Interrobang (2019) and There Are Worse Things Than Being Alive (2024).

== History ==
=== Early years and debut album (2000–04) ===
Bayside was formed by Anthony Raneri, Vinny Daraio, Chris Jackson (formerly of the Showoffs and Waste Management), and Mike Kozak in October 2000 in Queens, New York City. The band got its name when on their way to a Drive-Thru Records showcase on Long Island featuring New Found Glory, with the intention of giving New Found Glory a demo CD, and they were trying to think of a name to write on the CD. They passed the Bayside train station, and decided to write "Bayside" on the CD, which stuck. The group self-released a five-song demo and signed to Dying Wish Records to issue their first release, Long Stories Short EP in 2001. In early 2002, the band toured with the likes of My Hotel Year, Don't Look Down, A440, Brand New, and Hot Rod Circuit.

In June 2002, Kozak left the band and was replaced by JR Manning of Caroline. In October 2002, the band supported Shelter for two weeks on their headlining US tour, before spending November and December touring with Unsung Zeros and Junction 18, and two weeks with the Rocking Horse Winner and Twothirtyeight. In March 2003, the band released a split EP with Name Taken through Dying Wish Records. It was promoted with an East Coast US tour with Goodwill and Junction 18 in April and May 2003. Later in 2003, Bayside signed to Victory Records, where the band resided for the next six years. Bayside's debut full-length album, Sirens and Condolences, was released on January 27, 2004, through Victory Records.

=== Self-titled album and Acoustic EP (2004–06) ===
The band's self-titled follow-up album, Bayside, was released on August 23, 2005, by Victory Records. While touring in support of the album, the band was involved in a van accident on October 31, 2005, at 3 AM in Cheyenne, Wyoming. After leaving their Boulder, Colorado show, their vehicle hit a patch of ice, skidded off the road, and flipped over. Drummer John "Beatz" Holohan, age 31, was killed, and bassist Nick Ghanbarian was seriously injured when he was ejected through one of the van's windows. Ghanbarian broke his L-4 lumbar vertebrae, which required surgery, while bandmates Anthony Raneri and Jack O'Shea escaped with minor injuries.

Bayside released Acoustic, a collection of acoustic versions of their songs which featured the song "Winter", a tribute to Holohan. The band Punchline dedicated their album 37 Everywhere to the memory of Holohan. The first song on the record, "Flashlight," features backing vocals from Raneri, and the song "They Are Strong Hands" is a reference to Bayside's song "They Looked Like Strong Hands" from their self-titled album. "They Are Strong Hands" also makes a lyrical shout out to Holohan saying "Ain't nobody gonna bring me down, 'cause my boy John Beatz got my back." Several other bands wrote songs dedicated to his memory, including Aiden, I Am the Avalanche, Silverstein, and The Sleeping.

=== The Walking Wounded and Shudder (2006–09) ===
The band released The Walking Wounded on February 6, 2007, and was re-released as The Walking Wounded: Gold Edition on July 22, 2007, with the newer edition containing bonus live acoustic tracks as well as a bonus DVD, which includes live acoustic recordings, music videos, and documentaries. The drums and percussion on the album were performed by Chris Guglielmo, who joined the band as their new drummer after the death of John Holohan. A remix of the song "Duality" was featured in the soundtrack to Resident Evil: Extinction.

On September 30, 2008, the band released its fourth full-length album, Shudder, and a live album, Live at the Bayside Social Club. The album had been leaked onto various file-sharing sites earlier in the month on September 5, 2008. A week before the official release on September 22, 2008, the album was put up to stream on the band's official MySpace page. On October 4, 2008, the music video for the song "No One Understands" was posted for viewing on the band's official MySpace page.

=== Killing Time (2009–12) ===
On May 2, 2009, the band performed at Bamboozle Festival at Giants Stadium in New Jersey, the band's third stint at the festival. During this time, Bayside finished their contract obligations with Victory Records, and released a cover of "Beautiful Girls" by Sean Kingston for the Fearless Records' cover compilation album Punk Goes Pop 2. The following summer the band finished its fourth stint on the Vans Warped Tour, and much of 2010 the band worked on its fifth album with plans on releasing it in early 2011, which the magazine Alternative Press named one of the most anticipated albums of 2010 in its annual feature.

On March 10, 2010, the Alternative Press website released news that Bayside has signed to the record label Wind-up Records, projecting the band's next release to be fall of the same year. The band began tracking their fifth album and Wind Up Records debut on June 1, 2010, at Dreamland Recording Studios in Hurley, New York. Bayside enlisted the help of prolific British rock producer Gil Norton, who is best known for his work with the Foo Fighters, The Pixies, Counting Crows, Echo and the Bunnymen, Jimmy Eat World and Dashboard Confessional. In September 2010 the band announced through their Twitter account that the new album will be called Killing Time, and will be released on February 22, 2011. On October 5, 2010, the band announced the track listing for Killing Time on their Twitter. The first song, "Already Gone", was put up for streaming exclusively on AbsolutePunk.net on October 18, 2010. Their first single from Killing Time, "Sick, Sick, Sick", was released on November 16, 2010. On February 3, 2011, "Mona Lisa" was released on the Alternative Press website to be streamed for free, although it was played previously at an Acoustic set for 104.5 Radio with "On Love, On Life".

Bayside played the 2011 Take Action Tour with Silverstein co-headlining, with opening acts including Polar Bear Club, The Swellers, and Texas In July. On April 26, 2011, the Take Action Vol. 10 compilation was released, which included a previously unreleased Bayside song, "Battle Scars". Bayside announced that they would be going on tour with Saves The Day, I Am The Avalanche, and Transit from the middle of September 2011 to the middle of November 2011. During the tour, Rise Records released a 7" vinyl compilation featuring one song from each of the bands touring, which was limited to only 2000 copies. The Bayside song featured on the 7" split was the original demo of their new single "Sick, Sick, Sick." After a break from touring, the band announced that they would be doing Warped Tour 2012 from June 16 to July 30, and Raneri would be playing solo acoustic sets on the Acoustic Basement Stage for the same tour dates.

=== Covers Volume #1 (EP) and Cult (2012–15) ===
On September 17, 2012, Bayside announced they were self-releasing a cover EP entitled Covers Volume #1, through their own record label Gumshoe Records, which would be released on October 23, 2012. The EP contained covers of songs from Van Morrison, The Ronettes, Del Shannon, Elvis Costello and Billy Joel. They also announced that they would start writing a new album tentatively in January 2013. In an interview with Alternative Press on September 25, 2012, Raneri stated the intention of making more volumes of cover EPs as the reasoning behind naming this first one Covers Volume #1. Previously, they had announced that they would be going on tour with Taking Back Sunday for their "Tell All Your Friends" 10th Anniversary Tour, which for Bayside started on October 4, 2012, and ended on November 23, 2012, in their hometown of New York City. On August 16, 2013, the band revealed that they had signed to Hopeless Records.

On November 12, 2013, Bayside revealed their sixth album, Cult, after a series of photos on their Instagram page symbolizing their previous albums. In the last picture, all symbols were depicted inside a hexagram with six tally marks at the six points of the star. With the release, Bayside provided pre-orders that included a download of "Pigsty", and a track list of the new album was also released on the band's website. The album was released on February 18, 2014, and the following April the band went on a UK tour with Alkaline Trio in support of the new album. They also featured on the 2014 Warped Tour.

Bayside announced a 15th anniversary tour beginning on March 5, 2015, with Senses Fail, Man Overboard, and Seaway. On June 25, 2015, the band announced a tour to be supported by The Early November and Better Off. The tour ran from August 31, 2015, through to September 18, with the tour concluding with a date at Riot Fest in Toronto, Ontario, Canada.

=== Vacancy and Acoustic Volume 2 (2016–2018) ===
On August 19, 2016, Bayside released their seventh studio album entitled Vacancy through Hopeless Records.

The band embarked on a US tour to support the album through August and September 2016 and announced Australian tour dates for November 2016.

On August 16, 2018, the band announced they would be making another acoustic album, titled Acoustic Volume 2, updated with songs from newer albums. The album includes a new song, "It Don't Exist", and a music video was released for it on the day of the announcement. The album was released on September 28, 2018.

=== Interrobang, and Acoustic Volume 3 (2019–2022) ===
On August 20, the band released a new single, titled "Prayers".

On September 20, the band announced their eighth studio album, Interrobang, and released the title track along with a music video. The album's release date was also set as October 4, only two weeks from this announcement.

A week later, a tour in support of the new album was announced along with a battle of the bands submission and voting based on the band's website. The Contest was meant as a way for the band to support local unsigned bands and give them a chance to perform in front of a large crowd. Each concert would feature a local band as an opener.

In 2020, the band announced a 20th anniversary tour with Senses Fail, Hawthorne Heights, and Can't Swim, but it was cancelled due to the COVID-19 pandemic.

The band later released another acoustic album, Acoustic Volume 3, on December 11, 2020.

This was followed by the release of the single "Rainbow" on June 28, 2022.

=== The Red EP, The Blue EP, and There Are Worse Things Than Being Alive (2022–2024) ===
In May 2022, the band announced that they would be releasing an EP later in the year. With this announcement came the EP's first single, "Strangest Faces". On August 11, the second single, "Good Advice", was released, and on October 19, The Red EP was fully released via Hopeless Records.

The band then released The Blue EP on March 17, 2023, also via Hopeless Records.

After over a year without a release, Bayside released a new single, "Castaway," on January 25, 2024, simultaneously announcing an upcoming North American tour.

On February 22, the band announced their ninth studio album, There Are Worse Things Than Being Alive, set for release on April 5, alongside a physical release on May 10 through Hopeless Records.

Shortly after, the single "The Devils" was released on February 24, 2024. This was followed up by the announcement of the band's new single, "Miracle" on March 13. The single began streaming the next day on March 14, 2024, via Hopeless Records. The band would then begin streaming There Are Worse Things Than Being Alive on April 5, 2024, via Hopeless Records. The album featured all songs present in The Blue EP, alongside songs new to the release.

=== Aside, Devotion and Desire, 2026 EPs, and Best Christmas Yet (2024-2026) ===
On July 19, 2024, Bayside released a cover of "Aside", originally by Canadian indie rock band The Weakerthans.

On March 28, 2025, Bayside released a re-recorded version of their song "Devotion And Desire" from their 2005 self-titled album.

On June 26, 2026, Bayside released a new EP "Anywhere But Here", which featured four existing songs and a previously unreleased track "Monster" from their 2011 album "Killing Time". Notably, the EP was released via Fearless Records, as opposed to their usual partner, Hopeless Records.

On July 24, 2026, Bayside released another EP "Proxima Centauri B", which featured a "Killing Time" B-side track "Battle Scars", along with four existing songs.

On August 21, 2026, Bayside released a third EP "Bark At The Moon", which featured the "Killing Time" B-side track "Don't Come Easy", along with four previously released songs.

On November 4, 2026 Bayside released a seasonal EP titled "Best Christmas Yet & Jingle Bells," featuring the two songs of the title. "Best Christmas Yet" is an original song depicting the singer as a hopeful host for festivities, eager to make them the best they have experience. "Jingle Bells" is a rock cover of the popular Christmas song of the same name. This EP was published as a Concord Label Group Release.

== Other projects ==
=== Anthony Raneri's solo project ===
Frontman Anthony Raneri, through his personal blog, Twitter account and various interviews, hinted at a solo release. At midnight on December 4, 2009, Raneri released a demo version of the solo song "The Ballad of Bill the Saint" on his personal Myspace page, the first recorded song from a reported upcoming solo album. The song was recorded in one night at Chris Kirkpatrick's studio in his own home, after the two met at one of Raneri's solo shows in Orlando, Florida. On January 22, 2011, in an interview with Alternative Press, Raneri stated that he has no plans to release a solo album any time soon. However, as recently as August 20, 2011, Raneri stated at a solo show he was playing in Rhode Island, "I was thinking about maybe putting out a solo record next year," and also mentioned that he had not revealed to his record label of his intentions about putting out a solo album yet, but joked that they would know of his intentions after he would post a video of the show on the internet. Raneri began recording his solo EP on December 13 in Los Angeles. Steve Choi from Rx Bandits, Davey Warsop from Beat Union, and Jarrod Alexander of My Chemical Romance were announced as his backing band and collaborators on the recording. On December 20, 2011, it was announced via Facebook that the solo EP was named New Cathedrals and was scheduled for an early 2012 release. On December 31, Raneri posted to his Facebook page that the EP would be released before the start of the "Where's the Band? Tour" in January.

On January 10, 2012, the first song from the EP, "Sandra Partial", was released for free streaming on Alternative Press. Also, via his Facebook page, Raneri released the artwork and track list of the EP. On January 16, another song from the EP, entitled "Please Don't Leave", was released on AbsolutePunk. That same day the full EP was released on iTunes, and within hours made it to number seven on the iTunes Store Top 10 Alternative Albums chart. On June 30, 2015, Raneri's second EP was released on Hopeless Records. The title of the EP is "Sorry State of Mind" and its first single is titled "Gone". The EP was recorded at his longtime friend Steve Soboslai's, the guitarist from the band Punchline, studio on Nashville's Music Row.

Anthony announced a new solo EP, Everyday Royalty on August 22, 2024, to be released on November 15, 2024. The first single, Bones featuring Sam Tinnesz is an example of the Alt-Country vibe of the record. "The seven tracks on the record seamlessly string together anthemic alt-rock, soul-searching indie-folk and full-tilt country."

=== Chris Guglielmo's solo project ===
In 2024, drummer Chris Guglielmo launched his own solo project under the name Headtrip. His first EP No Love featured three new original songs, released on January 5, 2024. The EP was followed the next week by the single "Black Tongues".

== Members ==
=== Current members ===
- Anthony Raneri – lead vocals, rhythm guitar (2000–present), lead guitar (2002–2003)
- Jack O'Shea – lead guitar, backing vocals (2003–present)
- Nick Ghanbarian – bass, backing vocals (2004–present)
- Chris Guglielmo – drums, percussion (2006–present)

=== Former members ===
- Mike Kozak – lead guitar, backing vocals (2000–2002)
- Chris Jackson – bass (2000–2001)
- Vinny Daraio – drums, percussion (2000–2001)
- Dustin Roth - drums, percussion (2001)
- Andrew Elderbaum – bass, backing vocals (2001–2004)
- Jason Enz – drums, percussion (2001–2003)
- JR Manning – lead guitar (2002)
- Jim Mitchell – drums, percussion (2003–2004)
- John "Beatz" Holohan – drums, percussion (2004–2005; his death)

=== Line-ups ===
Period	Members	Releases
October 2000	Anthony Raneri – lead vocals, guitar; Chris Jackson – bass; Mike Kozak – guitar, vocals; Vinny Daraio – drums	Bayside Demo; Long Stories Short
July 2001	Anthony Raneri – lead vocals, guitar; Andrew Elderbaum – bass; Mike Kozak – guitar, vocals; Vinny Daraio – drums	none
September 2001	Anthony Raneri – lead vocals, guitar; Andrew Elderbaum – bass; Mike Kozak – guitar, vocals; Dustin Roth – drums	none
December 2001	Anthony Raneri – lead vocals, guitar; Andrew Elderbaum – bass; Mike Kozak – guitar, vocals; Jason Enz – drums, vocals	none
May 2002	Anthony Raneri – lead vocals, guitar; Andrew Elderbaum – bass; JR Manning – guitar; Jason Enz – drums, vocals	New Demo - 2002
Fall 2002	Anthony Raneri – lead vocals, guitar; Andrew Elderbaum – bass; Jason Enz – drums	Bayside/Name Taken
Spring 2003	Anthony Raneri – lead vocals, guitar; Andrew Elderbaum – bass; Jack O'Shea – guitar, vocals; Jim Mitchell – drums	Sirens and Condolences
Spring 2005	Anthony Raneri – lead vocals, guitar; Nick Ghanbarian – bass, vocals; Jack O'Shea – guitar, vocals; John "Beatz" Holohan – drums	Bayside
December 2005	Anthony Raneri – lead vocals, guitar; Nick Ghanbarian – bass; Jack O'Shea – guitar, vocals	Acoustic
February 2006	Anthony Raneri – lead vocals, guitar; Nick Ghanbarian – bass, vocals; Jack O'Shea – guitar, vocals; Chris Guglielmo – drums	All releases from The Walking Wounded onward

== Discography ==
Studio albums

- Sirens and Condolences (2004)
- Bayside (2005)
- The Walking Wounded (2007)
- Shudder (2008)
- Killing Time (2011)
- Cult (2014)
- Vacancy (2016)
- Interrobang (2019)
- There Are Worse Things Than Being Alive (2024)
