= Interrobang (Bayside album) =

Studio album by Bayside
- Released: October 4, 2019
- Genre: Post-hardcore; emo; alternative metal; alternative rock; pop punk; indie rock
- Length: 36:12
- Label: Hopeless
- Producer: Cameron Webb

Bayside chronology
Vacancy (2016)	Interrobang (2019)	There Are Worse Things Than Being Alive (2024)

Interrobang is the eighth studio album by American rock band Bayside.

== Background ==
In September 2018, the group released Acoustic Volume 2, which featured acoustic re-workings of their back catalogue. It was promoted with a two-leg US tour: first leg in November and December, with the second in January and February 2019.

== Release ==
On August 20, 2019, the band released the single "Prayers". On September 20, Interrobang was announced for release the following month. Alongside this, a music video was released for the title-track, directed by Megan Thompson. The group held a battle-of-the-bands contest where people could vote for locals acts to open for the band on their headlining tour later in the year. On September 27, "Bury Me" was made available for streaming. Interrobang was released on October 4 through Hopeless Records. In November and December, the group embarked on a headlining US tour. "Heaven" was released on 7" vinyl as a Record Store Day 2020 release.

== Reception ==
Professional ratings
Review scores
Source	Rating
Alternative Press	Favorable

The album received favorable reviews from critics.

== Track listing ==
No.	Title	Length
1.	"Interrobang"	4:24
2.	"Prayers"	3:30
3.	"Bury Me"	3:43
4.	"Tall"	3:36
5.	"Medication"	3:05
6.	"Numb"	3:43
7.	"Heaven"	3:47
8.	"Trouble"	3:09
9.	"Walk It Off"	3:48
10.	"White Flag"	3:27
Total length:		36:12
