= The Sleeping =

American post-hardcore band

- Origin: Long Island, New York, U.S.
- Genre: Post-hardcore
- Years active: 2003–2012, 2016, 2022–present
- Labels: Victory, One Day Savior
- Spinoffs: Night Verses
- Spinoff of: Skycamefalling
- Members: Douglas Robinson; Cameron Keym; Salvatore Mignano; Joseph Zizzo
- Past members: Paul Cadena; Christopher Evans
- Website: thesleeping.net

The Sleeping is an American post-hardcore band from Long Island, New York, United States, initially active from 2003 to 2012 before announcing their permanent reunion in 2023. They are known for their emotive lyrics, unpredictable sound, and dynamic live shows. Their music has been featured in video games including Tony Hawk's Downhill Jam for the Wii, Madden NFL 07, Guitar Hero III: Legends of Rock ("Don't Hold Back"), Guitar Hero: World Tour ("Bomb the World"), and FlatOut: Ultimate Carnage ("Listen Close"). They released their fourth studio album, The Big Deep, on September 28, 2010. The band announced their permanent reunion and a new album during a performance at Saint Vitus on February 18, 2023.

== Formation and initial run (2003–2012) ==
Following the break up of their previous band- influential hardcore group Skycamefalling Cameron Keym, Sal Mignano, and Joe Zizzo formed The Sleeping, naming the band after a website created by Keym's brother Andrew. After auditioning twenty-two potential singers, they came across Doug Robinson, former singer, and guitarist of the band Stillwelle. The band immediately started touring off a four-song demo that was hand-printed and self-recorded. The demo sold over 1000 copies and included the songs Through Airwaves, Until The Night, and early versions of Sunday Matinee (Reel to Real) and One Flight One Flame.

In 2004, The Sleeping was signed to One Day Savior Recordings- a small independent record company run by Chris Tzompanakis- Keym, Mignano, and Zizzos former bandmate in Skycamefalling- and released their first record, Believe What We Tell You, which was produced, recorded, and mixed by Michael Birnbaum & Chris Bittner at Applehead Recording in Woodstock, NY.

In 2004 and 2005, they toured with Taking Back Sunday, Bayside, Brandston, Action Action and many more. After signing with Victory Records, the band released their second album titled Questions and Answers, which was also produced, recorded, and mixed by Michael Birnbaum & Chris Bittner. The album included the songs "Loud & Clear" and "Don't Hold Back," serving as the band's first two professionally filmed music videos. The album also included the song “The Big Breakdown Day 3 (The Escape), a continuation of two tracks from their debut album and partly named in tribute to their defunct tour companions, The Escape Engine. That same year they were featured on the Nintendo Fusion Tour along with Plain White T's, Relient K, Emery, and Hawthorne Heights. They also toured the UK on the Victory Records Tour with labelmatesThe Audition, Bayside, and Aiden. In 2006, the band made their national TV debut on Cartoon Network’s programming block Fridays performing their song Heart Beatz. They toured mainland Europe and the UK on the Give It A Name fest with Gallows, Jimmy Eat World, and Sparta. They toured in January 2007 with Senses Fail, among others. They were also nominated for 2007's MTV Mountain Dew Circuit Breakout and finished in the Top 12.

In 2008, the band announced that founding guitarist Cameron Keym would be stepping down with Paul Cadena replacing him and Christopher Evans being added as a keyboardist.

The band proceeded to tour across the East Coast and Midwest U.S. with Envy on the Coast, Secret Lives of the Freemasons, and also a few concerts with The Gay Blades, finishing in late August. On October 15, they played at Eisenhower Park with Crosby, Stills & Nash along with Ryan Star, Francis Dunnery, Barefoot Truth, Jaik Miller Band, Katy Pfaffl, Melissa Reyes, Life, Arlon Bennett, and others in support of Barack Obama.

On November 7, 2008, the band announced that they were recording a new record via their MySpace page at Salad Days Studio in Baltimore. The following year, they toured with Funeral for a Friend, Emarosa, and This Is Hell for a U.S. tour from January to February 2009. On January 6, 2009, the tracklist for What It Takes was added to their MySpace page. On February 17, 2009, What It Takes was released and peaked at No. 20 on the Top Heatseekers chart, garnering positive reviews. In April, the band played shows in Ontario with Bring Me the Horizon.

They also announced tour dates with Silverstein, Poison the Well, Oceana, Hollywood Undead, The Red Jumpsuit Apparatus, Escape the Fate, Atreyu, Mest, and Madina Lake. They have also played at the Quebec City Summer Festival with Sting, The Yeah Yeah Yeahs, Hollywood Undead, and The Red Jumpsuit Apparatus. On September 13–16, 2009, they played four sold-out shows in a row at Broadway in Amityville, New York. They made a video, Directed by "The Chain Gang" (Erick Sasso and Brian Wendelken), for the song "You'll Be A Corpse Before Your Time" with the footage. Bass player Sal Mignano has toured with 'hippy-hop' artist Mod Sun. Drummer Joe Zizzo has performed live with Envy on the Coast.

The band released their 4th and last album in 13 years, The Big Deep, in 2010.

== Break-up, reunion, and new album (2013–present) ==
On January 5, 2012, the band announced their break-up to explore other opportunities.

Following the bands disbanding, it was announced that Douglas Robinson had joined forces with Fullterton-based band Archives, before eventually changing their name to Night Verses, which Robinson would go on to perform on 3 of the band's releases before parting ways in 2017.

The band played what they billed as a one-off reunion/final show at The Paramount in Huntington, NY featuring all members of the band's history with Reggie and the Full Effect, Folly, and Lux Courageous as the supporting acts. Regarding a permanent reunion- Doug spoke about the potential of future shows by saying, "We aren't here planning The Sleeping's future. We are simply in the moment, and the moment is telling us to just play the hell out of this one show."

Following seven years of inactivity, the band announced a pair of reunion shows at Saint Vitus in Brooklyn, NY, and Amityville Music Hall in Amityville, NY, on February 17, 2023, and February 19, 2023, respectively. At the Saint Vitus show, the band announced that they had reunited permanently with the original lineup and have recorded a new album with a new song titled “Tainted,” according to the show's setlist, debuting during the performance. During the second reunion show at Amityville Music Hall, Keym mentioned the band would not be releasing the album through a record label and the album would be crowdfunded, with more details coming.

On March 21, 2023, The Sleeping launched a Kickstarter campaign to fund their new album, “I Feel Like I'm Becoming a Ghost,” with an expected release date of July 28, 2023, and a pledge to deliver a digital version of the album to all backers two weeks early on July 14, 2023. After only 24 hours, the band raised over half of their $30,000 goal. With the help of over 500 backers, the campaign was fully funded on March 31, 2023. In celebration, the band released a new song from the album exclusive to Kickstarter backers titled, “OCD” on April 7, 2023. The album officially released on Spotify, Apple Music and other digital streaming services on August 18, 2023.

== Band members ==
- Douglas Robinson – vocals (2003–2012, 2016, 2022–present)
- Cameron Keym – guitar, keyboard (2003–2008, 2016, 2022–present)
- Salvatore Mignano – bass (2003–2012, 2016, 2022–present)
- Joseph Zizzo – drums (2003–2012, 2016, 2022–present)

=== Past members ===
- Paul Cadena – guitar (2008–2012, 2016)
- Christopher Evans – keyboard/theremin (2008–2012, 2016)

== Discography ==
- Believe What We Tell You (2004, re-issue in 2007)
- Questions and Answers (2006)
- Connect Sets: The Sleeping – EP (2007)
- What It Takes (2009)
- The Big Deep (2010)
- I Feel Like I'm Becoming a Ghost (2023)

== Videography ==
- Believe What We Tell You
- Loud and Clear
- Don't Hold Back
- Bomb the World
- You'll Be a Corpse Before Your Time
- Young Vibes... Don't Run Away From Me
- The Animal
- Tainted
- No Light
