= Anthony Raneri =

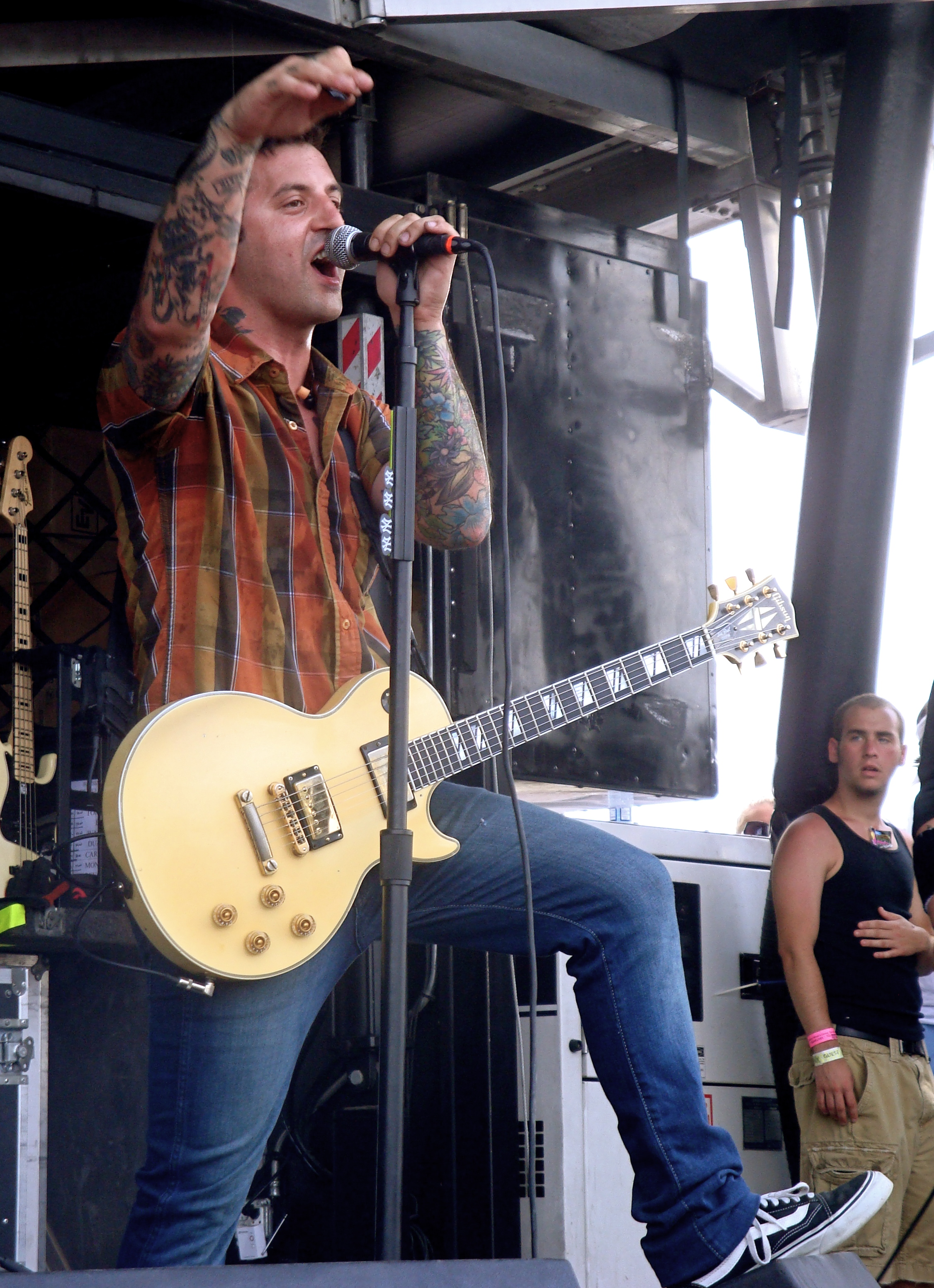
- Anthony Raneri performing

Background information
- Born: August 9, 1982 (age 44); Bayside, Queens, United States
- Occupations: Singer; songwriter; musician
- Member of: Bayside

Anthony Raneri (born August 9, 1982) is an American singer, guitarist, and songwriter, who is the founder, lead vocalist, and rhythm guitarist of the American punk rock band, Bayside.

== Early life ==
Raneri grew up in Glen Oaks Village in Glen Oaks, Queens, New York, for which the band takes its name. He founded Bayside while still attending Benjamin N. Cardozo High School in the late 1990s.

== Solo career ==
By way of his blog, Twitter account and various interviews, there has also been talk of a solo release from frontman Anthony Raneri. On December 4, 2009, at 12:00 am he released a demo version of "The Ballad of Bill the Saint" on his personal Myspace page, the first recorded song from his upcoming solo album. According to Raneri, the song was recorded one night in Chris Kirkpatrick's studio in his own home, after the two met at one of Raneri's solo shows in Orlando, Florida. On January 22, 2011 in an interview with Alternative Press, Raneri stated that he has no plans to release a solo album any time soon, as he only does his solo work for fun. However, as recently as August 20, 2011, Raneri stated at a solo show he was playing in Rhode Island, "I was thinking about maybe putting out a solo record next year," and also went on to say that he had not revealed to his record label of his intentions about putting out a solo album yet, but joked that they would know of his intentions after he would post a video of the show on the internet.

Raneri began recording his solo EP on December 13 in Los Angeles, CA. Steve Choi from RxBandits, Davey Warsop from Beat Union and Jarrod Alexander of My Chemical Romance were announced as his backing band and collaborators on the recording. On December 20, 2011, it was announced via Facebook that the solo EP was named New Cathedrals and was scheduled for an early 2012 release. On December 31, Raneri posted to his Facebook page that the EP would be released before the start of the "Where's the Band? Tour" in January.

On January 10, 2012, the first song from the EP, "Sandra Partial", was released for free streaming on Alternative Press. Also, via his Facebook page, Raneri released the artwork and track list of the EP. On January 16, another song from the EP, entitled "Please Don't Leave", was released on AbsolutePunk. That same day the full EP was released on iTunes, and within hours made it to number seven on the iTunes Store Top 10 Alternative Albums chart.

On June 30, 2015, Raneri put out his second solo EP titled Sorry State of Mind. The album was released through Hopeless Records.

On August 23, 2024, Raneri signed with Equal Vision Records, who released his third EP, Everyday Royalty, on November 15 of the same year.

== Personal life ==
Raneri married his first wife on February 3, 2007; they later divorced. In October 2013, he and his second wife, Mia Graffam, welcomed a child. In late 2015, upon returning to the United States from Bayside's European Tour, Raneri and Graffam divorced, whereby each would retain some custody of their daughter. While he was going through this process he lived in a motel in Franklin, Tennessee, unable to return to his native New York, due to his daughter's proximity to the Nashville area, he was essentially stuck in Franklin. Lyrics for Bayside's seventh album were mostly penned by Raneri while he lived alone in a motel. The album would later get the name Vacancy with the front cover showing a picture of the motel Raneri stayed in. He has since married a third time. The couple welcomed a daughter in January 2024.
