= Arco Iris (Skybox album) =

Studio album by Skybox
- Released: 2006
- Genre: Pop
- Length: 47:23
- Label: Skybox Music

Arco Iris is the name of the 2006 debut album of the American indie pop band, Skybox. It was recorded by Jamie Woolford (The Stereo, Let Go) and mastered by Jason Livermore (The Ataris, Rise Against, MxPx).

== Track listing ==
1. The Caravan Cabaret - 2:55
2. Disco Duck - 1:26
3. Silly Things That People Say - 2:14
4. Superglued to My Spaceship - 2:28
5. Various Kitchen Utensils - 2:46
6. Infinity & Blue Skies - 3:35
7. It's a Bumpy Ride on the Back of a Camel - 3:56
8. The Lass, the Bitch & the Butcher - 2:10
9. Cue Conversation - 3:49
10. Bee Mee - 3:40
11. Gravity Can't Keep Us Down (Unless We're on Earth) - 6:51
12. The Devil's Road - 4:22
13. Werewolf - 3:05
14. Don't Get Spin Spin - 4:06
