= The Story Changes =

American rock band

- Origin: Dayton, Ohio, U.S.
- Genres: Punk rock, indie rock
- Years active: 2004–present
- Labels: Future Destination Records, I Am Shark, Little Heart Records
- Members: Mark McMillon – vocals, guitar Chris "Poppy" Popadak – drums
- Website: Official website

The Story Changes is an American two-piece punk/indie rock band based out of Dayton, Ohio. It is composed of Mark McMillon and Chris “Poppy” Popadak of the multi-platinum selling band Hawthorne Heights.

== History ==
=== Beginning ===
The Story Changes was formed in 2004, and is the vision of vocalist and guitarist Mark McMillon. Through most of the 1990s and into the new millennium, the Dayton, Ohio-based McMillon was the sole constant member of a long-running act called Rod who toured with the likes of Hey Mercedes, The Stereo, Motion City Soundtrack, and more. When that band's final lineup split up not long after the release of their final album, The Story Changes Everyday, McMillon retired the name and chose to regroup under an amended version of the album's title.

=== Last Night a Rock Band Saved My Life and The Way of the Dinosaur ===
Following the recording of the band's debut album, Last Night a Rock Band Saved My Life, which was released on June 3, 2005, on the band never looked back and toured constantly including a well-received stint on the 2006 Vans Warped Tour. On their second full-length album, The Way of the Dinosaur, The Story Changes deliver an emotionally charged and energetic effort molding modern influences like Jimmy Eat World with past loves Jawbreaker, Seaweed, and Quicksand, among others. Produced by Jamie Woolford (The Stereo, Let Go, Punchline), the album captures the energy of the band's live show while still bringing the song's strong melodies to the forefront. After spending the better part of two years on the road supporting their debut album Last Night a Rock Band Saved My Life, the band cites life on the road as not only an influence lyrically, but also in the overall tone and direction of the new album. Singer/guitarist Mark McMillon notes: "During the touring for the last album, we noticed that we always tend to play the more aggressive songs live and the more straight forward pop songs from our last album weren't making their way into the set. When we started putting together songs for Dinosaur, we decided that we wanted a slightly heavier record that was primarily based on how we sound live"

=== This Is Your Moment and Hawthorne Heights ===
After the release of The Story Changes first vinyl release of This Is Your Moment EP 7", long time touring partners and hometown friends Hawthorne Heights asked Mark McMillon to join the band as just auxiliary guitarist for their live shows and touring schedule. A few years later in 2013 during the release of Hawthorne Heights’ fifth studio album, Zero, it was made public to the press that Mark had become a full-time member and part of the band.

=== Static and Trembling ===
On May 21, 2013, The Story Changes release the band's third album, Static And Trembling. The new album revisits 'A Better Time In Music' which sounds more like the greats of the 90's than anything released in the previous ten years. The band find themselves echoing the sounds and songwriting skills of pinnacle 90's artists like Smashing Pumpkins, Nirvana, Shiner, and more, while still maintaining a sense of their own identity. Mark McMillon, the vocalist/guitarist of the two-piece, reminisces on the inception of the record; "From the earliest conversations going into the record between myself and my bandmate Chris, or "Poppy" as most of us call him, we knew we wanted the overall feel of the album to be a nod to the late-'90s alternative and punk scene that influenced us growing up." Even the production on Static & Trembling at times seems to pay tribute to alternative music's purer past, with tones that evoke the quintessential recordings of J. Robbins and Steve Albini.

The 14 track album was produced and engineered by Micah Carli (of Hawthorne Heights) at Popside Studios in Troy, Ohio, mixed and additional production by Jamie Woolford (The Stereo, Punchline, Gin Blossoms), and mastered by Dan Coutant (Hostage Calm, Lemuria, Into It. Over It.) which built a comfortable setting to amplify the band's already superlative sound. "I have been playing guitar in Hawthorne Heights with Micah live for around three years, and I knew we worked well together," McMillon explains. "Micah really pushed us to try some new things on this record that I think we were a little too scared to try on our own. Sometimes after being a band for so long, you feel almost stuck on how you are supposed to sound and what feels natural within the sound of your band. I think the end result was honest and pure."

=== 2014–present ===
As of the Hope Revolution Tour 2014 with Hawthorne Heights and The Red Jumpsuit Apparatus, long-time drummer of The Story Changes, Chris “Poppy” Popadak also began playing with Hawthorne Heights as a touring drummer alongside his duties as the band's tour manager.

In 2019, they released a new LP, To Hell With This Delicate Equation, on April 26, during which time they added Chris Serafini of The Stereo to their lineup.

== Discography ==
=== Studio albums ===
- 2005: Last Night A Rock Band Saved My Life (Future Destination Records)
- 2007: The Way Of The Dinosaur (Future Destination Records)
- 2013: Static And Trembling (I Am Shark)
- 2019: To Hell With this Delicate Equation (Magnaphone Records)

=== EPs, Splits, and Compilations ===
- 2003: Split EP w/ The Change (Confined Records)
- 2006: Dead To Me (Future Destination Records)
- 2009: Analogies (Future Destination Records)
- 2011: This Is Your Moment EP (I Am Shark)
- 2014: Never In Daydream (Little Heart Records)
