= Skybox (band) =

American pop rock band

- Origin: Tempe, Arizona, USA
- Genres: Indie pop
- Years active: 2005–2012
- Members: Tim Ellis; Christian Fields
- Past members: Sean Brennan; Mike Holtz; Dan Ingenthron; Rick Roberts; Jeff Gonzales; Anthony Hornyak; Johnny Kenepaske; Sam Meyers

Skybox is an American indie pop quintet that formed in Tempe, Arizona in 2005.

After singer Tim Ellis moved from Missouri to Tempe with bassist Johnny Kenepaske, they soon formed a trio with drummer Aurelio Damiani. Finally, pianist-lead guitarist and vocalist Christian Fields, and keyboardist-percussionist Anthony Hornyak joined. Their musical influences include 1960s psychedelic rock, 1970s classic rock and 1980s new wave music.

Bassist-vocalist Jeff Gonzales replaced Kenepaske, and the band relocated to Chicago. They released their 14-track debut album Arco Iris in 2006, which was recorded by Jamie Woolford (The Stereo, Let Go) and mastered by Jason Livermore (The Ataris, Rise Against, MxPx).

The band was praised by Billboard magazine, among others. The band's song "Light" was later featured in a Target commercial.

Gonzales was later replaced by Rick Roberts. In 2008, that lineup disbanded until several weeks later Ellis and Fields reconnected to work on new material. Mike Holtz and Dan Ingenthron were recruited to develop and later record those songs with some contributions from bassist Matt Schuessler. The band's second studio album, produced by Sean O'Keefe (Fall Out Boy, Motion City Soundtrack, The Plain White T's) titled Morning After Cuts was released in January 2010. The band parted ways with Ingenthron who was later replaced by Sean Brennan.

As of 2012, the band has separated. Tim Ellis is currently working under the label Outsides. Fields and Damiani are producing music with the band wellthen. Fields also plays drums for The Work Basement, as well as his own project, A Lesser Culture. In 2013, Gonzales released his solo debut. Mike Holtz plays with several bands all over Chicago including Clip Art and Leadfoot Band. Dan Ingenthron also plays all over Chicago with several projects playing bass, guitar and keys. Sean Brennan has since located from Arizona to LA and has continued to be active with Yellow Minute and Party Gardens. Johnny Kenepaske has been heavily involved with Adam Lee, adding his talents as The Dead Horse Sound Company playing guitar, providing background vocals and producing. The Dead Horse Sound Company doubles as the name of his recording company based in Kansas City, Missouri.

== Discography ==
- We have come for your Women (~2004)
- Arco Iris (2006)
- Sounds From the Basement: Vol 1 (Compilation) (2008)
- Morning After Cuts (2010)
