= Homewrecker (TV series) =

American reality television series

- Genre: Reality
- Created by: David Osper
- Written by: Kevin Perry; Gary Rosen; Dave Brackenhoff; Joel Knoernschild
- Presented by: Ryan Dunn
- Opening theme: "Aboard the Leper Colony" by Kane Hodder
- Country of origin: United States
- Original language: English
- No. of seasons: 1
- No. of episodes: 8

Production
- Executive producers: Jennifer Heftler; David Osper
- Producers: Cat Rodriguez; Jennifer Ryan; Brian Wahlund
- Cinematography: Douglas Cheney; Adam Biggs; Clark Hoffman
- Editors: Ross Guiduci; Tysun McMullan; Janu Goldschmidt; Rick Kent; Jim Rhoads; Ernesto de la O Hudie Ayalon
- Camera setup: Multi-camera
- Running time: 21–24 minutes

Original release
- Network: MTV
- Release: October 30 – December 18, 2005

Homewrecker is an American reality show on MTV that was hosted by Jackass star Ryan Dunn. The show is a twist on home renovation reality shows such as Trading Spaces and Extreme Makeover: Home Edition; but instead of the room being renovated, it is wrecked.

== Plot ==
To qualify for Homewrecker, a participant had to submit to the show a story of how he or she was victimized by one of their friends. Each segment opened with the "victim" explaining to Ryan Dunn what happened to them. Dunn then observed the offender to get additional ideas on what to do. Finally, Dunn and a team of helpers helped the participant redo their friend's room to fit what the evildoer had done.

The show had two segments, where two separate people get revenge on friends who had recently offended them by trashing their bedrooms. There were short clips in between scenes where the late host Dunn taught the viewer how to perform similar pranks at home. The clips were shot in the style of 1950s training videos.

== Episodes ==
No.	Title	Original release date
1	"Episode 1"	October 30, 2005
In the first episode, Dunn comes to the aid of a man whose friend sent him to a fake gig. He later comes to the aide of a girl whose housemate embarrassed her by making her come out of her room half naked.
2	"Episode 2"	November 6, 2005
Dunn must come to the aid of band member whose buddy ruined his whole night. He later comes to the aid of man whose roommate drew a penis on the side of his face.
3	"Episode 3"	November 13, 2005
Dunn must come to the aid of a man whose female friend pranked him with a fake parking ticket violation. He later comes to the aid of a man whose friend shaved his pubic hair after he passed out.
4	"Episode 4"	November 20, 2005
Dunn must come to the aid of a college student whose buddy saran wrapped his car. He later comes to the aid of a man whose buddy pranked him by replacing his luggage from his business trip with a luggage filled adult sex toys.
5	"Episode 5"	November 27, 2005
Dunn comes to the aid of a guy whose female friend pranked him by messing up his car. He later comes to the aid of a man whose friend tricked him to come to a senior citizen's party to get a ride home.
6	"Episode 6"	December 4, 2005
Dunn comes to the aid of a man whose friend superglued chicken feathers all over him. He later comes to the aid of a man whose buddy waxed off all of his body hair.
7	"Episode 7"	December 11, 2005
Dunn comes to the aid of a roommate whose buddy ruined his chances with a girl he liked by sneaking a fish in a cup. He later helps a man's roommate after being given a weak story.
8	"Episode 8"	December 18, 2005
Dunn comes to the aid of a man whose buddy turned him into a human salad bar. He later comes to the aid of a man whose buddy superglued his fingers to his own body.
