= Who Are You Now? =

Who Are You Now? may refer to:

- Who Are You Now? (The Walking Dead), an episode of the television series The Walking Dead
- Who Are You Now? (album), a 2009 album by This Providence
- Who Are You Now?, a song by Olivia Newton-John, from the album Come On Over
- Who Are You Now?, a song from the musical Funny Girl
- Who Are You Now (album), a 2019 album by Madison Cunningham
