= Under Wraps =

Under Wraps may refer to:

- Under Wraps (Shaun Cassidy album), 1978
- Under Wraps (Jethro Tull album), 1984
- Under Wraps (1997 film), a Disney Channel Original Movie
- Under Wraps (2021 film), a Disney Channel Original Movie, a remake of the 1997 film
- "Under Wraps" (Ben 10 episode), an episode of Ben 10
- "Under Wraps", 2018 song by Her's
- "Under Wraps", 2014 song by Ghost Town from the album The After Party
