= A Wolf in Sheep's Clothing =

Wolf in sheep's clothing is an idiom of biblical origin often wrongly attributed to Aesop.

A Wolf in Sheep's Clothing may also refer to:

== Music ==
=== Albums ===
- A Wolf in Sheep's Clothing (Black Sheep album), 1991
- A Wolf in Sheep's Clothing (Josephine Foster album), 2005

=== Songs ===
- "A Wolf in Sheep's Clothing" (song), 2006, by This Providence
- "Wolf in Sheep's Clothing", a 2014 song by Set It Off from Duality

== See also ==
- "A Sheep in Wolves' Clothes", a 2000 Marvel Comics comic book story arc following Gambit
