= That's What She Said (EP) =

EP by The Friday Night Boys
- Released: October 14, 2008
- Recorded: 2008
- Genre: Powerpop, Pop punk, Electronica
- Length: 15:17
- Label: Fueled By Ramen

The Friday Night Boys chronology
The Sketch Process EP (2008)	That's What She Said (2008)	Off the Deep End (2009)

That's What She Said is an EP by The Friday Night Boys. It was released on October 14, 2008, with Fueled By Ramen and produced by Sean Small.

== Track listing ==
No.	Title	Length
1.	"Chasing A Rock Star"	2:50
2.	"That's What She Said"	3:10
3.	"Celebrity Life"	3:19
4.	"High School"	3:11
5.	"Thursday Night Pregame"	2:47
