= Skybox =

Skybox may refer to:

- Skybox (band), an American indie pop band
- Skybox (sports), a type of private luxury seating area in sports stadiums
- Skybox (video games), a construct used in 3D graphics to simulate skies
- Skybox Imaging, a satellite operator
- SkyBox International, a trading card company
- SkyBox Labs, video game developer
- Sky box or Digibox, a set-top box provided by Sky UK
- Skybox, a song from Wunna (album)
- SkyBOX, a waterslide by ProSlide Technology
