= Who Are You Now? (album) =

Studio album by This Providence
- Released: March 17, 2009
- Studio: The Lair Recording Studio, Los Angeles, California
- Genre: Alternative rock
- Length: 43:44
- Label: Fueled by Ramen
- Producer: Matt Squire

This Providence chronology
The Bright Lights (EP) (2008)	Who Are You Now? (2009)	Brier (EP) (2012)

Who Are You Now? is the third full-length studio album by alternative rock band This Providence, released on March 17, 2009. The album title comes from the song "Playing the Villain", the album's eleventh track.

== Background ==
The album is the band's first full-length album after the departure of bassist Phil Cobrea, drummer Ryan Tapert, and guitarist Sean Gasperetti, and the addition of bassist David Blaise and drummer Andy Horst. The album was recorded at The Lair in Los Angeles. The album's release received support from Paramore, Travie McCoy of Gym Class Heroes, Matt MacDonald of The Classic Crime, and others in a YouTube video uploaded by the band's label Fueled by Ramen.

Music videos were released for the tracks "Letdown" and "Keeping on Without You".

== Critical reception ==
MTV News commented on the album's second track, "Letdown", calling it a "fist-pumper of an anthem" with "frenzied overlapping bridges and orgasmic choruses", but did not give a further review of the album as a whole.

== Track listing ==
No.	Title	Length
1.	"Sure as Hell"	1:50
2.	"Letdown"	3:39
3.	"Waste Myself"	2:52
4.	"This Is the Real Thing"	3:19
5.	"Keeping on Without You"	3:44
6.	"Squeaking Wheels and White Light"	2:57
7.	"My Beautiful Rescue (Renovated) (Note: This is a re-arrangement of the fourth track on the band's previous album This Providence.)"	3:23
8.	"That Girl's a Trick"	3:30
9.	"Selfish"	3:23
10.	"Chasing the Wind"	4:10
11.	"Playing the Villain"	3:26
12.	"Sand in Your Shoes"	3:38
13.	"Somebody to Talk To"	3:53
Total length:		43:44

== Personnel ==
- Dan Young – vocals
- Gavin Phillips – guitar
- David Blaise – bass
- Andy Horst – drums
- Paul Dutton – strings arrangement (on "Chasing the Wind")
- Thomas Patton III - vocals, noise (on "Chasing the Wind")
- Produced, recorded, and mixed by Matt Squire
- Mastered by UE Natasi at Sterling Sound

== Charts ==
Chart (2009)	Peak position
US Billboard 200	176
US Heatseekers Albums (Billboard)	11
