= To All Our Fallen Heroes =

Studio album by Ann Beretta
- Released: 1999
- Label: Lookout! Records
- Producer: Bill Stevenson

Ann Beretta chronology
Bitter Tongues (1998)	To All Our Fallen Heroes (1999)	New Union Old Glory (2001)

Professional ratings
Review scores
Source	Rating
AllMusic	2.5/5 stars
The Austin Chronicle	2.5/4 stars

To All Our Fallen Heroes is an album by Ann Beretta. It was released in 1999 on Lookout! Records.

== Critical reception ==
CMJ New Music Report called the album a "blazing document of bright-eyed and bushy-tailed pogo punk." The Austin Chronicle wrote: "All's Bill Stevenson provided the CD's monstrous production, guitars, drums, and vocals, all leaping out of the speakers. Though the songwriting could use some of that, there's plenty of power here to ensure that Ann Beretta must be a scorching live band."

The Reno Gazette-Journal listed To All Our Fallen Heroes as the eighth best album of 1999, writing that "every number is a sing-along with the screaming guitars right up front."

== Track listing ==
1. "Fire In The Hole"
2. "Eye For An Eye"
3. "Push To Shove"
4. "Rumor Town"
5. "Bully Me Now"
6. "Vengeance"
7. "Untitled"
8. "Burning Bridges"
9. "Brothers At Arms"
10. "Like A Riot"
11. "Mad At The World"
12. "Haywire"
13. "Love's Easy Tears"
14. "Surrender" (Cheap Trick Cover)
