= Bitter Tongues =

Studio album by Ann Beretta
- Released: 1997
- Studio: Glass Hand / Montana Studios
- Length: 66:50
- Label: Fueled by Ramen
- Producer: Ann Beretta with Audio Engineers Mark Miley, Michele Ravera

Ann Beretta chronology
| Nobody's Heroes EP (1996/97) | Bitter Tongues (1997) | To All Our Fallen Heroes (1999) |

Professional ratings
Review scores
| Source | Rating |
|---|---|
| AllMusic | 4.5/5 stars |

Bitter Tongues is an album by Ann Beretta, released in 1997 via Fueled by Ramen.

== Critical reception ==
AllMusic wrote that "with some judicious pruning ... Bitter Tongues would be a pop-punk treasure." Reviewing a reissue, Ox-Fanzine noted: "Not that they sound particularly polished today, but back then they were a bit rougher and gruff, but they also had the melancholy, hymn-like melodies on board for which they are valued."

== Track listing ==
1. Forever Family
2. Fuel
3. FM
4. Dirty Faces
5. Mr. Bowling
6. Wasteland
7. Broadway
8. Bottlecaps
9. St. Marks
10. MCA
11. Shovel
12. Costello
13. Hate Mail
14. Tommy Gunn
15. Spite
16. Mary
17. Baker Street
18. Efforts Wasted
19. Crash (Primitives cover)
