= Three Chord Revolution =

Studio album by Ann Beretta
- Released: 2003
- Label: Union 2112 Records

Ann Beretta chronology
New Union Old Glory (2001)	Three Chord Revolution (2003)

Professional ratings
Review scores
Source	Rating
AllMusic	4/5 stars
Punknews.org	3.5/5 stars

Three Chord Revolution is an album by Ann Beretta, released in 2003.

== Critical reception ==
AllMusic called Three Chord Revolution "a fine, modern-day punk rock album." The Richmond Times-Dispatch called it "fast and furious rock, a little on the punk side, with the same knack for a good pop melody as legendary acts like the Ramones and the Clash."

== Track listing ==
1. "Not Invited"
2. "New Revolution"
3. "Built To Last"
4. "Lipstick & Makeup"
5. "Picture Perfect World"
6. "Angry All The Time"
7. "Better Half"
8. "Lost In You"
9. "Until You Be Mine"
10. "Fallout"
11. "Has Been Lullaby"
12. "Long Road Home"
