= The Sketch Process =

EP by The Friday Night Boys
- Released: April 15, 2008
- Recorded: 2008
- Genre: Powerpop, Pop punk, Electronica
- Length: 20:03

The Friday Night Boys chronology
So Friday Night, So Friday Tight EP (2007)	The Sketch Process (2008)	That's What She Said EP (2008)

The Sketch Process is the second EP by The Friday Night Boys. It was released on April 15, 2008, and produced by Sean Small.

== Track listing ==
No.	Title	Length
1.	"That's What She Said"	3:10
2.	"Give It Up"	3:44
3.	"High School"	3:08
4.	"Superman (Save You)"	2:48
5.	"You Do, You Don't"	4:27
6.	"Thursday Night Pregame"	2:47
