= Evolution (Ghost Town album) =

Studio album by Ghost Town
- Released: November 6, 2015
- Recorded: Pulse Studios
- Length: 38:10
- Label: Fueled by Ramen
- Producer: Josh Abraham; Ryan Williams; Oligee; Nico Stadi

Ghost Town chronology
The After Party (2014)	Evolution (2015)

Singles from Evolution
- 1. "Spark" Released: October 16, 2015; 2. "Mean Kids" Released: October 16, 2015

Evolution (stylized as EVØLUTION) is the third studio album by the American electronic rock band Ghost Town. It was released on November 6, 2015 through Fueled by Ramen.

The first single from the album, "Spark", was released on October 16, 2015. The second single, "Mean Kids", Released On The Same Day, October 16, 2015, "Loner", was premiered exclusively on Billboard on October 22, 2015, but the track will not be released as a single.

== Background ==
In July 2015, Evan Pearce, former producer for the band, announced his departure from Ghost Town due to undisclosed health reasons. In the press release, the band announced they would continue as a trio.

Evolution was announced on their Facebook page on September 10, 2015, a day prior to the release of the music video for the first single off the album, "Spark". The album was recorded at Pulse Studios in Spring of 2015 with Josh Abraham, Nico Stadi, Oligee, and Ryan Williams over a span of 6 weeks. A music video for their second single, "Loner" was released alongside the album.

The album, according to Kevin Ghost, has a different message than the band's previous works.

In the past we’ve written a lot of songs about very specific relationships or very specific situations that people go through. This is a broader spectrum. The message has to do with people opening their eyes and not being so tunnel-visioned. Don’t do the first thing someone tells you to do just because it seems like the easiest thing to do. It’s not about what you wear, or how many people follow you, or how you look. It’s about creating a community of like-minded people and accepting everyone.

— Kevin Ghost

The second single off of the album, "Mean Kids", focuses on the subject of bullying. On October 22, 2015, "Loner" was available for preview in an article on Billboard. The band called this song "the loner anthem for our generation."

== Track listing ==
No.	Title	Length
1.	"Spark"	4:30
2.	"Evolution"	3:13
3.	"Mean Kids"	4:24
4.	"Out Alive"	3:05
5.	"Human"	3:20
6.	"Loner"	3:43
7.	"Internet Pirates"	4:27
8.	"Interlude"	1:02
9.	"Candles"	3:32
10.	"Down"	3:14
11.	"Let Go"	3:40
