= The Words You Don't Swallow =

Studio album by Anarbor
- Released: April 20, 2010
- Recorded: 2009–2010
- Genres: Pop rock, alternative rock, pop punk
- Length: 37:29
- Label: Hopeless
- Producer: Mike Green

Anarbor chronology
Free Your Mind (EP) (2009)	The Words You Don't Swallow (2010)	Burnout (2013)

Professional ratings
Review scores
Source	Rating
Kerrang!	4/5 stars
Allmusic	3.0/5 stars

The Words You Don't Swallow is the first full-length studio album by American pop rock band Anarbor. The band recorded the album with Mike Green (who has also recorded for Paramore, Set Your Goals, and Spill Canvas). Their debut album was released on April 20, 2010. The album gets its name from lyrics in the song "Contagious." The album peaked at number 50 on Billboard's Independent Albums chart and number 16 on the Heatseekers chart.

== Track listing ==
No.	Title	Length
1.	"Contagious"	3:25
2.	"Drugstore Diet"	2:57
3.	"Gypsy Woman"	3:09
4.	"Mr. Big Shot"	3:25
5.	"Let the Games Begin"	3:20
6.	"Going to Jail"	3:17
7.	"The Whole World"	3:19
8.	"Carefree Highway"	3:50
9.	"I Do What I Do"	3:28
10.	"This Can't Be Healthy"	3:29
11.	"Useless"	3:50

== Singles ==
- "Gypsy Woman"
- "Useless"

== Personnel ==
- Slade Echeverria – lead vocals, bass
- Greg Garrity – drums, backing vocals
- Michael Kitlas – rhythm guitar, backing vocals
- Adam Juwig – lead guitar
