= Jamie Woolford =

English musician

- Origin: Luton, England
- Genres: rock; punk; pop; ska; hardcore
- Instruments: Vocals; drums; guitar; bass; piano; tambourine
- Years active: 1987–present
- Labels: Get Well Records; Fueled By Ramen; The Militia Group; JVC; Victor Japan
- Member of: The Stereo; Animal Chin; Let Go
- Website: jamiewoolford.com

Jamie Woolford (born 15 November 1974 in Luton, England) is a record producer, engineer, mixer, singer-songwriter, music video producer, and musician. He is a founding member of rock bands The Stereo, Let Go and Animal Chin. In 2013, he released his first solo record title "A Framed Life In Charming Light" on Get Well Records. He also produced the film Kiss Me Quick: a film by The Stereo.

Credits include: Weezer, Smoking Popes, Gin Blossoms, Chris Demakes (of Less Than Jake), Stephen Egerton (Descendents / ALL), Punchline, The Story Changes, The Format, Andrew Dost (of fun), Man Alive, Gene The Werewolf, The Wretched Desert (Zach Lind of Jimmy Eat World), Vanilla Sky, The A.K.A.s, The Promise Hero, The Impossibles, Protagonist, and many more.

Woolford has been married for over 13 years to his wife Erika and they share 4 children together.
