= The Promise Hero =

American rock band

- The Promise Hero

Background information
- Origin: Cleveland, Ohio, United States
- Genre: Pop punk/Alternative/Rock
- Years active: 2006 – present
- Label: TDR Records
- Members: Bobby Vaughn
- Past members: Kevin Buchanan; Dan Evans; Daniel Weiss; Jeff DiLorenzo; Frank Fini
- Website: thepromisehero.com

The Promise Hero is a rock band from Cleveland, Ohio.

== History ==
The Promise Hero was established in 2006 by longtime friends and collaborators Bobby Vaughn and Daniel Weiss after the breakup of The Honor Role in 2005, which included vocalist Justin Vaughn, Bobby's brother. The original line-up included Vocalist Bobby Vaughn, guitarist Daniel Weiss, bassist Kevin Buchanan, and drummer Dan Evans. With this roster, the group released its debut EP, The Promise Hero, in 2006. Not long after the release of the group's EP, The Promise Hero underwent a change in its rhythm section by replacing bassist Kevin Buchanan and drummer Dan Evans with Jeff DiLorenzo and Frank Fini, respectively. Members of the band claim they settled upon the name The Promise Hero after it was donated to them by a friend of the group.

In 2007, The Promise Hero recorded demos produced by Saves the Day front-man Chris Conley, and shortly after signed with Chicago-based independent label, TDR Records, who re-released the band's debut EP. The following summer, The Promise Hero went to Tempe, Arizona to record their debut full-length album, Wait For The Sun, with producer Jamie Woolford. Released on 28 October 2008, Wait For The Sun was met with generally positive reviews. In support of Wait For The Sun, The Promise Hero spent the summer of 2009 selling the album to the lines of concertgoers waiting to get into each stop of the Vans Warped Tour. Tours of the Midwest and East Coast followed in the fall of 2009 and into the spring of 2010. Three of the four members left the band for personal reasons, but Bobby has continued on his own. He has been joined on tour by Joe Lowrie (drums), Ryan Grimes(bass), Evan Stone(guitar), Aaron Foreman(bass), and former TPH band member, Jeff DiLorenzo(guitar/bass). Bobby still uses the name The Promise Hero to write and release music. In 2013, Vaughn released Déjà Vu, once again enlisting the help of producer Jamie Woolford. As of early 2015, Vaughn has announced that he is writing and plans to release a new album, though no tentative date has been announced.

== Discography ==
- The Promise Hero (CD/EP) 2008
- Wait For the Sun (CD/LP) 2008
- Okay, Cool (CD/EP) 2010
- Déjà Vu (CD/LP) 2013

== Music videos ==
2014	"Locked Up Alone & End of the World"	Vince Lundi	Déjà Vu
2014	"Still Awake"	Bradd Smith	Déjà Vu
2014	"Let Love In"	Steve Tsentserensky	Déjà Vu
2013	"Keep It Flowing"	Steve Tsentserensky	Déjà Vu
2010	"Winning or Losing"	Steve Tsentserensky	Wait for the Sun
2009	"Wait for the Sun"	Steve Tsentserensky	Wait for the Sun
2009	"Heartbreak Baby"	Steve Tsentserensky	Wait for the Sun
