= The Pleasure to Remain So Heartless =

Studio album by Kane Hodder
- Released: April 12, 2005
- Recorded: 2004
- Genre: Melodic hardcore, Indie rock
- Length: 43:28
- Label: Suburban Home Records; Cowboy Vs Sailor; Fueled by Ramen (re-release)
- Producer: T Dallas Reed

Second Edition
- Fueled By Ramen rerelease with DVD

Professional ratings
Review scores
Source	Rating
AbsolutePunk.net	(79%)

The Pleasure to Remain So Heartless is the second studio album from Bremerton, Washington band Kane Hodder. It was released in 2004 by Suburban Home Records, and re-released in 2005 on Fueled by Ramen records with new artwork, and a bonus DVD which features live performances, as well as the music video for "I Think Patrick Swayze is Sexy".

== Track listing ==
1. "Last of the Anti-Fascist Warriors"
2. "I Think Patrick Swayze Is Sexy"
3. "Jason Dean Was a Teen Liberator"
4. "Too Much Eddie Kenndricks, Not Enough David Ruffin"
5. "Heaven Help Me! I Love a Psychotic!"
6. "A Machine in the World of Man"
7. "You Sign Your Crimes With a Silver Bullet"
8. "The Child of Prophecy"
9. "Crushing Everything in Sight"
10. "Attack on Tir Asleen"
11. "Assault at First Light"
