= Burnout (Anarbor album) =

Studio album by Anarbor
- Released: June 4, 2013
- Recorded: 2012
- Genre: Pop-punk, alternative rock
- Length: 34:45
- Label: Hopeless Records
- Producer: Matt Mahaffey

Anarbor chronology
The Words You Don't Swallow (2010)	Burnout (2013)	Anarbor (2016)

Singles from Burnout
- 1. "Whiskey in Hell" Released: February 7, 2012; 2. "Damage I've Done" Released: October 22, 2012; 3. "Every High Has A Come Down" Released: May 7, 2013; 4. "Who Can Save Me Now" Released: May 14, 2013

Burnout is the second studio album by alternative rock band Anarbor released by Hopeless Records. It was released on June 4, 2013. It peaked at #40 on the Billboard Heatseekers chart. This was the last album to include guitarist Mike Kitlas before his departure from the band in 2013 and the first and the only album to include Dave Melillo.

== Background ==
The band started work on their sophomore album in 2012, and worked with producer Matt Mahaffey for the first time. When asked about the experience vocalist Slade Echeverria said "We normally sit down and write 11 or 12 songs and that's the album. This time, we wrote forty or fifty songs. We picked some of the best ones that came out of that as well as co-writing with other people." This, according to Echeverria, was the first time the band brought in other writers to help create the album. Prior, the band had written all their songs by themselves.

== Promotion and release ==
A rough cut of their first single, "Whiskey in Hell" was released in early 2012. The second single, "Damage I've Done" was released on iTunes on December 5, 2012, along with an accompanying music video. Lyric videos for the next two singles, "Every High Has A Come Down" and "Who Can Save Me Now", as well as "18" were released throughout May 2013. Each, with the exception of "18", was released as a single on iTunes as well.

== Reception ==
Professional ratings
Review scores
Source	Rating
Alternative Press	3/5 stars
AbsolutePunk	(9/10)
Mind Equals Blown	(7/10)
Star Pulse	B
AllMusic	4/5 stars

The album received mostly positive reviews. Echeverria's vocals, the catchy choruses, and the instrumentals were considered the highlights of the album. Reviewer from AbsolutePunk said "Everything about Burnout is vastly better than their old stuff, and Anarbor has a pretty solid, albeit small, discography. Stronger lyrics, better instrumentals, and most importantly, better song themes. Old Anarbor was enjoyable stuff, but after hearing a dozen or so songs about drugs I was left wanting something deeper. Burnout provides that, and more." Fred Thomas of AllMusic wrote that "On second full-length Burnout (which follows several EPs), the bandmembers seem intent on showing how much they've matured, with lyrical themes tending toward debauchery, self-medication, and the type of destructive, drama-fueled relationships that seem to happen with people in their early twenties."

== Track listing ==
No.	Title	Length
1.	"Every High Has a Come Down"	3:17
2.	"Damage I've Done"	3:52
3.	"18"	2:37
4.	"Whiskey in Hell"	2:54
5.	"Who Can Save Me Now"	3:14
6.	"I Hate You So Much"	3:09
7.	"Take My Pain Away"	3:33
8.	"It's a Fact"	3:17
9.	"I Don't Love You Anymore"	3:14
10.	"Freaks"	2:51
11.	"Rock to My Roll"	2:47
Total length:		34:45

(Deluxe Edition)

No.	Title	Length
12.	"Before the World Ends"	3:31
13.	"What He Don't Know"	3:20
14.	"Every High Has a Come Down (Acoustic)"	3:13
15.	"18 (Acoustic)"	2:42
16.	"Take My Pain Away (Acoustic)"	3:33
17.	"Whiskey in Hell (Acoustic)"	3:04
Total length:		54:08

== Personnel ==
Anarbor

- Slade Echeverria – lead vocals, bass
- Greg Garrity – drums, backing vocals
- Michael Kitlas – rhythm guitar, backing vocals
- Dave Melillo – lead guitar

Additional personnel

- Marshall Altman – Writer
- Dave Bassett – Writer
- Sean Douglas – Writer
- Michael Fossenkemper – Mastering
- Christopher Fudurich – Mixing
- Ledbetter – Artwork, layout
- Bill Lefler – Writer
- Matt Mahaffey – Writer, Fender Rhodes, percussion, piano, producer
- Dave Melillo – Guitars
- Ashley Osborn – Band photo
- Drew Pearson – Writer
- Morgan Reid – Writer
- Megan Thompson – Band photo
- Simon Wilcox – Writer
