= New Union Old Glory =

Studio album by Ann Beretta
- Released: 2001
- Label: Lookout! Records

Ann Beretta chronology
To All Our Fallen Heroes (1999)	New Union Old Glory (2001)	Three Chord Revolution (2003)

Professional ratings
Review scores
Source	Rating
AllMusic	2.5/5 stars
Punknews.org	4/5 stars

New Union Old Glory is an album by Ann Beretta, released in 2001 via Lookout! Records.

== Critical reception ==
Exclaim! wrote that "the dozen tracks are simple, down and dirty punkers that recall another time when punk rock was about a work ethic and not scoring a coveted spot on a summer tour." The East Bay Express called it "boisterous, anthemic classic punk with hoarse vocals, buzzing power chords, surfin' drums, and feel-good rabble-rousing revolution."

== Track listing ==
1. "Straight Shooter (Election Day)"
2. "Latchkey World"
3. "Nowhere Generation"
4. "Better Days"
5. "Russ' Song"
6. "New Union"
7. "Glory Bound"
8. "Locked, Ready & Loaded"
9. "No Rest For The Wicked"
10. "Upstarts & Runaways II"
11. "New Day"
12. "Jump Start (Revolution)"
