= The Kicks of Passion =

Studio album by Powerspace
- Released: July 31, 2007
- Genre: Pop punk, power pop
- Label: Fueled By Ramen
- Producer: Marc McClusky

Professional ratings
Review scores
Source	Rating
AbsolutePunk.net	(75%)

The Kicks of Passion is the debut studio album from the pop punk band, Powerspace. It was released by Fueled By Ramen Records on July 31, 2007.

== Track listing ==
1. "Prologue: Adam Beckett" - 3:35
2. "Quarantine My Heart (Baby)" - 3:37
3. "Powerspace Snap Bracelet" - 2:35
4. "Right On, Right Now" - 3:40
5. "Amplifire" - 4:23
6. "Be Aggressive" - 2:49
7. "This Is Not What You Had Planned" - 3:13
8. "Dancing in the Future" - 3:02
9. "Choose Your Own Adventure" - 3:51
10. "It Smells Like Electricity in Here" - 2:43
11. "I Met My Best Friend in Prague" - 3:27
12. "Sleep, Everyone..." - 3:41

=== iTunes bonus tracks ===
1. "Stoned In Love" - 3:36
2. "All Out, All Night" - 3:14
3. "You Vs. Me Round III" [Demo] - 3:30

== Trivia ==
- The songs "Prologue: Adam Beckett", "Powerspace Snap Bracelet", "Right On, Right Now", and "It Smells Like Electricity In Here" were all featured on the Houston, We Have A Party EP.
- The song "I Met My Best Friend In Prague" is the album version of the Houston, We Have A Party EP song, "I Put The 'Abs' In Abstinence."
