= A Season in Hell (album) =

Studio album by October Fall
- Released: February 21, 2006
- Genres: Power pop, pop rock
- Labels: Decaydance, Fueled by Ramen
- Producer: Mike Green

October Fall chronology
| Taking Shape EP (2005) | A Season in Hell (2006) |

Singles from A Season in Hell
- 1. "Caught In the Rain" Released: February 14, 2006; 2. "Second Chances" Released: November 13, 2006

Professional ratings
Review scores
| Source | Rating |
|---|---|
| AbsolutePunk.net | 67% |
| LAS Magazine | 3/10 |
| Melodic | 3.5/5 stars |

A Season in Hell is Chicago pop-punk band October Fall's first and only album, released on February 21, 2006.

== Track listing ==
All lyrics are written by Pat D'Andrea; all music is composed by Pat D'Andrea and October Fall.

| No. | Title | Length |
|---|---|---|
| 1. | "Second Chances" | 2:57 |
| 2. | "Caught in the Rain" | 3:32 |
| 3. | "Keep Dreaming Upside Down" | 4:32 |
| 4. | "Walking" | 3:22 |
| 5. | "It Was Summer... (Baby Steps)" | 3:36 |
| 6. | "Tongue Tied" | 4:23 |
| 7. | "Hey Hey" | 3:50 |
| 8. | "Here We Go from the Top" | 2:51 |
| 9. | "Keep It Comin'" | 3:21 |
| 10. | "A Part of Me" | 3:36 |
| 11. | "If We're All Alone, Aren't We in This Together?" | 6:49 |
| Total length: | | 43:00 |

== Personnel ==
October Fall

- Pat D'Andrea – lead vocals, guitar
- Clark Harrison – lead guitar, backing vocals
- Nick Scalise – drums, percussion
- Owen Toomey aka O-Boats – piano, backing vocals
- Greg Shanahan – bass, backing vocals

Guest musicians

- Patrick Stump (Fall Out Boy) – additional vocals on "Second Chances".
- Hayley Williams (Paramore) – additional vocals on "Keep Dreaming Upside Down" and backing vocals on "Caught In the Rain"
