= Anarbor =

American rock band

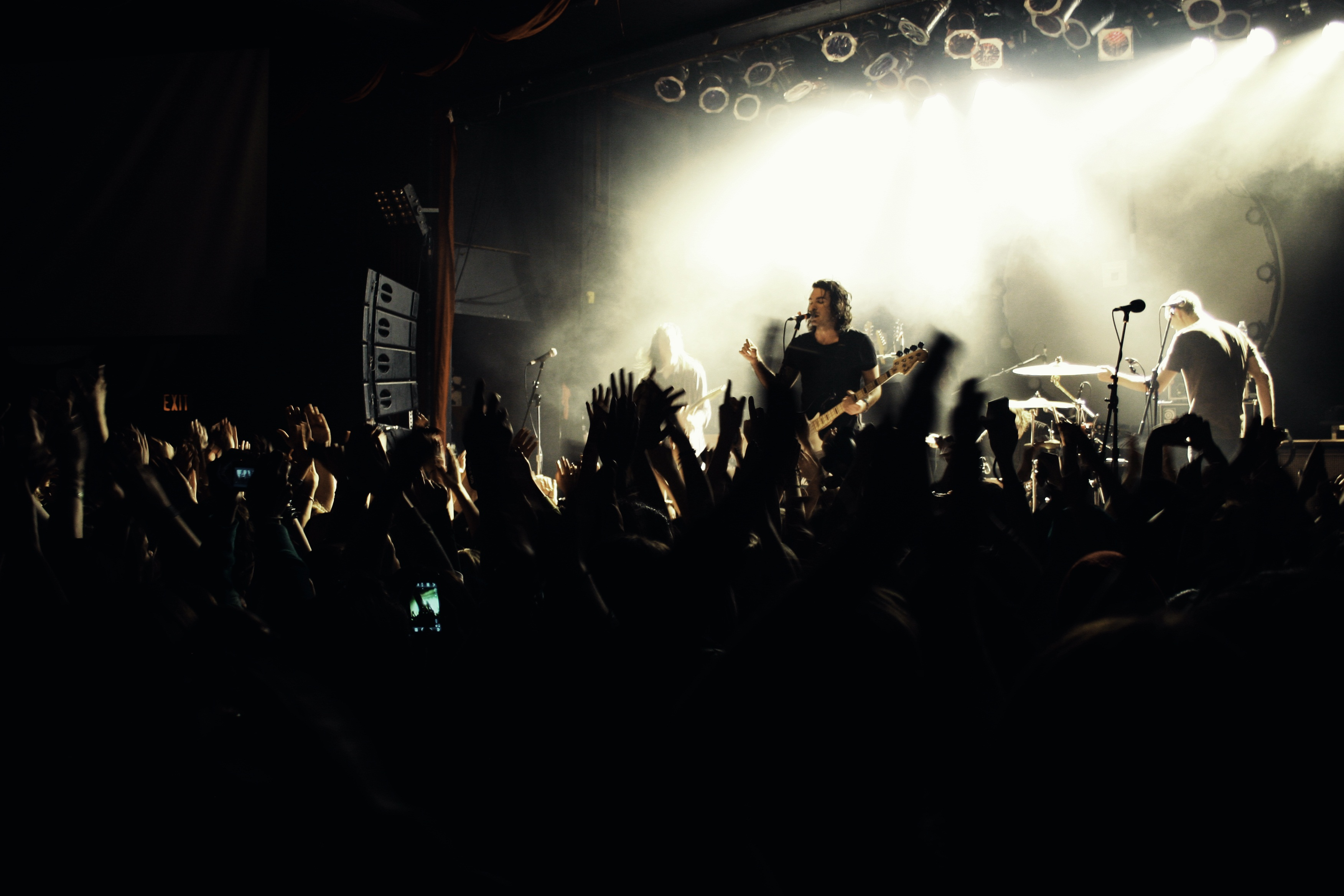
- Anarbor performing in Toronto, April 2011

Background information
- Origin: Phoenix, Arizona, U.S.
- Genres: Pop rock, alternative rock, synth-pop, indie pop, soft rock, pop punk (earlier years)
- Years active: 2003–present (hiatus: 2014–2015, 2019–2022)
- Label: Independent
- Members: Slade Echeverria; Danny Stravers
- Past members: Jessica Myers; Adam Juwig; Michael Kitlas; Greg Garrity; Dave Melillo; Tyler Hedstrom (deceased); William Wilson

Anarbor is an American rock band from Phoenix which was formed in 2003. The band is composed of lead vocalist/bassist Slade Echeverria and guitarist Danny Stravers. Initially known as "Troop 101", the band changed their name to "Anarbor" later. In April 2008, the band was signed to Hopeless Records while still attending high school in Arizona. Since then, the band has released four EPs and four studio albums.

== History ==
The band, formed by: Slade Echevierra (vocals and bass), Adam Juwig (lead guitar), Michael Kitlas (rhythm guitar), Greg Garrity (drums) began playing together in Garrity's garage in the southern Phoenix community of Ahwatukee in early 2003. They played their first show on July 17, 2003, at Skateland in Chandler, adjacent to Ahwatukee. Shortly after the band's first show, they added Jessica Myers on bass. The band continued to play the Phoenix metro area while they went to high school. In December 2004, the band recorded their debut EP, "You Brought This On Yourself" with producer Matt Grabe, which was released locally in May 2005.

They changed their name to Anarbor stemming from the fact that former guitarist Mike Kitlas' sister was born in Ann Arbor, Michigan. Their self-released EP, Hearing Colours, Seeing Sounds, was released digitally in March 2008 and peaked at No. 62 on Amazon.com's Top Album chart.

Their debut Hopeless Records release, The Natural Way, came out on August 19, 2008. The four song digital release debuted at No. 6 on the Billboard Top Singles Album Chart. In October 2008, Myers announced her departure from the band, due to excessive touring and her interest in going to college. An acoustic version of Anarbor's song "Passion for Publication" appeared in the compilation Take Action! Volume 9.

The band released Free Your Mind on March 10, 2009. On April 20, 2010, the band released their first full-length studio album, entitled The Words You Don't Swallow, which peaked at number 50 on Billboard's Independent Albums chart and number 16 on the Heatseekers chart. On March 8, 2011, the group released an EP of cover songs and remixes entitled The Mixtape. In 2012 the band released two singles: "Whiskey In Hell (Rough Cut)", which was released on February 7, and "Damage I've Done", released on October 2. On May 6, 2013, Anarbor announced that their new album would be called Burnout and that it would be released via Hopeless Records on June 4. On the same day they released a lyric video for a new song, "Every High Has a Come Down". On May 14, 2013, Anarbor released a lyric video for another song off of Burnout, titled "Who Can Save Me Now", via the Hopeless Records YouTube Channel. On May 29, the entire album was uploaded for streaming on YouTube. Shortly before the album release, Mike Kitlas announced his departure from the band, being the second original member to leave.

On September 20, 2014, The band announced on Twitter that they did not break up, but are "taking a bit of a break". A year later, the band posted on Twitter that they were working on new music. Throughout early 2016, the band posted on their Facebook that they were in the process of recording and mixing a new album. They announced on April 13 that they had finished the new album. On July 29, 2016, they released their self-titled album. No longer on Hopeless Records, they released their album independently. After the recording of the album was done, Daniel Stravers joined the band, being the new rhythm guitarist after Kitlas' departure after Burnout. It was also the last studio album to feature both original members: Greg Garrity (who announced his departure before the Self-Titled release) and Adam Juwig (who left the band later, in 2019).

In November 2016 Anarbor went on a US tour supporting Emarosa along with Cold Collective. In the month of July 2017 they went on tour with Sundressed touring the West Coast, Pacific Northwest, and parts of the Midwest in the United States. On July 29, 2017, the band released an official statement saying that drummer Tyler Hedstrom had died on Wednesday, July 26, 2017, by suicide at the age of 17. The band and his family had set a goal of $15,000 to pay for Hedstrom's funeral expenses. The fundraising stopped after the band and family raised over $20,000. The band performed the song, "Pushaway", for the first time at his memorial service.

In 2018, the band released The EP, a three-song EP, as the first record to feature Danny Stravers on guitar. In 2020 they released the Tangerine EP, another three-song EP, with the song "Tangerine" as a strong sign of their shift to a much more poppy sound.

In 2022, they released five singles leading up to the release of their latest studio album, Love & Drugs.

== Television ==
The song "Let the Games Begin" was featured on an episode of MTV's series The Hills. In addition, Anarbor's music is featured daily on ESPN's top-rated show SportsCenter.

Anarbor was chosen to write and record the theme song for Scooby-Doo! The Mystery Begins. They filmed a music video, "You and I", which aired on Cartoon Network showcasing the tune, in addition to playing on the movie's trailer. Anarbor's tune "Let the Games Begin" is the theme song to "Good Day L.A.", a national talk show broadcast from Los Angeles. "Let the Games Begin" was also featured on the NFL kickoff show, on NBC, during a recap of the 2008–2009 season. "Let the Games Begin" was featured in the episode "Boards of Glory" in Stoked, a hit Canadian cartoon on Teletoon. "Let the Games Begin" is the theme song for MLB Network Countdown.

Anarbor competed on the MTV comedy Silent Library which first aired on July 21, 2010. "Always Dirty, Never Clean" was featured on Jersey Shore season two, episode one. "Passion for Publication" and "Let The Games Begin" were also featured on Jersey Shore season two, episode four. "You and I" was also featured in the episode "Brofinger" from Stoked. Anarbor was featured on the MTV show 10 on Top which first aired on April 2, 2011.

== Band members ==
Current members

- Slade Echeverria – lead vocals (2003–present), bass (2008–present)
- Daniel Stravers – lead and rhythm guitar, backing vocals (2016–present)

Former members

- Jessica "Jess" Myers – bass (2003–2008)
- Michael "Mike" Kitlas – rhythm guitar, backing vocals (2003–2013)
- Gregory "Greg" Garrity – drums, percussion, backing vocals (2003–2013, 2016)
- Adam Juwig – lead guitar (2003–2012, 2016–2019)
- Dave Melillo – lead guitar (2012–2013)
- Tyler Hedstrom – drums, percussion (2016–2017; his death)
- William Wilson – drums (2017–2018)

Former touring members

- Justin Bradley – rhythm guitar, backing vocals, percussion (2008–2013; died 2024)
- Steven Kopacz – drums, percussion (2013)
- Josh Withenshaw – lead guitar (2013)
- Kyle Rodgers – drums, percussion (2016–2017)
- Alex Hedstrom – rhythm guitar (2016–2017)
- Brandon Simoes – keyboards (2016–2017)

== Tour ==
- In June 2006, Anarbor went on their first tour which was the West Coast leg of the Home Is Where You Make It tour featuring The Scene Aesthetic and Danger:Radio.
- In June 2008, Anarbor toured throughout the West Coast and Midwest with The Summer Set and Eye Alaska.
- In September and October 2008, Anarbor toured the East Coast and Midwest with The Bigger Lights, The Years Gone By, and School Boy Humor.
- In December 2008, Anarbor toured the West Coast with The Scenic and TV/TV.
- In February through April 2009, Anarbor toured on the Take Action Tour with Cute Is What We Aim For, Meg and Dia, Breathe Carolina, and Every Avenue.
- In May through June 2009, Anarbor toured with main act Forgive Durden, and You, Me, and Everyone We Know.
- In summer 2009, they toured with main act The Cab, The Summer Set, Eye Alaska, and The Secret Handshake on the What happens in Vegas Tour.
- In late summer 2009, they also attended the Warped Tour for four days in July.
- In October 2009, they toured with Straylight Run, Lydia, and Camera Can't Lie.
- In 2009, from late-September to early October, Anarbor toured with the Almost, This Providence, and the Dares.
- In winter 2010, Anarbor joined the Friday Night Boys, the Ready Set, The Bigger Lights, and Great Big Planes on the Once It Hit Your Lips Tour.
- In spring 2010, Anarbor joined This Providence, the Audition, and The Bigger Lights on the 'Bout Damn Time Tour.
- In spring 2010, Anarbor was on the Give It A Name Tour in the UK with The Swellers
- In summer 2010, Anarbor was on the Beyond the Blue tour in Japan with Valencia, There for Tomorrow, and Artist vs Poet. The band was on the way to their first show in Osaka when drummer Greg Garrity fell and broke his jaw at a rest stop. The band had to cancel the remainder of the tour dates and fly back home to the United States.
- In summer 2010, Anarbor was on the Warped Tour.
- In fall 2010, Anarbor was on tour with VersaEmerge for the Vultures Unite Tour.
- In spring 2011, Anarbor was on tour with A Rocket To The Moon, Valencia, Runner Runner, and Go Radio for the On Your Side Tour.
- In summer 2011, Anarbor was on the Beyond The Blue Tour in Japan with Mayday Parade, The Summer Set, With the Punches and Destine.
- In summer 2011, Anarbor was on the Zumiez Couch Tour for ten dates with Forever The Sickest Kids
- In summer 2011, Anarbor had a cross country tour co-headlining with Valencia; Conditions and NGHBRS also performed.
- In winter 2012, Anarbor was on tour with Mayday Parade, We the Kings, and The Downtown Fiction for the End of the World Tour 2012.
- In December 2012, Anarbor toured with NeverShoutNever!, Plug In Stereo, and William Beckett.
- In summer 2013, Anarbor played the Warped Tour. They played the #Domo Stage with Tonight Alive and Stick To Your Guns from June 15–20 and June 22-August 4.
- In November 2016, Anarbor performed across the United States with Emarosa and Cold Collective.
- In July 2017, Anarbor went on a headlining tour of the West Coast, Pacific Northwest, and Midwest with Sundressed.
- In spring 2018, Anarbor played four concerts in Phoenix, Brooklyn, Washington and Lakewood.

== Discography ==
Release date	Album title	Record label
May 6, 2005	You Brought This On Yourself (Troop 101)	Self-Release
March 4, 2008	Hearing Colours, Seeing Sounds	Self-Release
August 19, 2008	The Natural Way	Hopeless//Sub City Records
March 10, 2009	Free Your Mind	Hopeless//Sub City Records
April 20, 2010	The Words You Don't Swallow	Hopeless//Sub City Records
March 8, 2011	The Mixtape	Hopeless//Sub City Records
June 4, 2013	Burnout	Hopeless Records
July 29, 2016	Anarbor	Independent
August 14, 2018	The EP	ELVN ELVN RCRDS
July 24, 2020	Tangerine	Independent
September 2, 2022	Love & Drugs	Independent
