= Off the Deep End (The Friday Night Boys album) =

Studio album by The Friday Night Boys
- Released: June 9, 2009
- Genre: Neon pop punk; power pop; pop punk
- Label: Fueled by Ramen/Photo Finish Records/ThePartyScene
- Producer: Emanuel Kiriakou; Benny Blanco

The Friday Night Boys chronology
| That's What She Said (EP) (2008) | Off the Deep End (2009) |

Singles from Off the Deep End
- 1. "Stuttering" Released: 2009; 2. "Stupid Love Letter" Released: 2009

Off the Deep End is the debut and only studio album by American rock band The Friday Night Boys. It was released on June 9, 2009 by Fueled By Ramen.

== Release ==
Between March and May 2009, the band supported Sing It Loud on their headlining US tour, which included an appearance at The Bamboozle festival. Off the Deep End was released on June 9, 2009 and peaked at number 198 on the Billboard 200 on June 27, 2009. On July 10, 2009, a music video was released for "Stuttering". Two singles were released from the album, "Stuttering" and "Stupid Love Letter". The album was produced by Emanuel Kiriakou and mixed by Serban Ghenea.

== Critical reception ==
Professional ratings
Review scores
| Source | Rating |
|---|---|
| AllMusic | 3/5 stars |
| Alternative Press | 2.5/5 stars |
| Melodic | 3.5/5 stars |

AllMusic's Jason Thurston said, "the group easily, breezily tears through 12 tales of young lust, debauchery, and the occasional awkward moment. It's the pop-punk speed fans have come to expect from the Fueled by Ramen label, but with an emphasis on the genre's first word." Chris Parker of Alternative Press felt that Off the Deep End "can be a fun spin, provided you haven't already done this circuit before. They're not groundbreakers, but miners of familiar emo-pop tropes... The Boys' juvenilia is charming and sweet, if light on originality or substance". Kaj Roth of Melodic said, "The Friday Night Boys could be the next big thing, their pop punk is addictive with singalong choruses and traces of electro pop... Their style lies somewhere between Simple Plan, the Click Five and Blink 182 - the powerpop tendencies are very obvious in the Click Five-like 'Finding Me Out' or the upbeat 'Hollow'".

== Track listing ==
| No. | Title | Writers | Length |
|---|---|---|---|
| 1. | "Permanent Heartbreak" | Andrew Goldstein, Jess Cates, Emanuel Kiriakou, Lindy Robbins | 3:16 |
| 2. | "Stupid Love Letter" | Goldstein, Benjamin Levin, Neon Hitch | 2:57 |
| 3. | "Suicide Sunday" | Goldstein, David Hodges, Kiriakou, Robbins | 3:24 |
| 4. | "She's Finding Me Out" | Goldstein, Cates, Kiriakou, Robbins | 3:48 |
| 5. | "Stuttering" | Goldstein, Kara DioGuardi, Kiriakou | 3:10 |
| 6. | "Can't Take That Away" | Goldstein, Cates, Kiriakou, Robbins | 3:31 |
| 7. | "How I Met Your Mother" | Goldstein, Sam Hollander, Dave Katz | 3:26 |
| 8. | "Hollow" | Goldstein, Robbins | 3:30 |
| 9. | "The First Time (Natalie's Song)" | Goldstein, Hodges, Kiriakou, Robbins | 2:59 |
| 10. | "Molly Makeout" | Goldstein | 3:32 |
| 11. | "Unforget You" | Goldstein, Cates, Kiriakou, Robbins | 3:23 |
| 12. | "Sorry I Stole Your Gurl" | Goldstein | 3:01 |

== Personnel ==
The Friday Night Boys

- Andrew Goldstein – vocals, guitar
- Robby Dallas Reider – bass
- Mike Toohey – guitar, vocals
- Chris Barrett – drums

Additional personnel

- Benny Blanco – drums and keyboards on "Stupid Love Letter"
- Alex Gaskarth - additional vocals on "Molly Makeout"
- Neon Hitch – backing vocals on "Stupid Love Letter"
- Dorian Crozier – additional musician
- Emanuel Kiriakou – producer
- Benny Blanco – co-producer on "Stupid Love Letter"

== Charts ==
| Chart (2009) | Peak position |
|---|---|
| US Billboard 200 | 198 |
