= October Fall =

American pop punk band

- Also known as: Silver Lining
- Origin: Elk Grove Village, Illinois, U.S.
- Genres: Post-hardcore; pop punk; power pop
- Years active: 2003–2007
- Labels: Decaydance, Fueled by Ramen
- Spinoffs: Mathletes, BestFriends, Phonocast, Archie Star
- Members: Pat D'Andrea; Clark Harrison; Nick Scalise; Owen Toomey a.k.a. O-Boats; Greg Shanahan
- Past members: Jack Marin; Nick Coleman

October Fall was an American pop punk band from Chicago, Illinois. They formed in the summer of 2003, with Pat D'Andrea (vocals/guitar) and Clark Harrison (guitar) as the original members. These two originally played together under the name "Silver Lining". Soon after, the rest of the band was added: Nick Coleman (drums), Owen Toomey (piano), and Jack Marin (bass). Nick Coleman was replaced by Nick Scalise (drums), and Jack Marin was replaced by Greg Shanahan (bass).

In 2005, the band opened on a tour with Ashlee Simpson, and later that year, they toured with The Click Five. In the spring of 2006, they toured with Fall Out Boy and The All-American Rejects on the Black Clouds and Underdogs tour.

They were signed to Decaydance, a Fueled By Ramen imprint headed by Pete Wentz (bassist of Fall Out Boy). Their debut CD, A Season in Hell (named as an homage to the movie Eddie and the Cruisers), was released in February 2006.

On October 1, 2007, the band announced to fans on Live Journal that they had gone their separate ways, promoting their new music on separate MySpace pages.

In the fall of 2007, Clark Harrison and Nick Foxer (formerly of the All American Rejects) formed a band called Phonocast, based in southern California.

Pat D'Andrea (now going by Johnny D'Andrea) formed Archie Star, with his sister Maria sharing lead vocals. The band released their only album, Carry Me Home in November 2008.

Nick Scalise and Greg Shanahan are now part of the band Bestfriends.

== History ==
=== Early years ===
Their roots may be in the Chicago scene, but pop is their passion for the members in October Fall: vocalist/guitarist Pat D'Andrea, guitarist Clark Harrison, pianist Owen Toomey, bassist Greg Shanahan, and drummer Nick Scalise.

D'Andrea's early influences were Johnny Cash, Tom Petty and Stevie Ray Vaughan. He would sit in his bedroom playing guitar outlet and accidentally writing songs while attending one of his sister's musicals. D'Andrea met a fellow musician, Clark Harrison, and the two began jamming together as "Silver Lining". With high ambitions and a budding arsenal of songs, the duo changed its name to "October Fall" and solidified a line-up with Toomey, Scalise and Shanahan.

After selling out shows to just open the band, the whole town took notice. It was one of the scene's alumni, Fall Out Boy's Pete Wentz, who wrote the band to his Fueled By Ramen imprint Decaydance. From there, the band prepared to record their debut album and soon hit the road with Ashlee Simpson.

The inspiration for the title of October Fall's debut, A Season in Hell comes from a cult classic movie, Eddie and the Cruisers, which actually premiered in theaters before any of the band members (all of which were still in their teens) were even born.

=== A Season in Hell (2006) ===
In the summer of 2005, they migrated westward to record at The Green Room in Los Angeles, California, with producer Mike Green (Yellowcard Rufio Paramore). In September and October 2005, they went on a two-month US cross-country tour with Just Surrender, My American Heart, and Lorene Drive. In May 2006, they appeared at The Bamboozle festival.

The song "Walking" set October Fall's sound movement is a piano-driven rocker, thinking about a girl, who cannot look himself in the mirror, not satisfied with simply writing about Heartaches and Heart-Breaker "Hey Hey" deals with the harsh tale of a turbulent friendship. A Season in Hell also features guest appearances by Fall Out Boy's Patrick Stump (song "Second Chance") and Paramore's Hayley Williams (on "Keep Dreaming Upside Down").

=== Post-breakup (2007) ===
On October 1, 2007, the band announced that they had gone their separate ways.

In the fall of 2007, Clark Harrison and Nick Foxer (formerly of the All American Rejects) formed a band called Phonocast, based in southern California where both musicians now live.

Pat D'Andrea formed Archie Star, in which he shares lead vocals with his sister, Maria. The band released their album, Carry Me Home in November 2008.

== Band members ==
Later members

- Pat D'Andrea - lead vocals, Guitar (2003–2007)
- Clark Harrison- lead guitar, backing vocals (2003–2007)
- Nick Scalise - Drums, percussion (2005–2007)
- Owen Toomey a.k.a. O-Boats - piano, backing vocals (2004–2007)
- Greg Shanahan - bass, backing vocals (2005–2007)

Early members

- Nick Coleman - Drums, percussion (2004–2005)
- Jack Marin - bass, backing vocals (2004–2005)

== Discography ==
=== Albums ===
Date of release	Title	Label	Billboard 200 peak
February 21, 2006	A Season in Hell	Decaydance Records/Fueled by Ramen	-

=== EPs ===
- Taking Shape 2005

=== Album appearances ===
Fueled By Ramen & Decaydance Winter '05/'06 iTunes Sampler

- Released: November 22, 2005
- Label: Fueled By Ramen Decaydance Records
- Tracks: "Walking (Unreleased)"

== Later events ==
- Guitarist Clark Harrison was a winning contestant on the Fox Kids TV show Moolah Beach.
- Jack Marin, original bassist, played bass in Cute Is What We Aim For, for a short time after parting ways with October Fall.
- Drummer Nick Scalise has a solo project called Sexy Is My Middle Name.
- Pat D'Andrea appeared in an episode of the TV series Switched. Then, he reappeared one year later in a reunion episode.
