= Vinyl Theatre =

American indie rock band

- Origin: Milwaukee, Wisconsin, U.S.
- Genres: Alternative rock; indietronica; electropop; indie rock; indie pop
- Years active: 2012–2019, 2020, 2022 - Present
- Labels: Outerwave Records; Fueled by Ramen
- Members: Chris Senner; Nick Cesarz; Keegan Calmes
- Past members: Josh Pothier
- Website: vinyltheatre.com

Vinyl Theatre is an American indie rock band from Milwaukee, Wisconsin, formed by Keegan Calmes and Chris Senner. The band later grew to include Josh Pothier and Nick Cesarz. Before being signed to an official record label, they produced several singles that were released on the band's SoundCloud page, leading up to the release of Chromatic EP in 2014. The band was then signed to Fueled by Ramen later in 2014. They released their first studio album, Electrogram, with Fueled by Ramen on September 23, 2014. Vinyl Theatre supported the album by going on a national tour in the United States with the musical duo Twenty One Pilots.

The band has said to be influenced by other bands such as Death Cab For Cutie, Two Door Cinema Club, The Shins, The Killers, Young the Giant, and Twenty One Pilots.

== History ==
=== Formation (2012–2014) ===
Singer and guitarist Keegan Calmes first met keyboardist Chris Senner at a cross-country meet in high school. They decided after getting to know each other that they would meet up again, this time to begin writing and practicing songs. Calmes left Wisconsin to attend college at Adams State University in Colorado while Senner attended college at University of Wisconsin–Milwaukee. The two wrote songs and shared ideas over Skype and email and eventually recorded a demo CD together. Senner emailed one of his friends from college, Nick Cesarz, and asked him to record drums over their tracks. Cesarz was brought into the band once Calmes and Senner gave their approval of his recording. Keegan returned home from Colorado, having dropped out to be able to pursue music as a career. The band was in need of a bass player, so Chris contacted a high school friend, Josh Pothier, and asked him to join. With his parents' blessing, Pothier dropped out of college, where he was close to finishing a degree in psychology, to join the band.

The group first called themselves "Alchemy", but after searching on the internet, they found other bands either with the same or similar names, making it difficult for themselves to stand out. They dropped the name when they had new management and replaced it with "Vinyl Theatre", stating that the vinyl aspect meant "When you buy a record on vinyl, it’s often for a band you’re truly dedicated to..." and "theatre" represented the theatrics of music.

With their name, members, and management being settled, the band began collaboratively writing songs and began putting them on social music sharing site, SoundCloud. There, they released their first song, "Breaking Up My Bones", which received large amounts of feedback from around the world. Looking back, the band realized that the combination of the site's only weeks-old "trending" feature and self-promotion on other social media networks was what provided them with so much feedback.

=== Fueled by Ramen and touring (2014–2016) ===
In March 2014, the band was put on Billboard's Next Big Sound Chart and was also announced to the setlist of Summerfest's Emerging Artist Series to take place in July of that year. New York City-based record label Fueled by Ramen, which has bands such as Paramore and Twenty One Pilots on their roster, picked up on the attention that Vinyl Theatre was receiving and contacted the band to ask for a performance. People from the label flew out to Milwaukee and watched the band perform in their practice space, which was also Nick Cesarz's basement. On August 19, 2014, Vinyl Theatre announced via their Facebook page that they had just been signed to Fueled by Ramen and that their first album, Electrogram would be released on September 23, 2014.

On the same day of their signing announcement, Vinyl Theatre announced that in the fall of 2014 they would be the opening band for their labelmates Twenty One Pilots along with indie-pop band Misterwives. After the tour finished, the band embarked on their first ever headlining tour across six states.

Vinyl Theatre announced that they would be touring with Magic Man and Smallpools. They also announced that they would tour with The Mowgli's, following with their Alter the Sound tour.

In February 2016, it was announced that bassist Josh Pothier parted ways with the band due to ongoing health issues.

=== Origami (2016-2017) ===
Vinyl Theatre had been in the studio recording new material for a sophomore record as early as early-mid 2016. Throughout the following year, they continued to tease new material via each of their respective social medias. In December 2016, they announced that they would support rock band Dashboard Confessional on their dates for their early 2017 U.S. tour. On January 13, 2017, they performed at a headlining show in their hometown of Milwaukee, Wisconsin, at local concert venue The Rave / Eagles Club and premiered their new record in its entirety live. On February 9, 2017, the band released the tracks "30 Seconds", "New Machines", "My Fault", and "The Island" as a preview for their upcoming album, with "30 Seconds" being the lead single. The album titled Origami and was released on May 5, 2017. In September, they toured with Smallpools and Misterwives in the 'Connect the Dots' tour.

The band has since parted ways with label Fueled by Ramen. On October 4, the band released a new song, "Me, Myself, and I", as a standalone single.

=== Starcruiser (2018–2020) ===
Their next independent single, "Feel It All", was released on March 2, 2018. The band toured with Vesperteen throughout March and April of that year. On July 13, the band released their second single of the year "Masterpiece". They announced the Starcruiser Tour for September and October on July 31, followed a week later by the announcement of their third studio album "Starcruiser" set for release on August 31.

On May 4, 2019, lead vocalist and guitarist Keegan Calmes announced on Twitter that he would be parting ways with the band, though the band itself may still continue.

=== Reunion (2021-present) ===
On September 17, 2021, The band announced on Twitter that lead vocalist and guitarist Keegan Calmes was rejoining the band.

A new single titled "Love You To Death" was released on May 27, 2022. A second single titled "More Than Friends" was released on August 18, 2023, along with the next single that was released on October 13, 2023 titled “Blisters.”

== Band members ==
=== Current ===
- Keegan Calmes - lead vocals, guitars (2009–2019, 2021–present)
- Chris Senner - keyboards, synthesizers, piano, programming (2009–present)
- Nick Cesarz - drums, percussion (2009–present), bass (2017-present)

=== Former ===
- Josh Pothier - bass guitar (2009–2016)

== Discography ==
=== Albums ===
- Electrogram (2014, Fueled by Ramen)
- Origami (2017, Fueled by Ramen)
- Starcruiser (2018, Independent/Outerwave Records)

==== Compilation Albums ====
- Time Capsule (2022, Independent)

=== EPs ===
- Gold (2013)
- Chromatic (2014, POST/POP RECORDS)

=== Singles ===
List of singles, with selected chart positions
Year	Single	Peak chart positions	Album
Year	Single	US Emerging Artists	Album
2013	"I Need You Here"	—	—N/a
2013	"Summer"	—	Electrogram
2013	"Tokyo"	—	Gold - EP
2014	"If You Say So"	—	Electrogram
2014	"Take Me Home"	—	Chromatic - EP
2014	"Breaking Up My Bones"	46	Electrogram
2017	"30 Seconds"	---	Origami
2022	"Love You to Death"	---	
2023	"More Than Friends"	---	
2025	"Insomnia"	---	
"—" denotes releases that did not chart

=== Music videos ===
Year	Song	Album
2013	"I Need You Here"	—N/a
2014	"If You Say So"	Electrogram
2014	"Breaking Up My Bones"	Electrogram
2015	"Gold"	Electrogram
2016	"Shine On"	Electrogram
2017	"30 Seconds"	Origami
2018	"Feel It All"	Starcruiser
2019	"Thank You For The Good Times"	Origami
