= Ann Beretta =

American punk band

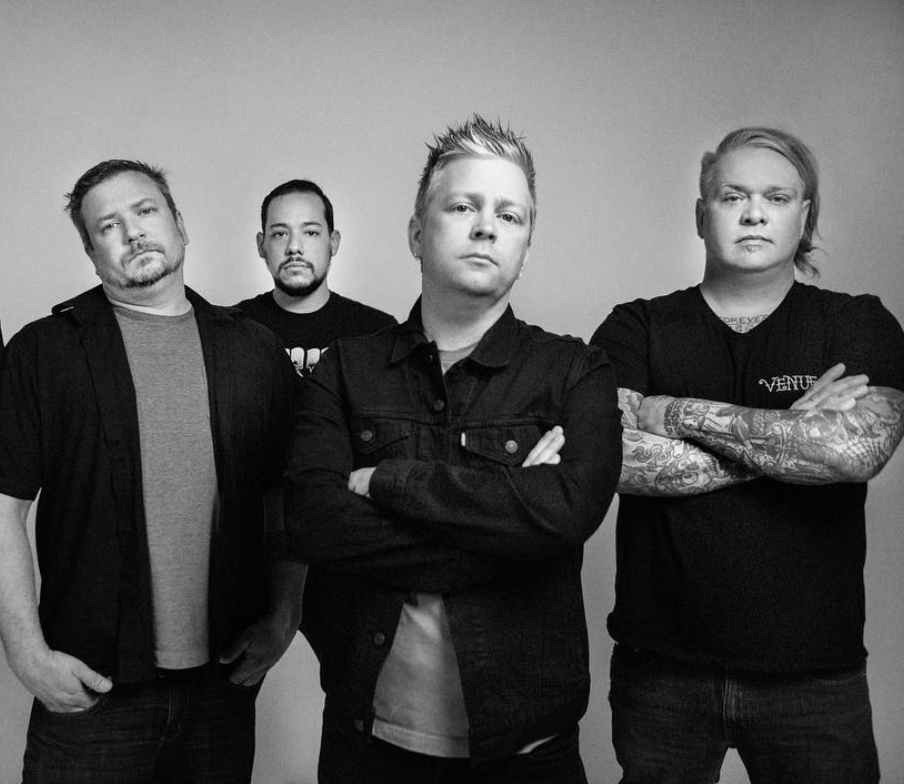

Background information
- Origin: Richmond, Virginia, U.S.
- Genres: Punk rock, rock
- Years active: 1996–2023
- Past members: Rob Huddleston; Leer Baker; Chris Rupp; Russ Jone

Ann Beretta was an American punk rock band from Richmond, Virginia. Formed in 1996 by Rob Huddleston, Leer Baker, Chris Rupp and Russ Jones (Baker and Rupp later left), the band plays straightforward punk with small doses of rockabilly and country mixed into their sound.

The band spent several years on tour playing with bands including Hot Water Music, ALL, The Bouncing Souls, Less Than Jake and city-mates Avail. They have released albums on Fueled by Ramen and Lookout! Records. However, after their 2001 release New Union Old Glory, they left Lookout! to release their next album on with Canadian label Union Label Group. In late 2004, Ann Beretta disbanded until 2012, when they toured Europe and the UK in support of Wild, Young, and Free – an LP released exclusively in Europe by Gunnar Records and made up of demos and outtakes. Since then, the band has only played occasional festival dates or local shows in their hometown of Richmond, Virginia.

In 2017 Ann Beretta released the album, Old Scars New Blood, a collection of re-recorded songs that spanned the band's career, representing each album previously released. In 2020 the band planned to record their first album of new material since 2003. The band played their final show, in Richmond, in June 2023.

== Band members ==
- Rob Huddleston (guitar/vocals)
- Donovan Greer (bass)
- Russ Jones (drums)
- Pedro Aida (lead guitar)

=== Former members ===
- Danny Vandiford (bass)
- Leer Baker (guitar/vocals)
- Chris Rupp (bass)
- Matt Bedford (bass)
- Andrew Clarke (keys)

== Discography ==
Studio albums

- Bitter Tongues (Fueled by Ramen, 1998)
- The Other Side of the Coin (Whitehouse Records, 1999)
- To All Our Fallen Heroes (Lookout!, 1999)
- New Union Old Glory (Lookout!, 2001)
- Three Chord Revolution (Union 2112 Records, 2003)
- Wild, Young and Free (Outtakes, Demos, Rarities 1997–2012) (Gunner Records, 2012)
- Old Scars, New Blood (Say 10 Records, 2017)
- Rise (self-released, 2022)

Live albums

- ...And the Band Played On – Live at Home (Raw Power Records, 2000)
- Live from CBGB's – July 5, 2003 (digital-only self-released, 2020)
- Like a Riot!: Live from the Broadberry (Acoustic) (digital-only self-released, 2020)

EPs

- Nobody's Heroes EP (self-released, 1996)
- Burning Bridges EP (Fueled by Ramen, 1999)
- New Union... Old Glory (split with Newtown Grunts – Wakusei Records/Speedowax Records, 2001)
- In ReCOVERy (split with Blacklist Royals – self-released, 2022)

Singles

- "Burning Bridges" (Fueled by Ramen, 1998)
- "The Shakes/Wild, Young, and Free" (Speedowax Records, 2015)
- "The Shakes (Kill the Lights)" (Say 10 Records, 2017)
