= A Frank Exploration of Voyeurism and Violence =

Studio album by Kane Hodder
- Released: March 23, 2004
- Recorded: 2003
- Genre: Melodic hardcore, Indie rock
- Length: 27:56
- Label: Cowboy Versus Sailor; Suburban Home Records
- Producer: T Dallas Reed

A Frank Exploration of Voyeurism and Violence was Kane Hodder's first EP. The album was released in 2004 on Suburban Home Records.

== Track listing ==
1. "Aboard The Leper Colony"
2. "Simona Checks Betty's Corpse"
3. "Attack On Tir Asleen"
4. "The Duke Has Died and Cancer Has Killed Him"
5. "Queen of Suburban Legend"
6. "David Lo Pan Versus Jack Burton"
