= Powerspace =

American power pop band

- Origin: Chicago, United States
- Genres: Power pop
- Years active: 2003–2010
- Label: Fueled by Ramen
- Past members: Alec Cyganowski; Tommy English; Kevin Kane; Dan McMahon; Max Perenchio

Powerspace was a four-piece power pop band from Chicago, Illinois. They were signed to Fueled by Ramen. The band released their debut album, The Kicks of Passion produced by Marc McClusky, on July 31, 2007.

== History ==
The band first began performing while students at Miami University. Chicago native guitar player Tommy English and fellow Miami student and Green, Ohio drummer Kevin Kane who had played in another band on campus, were joined on bass by Daniel McMahon, a friend of Schleiter’s from when they both attended St. Viator High School in Arlington Heights, Illinois. After a search for a vocalist, another Miami student and friend, Alec Cyganowski joined the group. The band began touring and developed a reputation for energetic live shows, sparking a large amount of interest from record labels. The band moved back to Chicago and signed to Fueled By Ramen Records, who released their first full-length, The Kicks of Passion, on July 31, 2007. A spot playing at SXSW and nationwide touring ensued in the US in 2007, opening for Hawthorne Heights, Amber Pacific, Monty Are I, Melee, From First to Last, and The Red Jumpsuit Apparatus. Most recently, the band's single "Powerspace Snap Bracelet" was featured in SPIN, who also reviewed their album, and the band was profiled in Aquarian magazine. The band has toured with The Classic Crime, Envy on the Coast, Kaddisfly, Madina Lake, Mayday Parade, Brighten, We The Kings, and at PunkSpring in Tokyo Japan in support of the album.

In January 2008, Tommy English took a temporary leave from Powerspace to complete his degree at Miami University. Guitarist Max Perenchio filled in while Schleiter was attending college. He rejoined the band to play in Tokyo at PunkSpring, and after graduation.

Starting on April 16, 2008 and ending on the morning of April 17, several of the guys took part in an all night chat on the forum, absolutepunk.net. Along with fans that stayed all night, they broke the previous record, held by The Audition, for most posts in a news thread, with over 5100 replies over about 8 hours.

On May 20, 2008, McMahon announced his decision to leave the band. He was replaced on tour by Jake Serek.

Powerspace was scheduled to release a full length record titled American Machine in early 2010 but on February 17, 2010, Powerspace officially broke up before releasing their new album.

The breakup letter was quoted as saying, "Powerspace as everyone knows it is 100% gone, and speaking about it in the past tense is still a very new thing for me, but for these guys to give up music entirely would be a crime. And they're not, and I'm not, and that's about all I can say. So keep tabs."

== Members ==
- Alec Cyganowski - Lead Vocals
- Tommy English - Guitar
- Kevin Kane - Drums
- Daniel McMahon - Bass

== Discography ==
=== Albums ===
- 2006: Houston, We Have a Party (EP)
- 2007: The Kicks of Passion (album)
- 2010: American Machine (album) (unreleased)

=== Singles ===
- "Right On, Right Now" 2007
