= Ghost Town (band) =

American electronic rock band

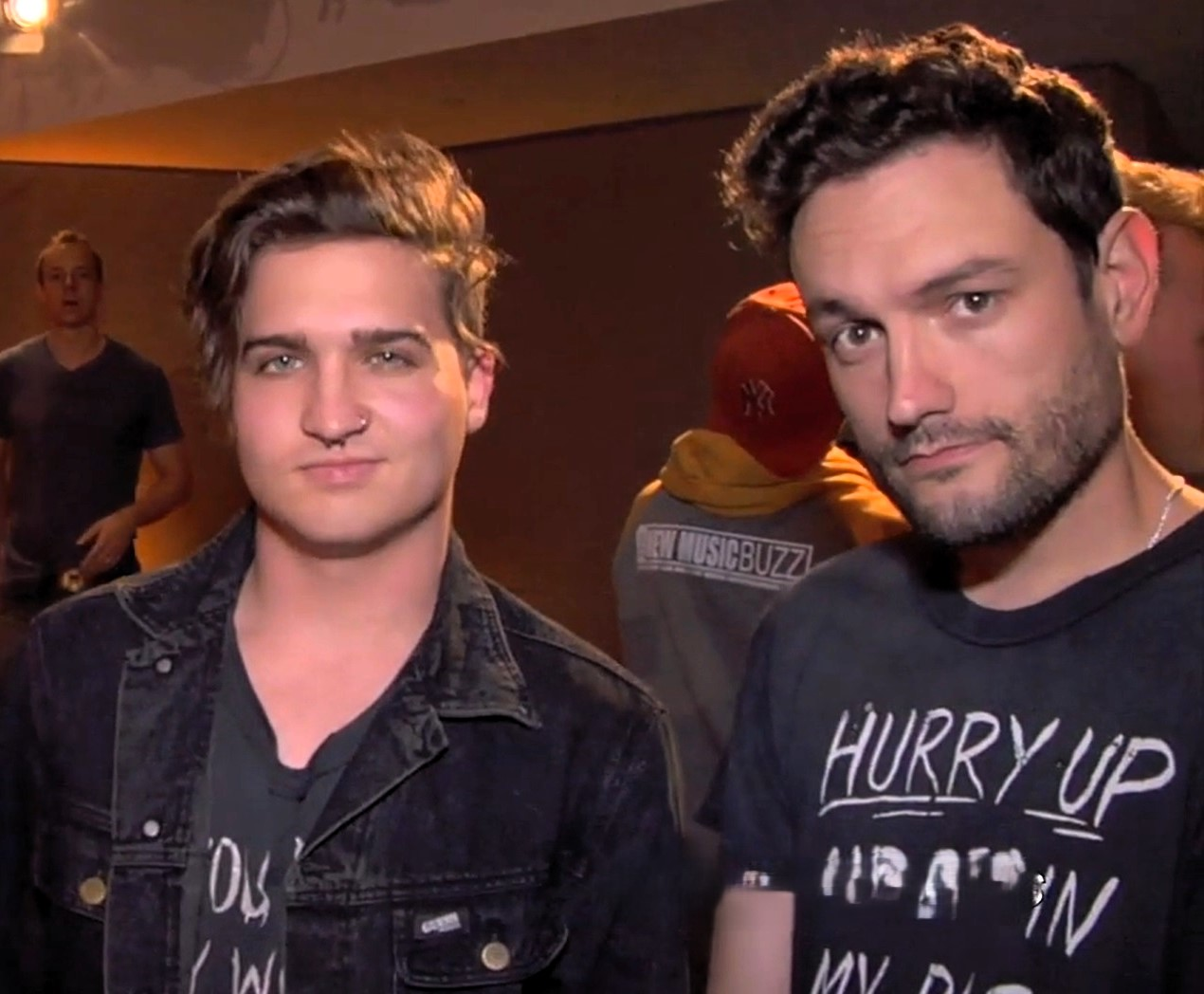
- Kevin McCullough (left) and Evan Pearce in 2014

Background information
- Origin: Los Angeles, California, United States
- Genres: Electronic rock; electronicore
- Years active: 2012–2018, 2026–present
- Label: Fueled by Ramen
- Members: Kevin "Ghost" McCullough; Evan Pearce
- Past members: Alix "Monster" Koochaki; Manny Dominick; Zachary LeCompte-Goble

Ghost Town is an American electronic band from the Hollywood neighborhood of Los Angeles, California. The band formed in September 2012 and was signed to Fueled by Ramen in 2013.

The band is made up of vocalist Kevin "Ghost" McCullough and keyboardist Evan Pearce, who left the band for a short period of time beginning in 2015, just a few weeks before the release of their album Evolution. He returned late 2016. From the group's foundation in 2012 until 2017 the band also included drummer MannYtheDrummer and guitarist/backing vocalist Alix Koochaki.

Alister Dippner creates artwork for the band's releases and is closely associated with them. Ghost Town Tuesday, or GTT, is an event that lasts over the course of a few weeks each round, and the band releases songs every Tuesday. The band has released three albums, Party in the Graveyard, The After Party, and Evolution, as well as two acoustic EPs, Bare Bones and Tiny Pieces. The After Party charted at No. 135 on the Billboard 200 and reached No. 1 on Billboard Top Heatseekers chart.

== History ==
=== Formation and Party in the Graveyard (2012–2013) ===
Kevin McCullough, Alix Koochaki, and Alister Dippner all attended high school together in Palm Springs, California. Kevin moved to Hollywood, CA and started Ghost Town with Zachary LeCompte-Goble. They added producer Evan Pearce and drummer Manny Dominick after a few months. After high school, Alister moved to San Luis Obispo to follow his passion for painting. Still being friends, Kevin sent him rough cuts of Ghost Town's first songs. Alister listened to them and replied, "This is like my art as music. I want nothing more than to be a part of whatever you guys make."

On September 4, 2012, Alister Dippner uploaded a sped-up video of himself painting the artwork to "Game Freak" with the song playing in the background, and it went viral. They set up a PureVolume page shortly after and rose to the top of the site's charts.

After the release of "Game Freak", the band decided to write, produce, and release a new song every week, dubbing them "Ghost Town Tuesdays". They released 12 songs over the course of 9 weeks.

Using many of the songs released over the course of four months, along with five new songs, the band self-released their first album, Party in the Graveyard. The band uploaded a version of the album onto YouTube on December 21, 2012. The full album was available on iTunes on January 15, 2013.

=== Record deal, Party in the Graveyard re-release and The After Party (2013–2014) ===
On May 7, 2013, the band announced that they were being signed to Fueled By Ramen and joining a tour with Marianas Trench and Air Dubai.

Following the success of the tour, Fueled By Ramen announced the re-release of their debut album. The re-release featured new artwork, remastered recordings, and the addition of four tracks. This was released on Fueled By Ramen on November 19, 2013.

Their second album, The After Party, was announced by the band on May 6, 2014. It was released on June 10, 2014, on Fueled By Ramen. It featured 10 new songs and a new version of "You're So Creepy". Following the announcement, a music video for "You're So Creepy" was released.

The After Party debuted at #1 on the Billboard Top Heatseekers charts and was featured in Rock Sound's 50 Best Albums of the Year for 2014.

=== Departure of Evan and Evolution (2015–2016) ===
In July 2015, Pearce announced his departure from Ghost Town due to undisclosed health reasons. In the press release, the band announced they would continue as a trio. Pearce is now back with Ghost Town as of 2017.

The band's third album, Evolution (stylized as EVØLUTION) was announced on their Facebook page on September 10, 2015. The next day, they released a music video for the first single off the album, "Spark". "Spark" was later released as a single on October 16, 2015. The album was recorded at Pulse Studios in Spring of 2015 with Josh Abraham, Nico Stadi, Oligee, and Ryan Williams over a span of 6 weeks.

The album, according to McCullough, has a different message than the band's previous works.

"In the past we've written a lot of songs about very specific relationships or very specific situations that people go through. This is a broader spectrum. The message has to do with people opening their eyes and not being so tunnel-visioned. Don't do the first thing someone tells you to do just because it seems like the easiest thing to do. It's not about what you wear, or how many people follow you, or how you look. It's about creating a community of like-minded people and accepting everyone.

— Kevin McCullough

The second single off of the album, "Mean Kids", focuses on the subject of bullying. On October 22, 2015, "Loner" was available for preview in an article on Billboard. The band called this song "the loner anthem for our generation." A music video for "Loner" was released alongside the album on November 6, 2015.

=== Lineup change and "In The Flesh" (since 2016) ===
In 2016, the band opened for Simple Plan on their European tour and played on the entire Warped Tour. Throughout 2016 they released a few singles digitally.

In August 2016 Ghost Town performed at Reading and Leeds Festival for the first time. To celebrate Halloween, they released a new song entitled "Tiny Pieces".

In 2016, Ghost Town covered the My Chemical Romance song "Mama" for a Rock Sound tribute CD.

On December 20, 2016, the band announced on their official Facebook account that Evan Pearce had returned to the band. Since his return, Ghost Town has released 5 new songs, four of which were released once per week on Ghost Town Tuesday during January 2017.

In April 2017, guitarist Alix Koochaki left the band. Five months later, on September 19, drummer Manny Dominick (professionally known as MannYtheDrummer) posted a statement on his Instagram announcing his departure from Ghost Town. Dominick would later join Capture.

On December 25, 2017, the song "Hell" was released as the first single for a new EP. Later on February 13, 2018, the second single "Modern Tragedy" was released. Finally, the new EP entitled "In The Flesh" was released on June 29, 2018.

== Band members ==
Current members

- Kevin McCullough (Ghost) – lead vocals (2012–present)
- Evan Pearce Glasson – guitar, bass, drums, percussion, backing vocals (2017–present); keyboards, synthesizers, samples (2012–2015, 2016–present)

Former members

- Alix Koochaki (Monster) – guitar, bass, backing vocals (2012–2017)
- Manny Dominick (MannYtheDrummer) – drums, percussion (2012–2017)

== Discography ==
=== Albums ===
==== Studio albums ====
- Party in the Graveyard (2013)
- The After Party (2014)
- Evolution (2015)

==== EPs ====
- Bare Bones (2013)
- Tiny Pieces (2016)
- In The Flesh (2018)

=== Singles ===
- "Game Freak" (2012)
- "Zombie Girl" (2012)
- "Ghost in the Machine" (featuring Chris Shelley) (2012)
- "Monster" (2012)
- "Massacre" (2013)
- "Trick or Treat Part 2" (2014)
- "Spark" (2015)
- "Mean Kids" (2015)
- "Loner" (2015)
- "Out Alive" (2015)
- "These Illusions Are My Latest Addiction" (2016)
- "American Outcast" (2016)
- "Paranormal Love" (2016)
- "Fan Girl" (2016)
- "Tiny Pieces" (2016)
- "Find Myself" (2016)
- "Twin Flame" (2017)
- "Low" (2017)
- "Broken" (2017)
- "You Don't Know Me" (2017)
- "Heroin" (2017)
- "Hell" (2017)
- "Modern Tragedy" (2018)

=== Compilation appearances ===
- "Mama" (2016)
  - My Chemical Romance cover on Rock Sound Presents: The Black Parade album

== Music videos ==
- "You're So Creepy" (2014)
- "Spark" (2015)
- "Loner" (2015)
- "Mean Kids" (2016)
- "Hell" (2017)
