= Cadillac Blindside =

Punk rock band from Minneapolis

- Origin: Minneapolis, Minnesota United States
- Genres: Punk rock
- Years active: 1997–2002, 2016, 2025
- Labels: Soda Jerk, Fueled by Ramen
- Past members: Zachary Zrust; James Russell; Trent Raygor; Rebecca Hanten; Annie Holoien; Bryan Edmison; Stefon Alexander

Cadillac Blindside was a punk rock band from Minneapolis, Minnesota, United States.

== History ==
Cadillac Blindside formed in 1997. They were a punk rock group, which shared, according to AllMusic biographer MacKenzie Wilson, "indie rock qualities similar to the likes of At the Drive-In, the Get Up Kids, and the Dillinger Four." The band composed of Zachary Zrust (vocals, guitar), James Russell (vocals, guitar), Trent Raygor (bass), and Rebecca Hanten (drums). Their debut album, Read the Book Seen the Movie, was released in late 2000 by Soda Jerk.

They were signed to Fueled by Ramen of Gainesville, Florida. After releasing their most successful record, "These Liquid Lungs," in May 2002, the band broke up in July 2002, citing "reasons too numerous to mention." Zrust went on to form Fuel The Fire. Russell and Hanten went on to form The Cardinal Sin. Trenton went on to form Monarques.

The group reunited in 2016. They supported Motion City Soundtrack on their farewell tour.

== Discography ==
Albums

- Read the Book, Seen the Movie (2000)
- These Liquid Lungs (2002)

EPs, demos, splits

- Bubblecore cassette demo (1997)
- Rumors, Scandals and Burning Bridges 7 inch (1998)
- The Cops Are Here, Lets Split Split 7 inch with Amp 176 (1999)
- The Allegory of Death and Fame (EP) (2001)
