= The Friday Night Boys =

American rock band

- The band in 2008

Background information
- Origin: Fairfax, Virginia, United States
- Genres: Power pop, pop punk, electronica
- Years active: 2006–2010, 2017
- Label: Fueled by Ramen
- Past members: Andrew Goldstein; Mike Toohey; Robby Reider; Chris Barrett
- Website: https://www.facebook.com/thefridaynightboys/

The Friday Night Boys was an American rock band from Fairfax, Virginia. The band consisted of lead vocalist and guitarist Andrew Goldstein, guitarist and backing vocalist Mike Toohey, bassist Robby Reider, and drummer Chris Barrett. The band was signed to Fueled by Ramen and toured the U.S. and Europe in support of two EPs and a full-length album.

The band's five-song Fueled by Ramen debut, “That’s What She Said” was released on October 13, 2008. Their album Off the Deep End was released on June 9, 2009.

== History ==
=== Beginnings, “The Sketch Process” EP (2006-2008) ===
Originally started in 2006 as an outlet for Andrew Goldstein to release pop songs that were a stark departure from his progressive psychedelic rock band Aberdien as well as another band called My Favorite Highway. The Friday Night Boys’ lineup was finalized in early 2008 with fellow DC musicians Mike Toohey, Robby Reider, and Chris Barrett. Shortly after, the band self-released their debut EP “The Sketch Process,” which sold over 45,000 digital tracks and quickly drew the attention of Absolute Management. The band appeared on MTV’s Total Request Live on July 10, 2008, where they were interviewed and performed “Chasing a Rockstar.”

The band continued playing locally that summer and booked their first week-long tour that consisted of dates in New York City, Chicago, Lansing, and Ann Arbor. During their New York City stop at the Knitting Factory, the band showcased for John Janick who, at the time, was the head of Fueled by Ramen. Janick had been contacted by All Time Low’s Alex Gaskarth who had a longstanding relationship with the band’s members and had expressed interest in helping them get signed.

=== Signing To Fueled By Ramen, “That’s What She Said” EP (2008-2009) ===
On August 12, 2008, it was announced that the band had officially signed with Fueled by Ramen. Later that month, The Friday Night Boys joined Hit the Lights, Fireworks, and A Rocket to the Moon on the AC Slay Tour, covering the Midwest and mid-Atlantic.

The band relocated to a shared apartment in Harrisonburg, VA while Goldstein completed his last semester at James Madison University (JMU) to earn a psychology degree. The band performed at JMU’s fall concert with Boys Like Girls, Cute is What We Aim For, and Lights and continued to tour on the weekends. Shows performed during this time included dates on the “Compromising of Integrity, Morality, and Principles in Exchange for Money Tour” with All Time Low and The Maine, at the CMJ festival in New York City with 3OH!3 and Anthony Green, and opening a sold-out show with Angels and Airwaves at Rams Head Live! in Baltimore.

The band's five-song Fueled by Ramen debut, “That’s What She Said” was released on October 13, 2008.

In December, the band joined All Time Low on the “Christmahanakwanza” tour along with The Audition, Hey Monday, and Sparks the Rescue. The tour had multiple dates in PA, NY, CT, and concluded on December 28 in Baltimore.

In February 2009, they joined the “Almost Have a Tour Bus Tour” in Omaha, NE with Automatic Love Letter and A Cursive Memory. Later that month, they concluded the tour in Tampa, FL.

In March 2009, they embarked on “Guys, Guys, Guys Tour,” in Oklahoma, OK with Sing It Loud, The Morning Light, The Summer Set, and Artist Vs. Poet. The tour covered the full U.S. and included a stop at Bamboozle Left on April 4 in Irvine, CA where the band performed on the Saints & Sinners stage. The tour ended on May 2, 2009 in East Rutherford as part of the Bamboozle Festival at the Meadowlands Sports Complex where the band performed alongside No Doubt, Fall Out Boy, Demi Lovato, Third Eye Blind, Kid Cudi, Taking Back Sunday, and more.

On May 5, 2009, the band began the “Rockin’ Rodeo Tour” in Portland, ME with Forever the Sickest Kids (FTSK). The tour covered much of the northeast and mid-west before being cut short on May 17 in Omaha, NE due to a member of FTSK contracting Swine Flu.

=== “Off The Deep End” LP, music videos, soundtracks, touring (2009-2010) ===
The band moved to Los Angeles in January 2009 to begin work on their debut full-length album “Off the Deep End” with producer Emanuel Kiriakou at Chalice Studios. While working on their album, MTV dubbed the band “Rock Rookies of 2009,” and invited them to their Los Angeles studio for an interview to promote the upcoming LP.

In late May, The Friday Night Boys partnered with Jonathan Bregel to film a music video for their first single “Stuttering” at an overnight shoot in Connecticut. The song was included on the soundtrack American Pie Presents: The Book of Love.

On June 9, 2009, Fueled by Ramen released The Friday Night Boys’ debut full length “Off the Deep End”. The day after the release of “Off the Deep End”, the band began the eight-week long “Let's Make a Mess Tour” in Phoenix, AZ with Hey Monday and This Providence. The tour concluded on July 24 in Houston, TX.

On August 3, 2009, the band started the sold out “Hot Mess Across the US” tour in Columbus, OH supporting label mates Cobra Starship. The tour included a stop at the Troubadour in West Hollywood, CA on August 11, which was the release date of Cobra Starship's new album “Hot Mess”. The tour covered the U.S. and concluded on August 31 in Providence, RI.

On September 19, 2009, the band partnered with Steve “Stev-o” Jocz of Sum 41 in Los Angeles to film a music video for their single “Stupid Love Letter,” which was co-written with Benny Blanco. The song would appear on the When in Rome movie soundtrack. On September 25, 2009, the band embarked on their first overseas trip for a sold-out tour supporting All Time Low and The Audition. The tour covered much of the United Kingdom, Ireland, and Scotland. The band headlined an additional show at the London Underground on October 6. On October 15, 2009, the band began the Glamour Kills tour in Hartford with All Time Low, We the Kings, and Hey Monday. The tour concluded on December 6 in Philadelphia. In November 2009, the band released a re-recorded version of their ballad “Can’t Take That Away” on the soundtrack for The Sims 3: World Adventures.

On December 27, 2009, the band co-headlined Washington, DC's 9:30 Club with My Favorite Highway. On January 22, 2010 the band headlined the “Once it Hits Your Lips Tour,” with support from The Ready Set and Anarbor. The twenty-date tour covered much of the east coast and midwest. The tour concluded on February 13 in West Palm Beach, FL.

In April, the band returned to the United Kingdom for a co-headlining tour with There For Tomorrow.

Following their co-headlining UK run, The Friday Night Boys supported Sum 41 and AFI on the Give it a Name tour in mainland Europe and performed several shows in Germany with Story of the Year. The European tour concluded with a stop at the Groezrock Festival in Meerhout, Belgium, where the band headlined the Etnies stage.

In May, the band joined Cute is What We Aim For for a full US tour. The tour started in Cambridge, MA and ended in Cleveland, OH on June 19.

=== Breakup, other projects, 2017 reunion (2010–2017) ===
The band took the summer of 2010 off from touring and came to the decision that they could no longer make the band a priority. On October 8, 2010 Goldstein announced via Fueled by Ramen’s Tumblr site that the band had broken up.

On February 1, 2011, The Friday Night Boys released “Everything You Ever Wanted: The B-Sides” on Fueled by Ramen. The album contained early recordings, b-sides, and one new, unreleased song titled “Impossible”.

Goldstein went on to become a multi-platinum songwriter/producer in Los Angeles, where he currently resides. He has written and produced for such acts as Britney Spears, Linkin Park, Demi Lovato, Fifth Harmony, 5 Seconds of Summer, Ne-Yo, Celine Dion, Jason Derulo, Selena Gomez, and more. He is also a solo artist under the name FRND.

Toohey went on to perform in several projects, including L.A. dream-pop band Brett (Cascine) and D.C.-based female-fronted synth act Furniteur.

Reider moved to Boston and later Portland, ME. He started Bob Records in 2013 and continues to release music through this avenue. He currently plays drums in the instrumental/space rock project The Rococo Bang with his brother-in-law.

Barrett went on to produce and perform solo material.

The Friday Night Boys reunited in March 2017 for a performance at the South by So What Festival in Dallas, Texas.

== Discography ==
=== Studio albums ===
Title	Album details	Peak chart positions
Title	Album details	US
Off the Deep End	Released: June 9, 2009; Label: Fueled by Ramen, Photo Finish, ThePartyScene; Format: LP, CD, digital download, streaming	198

=== Extended plays ===
EP	Released date
So Friday Night, So Friday Tight EP	2007
The Sketch Process EP	Spring 2008
That's What She Said EP	October 14, 2008
