= The After Party (album) =

Studio album by Ghost Town
- Released: June 2, 2014
- Genre: Electronicore
- Length: 36:37
- Label: Fueled by Ramen
- Producer: Mike Green, Evan Pearce

Ghost Town chronology
Party in the Graveyard (2013)	The After Party (2014)	Evolution (2015)

Singles from The After Party
- 1. "Acid"; 2. "I'm Weird"; 3. "Carnival"; 4. "Under Wraps"; 5. "You're So Creepy"

The After Party is the second album by the American electronic rock band, Ghost Town. It debuted at No. 1 on the Billboard New Artists and Heatseekers charts in June 2014. The track "You're So Creepy" was also on their debut album, Party in the Graveyard.

== Track listing ==
No.	Title	Length
1.	"Acid"	3:26
2.	"I'm Weird"	2:50
3.	"Carnival"	3:47
4.	"That's Unusual (Jump)"	3:04
5.	"You're So Creepy"	2:54
6.	"Under Wraps"	3:34
7.	"Black Moon"	3:28
8.	"Hocus Pocus"	3:08
9.	"Dracula"	3:29
10.	"W.F.F."	3:21
11.	"I'm a Disaster"	3:39

== Personnel ==
=== Ghost Town ===
- Kevin "Ghost" McCullough – vocals, unclean vocals
- Alix "Monster" Koochaki – guitar, backing vocals
- Evan Pearce – keyboards, synthesizers
- Manny "MannYtheDrummer" Dominick – drums, percussion

=== Production ===
- Tom Coyne – mastering
- Serban Ghenea – mixing
- Mike Green – engineering, mixing, producer
- Mike Liguori – A&R
- Jim Monti – mixing
- Evan Pearce – engineering, mixing, producer
- Dave Rath – A&R
- Andy Serrao – A&R
