= Animal Chin =

American punk music group

- Origin: Minneapolis, Minnesota, United States
- Genres: Ska punk Pop punk Skate punk
- Years active: 1996–2000
- Labels: Fueled By Ramen, Kingpin Records, Kickflilp Records
- Members: Jamie Woolford - guitar, vocals Andrew Gruhn - bass, backing vocals B.J. Wuollet - drums
- Past members: Jeremy Tappero - drums, guitar Ronn Pifer - drums

Animal Chin was an American ska punk group from Minneapolis, Minnesota. The group was named after the 1987 skateboarding film, The Search for Animal Chin. They released their debut LP, All the Kids Agree, in 1997, and soon after signed to Fueled By Ramen, who pressed their EP The Ins & Outs of Terrorism! that same year. In 1999, Fueled By Ramen released the LP 20 Minutes from Right Now, but the group split up just before the album's release. Bassist Gruhn went back to finish college, lead singer Woolford went on to form The Stereo and drummer Wuollet joined the group Kill Sadie.

== Discography ==
- All the Kids Agree (Kingpin Records, 1997)
- The Ins & Outs of Terrorism! EP (Fueled by Ramen, 1997)
- A Compilation To Benefit Food Not Bombs Gainesville, FL 7-inch vinyl EP (Fueled by Ramen, 1997)
- 20 Minutes from Right Now (Fueled by Ramen, 1999)
