= This Providence (album) =

Studio album by This Providence
- Released: September 12, 2006
- Genre: Indie rock
- Label: Fueled by Ramen
- Producer: Casey Bates

This Providence chronology
Our Worlds Divorce (2004)	This Providence (2006)	The Bright Lights (EP) (2008)

Professional ratings
Review scores
Source	Rating
AbsolutePunk.net	(78%)
Allmusic	3/5 stars
Amazon.com	4/5 stars
Jesusfreakhideout	4/5 stars

This Providence is the second studio album by the band This Providence, released on September 12, 2006, by Fueled by Ramen.

== Track listing ==
No.	Title	Length
1.	"A Wolf in Sheep's Clothing"	3:11
2.	"Card House Dreamer"	2:37
3.	"Secret Love and the Fastest Way to Loneliness"	3:00
4.	"My Beautiful Rescue"	2:37
5.	"Losing Control"	4:14
6.	"...But What Will They Say?"	2:22
7.	"Anything Is Possible"	3:18
8.	"The Road to Jericho Is Lined with Starving People"	3:10
9.	"Walking on Water"	2:36
10.	"An Ocean Between"	2:49
11.	"The Pursuit of Happiness: The 1st Movement"	3:26
12.	"The Pursuit of Happiness: The 2nd Movement"	2:28

iTunes bonus track
No.	Title	Length
13.	"Patience"	3:48

== Charts ==
Chart (2006)	Peak position
US Heatseekers Albums (Billboard)	18
US Independent Albums (Billboard)	20
