= This Providence =

American alternative rock band

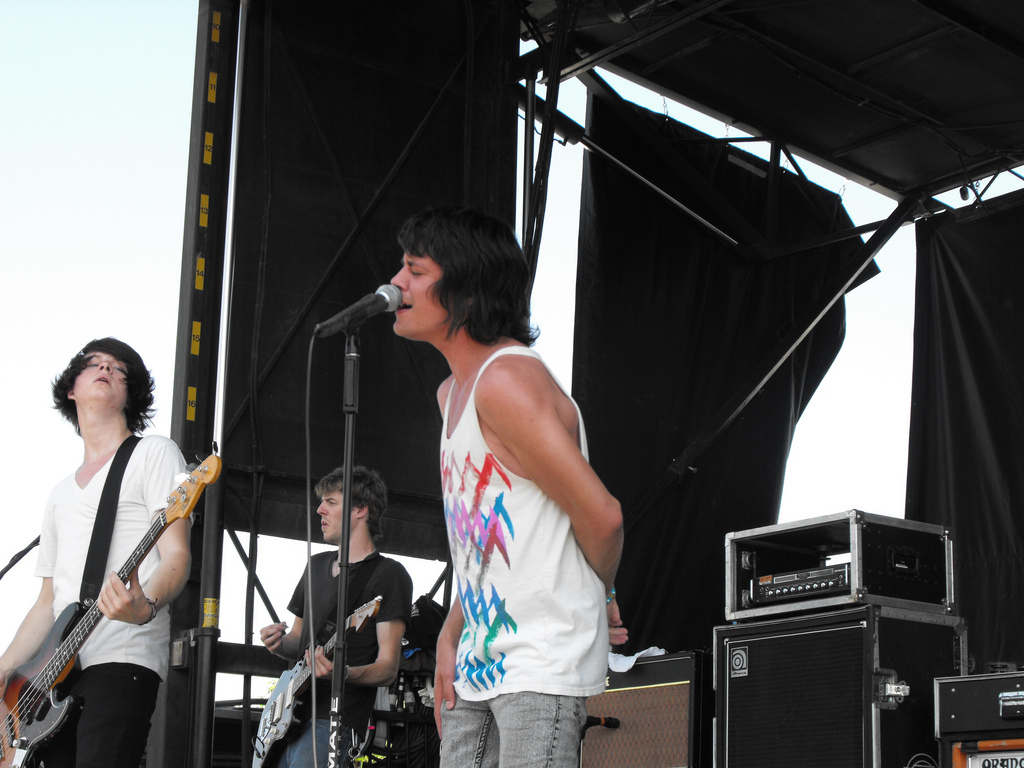
- Fresno 2009

Background information
- Origin: Seattle, Washington, USA
- Genres: Alternative rock, Indie rock Pop punk Emo
- Years active: 2003–2013
- Labels: Fueled by Ramen (2006–2012); Rocketstar Recordings (2004–2006)
- Past members: Daniel Young; Gavin Phillips; David Blaise; Andy Horst; Phil Cobrea; Paul Benson; Ryan Tapert; Sean Gasperetti
- Website: www.thisprovidence.com

This Providence was a four-piece alternative rock band from Seattle, Washington, United States. The band consisted of Dan Young (lead vocals/guitar), David Blaise (bass), Gavin Phillips (lead guitar), and Andy Horst (drums).

== Band history ==
=== Formation and early history ===
Daniel Young, Phil Cobrea, Gavin Phillips, and Paul Benson came together to form the band in 2003. Phillips and Young were in different pop punk bands in high school and came together when each dissolved. Young is Australian and was raised in Australia.

=== Our Worlds Divorce (2004) ===
While still in high school, the band gathered a strong following locally as well as some label attention. After graduating, they released their debut full-length record, Our Worlds Divorce, produced by Casey Bates.

In September 2005, This Providence announced that drummer Paul Benson was leaving the band to pursue new career paths, eventually with Apple Inc. The band and Benson parted on good terms and stay in contact on a regular basis. They also announced their new drummer, Ryan Tapert, and informed that he would be playing his first show with them in November at the Paradox in Seattle.

=== This Providence (2006) ===
Fueled by Ramen released This Providence's new self-titled full-length album on September 12, 2006. On November 1, 2006, Phil Cobrea announced that he would no longer be playing bass in This Providence. He cited "fractured relationships" and a "need to be around his family and girlfriend" as his reason for leaving. He left on friendly terms and claimed he will be around when This Providence plays shows in Seattle.

On November 3, 2006, This Providence announced that David Blaise, a Phoenix, Arizona native, had joined the band as the new bass player. On February 5, 2007, the band announced that they had changed from a 4-piece to a 5-piece. They enlisted the help of long-time friend Sean Gasperetti to play guitar and sing backup vocals. This allowed Young to be hands-free as the frontman.

This Providence have toured with Cute Is What We Aim For, Paramore, All Time Low, The Hush Sound, Daphne Loves Derby, Relient K, House of Heroes, Ludo and Brighten. They appeared at The Bamboozle 2007 on May 5, 2007.

They soon released their music video for "My Beautiful Rescue" with film director, Kevin CW Maistros. On June 19, 2007, This Providence officially announced Ryan Tapert's departure from the group.

The band toured with A Change of Pace, June, and Paulson in the summer of 2007. Whilst on tour with Daphne Loves Derby, The Higher, and The Reign of Kindo, they took the opportunity to announce their new drummer: Andy Horst.

=== Who Are You Now? (2009–2011) ===
On April 17, 2008, Sean Gasperetti announced his departure from the band. In the fall of 2008, the band released an EP on Fueled By Ramen, titled The Bright Lights EP. Throughout September 2008, This Providence was on the "Why So Serious?" US Midwest/West Coast tour, headlined by The Cab. Afterwards, they supported Relient K on their headlining tour with Ludo and House Of Heroes during the month of October and the beginning of November 2008.

In January 2009, the band was joined by touring guitarist Jake Van Paepeghem. On January 30, the band announced their third album entitled Who Are You Now? which was released March 17. Throughout February, the band supported Ludo on tour, along with Sing It Loud and The Morning Light.

They performed their song "Letdown" and had a video interview at the BETA Records TV Studios in Hollywood, California in the summer of 2009, directed by Eric MacIver and produced by Chris Honetschlaeger, which was posted online.

The band finished the Let's Make a Mess Tour in July 2009, which was headlined by Hey Monday. Other bands included on the tour were The Friday Night Boys, Stereo Skyline and The Bigger Lights. They also took part in Warped Tour 2009 during August. After Warped Tour, they went on tour with headliner Cartel, alongside The Summer Set, The Dares and Runner Runner. In the fall of 2009, This Providence announced that their new single from the album Who Are You Now? will be "Keeping On Without You". The music video premiered on November 10, 2009.

They performed at 106.1 KISS FM's Jingle Bell Bash on December 19, 2009. They next embarked on a tour with Motion City Soundtrack, Set Your Goals, and Fueled By Ramen label mates, The Swellers. The tour began on January 23, 2010 in Minneapolis, MN.

This Providence began their very first headlining tour in 2010, the "'Bout Damn Time" tour. Their opening acts included The Bigger Lights, Anarbor, The Audition and Artist Vs. Poet in some locations.

=== Brier and disbandment (2012–2013) ===
This Providence supported Go Radio on the Lucky Street tour and released their new EP, Brier (produced by Matt Grabe), on May 1. They recently diverged from their record label Fueled By Ramen.

At an acoustic house show on February 15, 2013, Dan Young confirmed that This Providence had disbanded.

In 2016, Dan Young released the first song he had recorded under the name Lonely Benson.

== Band members ==
=== Final lineup ===
- Daniel Young – vocals, guitar (2003–2013)
- Gavin Phillips – guitar (2003–2013)
- David Blaise – bass (2006–2013)
- Andy Horst – drums (2007–2013)

=== Former ===
- Phil Cobrea – bass/vocals (2003–2006)
- Paul Benson – drums (2003–2005)
- Ryan Tapert – drums (2005–2007)
- Sean Gasperetti – guitar (2007–2008)

== Discography ==
=== Albums ===
- Our Worlds Divorce (November 16, 2004) Rocketstar Recordings
- This Providence (September 12, 2006) Fueled by Ramen
- Who Are You Now? (March 17, 2009) Fueled by Ramen

=== EPs ===
- The Sunday Best (2003, re-released February 6, 2004)
- The Bright Lights (October 21, 2008) Fueled by Ramen
- Brier (May 1, 2012) Magic Mike Records
