= Kane Hodder (band) =

American rock band

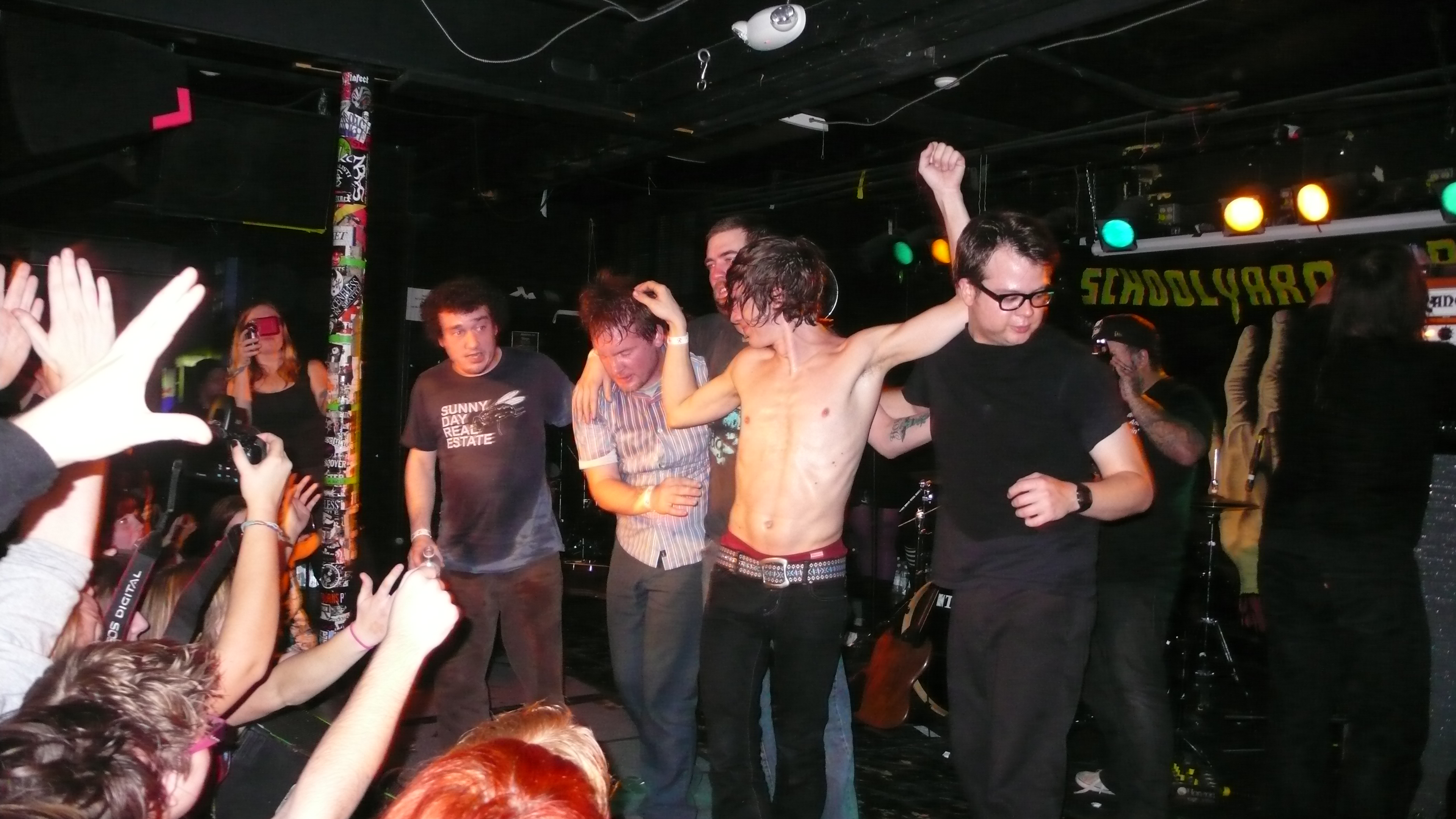
- Kane Hodder in 2009

Background information
- Origin: Bremerton, Washington, United States
- Genres: Melodic hardcore Hardcore punk Indie rock Post-hardcore
- Years active: 2002–2009, 2015
- Labels: Fueled by Ramen; Suburban Home; Fabtone (Japan); Art Box (Japan); Cowboy Versus Sailor; Music Abuse
- Past members: Andrew Moore; Eric Christianson; Charley Potter; Jerome Sauer; Aaron Yost; Jeremy White; Nick Cates

Kane Hodder was a hardcore/indie rock band formed in 2002, who also incorporates influences ranging from surf, 1960s soul, funk, and Latin lounge, among others. They remained in Fueled by Ramen's alumni for some time, despite having left the label in 2006.

Around the same time, original band members Jeremy White and Nick Cates left the band. They were replaced by Jerome Sauer and Aaron Yost, previously of the Kitsap County-based band Claymore.

The band is named after stuntman actor Kane Hodder, best known for portraying Jason Voorhees in the Friday the 13th series. The band asked permission from Hodder before naming their band such, which he granted.

The band broke up in 2009. Their last show was December 19, 2009 in Seattle, Washington. Eric, Jerome and Aaron went on to form the post-hardcore band Grenades the same year.

On February 7, 2015 Kane Hodder played an unannounced secret show in Bremerton, WA as part of a surprise bachelor party.

== Discography ==
Year	Title	Label
2008	Through The Bloody Channels, We Raise Our Sails EP	Independent
2007	Fly, Comet, Fly	Independent
2005	The Pleasure To Remain So Heartless Special Edition With DVD	Fueled By Ramen
2004	The Pleasure To Remain So Heartless	Suburban Home/Cowboy Versus Sailor
2004	A Frank Exploration of Voyeurism and Violence	Suburban Home/Cowboy Versus Sailor
