= The Stereo =

American pop and rock and roll band

- Genres: Pop rock, rock and roll
- Years active: 1999–2004, 2022-Present
- Labels: Fueled By Ramen
- Members: Jamie Woolford; Rory Phillips; Chris Serafini; Sam Hardwig

The Stereo is a pop-rock and roll band started in early 1999 by former ska-punk band frontmen Jamie Woolford (of Animal Chin) and Rory Phillips (of The Impossibles). The pair were initially brought together on recommendation of their record label Fueled By Ramen. The duo released their debut album Three Hundred in summer 1999.

Over their recording and touring history, the band endured a number of line-up changes. Singer-songwriter Woolford was always affiliated with the group and composed all selections on subsequent releases. The group disbanded in early 2004 with Woolford and bassist Chris Serafini reconvening to form the band Let Go.

In 2009, Alternative Press named Three Hundred one of the '10 most influential albums from 1999 that shaped Punk today'. In 2011, The Stereo briefly reunited with original members Phillips and Woolford to perform at Terminal 5 in New York City with Paramore, Fun, The Swellers and This Providence to celebrate the 15th anniversary of Fueled By Ramen. The Stereo also played 350 Fest 3: Back in Training in Tinley Park, IL on August 19, 2017.

On February 9, 2022, the band launched a Kickstarter to fund a new record, entitled "Thirteen", and an accompanying podcast series. The goal was funded in only 20 minutes. On February 18, they released the first single of the new record, "Kings Of No Hope."

== Discography ==
- Three Hundred [CD/LP] (Fueled by Ramen – June 22, 1999)
- New Tokyo Is Calling [CD-EP] (Fueled by Ramen – July 4, 2000)
- No Traffic [CD] (Fueled by Ramen – March 6, 2001)
- The Stereo/Ultimate Fakebook [split 7-inch single] (Popkid – December 1, 2001)
- Rewind + Record [CD/LP] (Fueled by Ramen – June 25, 2002)
- Thirteen [CD/LP] (Self-Release - 2022)
