= Let Go (band) =

American rock band

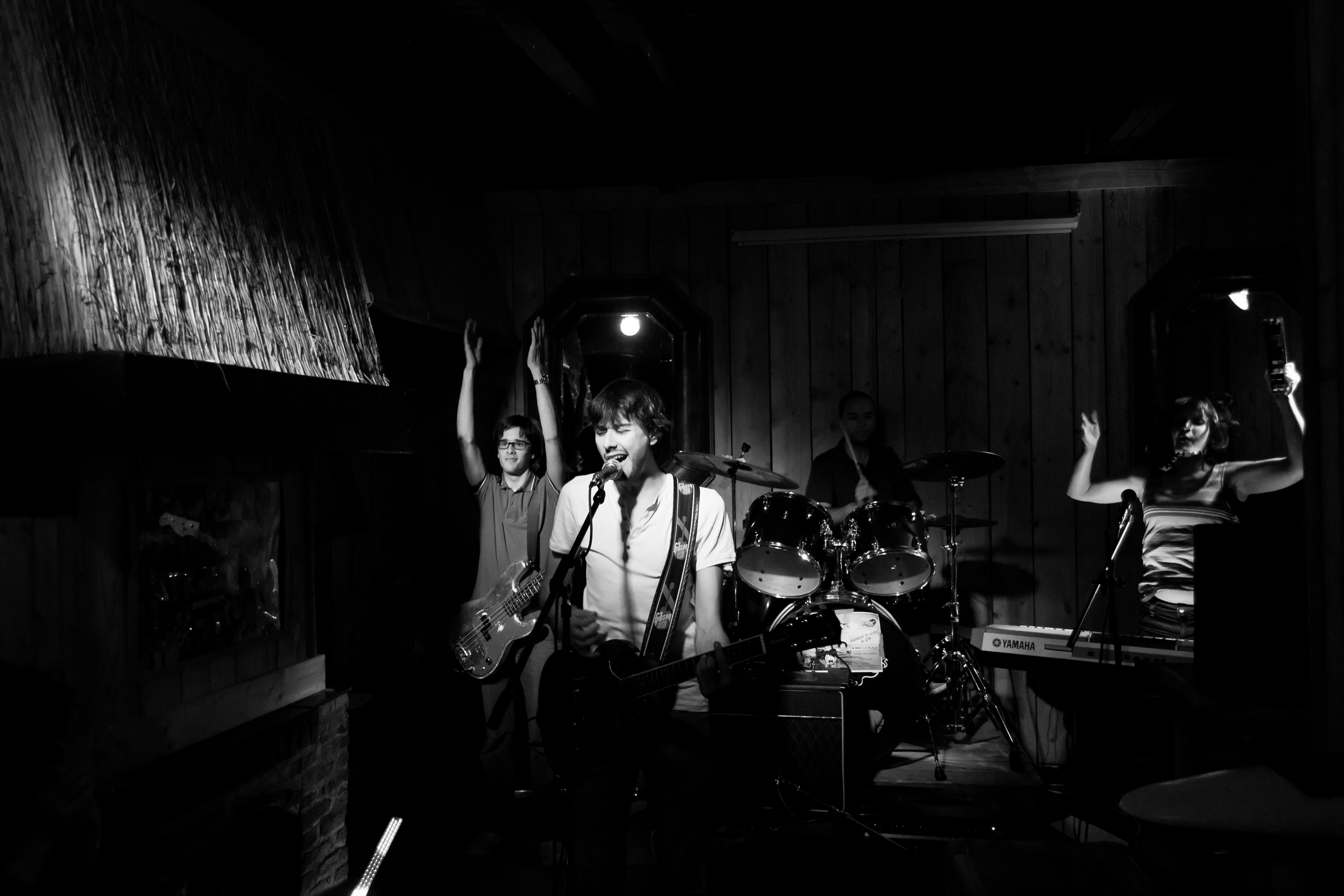
- Let Go performing at La Plage in Cap d'Agde, France, April 2012

Background information
- Origin: Tempe, Arizona, U.S.
- Genres: Indie rock; Power Pop
- Years active: 2004–present
- Labels: The Militia Group
- Members: Jamie Woolford, Chris Serafini, Scott Hessel
- Website: letgorock.com

Let Go is a rock band from Tempe, Arizona, formed in late 2004 and signed to southern California record label The Militia Group.

== History ==
Let Go was formed in late 2004 by The Stereo's Jamie Woolford and Chris Serafini. After the break-up of The Stereo, Woolford began working on solo material, and Serafini joined the band Gloritone, where he met drummer Scott Hessel, who later was asked to join Let Go. According to Woolford, he asked Serafini and Hessel to form the band when he wanted to fill out his new material. Serafini counters that after bonding with Hessel in Gloritone, his desire to start a new band began and the pair recruited Woolford.

Regardless of their origin, the trio produced the self-titled Let Go album over a month's time in Woolford's home studio, releasing it on The Militia Group in October 2005. Notable is the band employing use of an iPod during their live shows, both for a click track and as a sequencer.

The band has toured extensively in the United States and completed a tour in Japan in early 2006.

== Members ==
- Jamie Woolford (vocals, guitar)
- Chris Serafini (bass)
- Scott Hessel (drums)

== Discography ==
- Let Go (October 4, 2005)
- Analogies: The Story Changes/Let Go Split, (August 4, 2009) Future Destination Records
