= Fueled by Ramen =

American record label

Fueled by Ramen, LLC
- Parent company: Warner Music Group
- Founded: 1996; 30 years ago
- Founder: John Janick; Vinnie Fiorello; Mike Viola
- Distributors: Atlantic Music Group (US); Warner Music Group (International)
- Genre: Various
- Country of origin: United States
- Location: New York City
- Official website: fueledbyramen.com

Fueled by Ramen, LLC (formerly Fueled by Ramen, Inc. until 2005) is an American record label owned by Warner Music Group and distributed by Atlantic Music Group. The label, founded in Gainesville, Florida, in 1996, is now based in New York City.

== History ==
John Janick conceived of the label while attending high school, but it was not until he enrolled at the University of Florida in Gainesville and teamed up with Less Than Jake drummer-lyricist Vinnie Fiorello that Fueled by Ramen became a reality. The name of the label was inspired by only being able to afford a diet of inexpensive instant ramen at the time, due to having invested most of their money into making records.

Fueled by Ramen's first major success came in 1998 with the self-titled EP from Jimmy Eat World, which enabled the label to move from Janick's dorm room to an office space in Tampa.

Fueled by Ramen early on partnered with the independent distribution arm of Warner, ADA; Warner's Lyor Cohen finally made a deal for Fueled by Ramen that led Janick to say "We operate like an indie label that's very small and nimble and can do their own thing, but we have the resources of a major company."

In 2004, Fall Out Boy's Pete Wentz introduced Fueled by Ramen to fellow Chicago pop-rock outfit The Academy Is..., who released their debut album Almost Here, the following year. Soon thereafter, Janick joined forces with Wentz to create Decaydance Records and released a series of albums from a disparate-sounding group of acts ranging from the alternative hip hop of Gym Class Heroes to the indie-pop combo the Hush Sound. In September 2005, Decaydance and Fueled by Ramen released A Fever You Can't Sweat Out, the RIAA quadruple-platinum-certified debut album from Las Vegas' Panic! at the Disco.

In 2006, Vinnie Fiorello left the label, citing disagreements in the direction of future signees and loss of passion in the music the label was investing itself in.

In 2007, the label opened an office in midtown Manhattan, and that same year Paramore's album Riot! debuted in the top 20 of the U.S. Billboard 200, was certified gold and a year later gained platinum status. Panic! at the Disco's second studio album Pretty. Odd. achieved similar success, debuting at number 2 on the Billboard 200 charts, selling over 139,000 copies in its first week, and gaining platinum status. Later in 2016, Panic! at the Disco's fifth studio album Death of a Bachelor debuted at number 1, selling 196,000 copies in its first week, making it the fastest-selling album in the label's history.

In 2012, Fueled by Ramen signed musical duo Twenty One Pilots. They released their label debut album Vessel in 2013, which included "Ode to Sleep", "Holding On to You", "House of Gold", and "Car Radio". In 2015, they released their breakthrough studio album Blurryface, which included "Tear in My Heart", "Fairly Local", "Stressed Out", "Heavydirtysoul" and "Ride". The album peaked at number 1 on the US Billboard Top 200 charts, and was certified sextuple platinum after selling over 6 million copies in the U.S. alone. "Stressed Out" is the most viewed music video on Fueled by Ramen's YouTube channel, accumulating over 3.121 billion views as of Sep 22, 2025.

In June 2018, Warner Music Group announced that Fueled by Ramen, amongst other labels, would be included in a new parent label, Elektra Music Group. It officially launched on October 1, 2018. In June 2022, Elektra Music Group, and subsequently Fueled by Ramen, was merged into the new umbrella label group 300 Elektra Entertainment.

In October 2024, 300 Elektra Entertainment, and subsequently Fueled by Ramen, was merged into the new umbrella label Atlantic Music Group, though still retaining imprints on releases.

== Award certifications ==
Thirteen albums released by Fueled by Ramen have been certified Platinum (some multiple times) by the Recording Industry Association of America for sales of one million units or more:

- Some Nights (2012) by Fun
- A Fever You Can't Sweat Out (2005), Pretty. Odd. (2008), Too Weird to Live, Too Rare to Die! (2013), Death of a Bachelor (2016), and Pray for the Wicked (2018) by Panic! at the Disco
- All We Know Is Falling (2005), Riot! (2007), Brand New Eyes (2009), and Paramore (2013) by Paramore
- Vessel (2013), Blurryface (2015), and Trench (2018) by Twenty One Pilots

Blurryface, the label's highest-selling album, was certified sextuple platinum for sales of at least six million units; A Fever You Can't Sweat Out was certified quadruple platinum for sales of at least four million units; Some Nights and Riot! were certified triple platinum for sales of at least three million units; and Pray for the Wicked, Death of a Bachelor, and Vessel were certified double platinum for sales of at least two million units.

== Artists signed to Fueled by Ramen ==
This list was compiled based on information found on the Elektra Music webpage for Fueled by Ramen and the label's discography.

=== Notable artists ===
- A Day to Remember
- Fall Out Boy
- The Front Bottoms
- One OK Rock
- Rico Nasty
- Twenty One Pilots

=== Former artists ===
- 3OH!3
- The A.K.A.s
- The Academy Is...
- Against the Current
- Ann Beretta
- All Time Low
- Arizona
- Autopilot Off
- Basement
- Bigwig
- The Cab
- Chef'Special
- Cute Is What We Aim For
- Dashboard Confessional
- E^ST
- Flor
- Ghost Town
- Grandson
- Gym Class Heroes
- The Hush Sound
- The Impossibles
- Jimmy Eat World
- Less Than Jake
- Lifetime
- Lights
- Meet Me at the Altar
- MisterWives
- Nate Ruess
- Nothing,Nowhere
- Paramore
- Phantom Planet
- The Pietasters
- Punchline
- Rome
- Slick Shoes
- Sublime with Rome
- SWMRS
- Travie McCoy
- Waterparks
- Yellowcard
- Yonaka
- Young the Giant

==== Inactive ====
- Animal Chin
- Blueline Medic
- Boxcar
- Cadillac Blindside
- Cobra Starship
- The Causey Way
- Days Away
- Discount
- Forgive Durden
- The Friday Night Boys
- Frodus
- Fun.
- The Hippos
- Home Grown
- The Impossibles
- Jersey
- Kane Hodder
- Limp
- October Fall
- Oh Honey
- Panic! at the Disco
- Pollenj
- Powerspace
- Phantom Planet
- This Providence
- Rhythm Collision
- A Rocket to the Moon
- Roy
- Recover
- The Stereo
- The Swellers
- Teen Idols
- VersaEmerge
- Vinyl Theatre
- Whippersnapper

== See also ==
- List of record labels
- Fueled by Ramen discography
