= The Same Old Blood Rush with a New Touch =

Studio album by Cute Is What We Aim For
- Released: June 20, 2006
- Recorded: February 2006
- Studio: Salad Days, Beltsville, Maryland
- Genre: Pop punk; power pop; emo pop
- Length: 41:58
- Label: Fueled by Ramen
- Producer: Matt Squire

Cute Is What We Aim For chronology
The Same Old Blood Rush with a New Touch (2006)	Rotation (2008)

Singles from The Same Old Blood Rush with a New Touch
- 1. "There's a Class for This" Released: September 4, 2006; 2. "Newport Living" Released: February 5, 2007; 3. "The Curse of Curves" Released: April 9, 2007

The Same Old Blood Rush with a New Touch is the debut studio album by American rock band Cute Is What We Aim For. Following the band's formation in early 2005, they posted demos on Myspace and PureVolume. These demos soon garnered attention from record labels. After a period of time, the group received a call from major label Fueled by Ramen founder John Janick, who signed the band in November. In February 2006, the band began recording The Same Old Blood Rush with a New Touch with producer Matt Squire at Salad Days Studios in Beltsville, Maryland. During the album sessions, several of the demos the band had previously posted had been re-recorded. Prior to the album's release, "The Curse of Curves" was made available for streaming in March. Following the song's availability, the band went on a couple of tours in the U.S.

The Same Old Blood Rush with a New Touch was released on June 20 through Fueled by Ramen. The band went on multiple supporting tours following its release. "There's a Class for This" was released as a single in September. A month later, bassist Fred Cimato left the group, and was replaced by Jack Marin of October Fall. In early 2007, the band went on a UK tour, and released "Newport Living" as a single in February. Following this, the band went on a headlining tour across the U.S. in February and March. The group then co-headlined the Alternative Press tour with Circa Survive in March and April. In early April, Marin left the band, and was replaced temporarily by Cimato. Also in April, "The Curse of Curves" was released as a single. The band appeared at the 2007 edition of Warped Tour, and supported Fall Out Boy towards the end of the year.

The Same Old Blood Rush with a New Touch received mostly unfavourable reviews with several reviewers criticizing the album's lyrical content and comparing the band negatively to My Chemical Romance and Panic! at the Disco. The album peaked at number 75 on the Billboard 200 upon its release. It became Fueled by Ramen's fastest selling debut album and has since sold over 210,000 copies. "The Curse of Curves" peaked at number 191 on the UK Singles Chart. In 2013, the album was released on vinyl for the first time. In 2016, to celebrate the album's 10th anniversary, the band performed the album in full on tour.

== Background ==
Shortly after forming in January 2005, Cute Is What We Aim For began releasing demos through Myspace and PureVolume, which helped the band gain initial exposure. Guitarist Jeff Czum said their success was due to another band's street team: "The street team leader from Hawthorne Heights reposted it on Myspace. Literally overnight we got like 10,000 fans on Myspace and started to get attention from labels." In the following months, the group continued to record and play shows, increasing their fan base and declining advances from record labels.

In summer 2005, the band received a phone call from major label Fueled by Ramen founder John Janick, who wished to see the group perform live. The group had a meeting with Janick, before leaving to record demos in New York City. Eager to hear the material, Janick visited the group while they were recording in late July with Shep Goodman. On November 29, it was announced that the band had signed to Fueled by Ramen. Vocalist Shaant Hacikyan said of the label: "There's such an amazing sense of community about the label. ... From the outside looking in, I just wanted to be a part of it so bad." In December, the band mentioned that they were writing material for their debut album and were planning to record later in winter.

== Production and composition ==
Despite an Alternative Press news report shortly after signing with Fueled by Ramen that the band was recording, they did not start the album until February 2006. Recording took place at Salad Days Studios in Beltsville, Maryland. The group made a brief list of producers they wished to work with, the first being Matt Squire. One of the band's main reasons for wanting to work with Squire was the label's rapport with him as a result of the success of Panic! at the Disco's debut, A Fever You Can't Sweat Out (2005). Janick sent Squire a demo of "Teasing to Please (Left Side, Strong Side)." Shaant Hacikyan recalls Squire was "really excited about it. I knew right away that that we could make a great record together."

Hacikyan described Squire as "a guiding light. He has this confidence that he inspires in others. This record wouldn't be what it is without him." According to Squire, the group wanted to make a "very natural sounding record." As such, the band and Squire spent a "lot of time" working on pre-production. After finishing the pre-production process, drums were recorded. On previous records, Squire had used Beat Detective to keep drums "perfectly in time." However, for The Same Old Blood Rush with a New Touch Squire did not use it as he wished to "preserve the 'groove'" of Tom Falcone's drumming. After this, bass and guitars were recorded during the day, and vocals during the night. Squire purposefully staggered the instruments "so that every song [could] have a unique feel."

During the sessions, the band recorded "Finger Twist & Split," "Lyrical Lies" and "Teasing to Please (Left Side, Strong Side)" – all songs that had previously been released in demo form. Hacikyan said that the band initially wanted to "pull away" from the songs, but "at the same time, we understand that most people haven’t heard them yet." While preparing a mix, Squire would typically "trigger" the drums, a technique he uses to give the drums a thicker sound. However, the group was against the idea. Squire found it a "fun challenge" making the drums "sound punchy without them." Squire spent a few days doing a mixing draft of the album, with assistance from Paul Leavitt. Then he asked for feedback from both the label and the group. After incorporating the feedback, he finalized the mixes, and sent the album for mastering. Ue Nastasi mastered the recordings at Sterling Sound.

Discussing the album's title, Czum said: "we’re nothing ground-breaking [music-wise] but we just like putting our own touch on it". All of the music was written by Cute Is What We Aim For, while all of the lyrics were written by Hacikyan. Typically, when Hacikyan wrote lyrics he had a melody in mind, which the band fit the music around. Hacikyan described the album as being about "the everyday ins -and -outs of social cliques. It’s about the pressure that they put on you, to live up to something that you’re not, to be somebody that someone else wants you to be." The Academy Is... vocalist William Beckett provides guest vocals on "There's a Class for This," while All Time Low performed group vocals on "Teasing to Please (Left Side, Strong Side)" and "Sweet Talk 101." Hacikyan described Beckett as "definitely an idol of mine." Beckett was unable to come to the studio to record his part as he was on tour at the time. Instead, his part was recorded at the back of a tour bus and sent to the band.

== Release ==
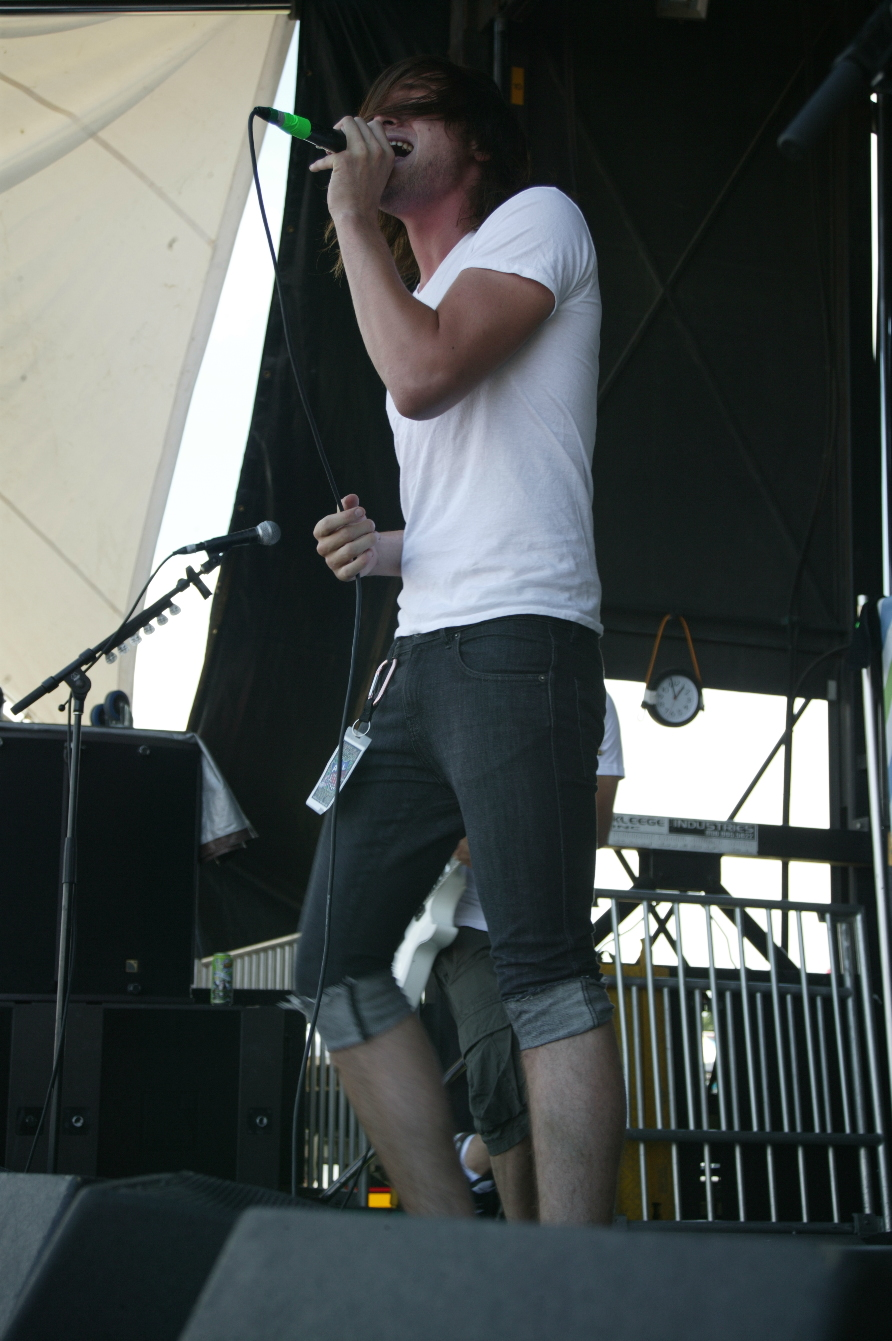
Shaant Hacikyan performing on Warped Tour, July 18, 2007

On March 22, 2006, the single "The Curse of Curves" was made available for streaming via the band's PureVolume account. In April, the band went on tour with labelmates Punchline, Valencia and New Atlantic, alongside the Audition and appeared at the HFStival. In June, the band went on a brief U.S. tour with Anberlin, Jonezetta, and Blackpool Lights. The Same Old Blood Rush with a New Touch was released on June 20 through Fueled by Ramen. The Japanese edition included an electric version of "Lyrical Lies" as a bonus track. A music video for "There's a Class for This," directed by Jay Martin, premiered on mtvU on July 17. In August and September, the band supported Paramore on their tour of the U.S. On September 4, "There's a Class for This" was released as a single. On September 18, the album was released in the UK. In October, the band performed a few headlining shows in the UK, before supporting Paramore on their UK tour.

On October 18, it was announced that bassist Fred Cimato had left the band to return to school. His position was filled by Jack Marin of October Fall. In October and November, the band supported Hellogoodbye on their tour of the U.S. In January and February 2007, the band toured the UK. On February 5, "Newport Living" was released as a single. From mid-February to mid-March, the band went on a headlining U.S. tour with support from This Providence and All Time Low. On February 26, the music video for "The Curse of Curves," directed by Lex Hallaby, premiered via AbsolutePunk. From mid-March to late April, the band co-headlined the Alternative Press tour with Circa Survive, with support from As Tall as Lions and Envy on the Coast.

On April 4, it was announced that Marin had left the band and been replaced by Cimato, who was filling in temporarily. A day later, Marin revealed that he was "having some personal issues with another member. I've tried to just ignore the problems, but the truth is, I'm just not happy at all." On April 9, "The Curse of Curves" was released as a single, before being released to radio on April 30. From late June to late August, the band went on the 2007 edition of Warped Tour. For the tour, Dave Melillo joined the band as an additional guitarist. From mid-October to early December, the band supported Fall Out Boy on their U.S. tour. A music video was released for "Newport Living" on October 31. On November 20, a MVI version of the album was released containing karaoke tracks for every song on the album, live performances, and bonus tracks.

== Critical reception ==
Professional ratings
Review scores
Source	Rating
AllMusic	2/5 stars
Drowned in Sound	3/10
Gigwise	2/10 stars
musicOMH	2/5 stars
PopMatters	6/10 stars
The Skinny	2/5 stars

The album's reception by reviewers was generally unfavorable. AllMusic reviewer Corey Apar wrote that the album "is basically a vapid product of the MySpace generation ... The whole album just seems so contrived and pointless that any sporadic moment of disposable hooky bliss is quickly overshadowed by annoying wordplay." Apar concluded by calling the album the musical equivalent of "an ironic trucker hat: even if it catches on with the masses for a time, that doesn't make it right." Ben Marwood of Drowned in Sound wrote that the album contained "little substance of any kind – emotional or otherwise." He went on to call the band "a low-rent" My Chemical Romance or "a lesser" Panic! at the Disco because of Hacikyan's vocals. FasterLouder writer Victoria Jack wrote that there were "some unique moments" on the record, noting the band's upbeat sound. Despite mentioning the group can be "more insightful," Jack said they "usually lack depth in their typical commentary on 'scenes' and 'cliques' and being a 'sell out'." Kate Parkin of Gigwise listed "Newport Living" and "There's a Class for This" as being "songs built for The O.C." Adding in songs about "High School tribulations and illicit snogging ... something is lacking." Parkin noted that the group was missing "the arrogant defiance" of My Chemical Romance and "the relentlessly catchy choruses" of Panic! at the Disco.

Writing for musicOMH, Tom Woods felt the album would "attract swarms of internet love, but this unstable foundation, built upon the fleeting dreams of thirteen year-olds" would restrict the band's lifetime. Woods compared the band to Panic! at the Disco "without the bounce or the creativity" saying the album "takes the bastardisation of honest musical forms to new heights." Dan MacIntosh of PopMatters felt the songs as "sound[ed] like high school gossip." He went on to note the album has: "Over-the-top drama" combined with "stripped-down, pop-rock hooks," which for the most part "prevent overbearing emotional mood swings." He concluded by mentioning the band has "much to say, but lacks the right words to say it all." The Skinny reviewer Billy Hamilton noted the album was "Brimming with slickly produced pre-pubescent punk-pop" that made "Blink 182 seem like nihilists." He considered the sound as being "faux-guitar music for a generation yet to move on from the tweeny-rock of Busted." In an artist spotlight for Spin, writer Alyssa Rashbaum described the album as "energetic, youthful power-pop about high school cliques, drama-loving girls, and fake IDs."

== Commercial performance and legacy ==
The Same Old Blood Rush with a New Touch debuted at number 75 on the Billboard 200 on its release, becoming the fastest-selling debut in Fueled by Ramen's history. "The Curse of Curves" reached number 191 on the UK Singles Chart. The song "There's a Class for This" was featured on EA Sports' NHL 07 video game. A month after its release, the album had sold over 28,000 copies. It has since sold over 210,000 copies.

In December 2014, the album was released on vinyl for the first time through independent label Enjoy the Ride. To celebrate the album's 10 year anniversary in 2016, the band went on tour performing the album in full. Hacikyan said: "Growing up, none of us thought we'd ever release a full length album, let alone have the chance to fly across the earth to headline a ten-year anniversary tour." The band initially went on an Australian tour in August, which they hoped would lead to interest in a U.S. tour. Following contact with promoter Chris Ring, the band was hired by him as the first partner for his company Fanbassador. Fanbassador allowed the band to map out cities they could play based on audience demand. Eventually, they performed the album in 33 cities across the U.S. in October.

== Track listing ==
All music by Cute Is What We Aim For, all lyrics by Shaant Hacikyan.

No.	Title	Length
1.	"Newport Living"	3:28
2.	"There's a Class for This" (featuring William Beckett)	3:36
3.	"Finger Twist & Split"	3:21
4.	"Risqué"	3:42
5.	"Sweat the Battle Before the Battle Sweats You"	2:52
6.	"The Fourth Drink Instinct"	4:09
7.	"Sweet Talk 101" (featuring All Time Low)	3:30
8.	"The Curse of Curves"	3:23
9.	"I Put the "Metro" in Metronome"	3:26
10.	"Lyrical Lies"	3:33
11.	"Moan"	3:09
12.	"Teasing to Please (Left Side, Strong Side)" (featuring All Time Low)	3:44
Total length:		41:58

Japanese bonus track
No.	Title	Length
13.	"Lyrical Lies" (electric version)	3:15

MVI bonus tracks
No.	Title	Length
13.	"Hipbones and Microphones"	3:11
14.	"Lyrical Lies" (electric version)	3:15

== Personnel ==
Personnel per booklet.

Cute Is What We Aim For

- Jeff Czum – guitar, piano, MIDI
- Tom Falcone – drums
- Fred Cimato – bass, guitar
- Shaant Hacikyan – vocals

Additional musicians

- William Beckett – guest vocals on "There's a Class for This"
- All Time Low – group vocals on "Teasing to Please (Left Side, Strong Side)" and "Sweet Talk 101"

Production

- Matt Squire – producer, mixing, engineer
- Paul Leavitt – assistant engineer
- Ue Nastasi – mastering
- Pale Bird Design Studio – art, layout

== Charts ==
Chart performance for The Same Old Blood Rush with a New Touch
Chart (2006–2007)	Peak position
Canadian Albums (Nielsen SoundScan)	81
Canadian Alternative Albums (Nielsen)	30
UK Rock & Metal Albums (OCC)	13
US Billboard 200	75
