= The Scene Aesthetic (album) =

Studio album by The Scene Aesthetic
- Released: July 10, 2007
- Recorded: Destiny Studios (Seattle, WA); The Tank Studios (Black Diamond, WA)
- Genre: Indie folk, emo pop
- Length: 57:28
- Label: Destiny Worldwide Records
- Producer: Brandon Metcalf; Tom Pfaffle

The Scene Aesthetic is the second album released by The Scene Aesthetic and is a re-release of their 2006 debut album, Building Homes from What We've Known. The album contains remastered and remixed versions of all of the tracks from their debut album plus three additional tracks.

The Scene Aesthetic was released on July 10, 2007.

== Track listing ==
No.	Title	Length
1.	"A Formal Introduction"	1:31
2.	"So Peter, You've Become a Pirate"	3:49
3.	"Alvin Maker's Greensong"	3:36
4.	"Don't Be That Note I Can't Hold"	3:11
5.	"Call It a Lullaby"	3:51
6.	"Yes, Even Stars Break"	4:03
7.	"The Alamo Is No Place for Dancing"	4:03
8.	"To the Steadfast"	4:29
9.	"Beauty in the Breakdown"	3:15
10.	"Yellow Birds & Coal Mines"	3:57
11.	"This Is a Suitable Valedictory"	4:37
12.	"Dear Time Traveler"	4:36
13.	"Heavy Lies the Crown"	4:12
14.	"We've Got the Rain on Our Side"	5:04
15.	"Beauty in the Breakdown" (Acoustic)	3:14

== Personnel ==
The Scene Aesthetic

- Andrew de Torres – guitar, vocals, harmonica, mandolin
- Eric Bowley – vocals, tambourine

Additional musicians

- Xavier McHugh – drums
- Nick Simmons – bass
- Robbie Cochrane (of Danger Radio) – guitar
- Brandon Metcalf – programming, percussion
- Spencer Mertel (of Danger Radio) – programming
- Nico Hartikainen (of Danger Radio) – programming
- Dan Young (of This Providence) – vocals on "We've Got the Rain on Our Side"
