= Rotation (Cute Is What We Aim For album) =

Studio album by Cute Is What We Aim For
- Released: June 24, 2008
- Recorded: January–March 2008
- Studio: Foxy, Los Angeles, California
- Genre: Pop punk; pop rock; emo pop
- Length: 39:06
- Label: Fueled by Ramen
- Producer: John Feldmann

Cute Is What We Aim For chronology
The Same Old Blood Rush with a New Touch (2006)	Rotation (2008)

Singles from Rotation
- 1. "Practice Makes Perfect" Released: May 5, 2008

Rotation is the second and final studio album by American pop punk band Cute Is What We Aim For, released on June 24, 2008.

== Background ==
Cute Is What We Aim For released their debut album The Same Old Blood Rush with a New Touch in June 2006 through major label Fueled by Ramen. Bassist Fred Cimato left the band in October and was replaced by Jack Marin. Marin subsequently left mid-tour in April 2007 and was replaced by Cimato. In late May, the band announced they would be writing and recording their next album in the fall, with the aiming of releasing it in late winter. In July, it was reported that the band had become a five-piece with the addition of Dave Melillo in time for the group's stint on Warped Tour.

While on the tour, vocalist Shaant Hacikyan was actively searching for a producer for the group's next album. Guitarist Jeff Czum messaged John Feldmann of Goldfinger through Myspace and linked him to the band's music. Feldmann responded months later and "we went from there" according to Hacikyan. Hacikyan was initially apprehensive of working with Feldmann "because it was a big move" after working with Matt Squire on their debut album. The rest of the group assured Hacikyan that Feldmann "was there to let us do whatever we wanted and he would back us up on it".

== Production ==
The band went into the pre-production process with half-written songs with Feldmann as the producer. When asked in an interview about choosing Feldmann, Hacikyan said he was a fan of Feldmann's past work. He added "there were plans for little details and ad libs under the record, and I knew John Feldmann is amazing at that". Explaining the half-written songs, Hacikyan said "There's something to be said for spontaneity, and I didn't want the songs written out when we got there". On occasion, the band would play a song and Feldmann "would just get up and walk away". The band would spend the hour that he was gone working on the track. Upon returning, the group would "ask him if he was impressed. It was like pleasing your parents because we just wanted him to be happy about what we were creating". The group found it difficult to work through the material, as Melillo explains: "It was between being nervous, unprepared and being in this new situation ... [Feldmann] was looking at us like, "What the fuck are you doing?""

The band returned to their residence, "kick[ed] ourselves in the ass, and we came back and we killed it", according to Melillo. The band subsequently went on a songwriting trip to Monterey Bay where they spent time with each other. According to Melillo the catalyst was when Hacikyan said "Dude, it could be like this all the time ... we're going to all these awesome places, why can't we make it like that?" Hacikyan said that the difference between working with Squire and Feldmann was night and day. He added that it was "such a learning process ... from a life perspective we developed and learned so much". In early January 2008, it was announced that the band had launched a new website. It featured photographs of the group working in the studio with Feldmann. The band said Feldmann "really set the bar high and inspired us to leap over it with no fear of clearance". He showed the group that they were able to "do whatever we want as long as we gave it our all every step of the way."

Recording took place at Feldmann's home studio in Los Angeles, California, dubbed Foxy Studios. Matt Appleton and Kyle Moorman engineered the sessions. On the recordings, Feldmann performed additional vocals, string arrangement, keyboards and percussion, while Appleton performed additional vocals, horns and keyboards. In addition, gang vocals were done by Hacikyan, Melillo, Czum, Feldmann, Kyle Moorman, Appleton, Chris Dauray, and Dave Taylor. Though Cimato left the group early in the recording process, his leave was not reported until mid-March. Melillo subsequently filled his position. Cimato initially tracked some parts, but were re-record for the most part. Hacikyan said Cimato was not "compatible. He wanted to do everything different for the band musically". The recording process was initially planned to last 30 days, however, it last three months and ended on March 21. Feldmann mixed the recordings while Joe Gastwirt mastered them.

== Composition ==
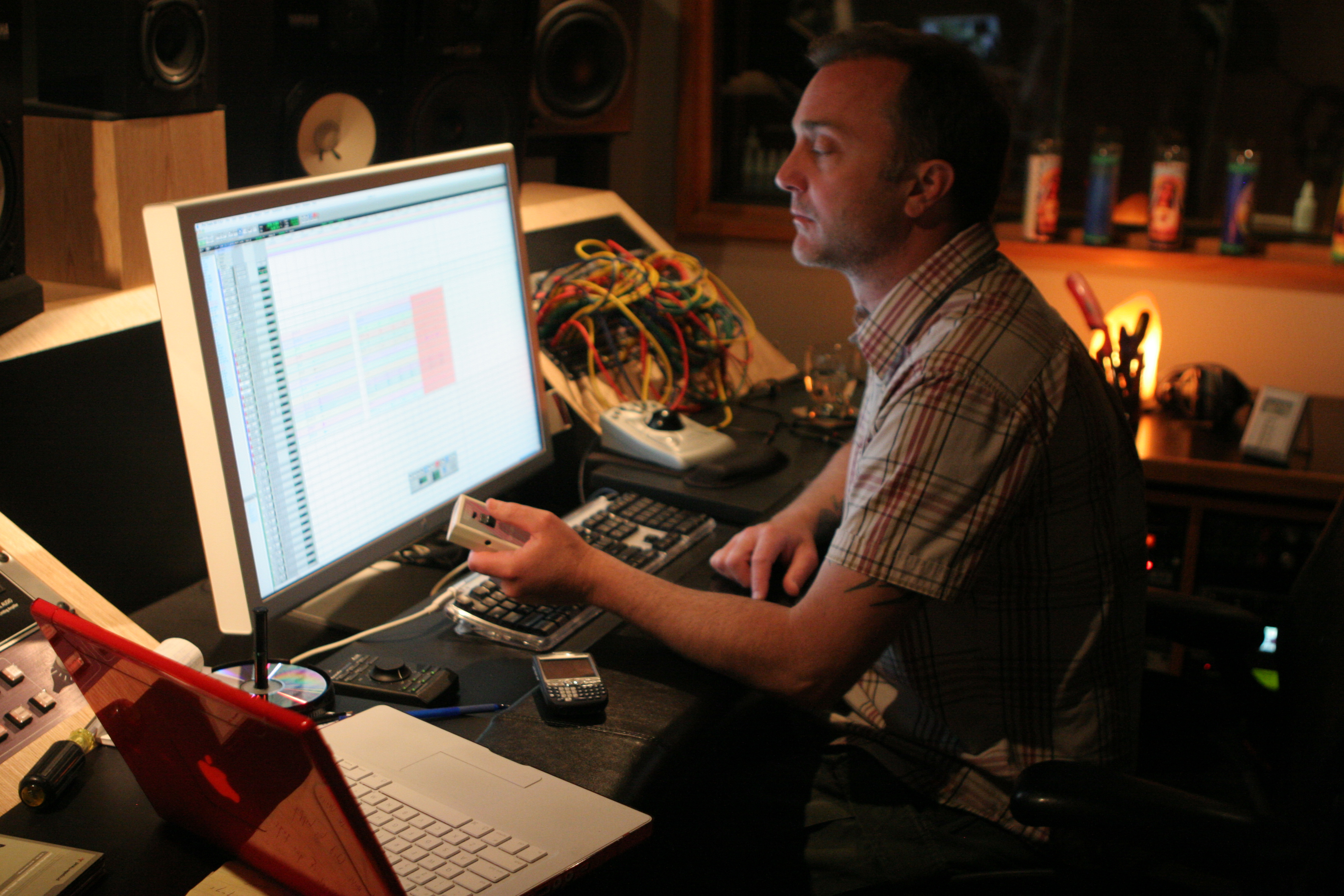
Most of the songs on the album were co-written with producer John Feldmann.

Discussing the album title, Hacikyan said "we all took 180s in our lives, as individuals, as a band. As everyone changes, as does life, as does the earth. It is all a rotation". The album was briefly given the album Change, however, it became constant theme throughout the album. Hacikyan explains "[The album is about] internal change, external change, global change, political change, any change, really. I tried to touch on a different variety of change on every single song". While working on the songs, the group was inspired by the Beach Boys, the Beatles, Tom Petty, Roy Orbison, and the Police. The band said Melillo "allowed us to feel comfortable and confident in making music. He was the missing piece to the puzzle that is CUTE, so to speak". Hacikyan said that it originally took him a while to write with Melillo as he was unsure what Melillo wished to do as a musician. The band said the album was written with the "full intention to assert ourselves as proper musicians in our minds and allow the public to then make their assessment". The album's sound has been described as pop punk and pop rock.

All of the music was credited to Cute Is What We Aim For and Feldmann, except "Practice Makes Perfect", "Loser", "Safe Ride", "Marriage to Millions" and "Miss Sobriety", which were written solely by the band. Hacikyan wrote all of the lyrics. Discussing writing Melillo said "[Czum was] really good at writing riffs .... [Hacikyan] totally has the lyrics and melody on lockdown, and I shine and polish [the material]". Hacikyan said "Practice Makes Perfect" was about a one-night stand which "lasted too many nights". According to Hacikyan, the ending of "Doctor" and "Miss Sobriety" was "us legitimately being aggressive". He explained that when writing the tracks "we were furious. ... [Those two songs are] what came out, and we accepted it". The group were initially hesitant with including the songs, "Then we decided, this is us ... We wanted it to be off the top of our heads and true". Julian Feldmann provides additional vocals on "Doctor". Referring to "Miss Sobriety", Hacikyan said he "personally wanted [it] to be as upfront as possible and address everything we could". Hacikyan said "Time" was "a personification of Mother Earth". The track features additional instrumentation from a few people: Appleton (oboe and flute), Dauray (alto sax) and Jess Neilson (clarinet and bass clarinet).

== Release ==
On April 22, 2008, Rotation was announced for release in two months' time; alongside this, "Doctor" was posted on the group's Myspace profile. "Practice Makes Perfect" was released as a single on May 5. The following day, Melillo was made an official member of the band. Later in the month, the band filmed a music video for "Practice Makes Perfect" in Los Angeles with director Walter Robot. In late May and early June, the band went on a tour of the UK. Hacikyan had missed the first show of the tour due to losing his passport, which resulted in Mellilo taking over vocals for the show. On June 5, the band posted "Safe Ride" on their PureVolume page. On June 16, the music video for "Practice Makes Perfect" was released through MTV's Overdrive video service. The video features all members of the band partaking in party behaviour they later regret. Between mid-June and mid-August, the band went on a headlining US tour with support from Ace Enders and A Million Different People, Danger Radio and Powerspace.

Rotation was made available for streaming on June 20 through their Myspace, before being released through Fueled by Ramen on June 24. Physical deluxe editions include "Through to You", a strings version of "Time", and live acoustic performances of "Moan" and "Teasing to Please (Left Side Strong Side)" as bonus tracks on the CD. In addition, it included a DVD which featured a making-of documentary, acoustic performances, karaoke videos and a photo gallery. An iTunes deluxe edition included the bonus tracks from deluxe CD version. Around its release, the band was accused of ripping off a Counting Crows design that was done by design studio Alphabet Arm. Cute Is What We Aim For's management contacted the company to create a design on an Counting Crows image that they had done. According to Alphabet Arm, "After some back and forth over pricing, we were informed they were going to concentrate on the merch design in-house and [would] contact us later. We never heard anything back." In August and September, the band supported Simple Plan on their tour of Canada. On August 31, it was reported that Falcone had left the band.

Two days later, Falcone's departure was announced. Falcone said he quit "because the personality conflicts and daily drama made it impossible for me to live a peaceful, happy life." Not by Choice drummer Liam Killeen temporarily filled in for Falcone. In an interview shortly after Falcone's departure, Hacikyan said "sometimes people don’t see eye to eye. [...] Whatever happened amongst us is something only we’ll know and we’re fine, we’re comfortable with it". With Michael Lasaponara drumming for the band, the group went on the Verizon College tour with Boys Like Girls and Lights in September and October. Between late October and mid-December, the band went on a tour of the US with Secondhand Serenade, A Rocket to the Moon, and Automatic Loveletter. Fueled by Ramen released Rotation, along with other albums in its catalogue, on vinyl in February 2009. Between early February and early April, the band headlined the Take Action Tour in the US. On April 21, the band premiered a music video for "Doctor" through Myspace. "Through to You" was posted on the group's Myspace on June 19. At the beginning of August, Melillo and Czum left the group. On August 20, it was announced that the band would be breaking-up.

== Reception ==
Professional ratings
Review scores
Source	Rating
AbsolutePunk	74%
AllMusic	2.5/5 stars
Alternative Addiction	3.5/5 stars
Chart Attack	Unfavorable
Contactmusic.com	Unfavorable
GameAxis Unwired	4/5 stars
Melodic	4/5 stars
The Skinny	1/5 stars
Ultimate Guitar	7/10

Rotation was projected to sell 20–25k copies, before eventually selling 23k copies in the first week and debuted at number 21 on the Billboard 200. The album also charted at number 9 on the Alternative Albums chart, number 10 on the Digital Albums chart and number 11 on the Top Rock Albums chart.

== Track listing ==
All music by Cute Is What We Aim For and John Feldmann, except "Practice Makes Perfect", "Loser", "Safe Ride", "Marriage to Millions" and "Miss Sobriety" by Cute Is What We Aim For. All lyrics by Hacikyan.

No.	Title	Length
1.	"Practice Makes Perfect"	3:44
2.	"Doctor"	3:09
3.	"Navigate Me"	3:21
4.	"Loser"	3:03
5.	"Do What You Do"	4:19
6.	"Hollywood"	3:36
7.	"Safe Ride"	3:52
8.	"The Lock Down Denial"	3:13
9.	"Marriage to Millions"	3:10
10.	"Miss Sobriety"	2:51
11.	"Time"	3:59
12.	Untitled (hidden track)	0:42
Total length:		39:06

iTunes deluxe version bonus tracks
No.	Title	Length
13.	"Through to You"	3:23
14.	"Time" (strings version)	3:57
15.	"Moan" (acoustic live from FBR Studios)	3:15
16.	"Teasing to Please (Left Side, Strong Side)" (acoustic live from FBR Studios)	3:52
Total length:		53:31

DVD

- 25-minute "In the Studio" documentary and interview
- 5 acoustic performances – live from FBR Studios
- Karaoke videos for all the songs from Rotation
- Exclusive photo gallery curated by Jeff Czum

== Personnel ==
Personnel per booklet, except where noted.

Cute Is What We Aim For

- Shaant Hacikyan – vocals
- Jeff Czum – guitar
- Dave Melillo – bass
- Fred Cimato – bass
- Tom Falcone – drums

Additional musicians

- John Feldmann – additional vocals, string arrangement, keyboards, percussion
- Matt Appleton – additional vocals, horns, keyboards; oboe and flute on "Time"
- Julian Feldmann – additional vocals on "Doctor"
- Chris Dauray – alto sax on "Time"
- Jess Neilson – clarinet and bass clarinet on "Time"
- Shaant Hacikyan, Dave Melillo, Jeff Czum, John Feldmann, Kyle Moorman, Matt Appleton, Chris Dauray, Dave Taylor – gang vocals

Production

- John Feldmann – producer, recording, mixing
- Matt Appleton – engineer
- Kyle Moorman – 2nd engineer
- Joe Gastwirt – mastering
- Chuck Anderson – cover, additional artwork
- Connie Makita – design, layout
- Alex Kirzhner – super secret art friend
- Andrew Zaeh – photography
- Barret Wertz – styling
- Tomiwa Aladekomo – art coordinator
- Michelle Piza – packaging manager

== Charts ==
Chart position for Rotation
Chart (2008)	Peak position
Canadian Alternative Albums (Nielsen)	45
US Billboard 200	21
US Top Alternative Albums (Billboard)	9
US Top Rock Albums (Billboard)	11
