= Building Homes from What We've Known =

Studio album by The Scene Aesthetic
- Released: April 7, 2006
- Genre: Indie folk
- Length: 45:44
- Label: Destiny Worldwide Records
- Producer: Brandon Metcalf

Building Homes from What We've Known is the debut full-length album by The Scene Aesthetic. It was released on April 7, 2006 and later re-released, with additional tracks, as a self-titled album.

== Track listing ==
All songs written by The Scene Aesthetic.

1. A Formal Introduction – 1:31
2. So Peter, You've Become a Pirate – 3:49
3. Alvin Maker's Greensong – 3:36
4. Call It a Lullaby – 3:51
5. Yes, Even Stars Break – 4:03
6. The Alamo Is No Place for Dancing – 4:03
7. Beauty in the Breakdown – 3:15
8. Yellow Birds & Coal Mines – 3:56
9. This Is a Suitable Valedictory – 4:35
10. Dear Time Traveler, – 4:36
11. We've Got the Rain on Our Side – 5:15
12. Beauty in the Breakdown (Acoustic) – 3:14

== Personnel ==
- Andrew de Torres – guitar, vocals
- Eric Bowley – vocals
- Brandon Metcalf – producer, engineer, mixer
