= Cute Is What We Aim For =

American rock band

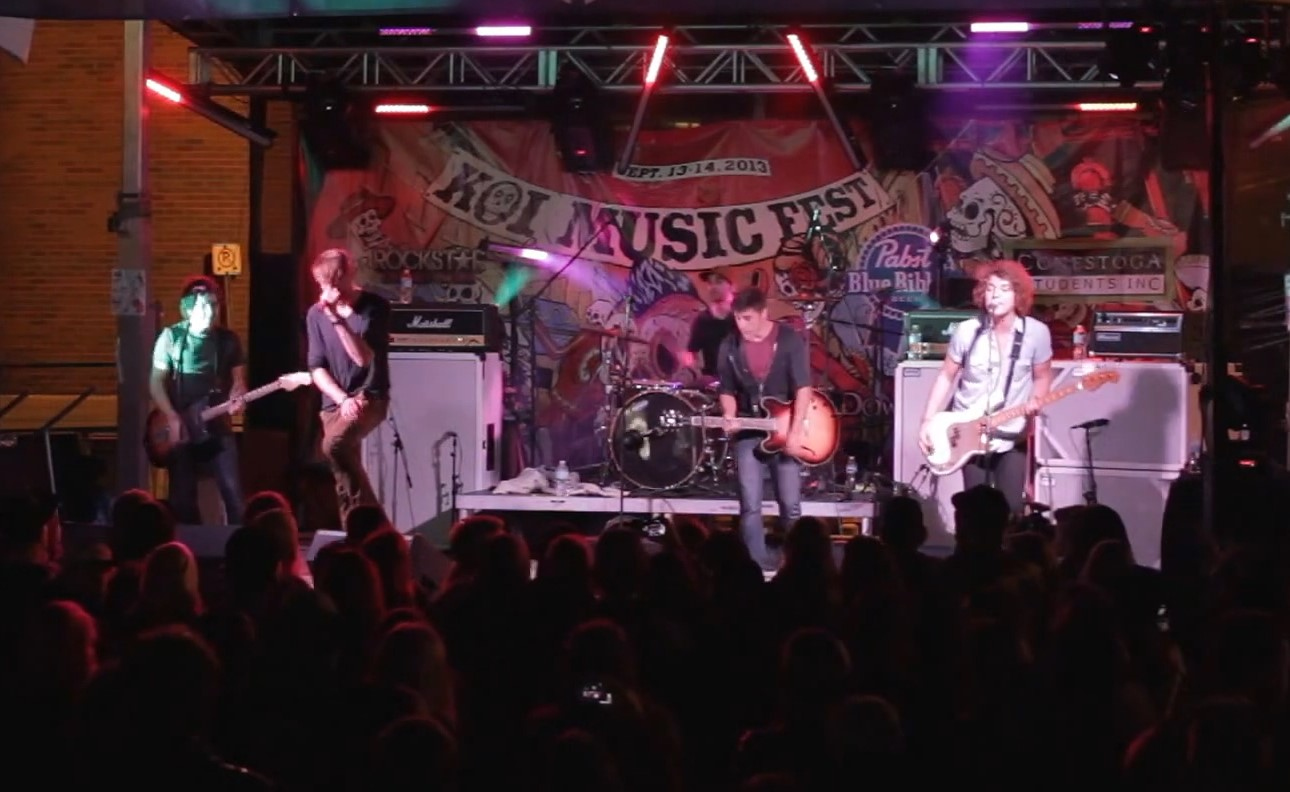
- Cute Is What We Aim For performing in 2013

Background information
- Origin: Buffalo, New York, U.S.
- Genres: Pop-punk; emo pop; power pop; alternative rock
- Years active: 2005–2009; 2010–2014; 2016–2019; 2026–present
- Label: Fueled by Ramen
- Members: Shaant Hacikyan; Tom Falcone
- Past members: Jeff Czum; Fred Cimato; Dave Melillo
- Website: cuteiswhatweaimfor.com

Cute Is What We Aim For is an American pop-punk band from Buffalo, New York. Formed in 2005, the group gained exposure through PureVolume and MySpace, before signing to record label Fueled by Ramen. Their debut studio album The Same Old Blood Rush with a New Touch was released on June 20, 2006, selling 14,000 copies in its first week, which became the fastest-selling debut in Fueled by Ramen's history at the time, a record previously held by Panic! at the Disco. The album features single, "The Curse of Curves", peaking at No. 191 on the UK Singles Chart. Their second studio album Rotation was released on June 24, 2008. Throughout the next few years, the band broke up and got back together, before splitting up again in 2014.

The band embarked on a ten-year anniversary tour for The Same Old Blood Rush with a New Touch in 2016, and doing the same for Rotation in 2018. After releasing a few B-sides and bonus tracks in 2019, the group broke up for a third time. In August 2026, the group joined Boys Like Girls for their Soundtrack of Your Summer Fest, their first public appearance in nearly ten years.

The band is associated with the scene subculture.

== History ==
=== Early years and signing with Fueled by Ramen (2001–2005) ===
The original members of Cute Is What We Aim For were childhood friends. When the band was formed in January 2005, the members were still in their teenage years. Since the band's inception, it has been subject to several line-up changes. The group initially started as a quintet, but soon cut down to four members: vocalist Shaant Hacikyan, guitarist/pianist Jeff Czum, drummer Tom Falcone and bassist/guitarist Fred Cimato. Hacikyan and Czum were playing in a different band called Cherry Bing and a New Hope, while Falcone and Cimato played in another, before coming together. The band's name came from Hacikyan who wanted something that's "gotta be Cute." It was also adopted as "an homage to a friend." Shortly after forming in January 2005, Cute Is What We Aim For began releasing demos through Myspace and PureVolume, which helped the band gain initial exposure. "Teasing To Please" was the first demo the band had ever recorded. Czum said their success was brought about by Hawthorne Heights' street team: "Literally overnight we got like 10,000 fans on Myspace and started to get attention from labels."

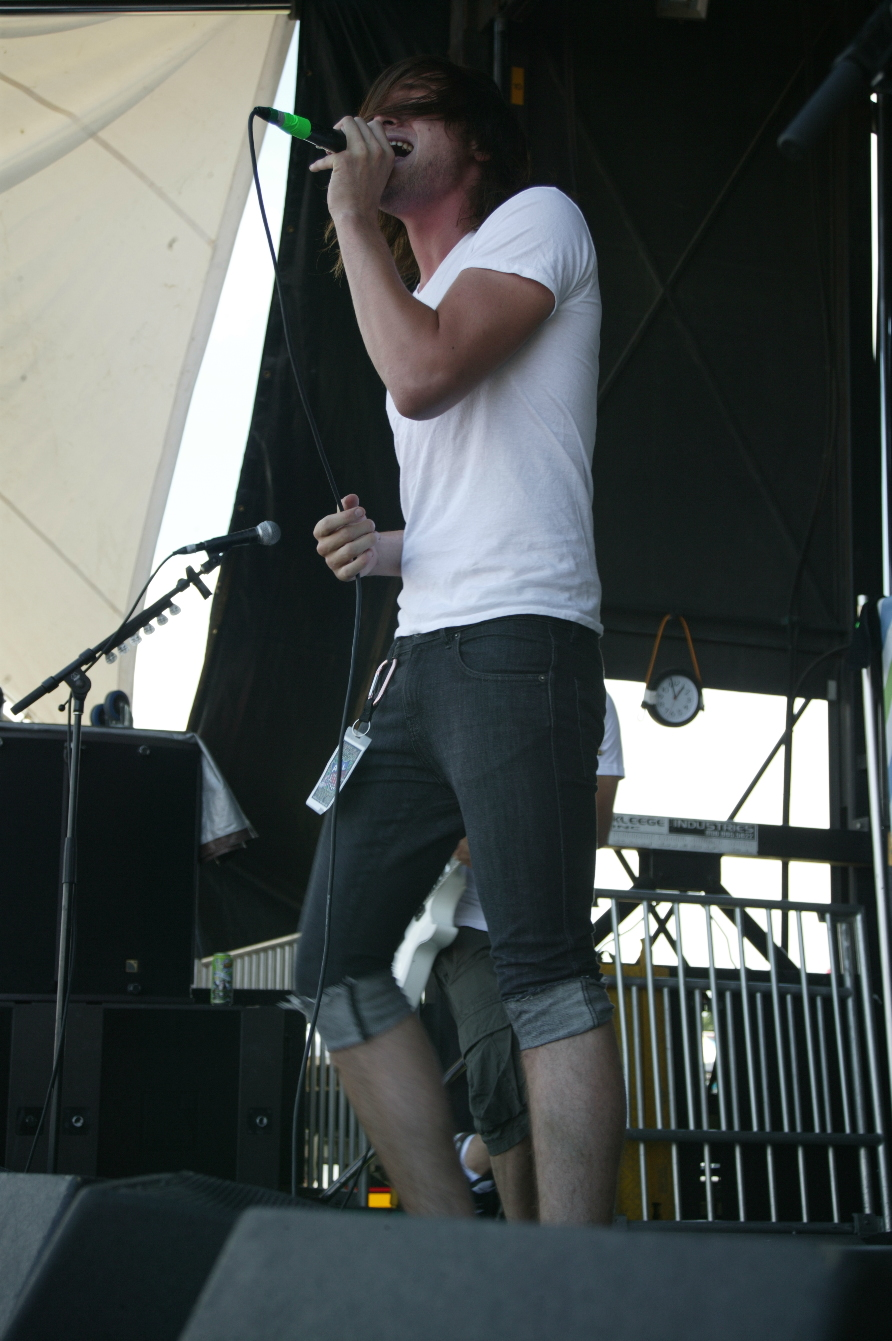
Cute Is What We Aim For during the 2007 Warped Tour

In the following months, the group continued to record and play shows, increasing their fan base and declining advances from record labels. In the spring of 2005, they won PureVolume's online Battle of the Bands competition, earning them a spot at that year's Bamboozle Festival. The group joined Rookie of the Year and Dave Melillo on tour in 2005. Following the tour, they headed to New York City to record some demos with Shep Goodman in July. During the recording session, they re-wrote a lot of the bass parts as their original bassist Donnie Arthur had left the band with Cimato taking over that position. Arthur went on to join the New Tragic, alongside members of From First to Last and Maylene and the Sons of Disaster in April 2006, before forming his own band Talking in My Sleep. On November 29, it was announced that the band had signed to Fueled by Ramen after their founder John Janick listened to their New York City recording sessions in July.

=== The Same Old Blood Rush with a New Touch (2006–2008) ===
In November 2005, it was announced that the band would be heading into the studio with producer Matt Squire in 2006 to record their debut studio album. In February 2006, they travelled to Beltsville, Maryland to record the album at Squire's studio, Salad Days Studios. On March 26, the song "The Curse of Curves" was made available for streaming via the group's PureVolume page. In April, the band joined Punchline, Valencia and New Atlantic on tour, alongside the Audition and appeared at the HFStival. In June, they embarked on a US tour with Anberlin, Jonezetta, and Blackpool Lights. On June 20, the group released their debut studio album, The Same Old Blood Rush with a New Touch, debuting at number 75 on the Billboard 200 selling nearly 14,000 copies in its first week. It became the fastest-selling debut in Fueled by Ramen's history, a record previously held by Panic! at the Disco. In August and September, the band supported Paramore on their tour of the US. On September 4, "There's a Class For This" was released onto iTunes as the lead single from the album. In October, the group performed a few headlining shows in the UK, before supporting Paramore on their UK tour. On October 18, it was announced that Cimato had left the band to return to school and was replaced by Jack Marin of October Fall. In October and November, the group supported Hellogoodbye on their tour of the US.

On February 5, 2007, "Newport Living" was released as the album's second single. From February to March, the band embarked on a headlining US tour with support from This Providence and All Time Low. They later co-headlined the Alternative Press tour with Circa Survive, with support from As Tall as Lions and Envy on the Coast from March to April. In April 2007, Marin announced he was departing the group due to "some personal issues with another member," leading to Cimato's return. On April 9, "The Curse of Curves" was released as the third and final single from the album. From June to August, they performed at the 2007 Vans Warped Tour. During this tour, Dave Melillo was added to the group as an additional guitarist. The band supported Fall Out Boy on their US tour from October to December. Around this time, Cimato had left the band again and Melillo would take over on bass. Cimato later formed a new band called Lovey in late 2015.

=== Rotation and breakup (2008–2009) ===
In 2008, Cute Is What We Aim For entered the studio to record with producer John Feldmann. It was recorded in Los Angeles at Feldmann's home and the group started writing during pre-production. They were supposed to record the album in 30 days however, following a few songwriting trips and some help from Feldmann, they took three months to record it. The group wanted the album to be different from their previous and took inspiration from Tom Petty, Weezer and Kanye West. Originally titled Change, the album's theme is about "a different variety of change." The title of the album was later changed to Rotation. On April 28, "Doctor" was made available for streaming via their MySpace page. On May 5, the band released the album's lead single, "Practice Makes Perfect". From May to June, the band went on a tour of the UK. Hacikyan had missed the first show of the tour due to losing his passport, which resulted in Mellilo taking over vocals for the show. On June 5, the band posted "Safe Ride" on their PureVolume page. Rotation was released on June 24, and debuted at number 21 on the Billboard 200 selling 23,000 copies in its first week.

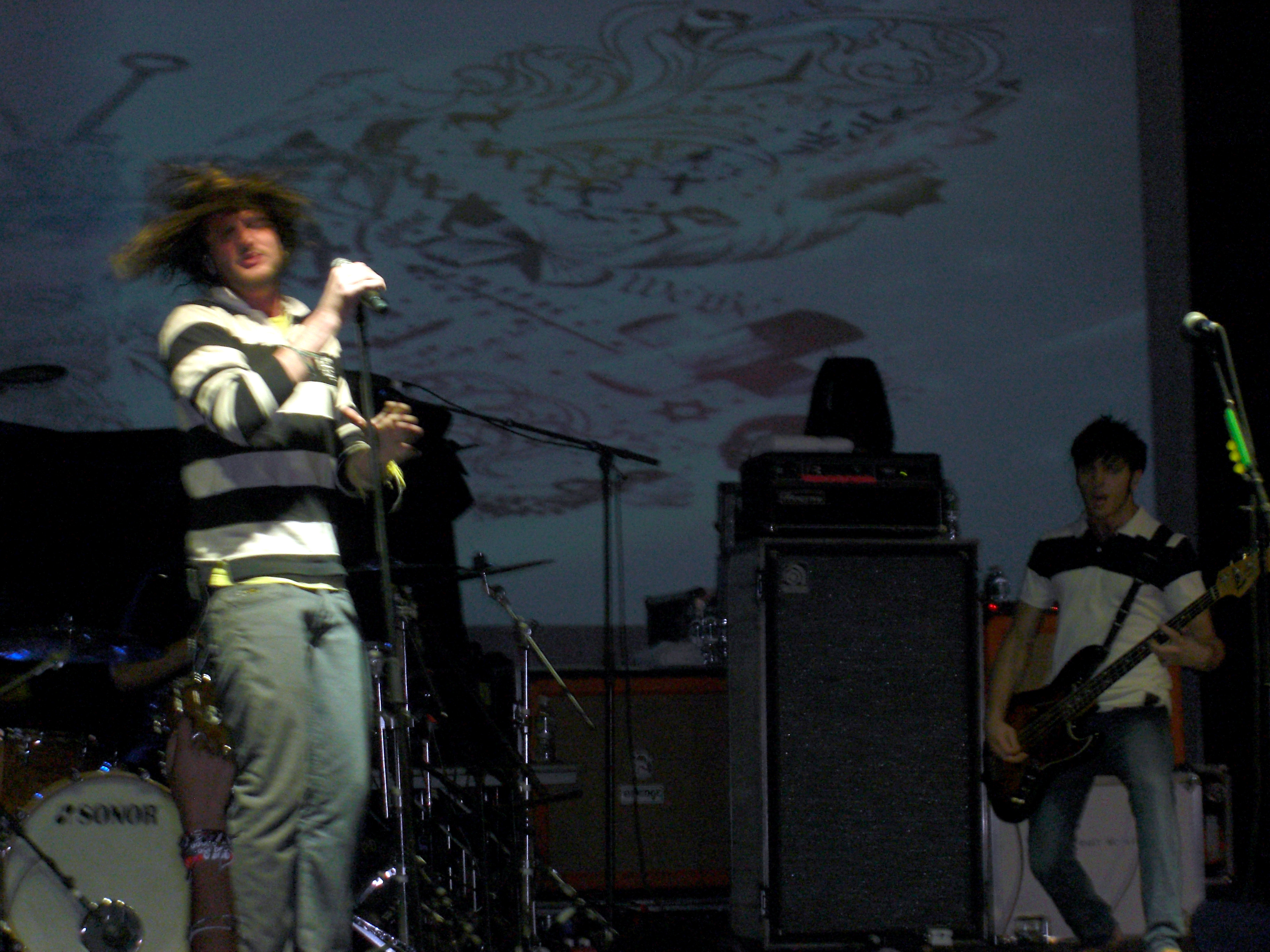
Cute Is What We Aim For performing in 2008

Between mid-June and mid-August, the band embarked on a headlining US tour with support from Ace Enders and A Million Different People, Danger Radio and Powerspace. They also supported Simple Plan on their Canadian tour alongside Metro Station and Faber Drive. On September 2, it was announced that Falcone had left the group during the tour following personal conflicts within the band. Not by Choice drummer Liam Killeen temporarily filled in for Falcone. The group joined Boys Like Girls and Lights on the Verizon College tour in September and October. During this tour, Michael Lasaponara joined the group as Falcone's replacement on drums. Between late October and mid-December, the band went on a tour of the US with Secondhand Serenade, A Rocket to the Moon, and Automatic Loveletter. In February and April 2009, the band headlined the Take Action Tour in the US. At the beginning of August, Melillo and Czum left the group. The two went on to form Nocturnal Me. On August 20, it was announced that the band would be breaking-up. Melillo spoke about what led up to the band's breakup stating, "the story pretty much is we got off Take Action!, and the idea was to write a record. We didn't have any type of management, we didn't have anyone that we were really working with, so we didn't have a direction, we didn't have any type of game plan. But we were really trying." In another interview in 2010, Hacikyan opened up about his struggles with alcohol abuse and why the group broke up stating, "My world was coming down on me from the depression and alcoholism, and then my baby–my dream—was falling away. I understood that it was all my doing through my abusive actions with substances. I went to rehab in October and joined some friends afterward to work on their project, but it kind of turned into something more."

=== Return and second breakup (2010–2014) ===
On January 3, 2010, Hackiyan decided to revive Cute Is What We Aim For as it was the five-year anniversary of the band. Hacikyan stated that he planned to continue releasing music under the band's name as a solo act. On April 29, Hacikyan released a new single called "Harbor" which was made available to download online. In May, Hacikyan revealed that he was halfway done recording a new album and recruited former Every Time I Die drummer Mike Novak for the recording process. In June, they joined Down with Webster on tour. In November, they embarked on an Australian tour where the band's line-up consisted of Hacikyan, Novak, Mike Brady and Kevin Scoma. Cute Is What We Aim For appeared on the Punk Goes Pop 3 compilation, released on November 2, 2010, covering the song "Dead and Gone" by T.I. and Justin Timberlake. On May 19, 2011, Hacikyan released the single, "He Went From A 'Fuck-Up' To 'Stand Up' Kid". On July 5, he released a demo track titled, "Next To Me". On February 28, 2012, Hacikyan released the single, "Titanic".

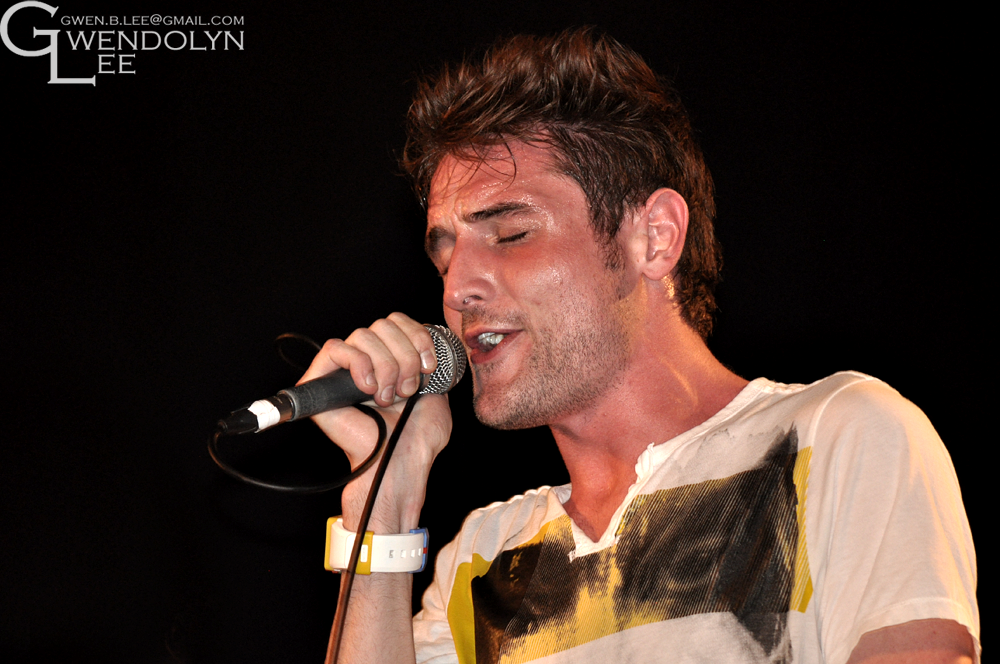
Hacikyan performing in 2010

On August 18, 2012, the band played an hour-long acoustic set with original members Shaant Hacikyan, Fred Cimato, and Jeff Czum. This was the first set the full band had performed in 6 years. During the set, the band announced that it was officially making a comeback. Cute Is What We Aim For played a comeback show with The Daydream Chronicles and Fictitious Ray on September 21, at Mohawk Place in Buffalo, New York. In December 2012, the group signed with Working Group Management and announced that they were working on a new album. In January 2013, the band supported Allstar Weekend on their headlining tour. In February 5, the group released a free EP for streaming and download. On September 2, the band released another new song titled "A Closed Mind With an Open Mouth" and announced a headlining tour for October. The band supported You Me at Six on their US tour in September and October.

On January 18, 2014, the band shared three songs for streaming on SoundCloud. These tracks were previously unreleased B-sides. The band performed on the Vans Warped Tour in 2014, after which they broke up for a second time.

=== Reunion (2016–2019, 2026) ===
In January 2016, Hacikyan reconnected with the rest of the band members. The group started discussing the possibility of a 10-year tour for The Same Old Blood Rush with a New Touch. In March, the band announced the anniversary tour, via their Instagram page. On November 23, the band was announced to perform at the Slam Dunk Festival in the UK for 2017, where they would continue their 10-year anniversary tour. In 2018, the group embarked on a ten-year anniversary for their second studio album, Rotation. In 2019, the group re-released three bonus tracks from their previous albums as singles via Warner Music Group, "Lyrical Lies (electric version)" and "Hipbones and Microphones" from The Same Old Blood Rush with a New Touch, and "Through to You" from Rotation.

In February 2026, former bassist Fred Cimato opened up about his time with the band on social media and revealed that the band had plans to perform at the When We Were Young Festival, however, the reunion never came to fruition. In May, it was announced that Cute Is What We Aim For would be reuniting to join Boys Like Girls on the Soundtrack of Your Summer Fest in Boston, on August 29, 2026. On August 27, the band played their first show in eight years, performing in Asbury Park, New Jersey. Along with Hacikyan, drummer Tom Falcone returned to the line-up. The band is scheduled to perform at the Sonic Temple Festival and Welcome to Rockville in May 2027.

== Musical styles ==
The band's music is described as pop punk, emo pop, power pop and alternative rock. Their debut album The Same Old Blood Rush with a New Touch is described as pop rock, pop punk and emo pop. Music critics compared the album to My Chemical Romance and Panic! at the Disco due to its lyrical content and sound. Alternative Press labelled it as one of "25 essential" albums released by Fueled By Ramen and described their single "The Curse of Curves" as an "essential tracks on emo throwback playlists and are enjoyed by elder emos everywhere."

According to Hacikyan, many of the songs written from the first album was inspired from the things he saw around him, "I feel like I was writing about, for lack of a better word, the winners, the cool guys, as someone looking from the sidelines. I never envisioned myself being that. I just wrote what I saw. I was trying to showcase a lot of what people were concealing.

== Band members ==
Current

- Shaant Hacikyan – lead vocals (2005–2019, 2026–present)
- Tom Falcone – drums (2005–08, 2012–2017, 2026–present)

Current touring

- Joe White – bass (2026–present)
- R.J. DeMarco – lead guitar (2026–present)
- Lance Claypool – rhythm guitar (2026–present)

Former

- Jeff Czum – guitar, backing vocals (2005–09, 2012–2017)
- Seth Van Dusen – bass (2014–2017)
- Donnie Arthur – bass (2005)
- Fred Cimato – bass (2005–06; 2007–08; 2012–13)
- Jack Marin – bass (2006–07)
- Dave Melillo – rhythm guitar (2007–08), bass (2008–09)
- Mike Lasaponara – drums (2008–09)

Former touring

- Liam Killeen – drums (2008)
- Michael Novak – drums (2010)
- Kevin Scoma – rhythm guitar (2010)
- Michael Brady – lead guitar, backing vocals (2010)
- Dylan Sellick – rhythm guitar (2009–10)
- Christopher Simmens – bass (2018)
- Aaron Miller – guitar (2018)
- Evan Kirkley – drums (2018)
- Liam Shatzer – guitar (2018)

Timeline

== Discography ==
=== Studio albums ===
List of studio albums, with selected chart positions and sales figures
| Title | Details | Peak chart positions | | | | | | Sales |
| Title | Details | US | US Alt | US Rock | CAN | CAN Alt | UK Rock | Sales |
|---|---|---|---|---|---|---|---|---|
| The Same Old Blood Rush with a New Touch | Released: June 20, 2006; Label: Fueled by Ramen (FBR087); Format: CD, DL, LP | 75 | — | — | 81 | 30 | 13 | US: 210,000 |
| Rotation | Released: June 24, 2008; Label: Fueled by Ramen (511251); Format: CD, DL, LP | 21 | 9 | 11 | — | 45 | — | US: 230,000 |
"—" denotes a recording that did not chart or was not released in that territory.

=== Singles ===
List of singles, with selected chart positions
| Title | Year | Peak chart positions | Album |
| Title | Year | UK | Album |
|---|---|---|---|
| "There's a Class for This" | 2006 | — | The Same Old Blood Rush with a New Touch |
| "Newport Living" | 2007 | — | The Same Old Blood Rush with a New Touch |
| "The Curse of Curves" | 2007 | 191 | The Same Old Blood Rush with a New Touch |
| "Practice Makes Perfect" | 2008 | — | Rotation |
| "Harbor" | 2010 | — | Non-album singles |
| "He Went from a 'Fuck Up' to a 'Stand Up' Kid" | 2011 | — | Non-album singles |
| "Titanic" | 2012 | — | Non-album singles |
| "A Closed Mind With an Open Mouth" | 2013 | — | Non-album singles |
| "Through to You" | 2019 | — | Rotation B-Side |
| "Lyrical Lies (electric version)" | 2019 | — | The Same Old Blood Rush with a New Touch B-Side |
| "Hipbones & Microphones" | 2019 | — | The Same Old Blood Rush with a New Touch B-Side |
"—" denotes a recording that did not chart or was not released in that territory.

=== Promotional singles ===
| Title | Year | Album |
|---|---|---|
| "Doctor" | 2008 | Rotation |
| "Safe Ride" | 2008 | Rotation |

=== Music videos ===
- "There's a Class for This" (2006, directed by Jay Martin)
- "The Curse of Curves" (2007, directed by Lex Halaby)
- "Newport Living" (2007, live version)
- "Practice Makes Perfect" (2008, directed by Walter Robot)
- "Doctor" (2009)
- "Next to Me" (2013, lyric video)
