= Good Night, Witness Light =

Studio album by Daphne Loves Derby
- Released: March 27, 2007
- Recorded: July/August 2006
- Genre: Indie rock
- Length: 39:34
- Label: Outlook Records
- Producer: Matt Squire

Daphne Loves Derby chronology
On the Strength of All Convinced (2005)	Good Night, Witness Light (2007)

Professional ratings
Review scores
Source	Rating
AbsolutePunk.net	72% link
Allmusic	3.5/5 stars

Good Night, Witness Light is Daphne Loves Derby's second full-length album and was released March 27, 2007. It is the last album the band has with Outlook Records for their two-album contract. Additionally, this was the last album for both Jason Call and Spencer Abbot with Daphne Loves Derby.

== Background ==
The "Witness Light" phrase which appears in the album title is taken from Robert Frost's poem "The Beech:"

Where my imaginary line
Bends square in woods an iron spine
And pile of real rocks have been founded.
And off this corner in the wild,
Where these are driven in and piled,
One tree, by being deeply wounded,
Has been impressed as Witness Tree
And made commit to memory
My proof of being not unbounded.
Thus truth's established and borne out,
Though circumstanced with dark and doubt
Though by a world of doubt surrounded.

The poem was also displayed on Daphne Loves Derby's website, with Frost being a favorite of Kenny Choi.

Several of the track titles on this album are taken directly from the 1998 film, The Truman Show. Kenny was quoted in an interview saying, "The message in that movie really stirred my soul. I actually saw it for the first time while in the studio; and connected with it so much. The movie was a visual manifestation of the emotions I was trying to capture in a lot of my lyrics."

When Truman makes his escape by boat and cannot be found, the director Christof dramatically commands, "Cue the Sun!"

A few minutes later, Truman is found and on screen once again. When the television crew switches to a camera on the boat which shows Truman courageously guiding the boat, Christof remarks, "That's Our Hero Shot."

Finally, when Truman meets his true love, Sylvia in the library, he notices a button that she is wearing. On the button, it is written, "How's it Going to End?"

== Track listing ==
No.	Title	Length
1.	"Are Two Chords Enough, Dear?"	1:35
2.	"Stranger, You and I"	3:12
3.	"Iron in the Backseat"	3:54
4.	"No One Is Convinced"	3:47
5.	"Marching Band Intro"	0:50
6.	"That's Our Hero Shot"	2:59
7.	"To Struggle With Light Colors"	3:36
8.	"Cue the Sun!"	3:34
9.	"Miniature Christmas Tree"	2:51
10.	"Love & Mercy"	2:56
11.	"Hello Color Red"	2:53
12.	"The Best Part About It Honey"	3:14
13.	"How's It Going to End?"	4:20
Total length:		39:34

== Band members ==
- Kenny Choi - Guitar/Keyboard/Percussion/Lead Vocals
- Jason Call - Bass/Keyboard/Percussion/Vocals
- Stu Clay - Drums/Percussion
- Spencer Abbott - Lead Guitar
