= Brother (The Scene Aesthetic album) =

Studio album by The Scene Aesthetic
- Recorded: 2009–2010
- Genre: Indie folk
- Length: 45:36
- Label: Independent
- Producer: Marshall Altman

Brother is the third studio album by The Scene Aesthetic. It was released on November 2, 2010.

== Track listing ==
No.	Title	Length
1.	"Why Don't We Try"	3:52
2.	"Beauty In The Breakdown (New Version)"	4:11
3.	"Never Gonna Let This Go"	4:09
4.	"Humans"	4:04
5.	"My Humility, You Are"	4:33
6.	"Talk About Love"	3:52
7.	"Lonely Girl (feat. Cary Brothers)"	3:43
8.	"8 Years of Silence"	4:35
9.	"Katy (Give Me A Shot)"	3:27
10.	"If You're A Bird"	3:50
11.	"Landon's Summer Diary"	4:16
12.	"Walk This Town"	3:33

== Personnel ==
- Andrew de Torres – guitar, vocals
- Eric Bowley – vocals
- Cary Brothers – additional vocals on the 7th track
