= A Type & a Shadow =

A Type & A Shadow

EP by The Scene Aesthetic
- Released: July 14, 2009
- Genre: Indie folk
- Length: 20:18
- Label: Destiny Worldwide Records

A Type & A Shadow is an EP by The Scene Aesthetic. It features six songs and was released on July 14, 2009.

== Track listing ==
1. "Grace Looks Back (Where You Need to Be)" – 2:59
2. "Humans" – 4:09
3. "Red Rover" – 3:16
4. "It's a Promise, Like a Song" – 3:26
5. "Come What May" – 3:54
6. "The Man I Am" – 3:54

== Personnel ==
- Eric Bowley – vocals
- Andrew de Torres – vocals, guitar
- Brandon Metcalf – producer, engineer, mixer
