= The Curse of Curves =

Single by Cute Is What We Aim For

from the album The Same Old Blood Rush with a New Touch
- Released: April 9, 2007
- Genre: Emo; pop-punk
- Length: 3:23
- Label: Fueled by Ramen
- Songwriter: Shaant Hacikyan
- Producer: Matt Squire

Cute Is What We Aim For singles chronology
"Newport Living" (2007)	"The Curse of Curves" (2007)	"Practice Makes Perfect" (2008)

Music video
- "The Curse Of Curves" on YouTube

"The Curse of Curves" is a song by American pop punk band Cute Is What We Aim For. It was released on April 9, 2007, as the third and final single from their debut studio album, The Same Old Blood Rush with a New Touch. The song peaked at number 191 on the UK Singles Chart.

== Background ==
"The Curse of Curves" was made available for streaming via the group's PureVolume page on March 22, 2006.

== Composition ==
"The Curse of Curves" was written by Shaant Hacikyan and was produced by Matt Squire. The song is described as an upbeat track, despite its notso "uplifting" lyrics. The lyrics speak about hookup culture without approving its lifestyle.

== Critical reception ==
"The Curse of Curves" was met with mixed reviews from music critics. Tom Woods of musicOMH described it as "a track to forget." He stated "The supreme arrogance of lines such as 'I'm too hip to keep tight lipped' are enough to turn attention away from the vocals, but the musicianship here is the kind of twinkling-yet-bruising pop-punk that can has been done to death." However, he praised the lyrics originality. Billy Hamilton of The Skinny remarked how the track "draws inspiration from that repulsive Hollywood blockbuster Jerry Maguire. Essentially, this is faux-guitar music for a generation yet to move on from the tweeny-rock of Busted. And much like the word cute, it's something you'll never want to be associated with." A positive review came from Alex Darus of Alternative Press who noted, "This Cute Is What We Aim For hit puts a mirror up to hookup culture without condemning it. And the vibe alone is enough to make you want to jump up and start dancing."

== Music video ==
The music video for "The Curse of Curves" premiered on February 26, 2007. It was filmed in January 2007 and directed by Lex Halab. The video begins with a group of people sitting at a large table in an empty mansion. The lead singer, Shaant Hacikyan is sat at the front as "the head of the table", proposing a toast throughout the entire video, joined by the rest of the band and their female partners. As the video continues, Hacikyan is seen eyeing all the women at the table for quite some time. At the end of the video, he is poisoned by presumably his significant other.

== Track listing ==
Digital download
No.	Title	Length
1.	"The Curse of Curves"	3:23

7" Vinyl
No.	Title	Length
1.	"The Curse of Curves"	3:23
2.	"Risqué" (AOL Sessions)	3:31

== Personnel ==
Credits for "The Curse of Curves" per The Same Old Blood Rush with a New Touch booklet.

Cute Is What We Aim For

- Shaant Hacikyan – vocals
- Jeff Czum – guitar, piano, MIDI
- Tom Falcone – drums
- Fred Cimato – bass, guitar

Production

- Matt Squire – producer, mixing, engineer
- Paul Leavitt – assistant engineer
- Ue Nastasi – mastering (Sterling Sound, Nashville, Tennessee)
- John Janick – A&R

== Charts ==
Chart performance for "The Curse of Curves"
Chart (2007)	Peak position
UK Singles (OCC)	191

== Release ==
Release dates and formats for "The Curse of Curves"
Region	Date	Format(s)	Label	Ref.
Various	April 9, 2007	Digital download	Fueled by Ramen	
United States	April 30, 2007	Contemporary hit radio	Fueled by Ramen	
