= On the Strength of All Convinced =

Studio album by Daphne Loves Derby
- Released: July 26, 2005
- Recorded: Johnny Cab Studios (Seattle, Washington)
- Genre: Indie rock
- Length: 44:20
- Label: Outlook Records
- Producer: Casey Bates

Daphne Loves Derby chronology
Closing Down the Pattern Department (2004)	On the Strength of All Convinced (2005)	Acoustic EP (2006)

Professional ratings
Review scores
Source	Rating
Allmusic	link
The Trades	92%/A- link

On the Strength of All Convinced is Daphne Loves Derby's first physically released studio album. The album, released on July 26, 2005, is almost entirely original material except for the song "Middle Middle", which was previously released on Purevolume.

Brian Shultz of Punknews.org rated it 2.5 out of 5 stars, describing it as "a pretty tolerable effort from the young trio (aged 18-20 a head)".

== Track listing ==
1. "Sundays" – 3:48
2. "Hammers and Hearts" – 2:55
3. "A Year on an Airplane" – 3:19
4. "Birthday Gallery" – 3:28
5. "You Versus the Sea" – 3:00
6. "Kirby" – 3:30
7. "Middle Middle" – 3:36
8. "Pollen and Salt" – 4:28
9. "If You're Lucky, No One Will Get Hurt" – 2:26
10. "Debussie" – 2:30
11. "What We Have Been Waiting For" – 8:15

Note: "What We Have Been Waiting For" contains a 3:15 hidden track, entitled "Dirt Doesn't Travel."

== Band members ==
- Kenny Choi - Guitar, keyboard, percussion, lead vocals
- Jason Call - Bass, keyboard, percussion, vocals
- Stu Clay - Drums, percussion
