= The Streets, the Sounds, and the Love =

Studio album by New Atlantic
- Released: April 10, 2007
- Recorded: Recording Studio, Seattle
- Genre: Rock
- Length: 36:56
- Label: Eyeball Records
- Producer: Casey Bates, Bobby Darling

The Streets, the Sounds, and the Love is the first full-length CD released by New Atlantic. It was produced by Casey Bates and Bobby Darling of Gatsby's American Dream. The CD also features a guest appearance from Will Pugh of Cartel.

== Track listing ==
All tracks written by New Atlantic.

1. "Cold- Hearted Town" (3:17)
2. "Wire and Stone" (2:41)
3. "Now That You're Gone" (3:07)
4. "You Get Me" (3:14)
5. "What It's Like to Feel Small" (3:14)
6. "I Won't Be Back" (3:21)
7. "So If You Try" (2:52)
8. "Safer Times" (3:36)
9. "Late Night Television" (3:14)
10. "The Ever After" (3:02)
11. "The Streets, the Sounds, and the Love" (5:18)

== Personnel ==
- Giovanni Gianni - vocals
- Christopher Hindley - guitar
- Dave Carlson - bass
- Jacob Kalb - drums
- Matthew Sztyk - guitar
- Casey Bates - production, engineering, mixing
- Bobby Darling - production, engineering, mixing
- Will Pugh - additional vocals (on "Wire and Stone")
