= Closing Down the Pattern Department =

EP by Daphne Loves Derby
- Released: October 13, 2004
- Genre: Indie rock
- Length: 22:46
- Label: Outlook Records
- Producer: Casey Bates

Daphne Loves Derby chronology
Daphne Loves Derby (2003)	Closing Down the Pattern Department (2004)	On the Strength of All Convinced (2005)

Professional ratings
Review scores
Source	Rating
AllMusic	2.5/5 stars

Closing Down the Pattern Department is Daphne Loves Derby's debut EP. It features "Come Winter", which was previously released on their internet-only debut Daphne Loves Derby. "We Bet the Willing" was originally recorded by Kenny Choi in his solo project, Desperado Revenge. The original release of Closing Down the Pattern Department did not feature "These Ghosts, My Hopes, the Sand, the Sea".

== Track listing ==
1. "We Bet the Willing" (Kenny Choi) – 1:02
2. "Closing Down The Pattern Department" (Daphne Loves Derby) – 4:03
3. "Come Winter" (Choi) – 3:45
4. "Deserts Eating Oceans" (Choi) – 4:56
5. "These Ghosts, My Hopes, the Sand, the Sea" (Choi) – 9:00
