= Used and Abused (album) =

Used & Abused

Studio album by Danger Radio
- Released: July 8, 2008
- Recorded: The Tree Fort (Los Angeles); Sound City (Los Angeles); The Matrix (Los Angeles); Phantom Studios (Westlake Village, CA)
- Genres: Neon pop punk; power pop
- Length: 46:05
- Label: Photo Finish
- Producers: Mike Green; Mike Elizondo; Martin Johnson

Danger Radio chronology
Punch Your Lights Out EP (2007)	Used & Abused (2008)	Nothing's Gonna Hold Us Down (2010)

Singles from Used and Abused
- 1. "Slow Dance with a Stranger" Released: July 2008

Used and Abused is a full-length album by the Seattle powerpop band Danger Radio. It was released on July 8, 2008, and spent one week on the Billboard 200, at number 198.

== Critical reception ==
The Daily Herald thought that "Danger Radio manipulates, squashes and expands synths to produce a high-energy beat fest with hooks that jump beyond catchy to addictive levels."

AllMusic wrote that "snappy guitar and synth hooks abound, resting atop percolating grooves that push even the poppiest, most melodic tunes into dance-floor territory."

== Track listing ==
No.	Title	Writer(s)	Length
1.	"So Far Gone"	Andrew de Torres, Nico Hartikainen, Mike Green	3:25
2.	"Things"	Andrew de Torres, Nico Hartikainen, Mike Elizondo	3:03
3.	"One More Chance"	Andrew de Torres, Nico Hartikainen, Mike Green	3:22
4.	"Kiss N' Tell"	Andrew de Torres, Nico Hartikainen	3:41
5.	"Your Kind (Speak to Me)"	Andrew de Torres, Nico Hartikainen, Mike Elizondo	3:24
6.	"Slow Dance with a Stranger"	Andrew de Torres, Nico Hartikainen, Tim James, Antonina Armato, Martin Johnson	3:28
7.	"Used and Abused"	Andrew de Torres, Nico Hartikainen, Mike Elizondo	4:22
8.	"Alive for the First Time"	Andrew de Torres, Nico Hartikainen, Mike Green, Martin Johnson	4:27
9.	"You All Believe"	Andrew de Torres, Nico Hartikainen	3:51
10.	"Broken Man"	Andrew de Torres, Nico Hartikainen, Lauren Christy, Scott Spock, Graham Edwards	3:41
11.	"Think About It"	Andrew de Torres, Nico Hartikainen	3:48
12.	"Another Lesson in Love"	Andrew de Torres, Nico Hartikainen, Mike Elizondo, Raine Maida	3:05
13.	"Where I Started"	Andrew de Torres, Nico Hartikainen, Mike Green	3:36

iTunes bonus tracks
No.	Title	Length
14.	"Heart You Stole"	3:39
15.	"Party Foul"	3:06

== Personnel ==
Danger Radio

- Andrew de Torres – vocals
- Andy Brookins – guitar
- Elan Wright – guitar
- Marvin Kunkel – bass guitar
- Nico Hartikainen – drums, programming, additional keyboards on tracks 1, 3, 4, 6, 8, 9, 10, 11 and 13, additional instrumentation on tracks 2, 5, 7 and 12
- Spencer Phillips – keyboards, piano, programming

Additional personnel

- Mike Green – production on tracks 1, 3, 4, 6, 8, 9, 10, 11 and 13, programming on tracks 1, 3, 4, 6, 8, 9, 10, 11 and 13, additional keyboards on tracks 1, 3, 4, 6, 8, 9, 10, 11 and 13, additional guitar on tracks 1, 3, 4, 6, 8, 9, 10, 11 and 13, mixing on track 13
- Larry Solak – trumpet on tracks 1 and 4
- Adam Hawkins – engineering
- Martin Johnson (of Boys Like Girls) – production on tracks 6 and 8
- Mike Elizondo – production on tracks 2, 5, 7 and 12, additional instrumentation on tracks 2, 5, 7 and 12
- Brent Arrowood – engineering
- Serban Ghenea – mixing on tracks 1, 2, 3, 4, 5, 6, 7, 8, 9, 10, 11 and 12
- Ted Jensen – mastering
