= Cady Groves =

American singer and songwriter (1989–2020)

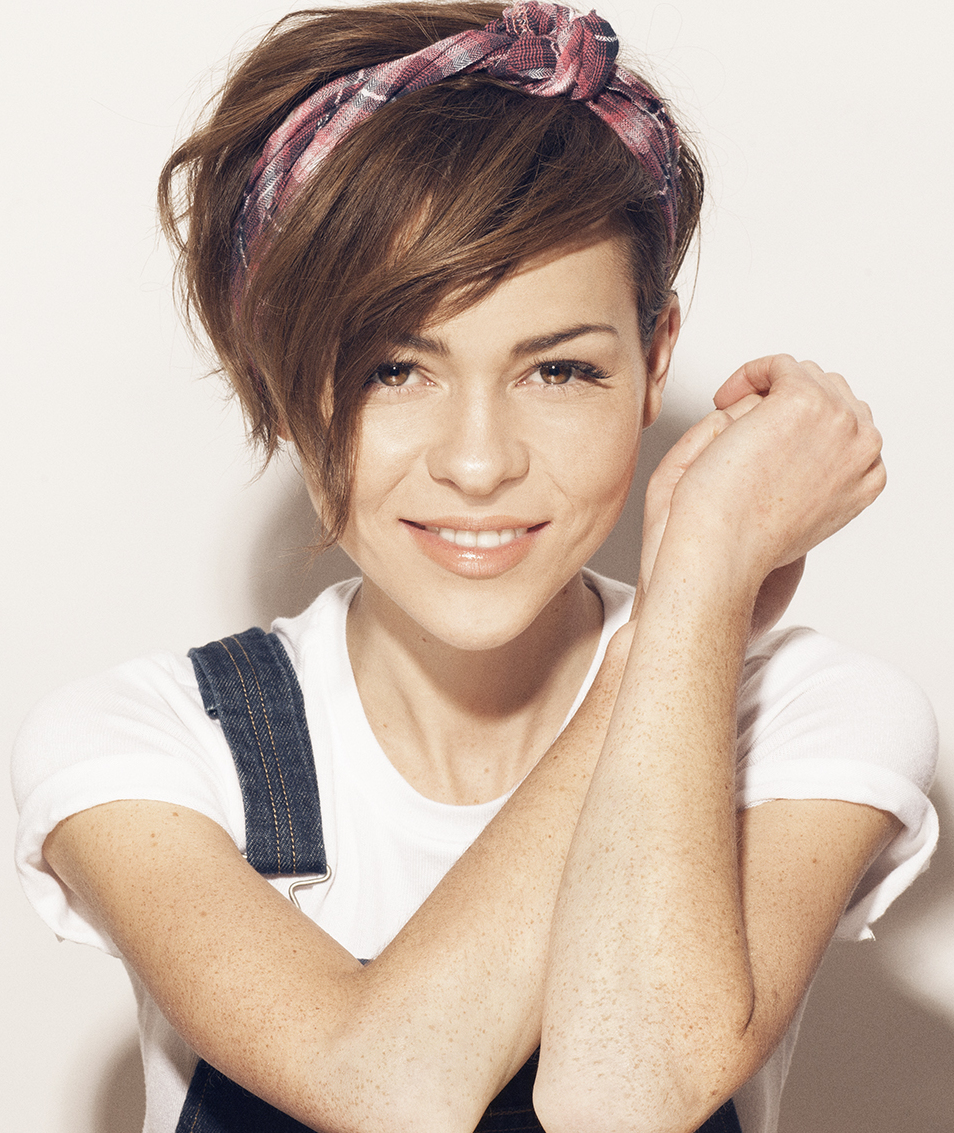
- Groves in 2016

Background information
- Born: July 30, 1989; Emporia, Kansas, U.S.
- Died: May 2, 2020 (aged 30) Brentwood, Tennessee, U.S.
- Genres: Country; pop; pop rock
- Occupations: Singer; songwriter
- Years active: 2009–2020
- Labels: Vel; RCA
- Website: cadygroves.com

Cady Danyl Groves (July 30, 1989 – May 2, 2020) was an American singer and songwriter. She began her career independently releasing music and signed with RCA Records in 2010. Her second EP, This Little Girl (2011), was positively received; its title track became her best known song. She went on to release another EP and six more singles before her death on May 2, 2020. Her fourth EP, Bless My Heart, was released posthumously that same year.

== Early life ==
Groves was born on July 30, 1989, to Carol Pettit and Larry Groves, and was the youngest of seven children. Her siblings were Kevan, Casey (died 2007), Cody, Kyle, Kelly (died 2014), and Kelsy, along with three half-siblings, Adam Groves, Courtney Farmwald and Carrie Groves. She lived in Emporia, Kansas until her parents divorced, and then the family moved to Marlow, Oklahoma. She later moved to Cache, Oklahoma, before relocating to Valley Center, Kansas.

She moved to Laughlin, Nevada, in 2005, where she graduated high school at sixteen. Cady wanted to pursue a career in songwriting, but her family encouraged her to obtain higher education, so she attended and graduated from the Culinary Arts program at Mohave Community College in Bullhead City, Arizona. In 2007, she left Nevada for Weatherford, Oklahoma, where she attended Southwestern Oklahoma State University.

== Career ==
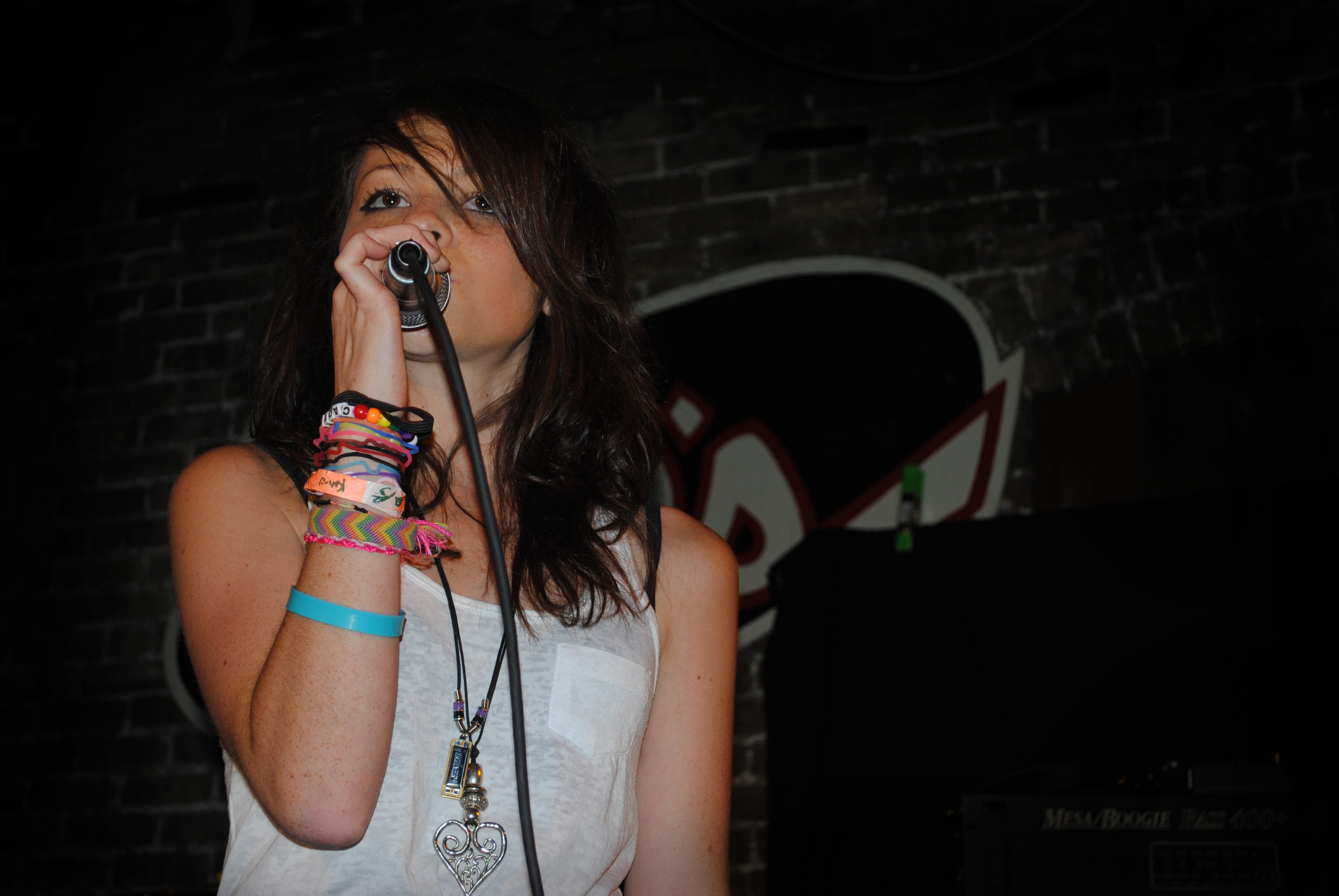
Groves performing in 2010

Groves released her first EP, A Month of Sundays, in 2009. Her debut studio album, The Life of a Pirate, followed in 2010. That year, Groves signed with RCA Records and toured with Third Eye Blind, Good Charlotte, and All Time Low. RCA paired Groves with several producers and songwriters (including Savan Kotecha, Carl Falk, and Kristian Lundin) as she began work on her first major-label album. She collaborated with Stephen Jerzak on "Better Than Better Could Ever Be" and collaborated with Plug in Stereo on "Oh Darling", which spent five weeks on the Billboard Rock Digital Songs Chart and peaked at #36. In 2011, Groves was featured on the single "You and I" by Secondhand Serenade and "All That I Need Is You" by Andrew de Torres.

Groves eventually left RCA and signed with New York–based independent label Vel Records. In February 2012, Groves uploaded a live cover of The Band Perry's "If I Die Young" to SoundCloud. The lyrics note that many writers and artists only become popular after death.

In 2015, Groves returned with a self-released single, "Crying Game", which was inspired by her tumultuous childhood and strained family relationships. She then embarked on her High School Nation Tour, where she performed for over 50,000 high school students. In 2015, a collaboration with Christian Burghardt took place, which led to the track "Whiskey and Wine."

Groves fourth and final EP, Bless My Heart, was released posthumously on May 29, 2020.

== Personal life and death ==
According to Ryan Williams, who was a friend of Groves, she was deeply affected by the premature deaths of her brothers Casey and Kelly due to addiction to prescription drugs, saying to Fox News: "Her dad wasn't really around anymore and music was really tough on her as well ... She had so many tragic things happen to her in her life. There was always someone's birthday that wasn't around anymore, like her brothers. There was always kind of like a dark shadow around her."

Groves died on May 2, 2020, at the age of 30. Her brother Cody stated that her death was due to unspecified natural causes and that self-harm and foul play were ruled out. On August 8, 2020, Fox News reported that an autopsy report stated that she died of complications from alcohol abuse.

== Discography ==
=== Studio albums ===
List of studio albums, with selected details and chart positions
Title	Album details	Peak chart positions
Title	Album details	US
The Life of a Pirate	Released: March 23, 2010; Label: Self-released; Formats: CD, digital download	—
"—" denotes a recording that did not chart or was not released in that territory.

=== Extended plays ===
List of extended plays, with selected details and chart positions
Title	Extended play details	Peak chart positions
Title	Extended play details	US
A Month of Sundays.	Released: October 1, 2009; Label: Self-released; Formats: Digital download	—
This Little Girl	Released: February 3, 2012; Label: RCA; Formats: CD, digital download	—
Dreams	Released: October 9, 2015; Label: Vel; Formats: Digital download	—
Bless My Heart	Released: May 29, 2020; Label: Self-released; Formats: Digital download	—
"—" denotes a recording that did not chart or was not released in that territory.

=== Singles ===
List of singles as lead artist, with year released, selected chart positions, and album name
Title	Year	Peak chart positions	Album
Title	Year	US	Album
"One In The Same"	2010	—	The Life of a Pirate
"This Little Girl"	2011	—	Non-album single
"Love Actually"	2012	—	Non-album single
"Forget You"	2013	—	The Smurfs 2: Music from and Inspired by
"Whiskey & Wine" (featuring Christian Burghardt)	2015	—	Non-album single
"Crying Game"	2015	—	Non-album single
"Dreams"	2015	—	Non-album single
"Oil And Water"	2015	—	Non-album single
"—" denotes a recording that did not chart or was not released in that territory.

=== As featured artist ===
List of singles as featured artist, with year released, selected chart positions, and album name
Title	Year	Peak chart positions	Album
Title	Year	US Alt	Album
"You And I" (Secondhand Serenade featuring Cady Groves)	2010	—	Hear Me Now
"Oh Darling" (Plug In Stereo featuring Cady Groves)	2011	21	Nothing To Something
"—" denotes a recording that did not chart or was not released in that territory.

=== Other songs ===
List of other songs with year released, selected chart positions, and album name
Title	Year	Peak chart positions	Album
Title	Year	US	Album
"(God Must Have Spent) A Little More Time on You"	2010	—	Rockin' Romance 2
"—" denotes a recording that did not chart or was not released in that territory.

=== Music videos ===
List of music videos, with year released
Title	Year	Ref.
"Real With Me"	2010	
"This Little Girl"	2011	
"Oil and Water"	2017	

== Tours ==
- Bamboozle Road Show 2010 (2010)
- Let's Be Animals Tour 2011 (2011)
- Beautiful Freaks Tour (2012)
- High School Nation Tour (2015)
