= New Atlantic (American band) =

American alternative rock band

- Origin: New Jersey, U.S.
- Genres: Alternative rock
- Years active: 2004–2010
- Labels: Eyeball, Warner Bros.
- Members: Giovanni Gianni; Chris Hindley; Matthew Sztyk; Dave Carlson; Jake Kalb
- Website: http://www.myspace.com/newatlantic

New Atlantic was an alternative rock band from New Jersey signed to Eyeball / Warner Bros. Records.

== History ==
New Atlantic started in 2004, they released many EPs independently before signing with Eyeball / Warner Bros. Records. They released the "Wire and Stone" single (featuring backup vocals by Will Pugh of Cartel) online in 2006 and their debut album The Streets, the Sounds, and the Love was released on April 10, 2007. The group's video has been in rotation on mtvU, and the band was named a "featured artist" by the television station. The group has toured with Cartel, Cobra Starship, Boys Like Girls, Waking Ashland, An Angle, the Starting Line, Daphne Loves Derby, Liam and Me, Cute Is What We Aim For, the Spill Canvas and Copeland. They were managed by the Starting Line's guitarist, Matthew Watts.

On April 29, 2010, lead singer Giovanni Gianni announced the breakup of New Atlantic.
