= Brandon Metcalf =

- Also known as: Tiny Lil Fade
- Born: July 3, 1986 (age 40)
- Origin: Nashville, Tennessee and Seattle, Washington, United States
- Genres: Rock, acoustic, pop punk, power pop, country, LDS, singer-songwriter
- Occupations: Record producer, engineer, mix engineer
- Years active: 2005–present
- Website: www.brandonmetcalf.com

Brandon Metcalf (born July 3, 1986) is an American record producer and entrepreneur. In 2005, he founded Destiny Collective, a network of businesses in the music and merchandising industries. He was originally a Seattle-based record producer but as of August 2012 is now based primarily out of Nashville.

== History: Teenage years ==
Starting in the 6th grade, Metcalf was a paperboy. At age 13, he took savings from the paper route job and purchased a set of turntables after deciding he wanted to be a DJ. Adopting the nickname FADE, he spent his teenage years DJing at competitions, school dances, clubs, and weddings. He started his first official business at age 15 which was a wedding DJ business. At age 13 he wrote and recorded his own hip hop album, using beats he made on the computer and sampled from vinyl records. At age 16, he upgraded to Pro Tools software and recorded local acoustic projects out of his parents home.

== Destiny Collective ==
At age 19, Brandon sold the DJ company, dropped out of Brigham Young University, and purchased a home to build a studio in. He started a new company called Destiny Collective to focus on artist development, record production, and merchandising. The parent corporation includes successful ventures shirtsforgreeks.com, specializing in collegiate and Greek apparel, and the newly launched Destiny Nashville, a recording studio and production company on music row.

== Studio work ==
Brandon has worked in the studio as a producer, engineer, and/or mixer with bands and artists such as:

- Jewel
- Blues Traveler
- Secondhand Serenade
- Due West
- The Classic Crime
- Julia Sheer
- Elenowen
- Trent Dabbs
- Brooke Waggoner
- Veronica Ballestrini
- Brooke Hogan
- Stephen Jerzak
- Daphne Loves Derby
- The Real You
- The Scene Aesthetic
- He Is We
- Danger Radio
- A Change of Pace
- Common Market
- Anarbor
- Artist vs Poet

Aside from his personal studio, he has worked on projects in studios throughout Seattle, Los Angeles, and Nashville. His production work has received positive reviews from music publications and websites such as absolutepunk.net.

== Recognition ==
Brandon and his work has been featured on:

- MTV
- VH1
- e!
- USA
- ABC
- NBC
- Rolling Stone

In addition, he has been featured in interviews in The Wall Street Journal, The New York Times, The Seattle Times, FOX, and ABC News.
