= The Scene Aesthetic =

American alternative rock band

- Origin: Everett, Washington, U.S.
- Genres: Alternative rock, indie folk, emo pop
- Years active: 2005–Present
- Label: Unsigned
- Members: Andrew de Torres; Eric Kimberlin
- Website: thesceneaesthetic.com

The Scene Aesthetic is an American alternative rock band based in Seattle, Washington. The duo consists of Andrew de Torres (also a member of Danger Radio) and Eric Kimberlin.

== History ==
Originally from Everett, Washington, the band gained recognition through online outlets MySpace, YouTube, and PureVolume after publishing their first song "Beauty in the Breakdown" in 2006. By 2007 on MySpace, "Beauty in the Breakdown" had nearly nine million plays, and the band had over 140,000 followers. The song also had half a million views by August 2006. Their debut album Building Homes from What We've Known had around 1.3 million downloads on PureVolume. However, as The Wall Street Journal reported in 2006 and Andrew Keen wrote in his 2007 book The Cult of the Amateur, the band made no revenue from any of these online streams.

The Scene Aesthetic's first tour in the summer of 2006 included mostly small, obscure venues such as a high school and pizza restaurant, with tickets averaging from $5 to $10. Keen commented: "...their struggle to translate their massive virtual following into either significant record sales or a major label contract is an ominous augury for the other three million bands on MySpace trying to make a living selling their music." Eventually, the band would tour with acts signed to major labels, for instance Owl City and Brooke Waggoner in 2009.

== Band members ==
- Eric Kimberlin – lead vocals (2005–2012; 2013 to present as Prince of Spain)
- Andrew de Torres – lead vocals, guitar, harmonica, ukulele (2005–2012; 2013 to present as Prince of Spain)

== Discography ==
=== Albums ===
- Building Homes from What We've Known (April 7, 2006)
- The Scene Aesthetic (July 10, 2007)
- Brother (November 2, 2010)

=== EPs ===
- A Type & A Shadow EP (July 14, 2009)
- Sister EP (May 23, 2011)
- The Days Ahead (December 6, 2011)

=== Singles ===
- Season (October 28, 2018)
- Otherside (June 21, 2019)
- Enough (June 12, 2020)

=== DVDs ===
Year	Title
2007	On the Road with The Scene Aesthetic

=== Cover songs ===
Year	Album	Song (Original artist)
2009	Rockin' Romance	"Love Story" (Taylor Swift)
2010	Rockin' Romance II	"Such Great Heights" (The Postal Service)
2011	Purevolume download	"Happily Ever After" (He Is We)

== See also ==
- Danger Radio
