= Daphne Loves Derby =

American indie rock band

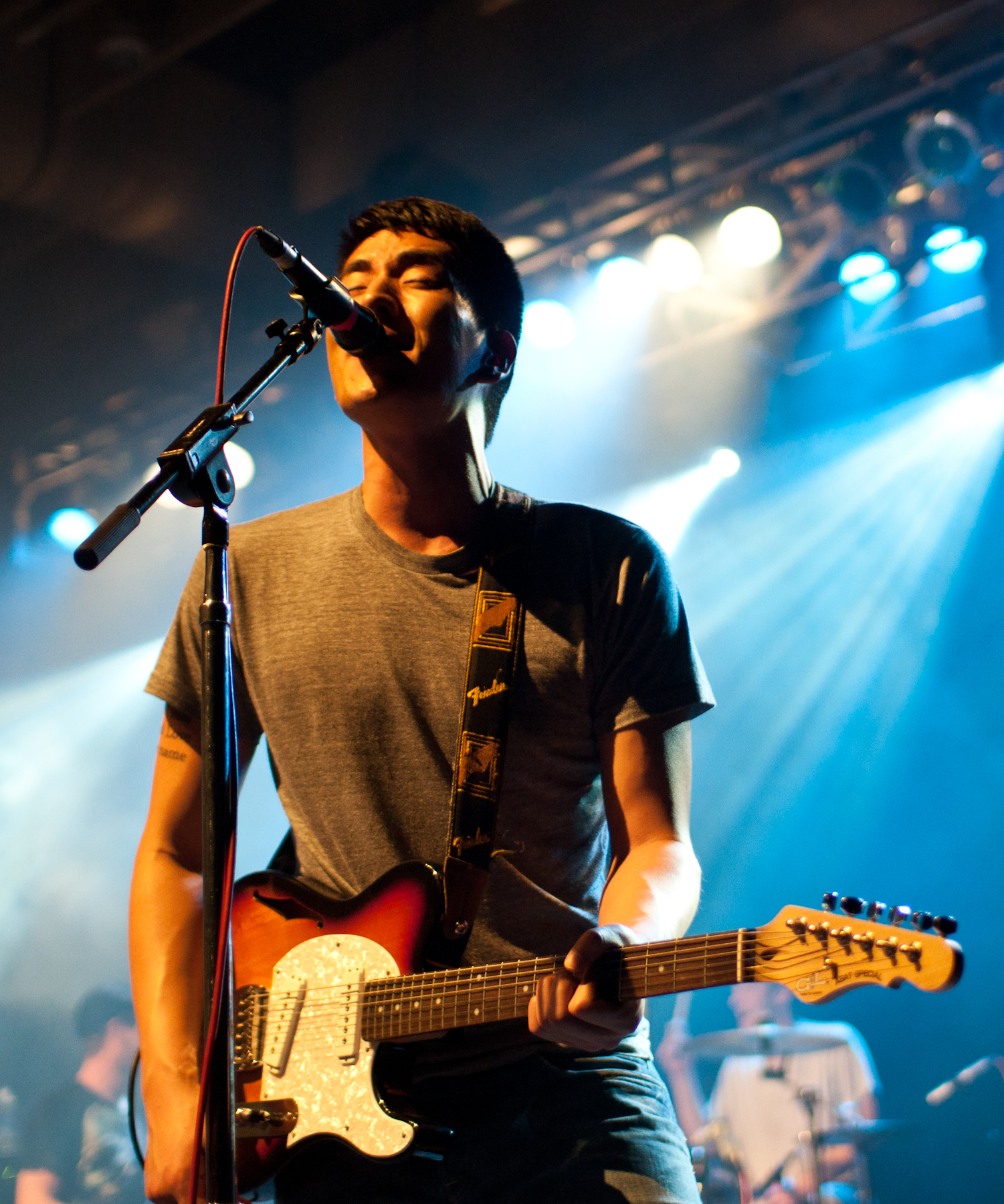
- Kenny Choi at Rock 'n Roosevelt at UC San Diego

Background information
- Origin: Kent, Washington
- Genres: Indie rock, Alternative rock
- Years active: 2001–2011, 2022, 2026
- Label: Outlook Records (former)
- Members: Kenny Choi; Stu Clay; Jason Call; Spencer Abbott; David Sparks
- Past members: Nik Kosty; Joe Kosty

Daphne Loves Derby is an inactive American Indie rock band that formed in Kent, Washington, in 2001. They have released four studio albums; their third full-length record, 2007's Good Night, Witness Light, peaked at number 30 on the Billboard Top Heatseekers chart. The band was featured on Billboard's official website following the release of the album.

== Background ==
Much of their popularity comes from the website PureVolume, where they were the first band to a million plays. For a time, they held the number one spot on PureVolume's Unsigned Artists page, but in 2005 they signed onto Outlook Music/Universal Records. The band has been featured in the Bamboozle Left tours numerous times, as well as playing the Ernie Ball "local heroes" stage at Warped Tour. They have had several releases, including their self-titled debut album, On the Strength of All Convinced, which was released on July 26, 2005. Their latest album, Good Night, Witness Light, was released on March 27, 2007. On March 3, 2011, The California Aggie online edition posted an interview with the band where Sparks said "We actually just recorded an album and we're working with a label to hopefully release it this summer. It was a good process and we recorded the whole thing in two weeks. So right now we're still kind of stewing on the extra thing to do with it."

On December 29, 2015, Kenny Choi and Jason Call appeared on The Casey Bates Podcast. On the program, they discussed their early history, their decision to stop touring, and streamed three previously unreleased songs.

On June 24, 2016 Jason Call posted a new Daphne Loves Derby track titled "Horrible Sound" online.

On December 10, 2021 Jason Call released a new Daphne Loves Derby song titled “Waking Up”. The track was an unreleased demo of Kenny Choi’s that Jason re-produced and re-recorded.

On June 8th, 2026, Daphne Loves Derby announced a one night only reunion show on October 2nd in support of This Providence in Seattle, WA at The Showbox. The group later announced that all original members would be playing including Choi, Clay, Call, Abbott, and Sparks.

== Members ==
=== Current members ===
- Kenny Choi - Vocals/Lyrics/Rhythm Guitar
- Jason Call - Bass/Vocals/Guitar/Piano
- Stu Clay - Drums
- Spencer Abbott - Lead Guitar
- David Sparks - Guitar/Bass/Vocals

=== Past members ===
- Nik Kosty - Lead Guitar
- Joe Kosty - Bass

=== Touring members ===
- Jude Zadaski - Keyboard (2008)
- Andrew Alojipan - Guitar / Vocals (2022)
- aReJay Ella - Guitar / Vocals (2022)

== Discography ==
=== Albums ===
- Daphne Loves Derby (2003)
- On the Strength of All Convinced (2005)
- Good Night, Witness Light (2007)
- Flesh & Fears (2008) (Re-released 2021)

=== EPs ===
- A Sudden Change EP (2001)
- The Wonder Years EP (2003)
- Post Post EP (2004)
- Closing Down the Pattern Department (2004)
- Calm the Jock Down (2006)
- Acoustic EP (2006)
- Changing Fashion (2007)
- Changing Hairstyle (2007)
- Merry Christmas, Frank (2010)
- Horrible Sound EP (2017)
- Odds & End (2021)

Demos + Compilations

- Exit (2021)
- On the Strength of All B-Sides (2022)

=== Videography ===
- Hammers and Hearts (2005)
- Sundays (2006)
- That's Our Hero Shot (2007)
- Stranger, You and I (2007)
