= Dave Melillo =

American guitarist and bassist

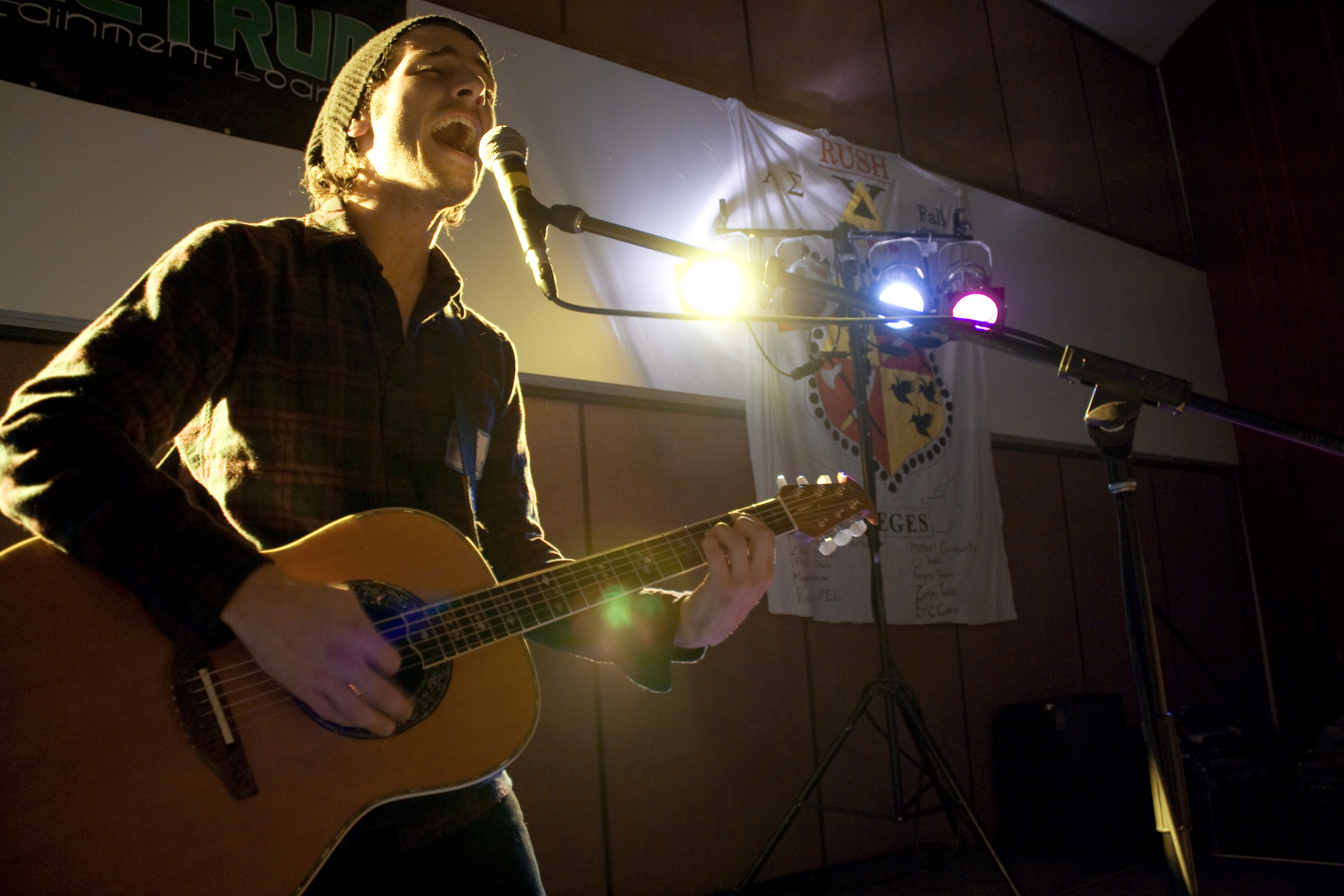
- Melillo in a jam session located in Berwinsdale PA performing

Background information
- Born: David A. Melillo Jr. June 12, 1988 (age 38); New Jersey, U.S.
- Genres: Rock, acoustic rock, pop-rock, alternative
- Instruments: Vocals, guitar, piano, bass
- Years active: 2004–present
- Label: Drive-Thru Records

David Andrew Melillo (born June 12, 1988) is the former lead guitarist for Anarbor, and the former bassist for pop rock band Cute Is What We Aim For. His earlier material as a solo artist consisted of acoustic guitar-driven acoustic rock and piano-accented power pop, somewhat in the vein of early Dashboard Confessional and The Rocket Summer.

== Biography ==
David Melillo was born on June 12, 1988, in Glen Ridge, New Jersey to David A. Melillo Sr. and Gina A. Melillo. After moving to Celebration, Florida, in December 2000, he learned how to play the guitar, the bass guitar and the piano and eventually began writing songs. While attending Celebration High School, he played in several ensembles, including the short-lived garage band Trexx.

In mid-2004, Melillo formed the Taking Back Sunday-inspired indie rock band Arcana. While their submitted two-song demo fell on deaf ears with Drive-Thru Records, Melillo's solo material did not. Drive-Thru Records invited Melillo to play a showcase for the label and signed him immediately in December 2004, at the age of sixteen. Melillo made his debut on the Drive-Thru Records and PureVolume compilation album Bands You Love, Have Heard of, and Should Know (2005) with his song "Wait for It". Melillo spent the following summer recording with producer James Wisner in St. Cloud, FL. Melillo's debut EP, titled Talk Is Cheap, was first released on April 17, 2006, as a free digital download from mtvU. The physical CD release was issued on June 13 through Drive-Thru Records, containing one extra track.

After a falling out with Drive Thru Records, Melillo joined Cute Is What We Aim For playing rhythm guitar on the 2007 Warped Tour. He toured with the band for the following 2 years on bass guitar and helped write/record the band's sophomore album "Rotation" alongside John Feldmann. In 2009, Melillo left the band for personal reasons, and formed a new band, Nocturnal Me, with former members of Cute Is What We Aim For. Nocturnal Me released three EPs: "Self Titled" in 2009, "Too" in 2010 and "Two Faced" in 2011.

In 2010 Melillo shared production credits on several independent releases, most notably Leslie Mosier's debut EP/album and Set It Off's EP which preluded the band's signing with Equal Vision Records. Melillo also began working as a pop/r&b songwriter in 2010 for several major labels and artists, with a focus on melody/lyrics.

2011 began with Melillo refocusing his efforts on his own music. He released a 4-song EP "Future Focused" in October to be followed by a 13-track mix-tape titled "Thinking Of You" in November.

== Discography ==
=== EPs ===
- Talk Is Cheap (2006)
- Future Focused (2011)

=== Albums ===
- You've Got Potential (2022)

=== Non-album tracks ===
- "Wait for It" – released on Bands You Love, Have Heard of, and Should Know (2005)
- "It Ain't Me Babe" – released on Listen to Bob Dylan: A Tribute (2005)
- "All I Want for Christmas" – released on A Santa Cause 2: It's a Punk Rock Christmas (2006)
- "The Ties that Bind" released on Demo (2008)
- "Read Between The lines" released on Demo (2008)

== Dave Melillo's touring band ==
- Dave Melillo – vocals, acoustic guitar
- Clark Spurlock – lead guitar
- Matt Mendes - bass
- Nate Mullins - drums
- Trex Alvarez - Triangle
