= Andrew de Torres =

- Origin: Puerto Rico
- Genres: Indie folk; indie rock
- Instrument(s): Vocals guitar ukulele
- Years active: 2003–present
- Labels: Photo Finish Records; Destiny Worldwide Records

Andrew de Torres is the lead vocalist of Danger Radio and former lead vocalist and guitarist of The Scene Aesthetic. Along with Eric Kimberlin, who was also in The Scene Aesthetic, he also released music as Prince of Spain. Andrew continued to write and record music as a solo artist under the name Kaptan.

== Biography ==
=== Danger Radio ===
De Torres met his future Danger Radio band-mate Nico Hartikainen during their time at middle school in Edmonds in 1999. The pair involved bassist Marvin Kunkel to form what would morph into Danger Radio after several line-up changes. Danger Radio have released three EPs and one full-length album, Used and Abused.

=== The Scene Aesthetic ===
Andrew got together with Eric Kimberlin in January 2005 to write a song, which became their successful single "Beauty in the Breakdown". The two continued to write together throughout 2005 and 2006 as The Scene Aesthetic until they had enough material for their debut full-length, Building Homes from What We've Known. The Scene Aesthetic have released three full-length albums, a DVD and an EP. They have also covered Taylor Swift's "Love Story" for a compilation disc.

=== Solo work ===
De Torres started his solo work under the moniker Man with Robot Hands in 2007 with several tracks being available for streaming on MySpace.

On March 9, 2010, de Torres stated that he has plans to release a solo album in early 2010. It seems unlikely that his solo release will be under the name Man with Robot Hands as all of the demos are available for streaming on MySpace under his own name.

Andrew de Torres released his first single "All That I Need Is You" featuring Cady Groves. (January 18, 2011)

=== Other projects ===
Andrew de Torres is featured in Jeffree Star's single titled "Starstruck", from his Cupcakes Taste Like Violence EP. Andrew is also featured in AJ Rafael's single, "When We Say" off his 2011 album, Red Roses. Together with Eric Kimberlin of The Scene Aesthetic, they released a single album called, "His Majesty" under the name Prince of Spain. It was a transition from an acoustic sound to a more indie one.

=== Kaptan ===
De Torres currently releases music under the name Kaptan through the label South x Sea Music, a label he started with his friend Brandon Metcalf after they both moved from Seattle, WA to Nashville, TN.

== Discography ==
=== Singles ===
List of singles, with selected chart positions, showing year released and album name
Title	Year	Peak chart positions		Album
Title	Year	Billboard: Uncharted Territory	UK	Album
"All That I Need Is You (feat. Cady Groves)"	2011	–	–	'TBA'

=== Danger Radio ===
Year	Album details
2004	The Difference Between Love and Envy EP: Released: May 21, 2004; Label: I Ate Her Records; Format: CD
2008	Punch Your Lights Out EP: Released: January 29, 2008; Label: Photo Finish Records; Format: CD, DL
2008	Used and Abused: Released: July 8, 2008; Label: Photo Finish Records; Format: CD, DL
2020	The Difference between Love and Envy(album): Released: October 30, 2020; Label: Billy Records; Format: CD, DL

=== The Scene Aesthetic ===
Year	Album details
2006	Building Homes from What We've Known: Released: April 11, 2006; Label: Destiny Worldwide Records; Format: CD
2007	The Scene Aesthetic: Released: July 10, 2007; Label: Destiny Worldwide Records; Format: CD, DL
2009	A Type & a Shadow EP: Released: July 14, 2009; Label: Destiny Worldwide Records; Format: CD
