= Danger Radio =

American rock band

- Origin: Edmonds, Washington, United States
- Genres: Indie rock; pop rock
- Years active: 2003–2011
- Label: Doghouse Records
- Members: Andrew de Torres; Nico Hartikainen; Marvin Kunkel; Andy Brookins; Spencer Phillips; Elan Wright
- Past members: Spencer Mertel; Matt Goodwin; Jackson Kellock; Tyler Brown Williams

Danger Radio (sometimes stylized as Danger: Radio) was an American rock band from Edmonds, Washington.

== Career ==
=== 2003–07: The Difference Between Love and Envy ===
Danger Radio's lead vocalist (Andrew de Torres of The Scene Aesthetic) and drummer (Nico Hartikainen) met in middle school. Soon after, they recruited Marvin Kunkel as bass guitarist so they could play at talent shows and school gigs. Soon after, Matt Goodwin and Spencer Mertel were added to the band, both playing guitars. They recorded a few demos under the name Chasing Tomorrow but later changed the name to Danger Radio before recording their first EP, The Difference Between Love And Envy, which was produced by Casey Bates (Gatsby's American Dream, Portugal.The Man, This Providence). In early 2005, Goodwin and Mertel left the band and were replaced by Andy Brookins and Elan Wright. The keyboard player Jackson Kellock joined soon after, making Danger Radio a six-man band. With the new lineup, Danger Radio in 2005 recorded a demo which included early versions of songs that later appeared on the Punch Your Lights Out EP. The demo was produced by Tom Pfaeffle (Gatsby's American Dream, Kay Kay and His Weathered Underground, Wild Orchid Children).

In late 2006, Jackson left the band and was replaced by Spencer Phillips in 2007. Shortly after, Danger Radio was signed to Photo Finish Records and released an EP, Punch Your Lights Out, in 2007.

=== 2008–11:Used and Abused and slip ===
Their first full-length album, Used and Abused, was released on July 8, 2008, on the Photo Finish label. The album reached No. 17 on the Billboard Heatseekers chart. Danger Radio toured with PlayRadioPlay!, We The Kings, Metro Station, Forever the Sickest Kids, The Maine, The Cab, The Audition and label-mates Envy On the Coast. They also played on the second date of The Bamboozle in both May 2007 and 2008. In 2009, the band covered Britney Spears for their Hoodwink set and also played the second date of The Bamboozle. They were originally scheduled to play on Vans Warped Tour during summer 2008, but dropped out in favor of a tour with Cute Is What We Aim For, Ace Enders and Powerspace, followed by a tour with Meg & Dia, Jonezetta and Dropping Daylight in the fall. Then they went on their first headlining tour with Brighten, Farewell and Red Car Wire. This included three dates in Canada. Later in 2008, they toured with Family Force 5 and PlayRadioPlay!.

Bass guitarist Marvin Kunkel left the band in fall 2008 and was replaced by Tyler Brown Williams for dates with My American Heart, The Morning Of and Artist Vs Poet. Danger Radio supported Forever The Sickest Kids on a UK tour, along with Furthest Drive Home starting February 8, 2009. The band signed with Doghouse Records and released the follow-up to Used and Abused, Nothing's Gonna Hold Us Down, on July 27, 2010.

== Members ==
- Andrew de Torres – vocals (2003–11)
- Nico Hartikainen – drums, programming (2003–11)
- Marvin Kunkel – bass guitar (2003–11)
- Andy Brookins – guitar, vocals (2005–11)
- Spencer Phillips – keyboards (2007–11)
- Elan Wright – guitar, vocals (2005–11)

=== Former members ===
- Spencer Mertel – bass guitar and guitar (2003–2005)
- Matt Goodwin – guitar (2003–2005)
- Jackson Kellock – keyboard (2005–2006)
- Tyler Brown Williams – bass guitar (2008–2009)

== Discography ==
- The Difference Between Love and Envy (2004)
- Punch Your Lights Out EP (Photo Finish Records, 2008)
- Used and Abused (Photo Finish Records, 2008)
- Nothing's Gonna Hold Us Down (Doghouse Records 2010)
