= PureVolume =

Music files streaming Web site

PureVolume (formerly Unborn Media) was a website for uploading and streaming of music files, the first independently run of its type. PureVolume was created by Unborn Media, Inc; Mitchell Pavao; Brett Woitunski; and Nate Hudson, all from the University of Massachusetts.

PureVolume is a website for the discovery and promotion of new music and emerging artists. The mission was to give artists a new promotion tool. Each artist had a profile that typically contains basic info, updates, photos, shows and music for streaming. Artists had the option of making each of their songs available for free download. Listeners and fans were also able to create profiles to interact with artists and each other, as well as track and share music they liked. PureVolume went through several layout changes and a change from orange to blue, but the layout from the homepage to the artist profiles remained essentially the same since 2003.

The focus is on promoting "indie" music groups and artists, but some of them have become popular.

It was acquired by pop culture media conglomerate SpinMedia in 2010.

== History ==
The idea to create PureVolume was that of officer/creator Woitunski after gaining advance knowledge that CNET planned to take mp3.com offline upon acquisition, slated for late 2003. PureVolume.com launched in beta on Thanksgiving Eve of 2003, with 'The Suicide Pact' as the main featured band. Prior to the launch of PureVolume, Unborn Media had designed local business websites in Amherst, Massachusetts. It was thought of as a 'magazine' with sound.

The homepage would have both split of editorial and paid placement, with the content rotating within each spot except the "PurePicks" section, a weekly recommendation of eight new artists for users to enjoy. For all of 2003 and 2004 and the first four months of 2006, that was Welch's task. It was taken over by both Brett and Mike, and the distinct musical taste gave the homepage a new feel and began a new chapter for the brand.

More predominantly in the site's early years, indie labels looked to the site for new artists, the "PurePicks" were put out each week. After two weeks in the section, Gym Class Heroes were in a meeting with Fueled by Ramen Records, the first band to be 'discovered' on PureVolume, which opened a new chapter in the world of music.

On June 30, 2018, PureVolume shut down its music service.

== Influence ==
Record labels used PureVolume to promote their artists and even looked for new ones to sign. The first artists to link a record deal directly to their PureVolume page were the Gym Class Heroes. The fame of groups such as Paramore, Boys Like Girls, Fall Out Boy, All Time Low, He Is We, My American Heart, Daphne Loves Derby, Taking Back Sunday, My Chemical Romance, Forever The Sickest Kids, Panic! at the Disco, Twenty One Pilots, Brand New, The Scene Aesthetic and The Spin Room have been credited to exposure on PureVolume.
