= Hawthorne Heights discography =

- Studio albums: 9
- Extended plays: 8
- Compilation albums: 2
- Singles: 21
- Music videos: 21

The following is the discography of Hawthorne Heights is an American rock band formed in 2001. The band was originally named A Day in the Life, and is from Dayton, Ohio. Their line-up currently consists of lead singer and rhythm guitarist JT Woodruff, lead guitarist and screaming vocalist Mark McMillon and bassist and backing vocalist Matt Ridenour. Hawthorne Heights found success with both of their first two albums released through Victory Records. Their 2004 release, The Silence in Black and White, and their album, If Only You Were Lonely, both achieved Gold certification by the RIAA. Their second album additionally peaked at #1 on Billboard Independent Albums chart and #3 on the Billboard 200 charts. The two lead singles from their 2004 debut album, "Ohio Is for Lovers" and "Niki FM" both charted on Billboard's Alternative Songs chart. They are also well known for their 2006 single "Saying Sorry", which reached Gold status and peaked at #7 on the Billboard Hot Modern Rock Tracks chart. Hawthorne Heights third album, Fragile Future, placed at #23 on the Billboard 200. Their next album, Skeletons, was released through Wind-up Records. It peaked at #50 on the Billboard 200.

== Albums ==
=== Studio albums ===
List of studio albums, with selected chart positions
| Title | Details | Peak chart positions | | | | Certifications (sales threshold) |
| Title | Details | US | US Indie | UK | UK Indie | Certifications (sales threshold) |
|---|---|---|---|---|---|---|
| Nine Reasons to Say Goodbye | Released: November 26, 2001; Label: Confined; Format: CD, DL, LP | — | — | — | — | |
| The Silence in Black and White | Released: June 8, 2004; Label: Victory; Format: CD, DL, LP | 56 | 3 | — | — | RIAA: Gold |
| If Only You Were Lonely | Released: February 28, 2006; Label: Victory; Format: CD, DL, LP | 3 | 1 | 85 | — | RIAA: Gold |
| Fragile Future | Released: August 5, 2008; Label: Victory; Format: CD, DL, LP | 23 | 4 | — | 13 | |
| Skeletons | Released: June 1, 2010; Label: Wind-up; Format: CD, DL, LP | 50 | — | — | — | |
| Zero | Released: June 25, 2013; Label: Red; Format: CD, DL, LP | 118 | 35 | — | — | |
| Bad Frequencies | Released: April 27, 2018; Label: Pure Noise; Format: CD, DL, LP | — | 10 | — | — | |
| The Rain Just Follows Me | Released: September 10, 2021; Label: Pure Noise; Format: CD, DL, LP | — | — | — | — | |
"—" denotes a recording that did not chart or was not released in that territory.

=== Re-recorded albums ===
List of re-recorded albums
| Title | Details |
|---|---|
| The Silence in Black and White Acoustic | Released: April 15, 2014; Label: Cardboard Empire, InVogue; Format: CD, DL, LP |
| If Only You Were Lonely XV | Released: December 1, 2023; Label: Skeleton Club; Format: DL, LP |

=== Compilation albums ===
List of compilation albums
| Title | Details |
|---|---|
| Midwesterners: The Hits | Released: November 9, 2010; Label: Victory; Format: CD, DL |
| Lost Frequencies | Released: November 8, 2019; Label: Pure Noise; Format: CD, DL |

== Extended plays ==
List of extended plays
| Title | Details |
|---|---|
| Paper Chromatography: The Fade From Dark to Light | Released: 2003; Label: Self-released; Format: CD |
| Rhapsody Originals | Released: August 26, 2008; Label: Victory; Format: DL |
| Hate | Released: August 23, 2011; Label: Cardboard Empire; Format: CD, DL, 12" vinyl |
| Stripped Down to the Bone | Released: April 1, 2012; Label: Cardboard Empire; Format: CD, DL |
| Hope | Released: June 5, 2012; Label: Cardboard Empire; Format: CD, DL, 12" vinyl |
| Hurt | Released: September 18, 2015; Label: Self-released; Format: CD, CS, DL, 12" vinyl |
| Ohio Is for Covers | Released: September 18, 2015; Label: Self-released; Format: DL; Note: All songs found here reissued on Lost Frequencies |
| Lost Lights | Released: September 8, 2023; Label: Pure Noise; Format: DL, CD |
| Sandpaper and Silk | Released: January 10, 2025; Label: Skeleton Club; Format: DL |

== Other appearances ==
| Release date | Title | Track | Label |
|---|---|---|---|
| January 11, 2005 | Elektra: The Album | "Angels With Even Filthier Souls" | Wind-up Records |
| January 10, 2006 | Underworld: Evolution: Original Motion Picture Soundtrack | "Where Do I Stab Myself in the Ears (The Legion of Doom remix)" | Lakeshore Entertainment |
| July 10, 2007 | MySpace Tribute To The Smashing Pumpkins | "Bullet with Butterfly Wings" | MySpace Records |
| October 25, 2011 | Come As You Are: A 20th Anniversary Tribute To Nirvana's 'Nevermind' | "Lithium" | Reimagine Music |

== Singles ==
| Title | Year | Peak chart positions | | | Certifications | Album |
| Title | Year | US Alt | UK | UK Rock | Certifications | Album |
|---|---|---|---|---|---|---|
| "Ohio Is for Lovers" | 2005 | 34 | — | — | RIAA: Gold | The Silence in Black and White |
| "Niki FM" | 2005 | 40 | — | — | | The Silence in Black and White |
| "Silver Bullet" | 2005 | — | — | — | | The Silence in Black and White |
| "Saying Sorry" | 2006 | 7 | 87 | 38 | | If Only You Were Lonely |
| "This Is Who We Are" | 2006 | — | — | — | | If Only You Were Lonely |
| "Pens and Needles" | 2006 | — | — | — | | If Only You Were Lonely |
| "Rescue Me" | 2008 | — | — | — | | Fragile Future |
| "Somewhere in Between" | 2008 | — | — | — | | Fragile Future |
| "Nervous Breakdown" | 2010 | — | — | — | | Skeletons |
| "Drive" | 2010 | — | — | — | | Skeletons |
| "Bring You Back" | 2010 | — | — | — | | Skeletons |
| "New Winter" | 2012 | — | — | — | | Hope |
| "Golden Parachutes" | 2013 | — | — | — | | Zero |
| "Taken by the Dark" | 2013 | — | — | — | | Zero |
| "The Darkest Times" | 2015 | — | — | — | | Hurt |
| "Push Me Away" | 2017 | — | — | — | | Bad Frequencies |
| "Pink Hearts" | 2018 | — | — | — | | Bad Frequencies |
| "Just Another Ghost" | 2018 | — | — | — | | Bad Frequencies |
| "Hard to Breathe" | 2019 | — | — | — | | Lost Frequencies |
| "Constant Dread" (feat. Brendan Murphy of Counterparts) | 2021 | — | — | — | | The Rain Just Follows Me |
| "Lucerne Valley" | 2023 | — | — | — | | Lost Lights |

== Videography ==
=== Video albums ===
List of video albums
| Title | Details |
|---|---|
| This Is Who We Are | Released: January 10, 2006; Label: Victory; Format: DVD-V |

=== Music videos ===
- "Ohio Is for Lovers" (director: Shane Drake)
- "Niki FM" (director: Major Lightner)
- "Saying Sorry" (director: Major Lightner)
- "This Is Who We Are"
- "Pens and Needles" (director: Dale Resteghini)
- "Rescue Me" (director: Adam Neustadter)
- "Somewhere in Between"
- "Nervous Breakdown" (director: Walter Robot)
- "Gravestones"
- "Is This What You Wanted?"
- "Four White Walls"
- "Golden Parachutes" (director: Terry Corso)
- "Just Another Ghost" (director: Benny Gagliardi)
- "Hard to Breathe"
- "Constant Dread"
- "Tired and Alone"
- "Spray Paint It Black"
- "Dandelions"
- "The Storm" (director: J.T. Ibanez)
- "Like A Cardinal"
- "Carry Me"
