= Midwesterners: The Hits =

Greatest hits album by Hawthorne Heights
- Released: November 9, 2010
- Recorded: 2004–2008
- Genre: Post-hardcore, pop punk, emo, alternative rock
- Label: Victory

Hawthorne Heights chronology
Skeletons (2010)	Midwesterners: The Hits (2010)	Hate (2011)

Midwesterners: The Hits is the first greatest hits album of songs composed by American rock band Hawthorne Heights. It was released on November 9, 2010, through Victory Records, without contribution from the band. The compilation is Victory's last release of material by Hawthorne Heights, and contains 16 of the band's favorite and most notable tracks that have already been released through their past albums with the record label.

Hawthorne Heights' most recent studio album, Skeletons, was released through their new label, Wind-up Records.

There is a notable typographical error on the back cover of the jewel casing where they have misspelled the word "Angels" as "Angles". It is not known how many copies of this release have the typographical error or if it will even be reissued with the typographical error corrected in the future.

== Track list ==
from The Silence in Black and White
No.	Title	Length
1.	"Life on Standby"	4:11
2.	"The Transition"	4:04
3.	"Silver Bullet"	4:03
4.	"Ohio Is for Lovers"	4:04
5.	"Niki FM"	3:59

from If Only You Were Lonely
No.	Title	Length
6.	"Saying Sorry"	3:07
7.	"This Is Who We Are"	3:45
8.	"Dead In the Water"	3:51
9.	"Where Can I Stab Myself in the Ears?"	3:42
10.	"Pens and Needles"	3:15

from Fragile Future
No.	Title	Length
11.	"Rescue Me"	3:08
12.	"Somewhere in Between"	3:22
13.	"Come Back Home"	4:11
14.	"Four Becomes One"	3:55

from The Silence in Black and White re-issue
No.	Title	Length
15.	"Silver Bullet" (Acoustic in the studio)	4:59

from Elektra: The Album
No.	Title	Length
16.	"Angels With Even Filthier Souls" (Written as A Day in the Life)	3:35

== Personnel ==
- JT Woodruff – Lead vocals, piano, rhythm guitar
- Micah Carli – Lead guitar
- Matt Ridenour – Bass, backing vocals
- Eron Bucciarelli – Drums, percussion
- Casey Calvert – Rhythm guitar, death growls (excluding tracks from Fragile Future)
- Grace Carli – Backing vocals (for the track "The Transition")
