= The Rain Just Follows Me =

Studio album by Hawthorne Heights
- Released: September 10, 2021
- Studio: Maple Sound Studios
- Genres: Pop-punk, emo, alternative rock, post-hardcore
- Length: 36:29
- Label: Pure Noise
- Producer: Cameron Webb

Hawthorne Heights chronology
Bad Frequencies (2018)	The Rain Just Follows Me (2021)	Lost Lights (2023)

Singles from The Rain Just Follows Me
- 1. "Constant Dread" Released: July 19, 2021; 2. "The Rain Just Follows Me" Released: August 9, 2021; 3. "Thunder In Our Hearts" Released: August 30, 2021; 4. "Tired And Alone" Released: September 9, 2021; 5. "Spray Paint it Black" Released: September 1, 2022

The Rain Just Follows Me is the seventh studio album by American rock band Hawthorne Heights. The album was released on September 10, 2021, through Pure Noise Records. The album was preceded by four singles, "Constant Dread" (featuring Brendan Murphy), "The Rain Just Follows Me", "Thunder in Our Hearts", and "Tired And Alone". "Spray Paint It Black" (featuring Anthony Raneri) was released after the album's full release.

== Background, composition, and production ==
Rhythm guitarist and lead vocalist JT Woodruff said that the album was written prior to the COVID-19 pandemic and contained lyrical themes that could be interpreted as pandemic or post-apocalyptic. Woodruff also said that the writing of the album was affected by the physical toll of touring, where he would develop nightly panic attacks and exhaustion. He said that the album was written while the band was on tour between soundchecks and rehearsals. He also said that the album was about "all of that stuff is really just about us, and about our band, and our career, and the dark roads that we've had to take sometimes".

The album's lead single, "Constant Dread", follows the entire album's theme of searching for identity and trying to reach a positive state of mind.

Woodruff said that despite having dark themes, the album's main intent was to project positivity, saying "I hope this record helps people understand that others out there are thinking like them—and thinking about them. Everyone gets poured on in life. We just want to provide an umbrella."

The album is considered to be in the pop-punk, emo, post-hardcore, and alternative rock genres. While writing the album, Woodruff said he questioned the identity of the band, after having been active for nearly 20 years, saying "Are we a heavy band with melodic vocals, or are we a pop-punk band with screaming?". He also said that through the process of writing the album, the band was separating the songs more than they realized, with some belonging to the pop-punk genre and others being heavier tracks.

== Release and reception ==
The lead single from the album, "Constant Dread", featuring Brendan Murphy from Counterparts was released on July 19, 2021, with a music video. Other album tracks released prior to the album are "The Rain Just Follows Me", "Thunder In Our Hearts", and "Tired And Alone". One song from the album, "Spray Paint It Black" featuring Anthony Raneri from Bayside, was released with a music video after the album's release

Professional ratings
Review scores
Source	Rating
Kerrang!	3/5
AltCorner	Mixed
Rockfreaks	Positive

The album was released on Pure Noise Records on streaming as well as vinyl, with limited-edition vinyl variants being released on October 22, 2021.

The album received a 3/5 rating from Kerrang! with a review written by Aliya Chaudhry saying that the album had a good mix of soft and heavy songs and praised the featured artists. The review, however, criticized the album for a lack of full delivery on choruses and also a lack of standout songs, saying "The Rain Just Follows Me is an easy listen and an album that showcases the band's range and skill, but there's not much that makes it stand out from, or even hold up to, the rest of the band's work."

On AltCorner, the album was praised for its melodic side but criticized for McMillon's screaming vocals, an underwhelming lead single in "Constant Dread" (as well as a lack overall of standout songs). However, "Tired And Alone", "Holy Coast", "Palm Canyon Drive", "Spray Paint It Black", and "Seafoam" were praised, with the latter two receiving praise for the featured vocals from Anthony Raneri and Ryan Key respectively. The album was praised as a run-of-the-mill album for the band but not their strongest work, saying "They're never going to make a magnum opus now, and that's alright."

On a review by staff member Petteri Pertola on Rockfreaks, the album received a more positive review, with praise going to its variation between soft and loud song dynamics as well as its mix of clean and screamed vocals. McMillon's screaming vocals were also praised, with the review placing it above former lead guitarist and unclean vocalist Micah Carli. The album was also praised for its nostalgic sound and compared to bands like Anberlin, Armor for Sleep, and Senses Fail. Pertola wrote that "Your opinion on "The Rain Just Follows Me" will likely depend on whether you liked Hawthorne Heights in the first place", saying that the album is the band's best release since 2013's Hate EP, but that it will not make any people who dislike the band like it.

== Track listing ==
All tracks are written by James Woodruff, Mark McMillon, Chris Popadak, and Matthew Ridenour.

The Rain Just Follows Me track listing
No.	Title	Length
1.	"Constant Dread" (featuring Brendan Murphy)	2:52
2.	"The Rain Just Follows Me"	3:11
3.	"Holy Coast"	3:42
4.	"Tired and Alone"	4:05
5.	"Thunder in Our Hearts"	3:45
6.	"Spray Paint It Black" (featuring Anthony Raneri)	3:18
7.	"Dull Headlights"	3:06
8.	"Palm Canyon Drive"	2:43
9.	"Seafoam" (featuring Ryan Key)	2:36
10.	"Words Can't Hurt"	3:25
11.	"Bambarra Beach (The End)"	3:42
Total length:		36:29

== Personnel ==
Credits from Tidal

Hawthorne Heights

- JT Woodruff – lead vocals, rhythm guitar
- Mark McMillon – lead guitar, backing vocals, unclean vocals
- Matt Ridenour – bass, backing vocals
- Chris Popadak – drums, percussion

Additional musicians

- Brendan Murphy – guest vocals (1)
- Anthony Raneri – guest vocals (6)
- William Ryan Key – guest vocals (9)

Production and design

- Cameron Webb – producer, engineer, mixing
- Sergio Chaves – engineer
- Ryan Smith – mastering
- Jessie Jay – artwork
- Mike Ski – artwork
- True Hand – artwork
