= Central-Western Region =

Central-Western Region or Central West Region can refer to:

- Central-West Region, Brazil
- Central-Western Region, Venezuela
- Central West Queensland, a region of Australia
- Central West (New South Wales), a region of Australia

== See also ==
- Central West
- Midwest (disambiguation)
