= Rhapsody Originals =

Rhapsody Originals may refer to:

- Rhapsody Originals (Brandi Carlile EP), 2007
- Rhapsody Originals (Big & Rich EP), 2007
- Rhapsody Originals (Hawthorne Heights EP), 2008
- Rhapsody Originals, a 2007 album by Taylor Swift
- Rhapsody Originals, a 2008 album by P.O.D.
