= Hurt (EP) =

EP by Hawthorne Heights
- Released: September 18, 2015
- Genre: Emo, alternative rock, post-hardcore, screamo
- Length: 27:52
- Label: Cardboard Empire
- Producer: Hawthorne Heights

Hawthorne Heights chronology
Zero (2013)	Hurt (2015)	Bad Frequencies (2018)

Singles from Hurt
- 1. "The Darkest Times" Released: August 26, 2015

Hurt is the fourth extended play by American emo band Hawthorne Heights, released on September 18, 2015. It is the third and final EP in the Hate/Hope/Hurt trilogy.

== Track listing ==
No.	Title	Length
1.	"There Was a Kid, Part 3"	1:38
2.	"The Darkest Times"	3:40
3.	"Common Crook"	3:13
4.	"Beneath the Silver Strand"	3:51
5.	"Hurt"	3:37
6.	"Young Again"	3:32
7.	"Tail Lights"	3:21
8.	"Bury My Bones at Crystal Cove"	4:49

== Personnel ==
Hawthorne Heights

- JT Woodruff – lead vocals, rhythm guitar
- Mark McMillion – lead guitar, unclean vocals, backing vocals
- Matt Ridenour – bass, backing vocals

Additional musicians

- Christopher Lee "Poppy" Popadak – drums, backing vocals
