= Say Goodnight, Sleep Alone =

Studio album by Ellison
- Released: August 22, 2006
- Genre: Alternative rock
- Length: 45:00
- Label: Carbon Copy Media
- Producer: Mitch Wyatt

Ellison chronology
Indecisive and Halfhearted (2005)	Say Goodnight, Sleep Alone (2006)	Color of Compassion (2008)

Say Goodnight, Sleep Alone is the first full-length album from Ellison, released in 2006. Using Josh Hill's basement as their recording studio, the album came together in three months. The band chose four songs from the EP and developed seven new songs in the studio. Each band member had equal creative input, allowing the songs to evolve throughout the recording process. Hill explains, "Generally I write a song and bring it to Mitch, J.D., and Ian so they can write their own parts. But with a couple of the new songs, the structure became a collaborative effort and these turned out to be some of my favorite Ellison songs."

== Track listing ==
No.	Title	Writer(s)	Length
1.	"Joanna, Open Your Eyes"	Josh Hill, Ian Bolender, J.D. Carlson, Mitch Wyatt	3:39
2.	"Following You"	Hill, Bolender, Carlson, Wyatt	3:35
3.	"Holiday Drive-In"	Hill, Bolender, Carlson, Wyatt	3:50
4.	"Your Goodbyes"	Hill, Bolender, Carlson, Wyatt	3:41
5.	"Say Goodnight, Sleep Alone"	Hill, Bolender, Carlson, Wyatt	4:34
6.	"Give In"	Hill, Bolender, Carlson, Wyatt	3:16
7.	"June"	Hill, Bolender, Carlson, Wyatt	4:31
8.	"Love Takes and Breaks"	Hill, Bolender, Carlson, Wyatt	3:42
9.	"Leaving Tomorrow"	Hill, Bolender, Carlson, Wyatt	2:51
10.	"Tired of Pretending"	Hill, Bolender, Carlson, Wyatt	5:15
11.	"Short Love"	Hill, Bolender, Carlson, Wyatt	6:33

== Personnel ==
- Josh Hill – vocals, guitar, synth
- Ian Bolender – guitar
- J.D. Carlson – bass, backing vocals
- Mitch Wyatt – drums, percussion
