= Ellison (band) =

American indie rock band

- Origin: Cincinnati, Ohio, USA
- Genres: Indie rock
- Years active: 2003–present
- Label: Carbon Copy Media
- Members: Josh Hill; Ian Bolender; Kent Landvatter; Stefan Wright
- Past members: J.D. Carlson; Mitch Wyatt

Ellison is an indie rock band from Cincinnati, Ohio, signed to Carbon Copy Media. What started as a recording project quickly manifested into a full band operation. In 2005 they released their first EP titled "Indecisive and Halfhearted," and in 2006 their first full-length CD, "Say Goodnight, Sleep Alone."

== History ==
Josh Hill, a local songwriter, attempted to follow up his 2002 acoustic release “No More Words” with a series of songs with full band arrangements. High School friend Mitch Wyatt teamed up with Josh to produce a three-song demo. After playing a few shows with stand-in musicians, the two quickly realized the potential of a collective band. Following the recruitment of bassist, JD Carlson, the three became known as Ellison. In June 2005 the trio stumbled across the band's newest member, Ian Bolender.

Their 2005 EP ("Indecisive and Halfhearted") and constant regional live shows caught the attention of J.T. Woodruff, lead singer of the gold record-selling band Hawthorne Heights. Woodruff launched his own record label, Carbon Copy Media, and in early 2006 signed Ellison as the first band to his fledgling label.

== Say Goodnight, Sleep Alone ==
Ellison's first full-length album, "Say Goodnight, Sleep Alone" was released on August 22, 2006, with the record label Carbon Copy Media and distributed by Victory Records.

== 20 Year Anniversary of SGSA Show ==
Ellison is reuniting to perform an anniversary show on August 22, 2026 at the Southgate House Revival. Josh Hill, Ian Bolender, Kent Landvatter, Stefan Wright will all perform along with Kile Yurchak on the keys.

== Members ==
- Josh Hill – vocals, guitar
- Ian Bolender – guitar
- Kent Landvatter – bass, backing vocals
- Stefan Wright – drums, percussion

== Past members ==
- Mitch Wyatt – drums, percussion, backing vocals
- J.D. Carlson – bass, backing vocals

== Discography ==
=== Studio albums ===
| Title | Album details |
|---|---|
| Say Goodnight, Sleep Alone | Released: August 22, 2006; Label: Carbon Copy Media; Format: digital download |
| Color of Compassion | Released: June 3, 2008; Label: Independent; Format: digital download |
| Brighter Than Sunlight | Released: August 20, 2012; Label: Independent; Format: digital download |

=== EPs ===
| Title | Album details |
|---|---|
| Indecisive and Halfhearted | Released: July, 2005; Label: Independent; Format: digital download |

=== Compilations ===
- Punk the Clock, Volume III: Property of a Gentleman (2007)
