= Brighter Than Sunlight =

Studio album by Ellison
- Released: August 20, 2012
- Genre: Pop rock
- Length: 52:40
- Label: Independent

Ellison chronology
Color of Compassion (2008)	Brighter Than Sunlight (2012)

Brighter Than Sunlight is the third full-length album from the band, Ellison, released for digital download in 2012. Ellison worked on Brighter Than Sunlight for over three years, finally releasing it four years after their last album, Color of Compassion, was released.

== Track listing ==
No.	Title	Writer(s)	Length
1.	"Hearts Grow Old"	Josh Hill, Ian Bolender, Kent Landvatter, Stefan Wright	4:10
2.	"We’ve Got Each Other"	Hill, Bolender, Landvatter, Wright	3:41
3.	"Pascal"	Hill, Bolender, Landvatter, Wright	3:42
4.	"Our Love Doesn't Need a Holiday"	Hill, Bolender, Landvatter, Wright	4:11
5.	"Brighter Than Sunlight"	Hill, Bolender, Landvatter, Wright	4:46
6.	"Big Citi(E)s"	Hill, Bolender, Landvatter, Wright	3:22
7.	"The Law of Intertia"	Hill, Bolender, Landvatter, Wright	4:10
8.	"Keeping Me Company"	Hill, Bolender, Landvatter, Wright	5:08
9.	"Forget California"	Hill, Bolender, Landvatter, Wright	4:17
10.	"Shorelines (OBX)"	Hill, Bolender, Landvatter, Wright	2:45
11.	"Everyone (Bonus Track)"	Hill, Bolender, Landvatter, Wright	5:31
12.	"Big Citi(E)s (Acoustic)"	Hill, Bolender, Landvatter, Wright	3:20
13.	"We've Got Each Other (Acoustic)"	Hill, Bolender, Landvatter, Wright	3:37

== Personnel ==
- Josh Hill – vocals, guitar, synth
- Ian Bolender – guitar
- Kent Landvatter – bass, backing vocals
- Stefan Wright – drums, percussion
