= Midwest (disambiguation) =

The Midwest, or Midwestern United States, is a region of the United States.

Mid West or Midwest may also refer to:

== Airlines ==
- Air Midwest, based in the U.S. state of Kansas, subsidiary of Mesa, closed in 2008
- Midwest Airlines, based in the U.S. state of Wisconsin, merged into Frontier Airlines in 2011
- Midwest Airlines (Egypt)

== Music ==
- Midwest (album), by Mathias Eick, 2015
- Midwesterners: The Hits, a greatest hits album by Hawthorne Heights

== Places ==
- Mid West (Western Australia)
- Mid-Western Region, Nepal
- Mid-Western Region, Nigeria
- Mid-West Region, Ireland
- Midwest, Wyoming, a community in the U.S. state of Wyoming

== Other uses ==
- Mid Western University, a public university located in Birendranagar, Surkhet, Nepal

== See also ==
- Central West (disambiguation)
