= Indecisive and Halfhearted =

Indecisive and Halfhearted EP

EP by Ellison
- Released: July 2005
- Genre: Alternative rock
- Length: 25:19
- Label: Independent
- Producer: Mitch Wyatt

Ellison chronology
Indecisive and Halfhearted EP (2005)	Say Goodnight, Sleep Alone (2006)

Indecisive and Halfhearted was the first EP released by Ellison. It was recorded and mixed by drummer Mitch Wyatt, and self-released, but was of studio quality. The EP and constant regional live shows caught the attention of J.T. Woodruff, lead singer of Hawthorne Heights. Woodruff launched his own record label, Carbon Copy Media and in early 2006, signed Ellison as the first band to his fledgling label.

== Track listing ==
- All songs written and composed by Ellison
1. "Your Goodbyes" – 3:42
2. "Following You" – 3:38
3. "More At Ease" – 3:43
4. "Simple Request" – 3:45
5. "Tired of Pretending" – 5:29
6. "Short Love" – 5:02

== Personnel ==
- Josh Hill – vocals, guitar, synth
- Ian Bolender – guitar
- JD Carlson – bass, backing vocals
- Mitch Wyatt – drums, percussion
