= Skeletons (Hawthorne Heights album) =

Studio album by Hawthorne Heights
- Released: June 1, 2010
- Recorded: May 2009–2010
- Genre: Post-hardcore; emo; pop-punk; alternative rock
- Length: 42:04
- Label: Wind-up
- Producer: Howard Benson

Hawthorne Heights chronology
Fragile Future (2008)	Skeletons (2010)	Midwesterners: The Hits (2010)

Singles from Skeletons
- 1. "Nervous Breakdown" Released: April 27, 2010; 2. "Drive" Released: May 18, 2010; 3. "Bring You Back" Released: September 28, 2010

Skeletons is the fourth studio album by American rock band Hawthorne Heights, released June 1, 2010. It is their first and only album to be released through Wind-up Records, and is also the first release since If Only You Were Lonely to employ screamed vocals, with guitarist Micah Carli adding limited vocals into select tracks on the record. The album was produced by Howard Benson. The album peaked at number 50 on the Billboard 200.

== Background ==
On February 2, 2009, it was announced that the band had signed to independent label Wind-up Records and would release their next album with the label later in the year. Drummer Eron Bucciarelli said Wind-up Records was "still an indie [label] but with the power of a major [label]. ... Its a tight knit group who still truly put the music first and that's comforting to us." Vocalist/guitarist JT Woodruff said the band was "extremely happy" to be signed to Wind-up Records. In addition, he said it was important to the group that they signed with "a label that has maintained a consistent staff and who understands who we want to be as Hawthorne Heights." Bucciarelli mentioned that the band had been working on their next album since May 2008. Four days later, the band made a blog post about their forthcoming album. They said they were "going to hit the studio and release the album as soon as possible without compromising the quality of the songs."

== Production ==
On May 1, 2009, the band announced they were going to Hollywood, California for the course of two months to record their next album. In addition, they revealed that while there is not a new member and no replacement was made for former guitarist/vocalist, Casey Calvert, the new album would feature a new "screamer". While on tour, Hawthorne Heights announced that Micah Carli would now be providing vocals for the band.

As the album was being recorded, Woodruff and Bucciarelli named two songs from the record on several occasions, leading many to believe that they would be released as singles. Acoustic versions of the two songs were also said to have been recorded. The songs are entitled "Here I Am" and "Nervous Breakdown". On October 2, 2009, both Woodruff and Buicarelli posted updates on their Twitter pages saying that they had just finished gang vocals for the record. Woodruff stated "Just finished up doing gang vocals on a few songs. Return to hardcore!"

The band has expressed that the process of writing the music and lyrics to this album has been different from doing so for albums past. Woodruff states: "We had the luxury of time to sit around and think about what we wanted to do, which helped us create something new." Bucciarelli adds: "We wrote more songs for this album than ever before. We wrote over 30, then whittled them down to the absolute best ones. We took parts from some and added them to others and made a Frankenstein out of [th]em. We were always writing, re-writing, arranging and re-arranging. Howard Benson really pushed us in the song writing department to go against what we’ve done in the past."

== Album title ==
The album's title is not taken from any of the tracks' titles, or even lyrical content on the album (although "End of the Underground" does make lyrical references to skeletons); instead, Woodruff explained:

This album sounds like us, but we were able to grow our sound. We took it down to the essentials, the skeleton of who we are as a band. We then tried on some new skins, and added the flesh and blood. We're just excited to play these new songs and see how people react to them.

Thus, the album was given the name Skeletons.

== Release ==
In October 2009, the band announced that they would be releasing their next album in early 2010. Following this, they embarked on the Never sleep Again tour with Just Surrender, Monty Are I, Punchline, Anarbor and Nightbeast. During this trek, download cards for the song "Unforgivable" were made available. On February 10, 2010, Skeletons was announced for release in three months' time. Following this, the band played select shows of the SnoCore Tour in Canada. On March 22, 2010, "Nervous Breakdown" was posted online; it was released to radio on April 27. On April 23, 2010, "End of the Underground" was made available for listening on Buzznet. On May 18, "Drive" was released as a digital single through Rhapsody. The track was made available for download from Verizon as a ringtone on May 20. On May 26, 2010, Skeletons was made available for streaming through Myspace. On May 28, "Nervous Breakdown (Acoustic)" was made available as a free download separate from Skeletons. Between late May and early July, the group went on tour with the Audition and the Story Changes. Skeletons was released on June 1 through Wind-up Records. An animated music video was released for "Nervous Breakdown" on June 8, 2010. On September 28, "Bring You Back" was declared a single by Hawthorne Heights on their official website, and began receiving regular radio airplay.

== Reviews and reception ==
Professional ratings
Review scores
Source	Rating
AbsolutePunk	(83%)
Allmusic	3.5/5 stars
BLARE Magazine	3/5 stars
Bring On Mixed Reviews	2.5/5 stars
RoomThirteen	12/13 stars
Sputnikmusic	2/5
idobi	3.5/5 stars

Skeletons has received generally positive reviews. A review on the AbsolutePunk website has stated that the album brings out "JT Woodruff’s best vocal performance yet," and is full of "killer choruses."

In an early review of the album, RoomThirteen.com gave the album a 12 out of 13 rating. They stated "For those who fell in love with Hawthorne Heights six years ago, ‘Skeletons’ will merely reaffirm their passion for a band that has survived so much in such a short time. For those who have yet to truly listen to the band, this is an album that will alter your perceptions."

Skeletons stylistically reverts to "music similar to their first two albums", although it has substantially less non-singing vocals. The album "refuses to stomp over old ground" by incorporating "electro" and "pop punk" elements into a few of the tracks. Other reviewers, though, criticize the album by calling it "safe", and saying that it doesn't take any "deviations from the beaten path."

== Track listing ==
All lyrics are written by JT Woodruff; all music is composed by Hawthorne Heights.

No.	Title	Length
1.	"Bring You Back"	3:26
2.	"Nervous Breakdown"	2:55
3.	"End of the Underground"	3:19
4.	"Drive"	3:10
5.	"Gravestones"	3:30
6.	"Broken Man"	2:52
7.	"Last Few Words"	3:04
8.	"Abandoned Driveways"	2:42
9.	"Picket Fences"	4:11
10.	"Here I Am"	3:10
11.	"Hollywood & Vine"	2:46
12.	"Unforgivable"	3:29
13.	"Boy"	3:45

iTunes Bonus Tracks
No.	Title	Length
14.	"Watching and Waiting"	4:11
15.	"This Will Be Televised [Pre-Order Only]"	3:05

Summer Tour Bonus Track
No.	Title	Length
14.	"Gravestones (Acoustic)"	3:30

== Personnel ==
Hawthorne Heights

- JT Woodruff – lead vocals, piano, rhythm guitar
- Micah Carli – lead guitar, unclean vocals
- Matt Ridenour – bass, backing vocals
- Eron Bucciarelli – drums, percussion

Production

- Album produced by Howard Benson
- Album art created by Mike Egan
- Album mastering by Scott Hull

== Charts ==
Chart performance
Chart (2010)	Peak position
US Billboard 200	50
US Indie Store Album Sales (Billboard)	23
US Top Alternative Albums (Billboard)	11
US Top Rock Albums (Billboard)	14
