= Nine Reasons to Say Goodbye =

Studio album by A Day in The Life
- Released: November 26, 2001
- Genre: Emo, indie rock
- Length: 22:30
- Label: Confined/Carbon Copy Media (Re-release)

A Day in The Life chronology
Nine Reasons to Say Goodbye (2001)	Paper Chromatography: The Fade From Dark To Light (2003)

Professional ratings
Review scores
Source	Rating
Allmusic	3/5 stars

Nine Reasons to Say Goodbye is an album by the rock band A Day in the Life. It was released on Confined Records in 2001 and is the only album by the band before their name change to Hawthorne Heights. It features nine tracks as well as their entire original lineup.

It was re-released in 2005 by Carbon Copy Media with a second disc that contains songs by four other bands who were signed to Carbon Copy Media, plus two other songs by A Day in the Life.

The album cover is lead vocalist JT Woodruff taking a selfie in a bathroom mirror.

== Track listing ==
1. "The Death of a Dream" - 0:48
2. "Control Alt Delete" - 2:15
3. "Do You Have a Map, Because I'm Lost in Your Eyes" - 3:08
4. "The Girl That Destroyed Me" - 2:34
5. "Candycanes and Cola" - 3:06
6. "Audrey in Sacramento" - 2:41
7. "Photograph" - 2:27
8. "Until Her Heart Stops" - 2:56
9. "I'm Not Crying, My Eyeballs Are Sweating" - 2:35

== Re-release track listing ==
=== Disc 1 ===
1. "The Death of a Dream" - 0:48
2. "Control Alt Delete" - 2:15
3. "Do You Have a Map, Because I'm Lost in Your Eyes" - 3:08
4. "The Girl That Destroyed Me" - 2:34
5. "Candycanes and Cola" - 3:06
6. "Audrey in Sacramento" - 2:39
7. "Photograph" - 2:27
8. "Until Her Heart Stops" - 2:56
9. "I'm Not Crying, My Eyeballs Are Sweating" - 2:35

=== Disc 2 ===
1. Brighten: "Ready When You Are" - 3:19
2. Brighten: "The Better Way" - 3:46
3. Ivory: "Don't Go" - 3:19
4. Ivory: "Coast of Maine" - 4:03
5. Ellison: "Your Goodbyes" - 3:40
6. Ellison: "Following You" - 3:36
7. Asteria: "Drink Life to the Lees" - 3:09
8. Asteria: "A Lesson in Charades" - 3:42
9. A Day in the Life: "The Girl That Destroyed Me" - 2:32
10. A Day in the Life: "Control Alt Delete" - 2:13
