= Fragile Future =

Studio album by Hawthorne Heights
- Released: August 5, 2008
- Recorded: 2007
- Studio: Hype Dance
- Genres: Emo, alternative rock, pop-punk
- Length: 43:23
- Label: Victory
- Producers: Jeff Schneeweis, Hawthorne Heights

Hawthorne Heights chronology
If Only You Were Lonely (2006)	Fragile Future (2008)	Skeletons (2010)

Singles from Fragile Future
- 1. "Rescue Me" Released: July 22, 2008; 2. "Somewhere in Between" Released: 2008

Fragile Future is the third studio album by Hawthorne Heights.

== Background ==
On August 7, 2006, it was announced that the band had left Victory Records, citing a lack of royalty payment and filed a lawsuit against them. On December 6, the band announced they had written 11 songs for a new album. In May 2007, a judge declared that the band could record albums for any record label. However, the band's contract required them to release another two albums through Victory Records. In May 2007, a demo, titled "Come Back Home", was made available for streaming. By this point, the group had written 23 songs. They went on a month-long trek across the US with From First to Last, Secondhand Serenade, Brighten, and Powerspace, and then appeared on that year's Warped Tour. Following this, they began recording their third album. Sessions were held at Hype Dance Studio in Chico, California, with Jeff Schneeweis acting as main producer, and the band co-producing. Schneeweis mixed the recordings, before the album was mastered by Kevin Bartley at Capitol Studios.

== Musical style and song selection ==
Fragile Future is seen as a departure from the band's original post-hardcore style, present on their first two albums. The album introduced a friendlier sound, much closer to pop rock. Due to the death of unclean vocalist Casey Calvert, there is a noticeable absence of harsh vocals on the record. The album is also the first release by the band to employ guitar solos, which were rarely heard on the band's previous releases, with the exception of "Breathing in Sequence" from If Only You Were Lonely.

JT Woodruff said, "It definitely sounds like Hawthorne Heights. We didn’t write 13 curveballs or whatever. There are a couple of things we’ve never done before, but it definitely sounds rock. There’s not a whole lot of polished pop sounds to it or whatever. The guitars are blazing. Everything’s loud. The drums pound pretty hard. As far as the actual songs, we wrote a whole lot of songs and then kind of whittled them down into a collection of songs that we thought sounded a little bit different from each other. We didn’t want to have the same types of songs."

Before release, the track listing for the record was altered. Out of 21 songs written for the album, merely 12 were actually used. In reference to tracks that were intended for the album, band member Eron Bucciarelli said in a 2007 interview:

"There's a song called "The End of the Underground" and "Sugar in the Engine" which I really, really like because they're kind of darker, a little more moody. They're kind of along the lines of our song "Niki FM" in a little way, but it's sort of "Niki FM" to the next level."

"Sugar in the Engine" became the fifth track on the album. The other song mentioned was not used for Fragile Future, but it later became the third track on the band's very next album, Skeletons. The song had its title simplified to "End of the Underground".

== Release ==
On June 6, 2008, Victory Records announced that they would be releasing the band's third album in August. On June 16, a clip of a new track, titled "Rescue Me", was posted on the band's Myspace account. Two days later, the band held a meet and greet event at Victory Records' offices. Here, fans were given the opportunity to hear the new album. The full version of "Rescue Me" was posted on the band's Myspace on June 26; it was later released to radio on July 7. In July and August, the band participated in the 2008 edition of the Projekt Revolution tour. On July 22, "Rescue Me" was released on iTunes. Two days later, the band performed an acoustic in-store session at Looney Tunes, a record store located in Long Island.

Fragile Future was released on August 5. That same day, the music video for "Rescue Me" was posted online. An acoustic EP, titled Rhapsody Originals, was released exclusively for Rhapsody on August 26. It features three live acoustic songs from Fragile Future, and one from their first studio album, The Silence in Black and White. In October and November, the band went on a headlining US tour, titled the Never Sleep Again Tour. They were supported by Emery, the Color Fred, the Mile After and Tickle Me Pink. The trek included an appearance at Edgefest in Texas. In March 2009, the band held an acoustic session for ShockHound.

== Reception ==
Professional ratings
Aggregate scores
Source	Rating
Metacritic	61/100
Review scores
Source	Rating
Allmusic	3/5 stars
Alternative Press	3.5/5
Sputnikmusic	1/5

The album debuted at #23 on the Billboard 200, and #4 on the top Independent album chart. The album spent 5 weeks on the Billboard 200 chart.

== Track listing ==
All songs written by Hawthorne Heights.

1. "The Business of Paper Stars" - 3:47
2. "Rescue Me" - 3:08
3. "Until the Judgment Day" - 3:45
4. "Somewhere in Between" - 3:22
5. "Sugar in the Engine" - 4:29
6. "Desperation" - 3:28
7. "Four Become One" - 3:55
8. "321" - 3:40
9. "Disaster" - 3:01
10. "Let Go of Everything You Know" - 3:25
11. "Corps of Corpses" - 3:12
12. "Come Back Home (Reprised)" - 4:11
- In "Come Back Home (Reprised)", the reprise part is the chorus from "This Is Who We Are", which is from the band's second album, If Only You Were Lonely.

=== iTunes bonus tracks ===
1. "321." (Remix) - 3:17
2. "Desperation" (Remix) - 3:37
3. "Come Back Home" (Demo) - 3:25
4. "Disaster" (Demo) - 3:01
5. "Four Become One" (Demo) - 2:35
6. "Somewhere in Between" (Demo) [Pre-order only]

=== Wal-Mart bonus tracks ===
1. "Scrantonicity (Summer Sunshine)" - 2:59
2. "Lost, So Lost" - 3:54
3. "Rescue Me" (Acoustic) - 3:34
4. "Somewhere in Between" (Acoustic) - 3:35
5. "Four Become One" (Acoustic) - 4:04
6. "Disaster" (Acoustic) - 3:10
- The Wal-Mart version of the record also comes with a bonus DVD.

== Personnel ==
Personnel per booklet.

Hawthorne Heights

- JT Woodruff – lead vocals, rhythm guitar
- Micah Carli – lead guitar, keyboards, drum programming, backing vocals
- Matt Ridenour – bass, backing vocals
- Eron Bucciarelli – drums, backing vocals

Additional musicians

- Jeff Schneeweis – additional keys, drum programming, additional vocals
- Rick Hanson – additional vocals

Production and design

- Jeff Schneeweis – producer, engineer, mixing
- Hawthorne Heights – co-producer
- Kevin Bartley – mastering
- Micah Carli – photography
- Kelle Carli – band photo
- Mike Ski – layout

== Charts ==
Chart performance
Chart (2008)	Peak position
Australian Hitseekers Albums (ARIA)	9
UK Independent Albums (Official Charts)	13
UK Rock & Metal Albums (Official Charts)	17
US Billboard 200	23
US Independent Albums (Billboard)	4
US Indie Store Album Sales (Billboard)	7
US Top Alternative Albums (Billboard)	6
US Top Rock Albums (Billboard)	7
