= Brendan Murphy =

Brendan Murphy may refer to:

== Sportspeople ==
- Brendan Murphy (Carlow footballer) (born 1989), and former international rules and Australian rules player
- Brendan Murphy (Meath footballer) (born 1975), also a former professional soccer player
- Brendan Murphy (Cork Gaelic footballer) (1921–2005), Irish Gaelic football player and administrator
- Brendan Murphy (hurler) (born 1980), Offaly hurler

== Other people ==
- Brendan Murphy (doctor) (born 1955), Secretary of the Australian Department of Health and former chief medical officer
- Brendan Murphy, lead vocalist of metal band Counterparts
