= Zero (Hawthorne Heights album) =

Studio album by Hawthorne Heights
- Released: June 25, 2013
- Recorded: 2013
- Genre: Alternative rock, emo, post-hardcore
- Length: 44:15
- Label: Red Entertainment
- Producer: Brian Virtue

Hawthorne Heights chronology
Hope (2012)	Zero (2013)	Hurt (2015)

Singles from Zero
- 1. "Golden Parachutes" Released: May 18, 2013; 2. "Taken by the Dark" Released: June 11, 2013

Professional ratings
Aggregate scores
Source	Rating
Metacritic	64/100
Review scores
Source	Rating

Zero is the fifth studio album by American rock band Hawthorne Heights, released on June 25, 2013. It's their first album to be released through Red Entertainment. The album was produced by Brian Virtue.

== Promotion and release ==
It was announced early 2013 that the band signed deal with Red Entertainment and that a new album is in the works. They put their final EP from their Hate/Hope Trilogy on hold, so they can work on a new album. They financed the entire project via pledgemusic. The album debuted at 118th place on the Billboard 200. It is also the band's last studio album to feature drummer Eron Bucciarelli and guitarist Micah Carli.

=== Songs and singles released ===
- On May 18, 2013, the first single "Golden Parachutes" was released. The song impacted radio on May 28, 2013.
- On June 11, 2013, they released their second song "Taken By The Dark" which contains a heavier side including screams from Micah.

== Album title ==
The band explained: "We went in with a bunch of songs and came out with a concept album, the likes of which we’ve never attempted to undertake in the past. If you’re a long-time fan of Hawthorne Heights, you know we’ve been through a lot over the years. No matter how hard life gets or how many seemingly insurmountable odds you may encounter, everyone can get a fresh start. “ZERO” deals with these life issues against a dystopian, war-ravaged backdrop".

== Track listing ==
All lyrics are written by JT Woodruff; all music is composed by Hawthorne Heights.

No.	Title	Length
1.	"Skeletons Remain (Transmission 1)"	1:21
2.	"Memories of Misery"	2:59
3.	"Darkside"	3:04
4.	"Spark"	3:39
5.	"Zero"	3:38
6.	"Anywhere but Here"	2:59
7.	"Hollow Hearts Unite"	3:38
8.	"Coalition of Alternate Living Methods (Broadcast)"	0:54
9.	"Golden Parachutes"	2:55
10.	"Put Me Back Together"	3:03
11.	"Strangers"	3:38
12.	"Ghost Town"	3:31
13.	"Lost in the Calm"	3:08
14.	"Taken by the Dark"	3:36
15.	"Over and Out (Transmission 2)"	2:14

== Personnel ==
Hawthorne Heights

- JT Woodruff – lead vocals, rhythm guitar
- Micah Carli – lead guitar, unclean vocals
- Mark McMillon – rhythm and lead guitars, backing vocals
- Matt Ridenour – bass, backing vocals
- Eron Bucciarelli – drums, percussion

Production

- Album produced by Brian Virtue
- Art Direction & Design by Jeff Chenault
