= Central West =

Central West or Central Western may refer to:

== Australia ==
- Central West (New South Wales), an official region of New South Wales, Australia
- Central Western Time, a time zone in Australia
- Central Western Daily, an Australian newspaper

== Brazil ==
- Central-West Region, Brazil, a region of states in Brazil that composes the three states of Goiás, Mato Grosso and Mato Grosso do Sul

== China ==
- Central and Western District, sometimes called "Central West District" (中西區) in Hong Kong, China

== Taiwan ==
- West Central District, sometimes called "Central West District" (中西區) in Tainan, Taiwan

== United Kingdom ==
- Central West, the western region of ITV Central's broadcasting area in England, United Kingdom, covering Birmingham and the wider West Midland region - see ITV Central

== United States ==
- Central West, Trenton, New Jersey, a neighborhood in Trenton, New Jersey, United States

== Venezuela ==
- Central-Western Region, Venezuela, a region of states in Venezuela that composes the three states of Falcón, Lara, Portuguesa, and Yaracuy

== See also ==
- Midwest (disambiguation)
