= Saying Sorry =

Single by Hawthorne Heights

from the album If Only You Were Lonely
- Released: May 22, 2006
- Recorded: 2005
- Genre: Emo; pop-punk; post-hardcore
- Length: 3:07
- Label: Victory
- Songwriters: JT Woodruff, Matt Ridenour, Micah Carli, Eron Bucciarelli, and Casey Calvert
- Producer: David Bendeth

Hawthorne Heights singles chronology
"Silver Bullet" (2005)	"Saying Sorry" (2006)	"This Is Who We Are" (2006)

"Saying Sorry" is a song by the American rock band Hawthorne Heights. It was released on May 22, 2006, as the lead single from their second album, If Only You Were Lonely. "Saying Sorry" was released to radio on January 31, 2006. The song peaked at number 7 on the Billboard Alternative Songs Chart.

== Track listing ==
Compact Disc (US)

1. "Saying Sorry"
2. "Saying Sorry (Acoustic)"
3. "Ohio Is for Lovers (Acoustic)"

7-inch blue vinyl (UK)

1. "Saying Sorry"
2. "Saying Sorry (Acoustic)"

7-inch pink vinyl (UK)

1. "Saying Sorry"
2. "Ohio Is for Lovers (Acoustic)"

== Personnel ==
- JT Woodruff - lead vocals
- Casey Calvert - guitars, unclean vocals
- Matt Ridenour - bass guitar, backing vocals
- Micah Carli - guitar
- Eron Bucciarelli - drums
