= Hope (Hawthorne Heights EP) =

EP by Hawthorne Heights
- Released: June 5, 2012
- Recorded: 2012
- Genre: Post-hardcore, emo, pop punk, alternative rock
- Length: 26:49
- Label: Cardboard Empire
- Producer: Hawthorne Heights

Hawthorne Heights chronology
| Hate (2011) | Hope (2012) | Zero (2013) |

Professional ratings
Review scores
| Source | Rating |
|---|---|
| Absolute Punk | 80% |
| Alternative Press | 3.5/5 stars |

Hope is the second EP of a trilogy released by American rock band Hawthorne Heights through the band's own record label, Cardboard Empire. Hope was released for digital download on June 5, 2012. It is also the second release by the band to contain a title track.

== Track list ==
| No. | Title | Length |
|---|---|---|
| 1. | "There Was a Kid (Part 2)" | 1:37 |
| 2. | "New Winter" | 4:13 |
| 3. | "Running in Place (Niki AM)" | 3:49 |
| 4. | "Stranded" | 4:01 |
| 5. | "Nowhere Fast" | 2:16 |
| 6. | "Hope" | 3:22 |
| 7. | "Vandemonium" | 3:42 |
| 8. | "Chemicals" | 3:49 |

== Personnel ==
Hawthorne Heights

- JT Woodruff – Lead vocals, piano, rhythm guitar
- Micah Carli – Lead guitar, screamed vocals
- Matt Ridenour – Bass, backing vocals
- Eron Bucciarelli – Drums, percussion

Additional musicians

- Mark McMillon – backing vocals, group vocals
- Chris "Poppy" Popadak" – group vocals
- Mitch Vice – group vocals
- Kevin Kirk – group vocals
