= Niki FM =

Single by Hawthorne Heights

from the album The Silence in Black and White
- Released: September 27, 2005
- Recorded: 2004
- Genre: Emo; post-hardcore; pop-punk
- Length: 4:01
- Label: Victory
- Songwriter: JT Woodruff

Hawthorne Heights singles chronology
"Ohio Is for Lovers" (2005)	"Niki FM" (2005)	"Silver Bullet" (2005)

"Niki FM" is a song by American rock band Hawthorne Heights. "Niki FM" was released to radio on September 27, 2005 as the second single from their debut studio album, The Silence in Black and White. It peaked at #40 on the Billboard Modern Rock Tracks chart.

A demo version of the track was included in the re-issued version of The Silence in Black and White. According to JT Woodruff, he wrote the song after reading critical reviews about the bands he liked, and fearing that Hawthorne Heights would suffer from the same fate, hence the line, "They're waiting for us to fall". It is also his most personal song, and his favorite track to play live.

== Composition and music ==
The song's bridge features a screaming section performed by late guitarist Casey Calvert. A staff writer at Worcester Magazine described the screams as "the gentle sound of the backup singer strangling, at length, twice. [...] Presumably he’s choking on a bitter lump of unrequited love."

== Music video ==
The song and music video contain several references to the 1989 movie Say Anything.... The music video begins with Woodruff singing the first verse during his graduation speech at "Hawthorne Heights University", whilst noticing his female interest rubbing the leg of a boy in the audience. After the graduates traditionally toss their hats into the air, the chorus plays and the scene changes to a graduation party, where the same female approaches Woodruff and kisses him. The band is also shown performing in front of a mansion.

The scene changes to Woodruff having dinner at the female's house with her and her father. The father becomes angry and throws tea in Woodruff's face before an argument occurs. The scene changes to the female's bedroom, where she's lying in bed and smoking. The video then shows Woodruff in his bedroom, tearing a picture of her in two. He falls asleep and dreams about her. The scene changes back to the female's bedroom, where she notices Woodruff standing outside of her window, holding a radio (hence the line, "I'm outside of your window, with my radio."). The female walks away, seemingly turning Woodruff down.

Kris Waldbillig, guitarist of Cincinnati punk rock band Mint 6 Ten, makes a cameo appearance in the video. Female played by Nikol Soluski.

== Personnel ==
- JT Woodruff – lead vocals
- Matt Ridenour – bass guitar, backing vocals
- Eron Bucciarelli – drums
- Casey Calvert – guitars, unclean vocals
- Micah Carli – guitars
