= Bad Frequencies =

Studio album by Hawthorne Heights
- Released: April 27, 2018
- Studio: Capital House Studio (Columbus, Ohio)
- Genre: Post-hardcore; emo; pop punk
- Length: 41:04
- Label: Pure Noise
- Producer: Hawthorne Heights, Nick Ingram

Hawthorne Heights chronology
Hurt (2015)	Bad Frequencies (2018)	Lost Frequencies (2019)

Singles from Bad Frequencies
- 1. "Push Me Away" Released: May 31, 2017; 2. "Pink Hearts" Released: March 1, 2018; 3. "Just Another Ghost" Released: March 21, 2018; 4. "Bad Frequencies" Released: July 11, 2018

Professional ratings
Review scores
Source	Rating
AllMusic	2.5/5 stars
Cryptic Rock	3.5/5
Substream	Positive

Bad Frequencies is the sixth studio album by American post-hardcore band Hawthorne Heights. The album was released on April 27, 2018 through Pure Noise Records.

== Background and production ==
Vocalist/guitarist JT Woodruff stated that the album was written over the course of a year in 2017 while the band was touring, saying "We played 170 shows in 2017, wrote every moment that we could, then demoed, then recorded an album. I think we fit everything we possibly could in 365 days, and we are very proud of that."

On May 31, 2017, the band released a 30-second music video teaser for the song "Push Me Away" via their Facebook page. A digital single for the song was released the same day. The full music video for "Push Me Away" debuted on June 5 via Dying Scene. The band stated that the song would appear on a new studio album, which at the time was untitled. Bad Frequencies was recorded at Capitol House Studios, and produced by the band and Mark Ingram, who also acted as engineer. Cameron Webb mixed the recordings, before they were mastered by Andrew Alekel.

== Release ==
The second advance single from the album, "Pink Hearts," was released on March 1, 2018. With the single's release, it was announced that the new album would be titled Bad Frequencies with a release date of April 27, 2018. A music video for the song "Just Another Ghost," directed by Benny Gagliardi, was released on March 21. The title track was released as a single on July 11 with a music video for the song being released on September 4. Music videos for "Starlighter (Echo, Utah)" and "Pills" were released on May 14 and September 9, 2019, respectively.

== Track listing ==
All tracks written by Hawthorne Heights.

No.	Title	Length
1.	"In Gloom"	2:35
2.	"Pink Hearts"	3:12
3.	"Crimson Sand"	2:53
4.	"The Perfect Way to Fall Apart"	4:08
5.	"Just Another Ghost"	3:05
6.	"Bad Frequencies"	2:49
7.	"Skylark"	3:14
8.	"Edge of Town"	3:00
9.	"Starlighter (Echo, Utah)"	3:17
10.	"Push Me Away"	2:53
11.	"The Suicide Mile"	3:39
12.	"Straight Down the Line"	2:51
13.	"Pills"	3:28
Total length:		41:04

== Personnel ==
Personnel per booklet.

Hawthorne Heights

- JT Woodruff – lead vocals, rhythm guitar
- Mark McMillon – lead guitar, unclean vocals
- Matt Ridenour – bass, backing vocals
- Chris Popadak – drums

Additional musicians

- Will Deely – additional vocals
- Sienna Skies – additional vocals

Production and design

- Hawthorne Heights – producer, art direction
- Mark Ingram – producer, engineer
- Cameron Webb – mixing
- Andrew Alekel – mastering
- Kevin Moore – art direction, layout, design
- Adam Fields – album photography
- John Fleischman – band photography

== Charts ==
Chart (2018)	Peak position
US Independent Albums (Billboard)	10
