= Hate (EP) =

EP by Hawthorne Heights
- Released: August 23, 2011
- Recorded: 2011
- Genre: Post-hardcore, emo, screamo
- Length: 27:14
- Label: Cardboard Empire

Hawthorne Heights chronology
Midwesterners: The Hits (2010)	Hate (2011)	Hope (2012)

Professional ratings
Review scores
Source	Rating
AbsolutePunk	8/10
Alternative Press	3/5 stars
Rockfreaks.net	8.5/10 stars

Hate is the first EP of a trilogy released by American rock band Hawthorne Heights through the band's own record label, Cardboard Empire. Hate was released for digital download on August 23, 2011. It is also the first release by the band to contain a title track.

== Promotion and release ==
On August 11, 2011, the album art and track listing for Hate was revealed. The next day MTV premiered one of the EP's tracks, "Four White Walls". Digital pre-order for the EP became available shortly after, and on August 21, 2011, the entire EP was leaked onto the internet. Though the album is considered an EP, it is intended as a full album by the members of the band.

Two music videos have been released, the first for the song "Is This What You Wanted?" and the second for "Four White Walls".

== Musical style ==
Hate lyrically deals with feelings of hate, anger, and solitude. According to Woodruff, Hate features more "aggressive songs" that are "a lot heavier than anything we’ve ever done." The EP has been compared to other screamo records, such as records by Senses Fail. Screamed vocals and breakdowns are prominent features throughout the album, reflecting the musical style of the band's first two albums. One review states "this aggressive side, dormant for the past few years, has finally boiled over all at once."

== Track listing ==
1. "There Was A Kid (Part 1)" – 1:17
2. "Is This What You Wanted?" – 2:32
3. "Divided" – 3:37
4. "Hate" – 2:48
5. "Wasted In NYC" – 2:19
6. "Stay Awake/Stay Alive" – 2:55
7. "Oceans" – 4:26
8. "Four White Walls" – 2:59
9. "Passengers" – 4:19

== Personnel ==
- JT Woodruff – lead vocals, piano, rhythm guitar
- Micah Carli – lead guitar, unclean vocals
- Matt Ridenour – bass, backing vocals
- Eron Bucciarelli – drums, percussion
