= The Silence in Black and White =

Studio album by Hawthorne Heights
- Released: June 8, 2004
- Studios: Smart Studios, Madison, Wisconsin; Big Gold, Chicago, Illinois
- Genres: Emo; screamo; post-hardcore; emo pop
- Length: 43:01
- Label: Victory
- Producer: Sean O'Keefe

Hawthorne Heights chronology
Paper Chromatography: The Fade From Dark To Light (2003)	The Silence in Black and White (2004)	If Only You Were Lonely (2006)

Singles from The Silence in Black and White
- 1. "Ohio Is for Lovers" Released: June 14, 2005; 2. "Niki FM" Released: September 27, 2005; 3. "Silver Bullet" Released: 2005

The Silence in Black and White is the debut album by the American rock band Hawthorne Heights, and their first release after changing their name from A Day in the Life.

== Background and recording ==
Writing for the album commenced shortly after the band changed their name from A Day In the Life to Hawthorne Heights. The band had sent around 35 separate press kits to several potential record labels, receiving interest from a few of them, including Victory Records. Victory had sent the band two generic response letters a month apart; drummer Eron Bucciarelli subsequently emailed the label and told them what the band had been doing since the letters' arrival. Founder Tony Brummel contacted them the following day, asking when he could see them in person. Six days after this, they played a showcase for the label, who gave them an offer shortly afterwards. A month after this, all of the members quit their day jobs to focus on the band full-time. They recorded their debut album at Smart Studios in Madison, Wisconsin and at Big Gold Studios in Chicago, Illinois. The sessions were done over 15-hour days across a five-week period. The recordings were mixed at Gravity Studios before the album was mastered by Dominick Maita at Airshow Mastering with Pro Tools engineer Dan Duszynski.

== Music and lyrics ==
Musically, the sound on The Silence in Black and White has been described as "poppy, mid-tempo post-hardcore." In addition to post-hardcore, the album's styles have also been categorized as emo, emo pop, pop, screamo pop, and screamo. Alternative Press categorized the album's sound as representing scene music, and stated the opinion that it draws influence from gothic rock in addition to emo and its offshoots. Additionally, the vocal performances of JT Woodruff and Casey Calvert incorporate elements of alternative rock and metalcore. The album's guitar work features frequent use of power chords and start-stop rhythm guitar, drawing comparisons to the work of Jimmy Eat World, Thursday, Good Charlotte and Silverstein. The album also makes occasional use of piano and keyboards. The Boston Phoenix writer Mikael Woodliked the track "Silver Bullet" to 1980s hair metal with its "dueling guitar mini-solos, nonsense about getting shot through the heart, and plenty of cowbell". Grace Carli's guest vocals are described as having a "breathy tenor" tone.

The album's lyrics have been described as "melodramatic" and "heartfelt". Woodruff said the title of "Life on Standby" referred to being in a touring band, having to "put your entire life on standby to try your hardest". He added that it acted as a valuable introduction to the band as a whole as it has "parts that are both dark and light". Woodruff wrote "Dissolve and Decay" for a friend of his that was having relationship issues, specifically being unfaithful to another friend of his. "Niki FM" was written after Woodruff read various album reviews in preparation for the response to the band's album. He noticed a theme where "every band I liked was getting torn apart" critically. It included a reference to Say Anything... (1989), which was Woodruff's all-time favorite film. "The Transition" was the first song they wrote after changing their name; the title alludes to this change. Part of its lyrics were influenced by Woodruff's girlfriend who had been studying in Europe for three months. The lyrics to "Blue Burns Orange" were re-written in the studio; Woodruff remarked that during the making of the album, none of the band members were sleeping or eating properly "so my dreams were really crazy. I just remember dreaming in black and white a bunch and really noticing it".

"Silver Bullet" is titled after the 1986 movie of the same name, which was Woodruff's favorite horror film. He had written the lyrics while doing two jobs and attending college concurrently, and "felt like [the band] was going nowhere but a lot of things convinced me to stay with it". Discussing "Screenwriting an Apology", Woodruff explained that movies can sometimes convey messages better than words. Some of its lyrics deal with Woodruff being irrational, while others are about his girlfriend being irrational. "Ohio Is for Lovers" talks about the band members' girlfriends, all of which lived in Ohio, who Woodruff wanted to pay homage to. "Wake Up Call" talks about Woodruff being insecure as a musician, knowing that his lyricism was going to be scrutinized. Discussing "Sandpaper and Silk", Woodruff said a person once "described our music as a great blend of sandpaper and silk. I thought that was kind of neat". It dealt with the music scene in Dayton, Ohio, and people that started hating the band as soon as they signed to Victory Records. "Speeding Up the Octaves" is about an on-and-off friendship that Woodruff had where his friend would become addicted to a substance, get clean and be addicted again.

== Release and promotion ==
In May and June 2004, the band went on tour with Alexisonfire, Silverstein and Emery. It was released on June 8, 2004 through Victory Records. The album was the label's highest selling debut at the time of its release. Two music videos were produced, one for "Ohio is For Lovers" in 2004, and one for "Niki FM" in 2005. They went on an East Coast US tour with Bayside, Burning Bright and the Break in September 2004. In November and December 2004, the band supported A Static Lullaby on their headlining US tour.

Hawthorne Heights embarked on their first headlining US tour in January 2005 with Number One Fan and labelmates Spitalfield and the Black Maria. In February and March 2005, the group supported Sugarcult on the US Take Action Tour. In May 2005, they shot a music video for "Niki FM" with director Major Lightner. A two-disc CD and DVD special edition was released on June 14, 2005, containing demo and acoustic versions of the tracks, live performances, and a documentary with footage of the band. "Niki FM" was released to radio on September 27, 2005.

== Artwork ==
The album's cover artwork has been described as having "a classic Game Boy-esque puke green" tint.

== Reception and legacy ==
Professional ratings
Review scores
Source	Rating
AllMusic	2.5/5 stars
The Boston Phoenix	2/5 stars

It’s like getting back behind the wheel of your your first car when you turn 16-years-old. I think it’s really easy to be self critical when you’re in a band, especially when it’s your first record. So a year later, you’re thinking, man, we could have done so much better, because you’re a better musician at that point. And now, you think the reverse of it, because your fans have consistently told you for 20 years that this is an album that they love. Maybe some of the magic of it is that you had no idea what the hell you were doing and then you were just kind of playing stuff that you loved. You weren’t trying to have any success with it. You weren’t trying to write a hit song. You were just trying to write out your emotions. I think it’s cool because we need to look back honorably on it instead of wondering what would have happened, should we change something or if we had more time creating it.

— JT Woodruff of Hawthorne Heights, as quoted by Rozanna M. Martinez, journal arts editor at Albuquerque Journal

The Silence in Black and White received negative reviews from critics, several who thought the band's sound was formulaic. Wood thought that "even if Silence offers fewer surprises than an entire season of Joey, Hawthorne Heights use their well-worn tools to build the occasional hard-hitting rock machine". Rob O'Connor of Yahoo! Music wrote that the band were not "afraid of adding a little riffage to their attack arsenal", going on to praise Calvert and Ridenour's roles in the band.

AllMusic reviewer Stewart Mason gave the album a lukewarm review with two and a half stars, noting that although he thought most of the songs had "reasonably catchy choruses," the album suffered from an "overall lack of personality." He concluded his review saying: "There's nothing on The Silence in Black and White that'll make anyone turn it off and throw the CD across the room in a fit of rage, but it's hard to remember anything about the album an hour after it's over."

The album peaked at No. 56 on the Billboard top 200 chart, No. 1 on the Billboard Heatseekers Albums Chart, and No. 4 on the top independent album chart. The album has been certified gold status by the Recording Industry Association of America. Before the release of their second album If Only You Were Lonely in February 2006, The Silence in Black and White had sold over 720,000 copies.

The band released a special acoustic 10th Anniversary release of the album, with all tracks being redone acoustically. Journalists Leslie Simon and Trevor Kelley included the album in their list of the most essential emo releases in their book Everybody Hurts: An Essential Guide to Emo Culture (2007). Alternative Press ranked "Ohio Is for Lovers" at number 88 on their list of the best 100 singles from the 2000s.

Em Casalena of American Songwriter called the album "essential listening" for 2000s emo. In 2020, Alternative Press stated that the album "is integral to the history of scene music."

== Track listing ==
All tracks are written by Hawthorne Heights

No.	Title	Length
1.	"Life on Standby"	4:11
2.	"Dissolve and Decay"	3:44
3.	"Niki FM"	4:00
4.	"The Transition"	4:05
5.	"Blue Burns Orange"	3:20
6.	"Silver Bullet"	4:03
7.	"Screenwriting an Apology"	3:43
8.	"Ohio Is for Lovers"	4:05
9.	"Wake Up Call"	4:02
10.	"Sandpaper and Silk"	3:37
11.	"Speeding Up the Octaves"	4:11
Total length:		43:01

All tracks are written by Hawthorne Heights

Deluxe edition bonus tracks
No.	Title	Length
1.	"Silver Bullet" (Demo)	3:38
2.	"Niki FM" (Demo)	3:53
3.	"Speeding Up the Octaves" (Demo)	3:56
4.	"Ohio is fot Lovers" (Live Acoustic on Q101)	4:22
5.	"The Transition" (Live/Acoustic on Q101)	3:55
6.	"Silver Bullet" (Acoustic)	4:59
7.	"Aparrently Hoverboards Don't Work on Water"	2:54

== Personnel ==
Personnel per booklet.

Hawthorne Heights

- JT Woodruff – lead vocals, guitar
- Micah Carli – guitar
- Casey Calvert – guitar, screamed vocals
- Matt Ridenour – bass guitar, backing vocals
- Eron Bucciarelli – drums

Additional musicians

- Grace Carli – additional vocals (tracks 4, 5 and 9)

Production and design

- Dominick Maita – mastering
- Dan Dusyznski – Pro Tools engineer
- Jonathan Willoughby – band photo
- Jason Link – layout

== Charts ==
=== Weekly charts ===
Weekly chart performance for The Silence in Black and White
Chart (2005–2006)	Peak position
UK Independent Albums (Official Charts)	43
UK Rock & Metal Albums (Official Charts)	36
US Billboard 200	56
US Heatseekers Albums (Billboard)	1
US Independent Albums (Billboard)	3
US Top Rock Albums (Billboard)	23

=== Year-end charts ===
Year-end chart performance for The Silence in Black and White
Chart (2005)	Position
US Billboard 200	141

== Certifications ==
Certifications for The Silence in Black and White
Region	Certification	Certified units/sales
United States (RIAA)	Gold	722,000
