= Ohio Is for Lovers =

Single by Hawthorne Heights

from the album The Silence in Black and White
- Released: June 14, 2005
- Recorded: 2004
- Genre: Emo; post-hardcore
- Length: 4:04
- Label: Victory
- Songwriters: JT Woodruff; Matt Ridenour; Micah Carli; Eron Bucciarelli; Casey Calvert
- Producer: Sean O'Keefe

Hawthorne Heights singles chronology
"Ohio Is for Lovers" (2005)	"Niki FM" (2005)

Music video
- "Ohio Is for Lovers" on YouTube

"Ohio Is for Lovers", also known as simply "Ohio", is a song by American rock band Hawthorne Heights, released as the debut single from their debut studio album, The Silence in Black and White, which was released in 2004.

The song's lyrics deal with long-distance relationships, homesickness, self-harm and everyday sadism.

== Composition and lyrics ==
According to lead singer JT Woodruff, the song is about going on tour whilst leaving their girlfriends in Ohio.

Described as a "screamo song about being homesick and also cutting your wrists," the song is frequently considered the band's signature song, and has been jokingly referred to as "The Emo Anthem" due to the self-harm topics in its lyrical content.

== Background and release ==
It peaked at #34 on the US Billboard Alternative Songs Chart. When the music video for the song began to receive airplay on MTV, it boosted the band's popularity, resulting in The Silence in Black and White being certified gold in the United States by the RIAA.

An acoustic version of the track was recorded on the album's re-issue.

The track was also included with some downloads of the Winamp Media Player.

== Music video ==
The music video was directed by Shane Drake. The video features footage of the band performing in an old building while a little girl is shown aging rapidly and a spider is spinning its web. According to JT Woodruff, the band members were wearing each other's clothing and the microphone was hanging from the ceiling because they forgot to bring the stand.

== Reception ==
In 2006, Scott Shetler of Slant Magazine said the song was "every bit as absurd as it was catchy."

== Track listing ==
No.	Title	Length
1.	"Ohio Is for Lovers" (Album Version)	4:04
2.	"Ohio Is for Lovers" (Instrumental Version)	4:04

== Personnel ==
- JT Woodruff - lead vocals, rhythm guitar
- Matt Ridenour - bass, backing vocals
- Micah Carli - lead guitar
- Eron Bucciarelli - drums
- Casey Calvert - rhythm guitar, unclean vocals

== Chart performance ==
Chart (2005)	Peak position
US Alternative Airplay (Billboard)	34

== Certifications ==
Region	Certification	Certified units/sales
United States (RIAA)	Gold	500,000^{*}
^{*} Sales figures based on certification alone.
