= If Only You Were Lonely =

Studio album by Hawthorne Heights
- Released: February 28, 2006
- Recorded: September – October 2005
- Studios: Water Music, Hoboken, New Jersey
- Genres: Emo pop-punk; post-hardcore
- Length: 43:40
- Label: Victory
- Producer: David Bendeth

Hawthorne Heights chronology
The Silence in Black and White (2004)	If Only You Were Lonely (2006)	Fragile Future (2008)

Singles from If Only You Were Lonely
- 1. "This Is Who We Are" Released: January 10, 2006; 2. "Saying Sorry" Released: January 31, 2006; 3. "Pens and Needles" Released: June 13, 2006; 4. "I Am on Your Side" Released: October 10, 2006

If Only You Were Lonely is the second studio album by American rock band Hawthorne Heights, and the final album to feature rhythm guitarist and unclean backing vocalist Casey Calvert before his death on November 24, 2007. It was produced by David Bendeth. The title of the album is in reference to a B-side by the Replacements of the same name.

The name for the track "Where Can I Stab Myself in the Ears?" is derived from a post on a forum that was an announcement for Hawthorne Heights' release on the popular music news website AbsolutePunk.

== Background and production ==
If Only You Were Lonely was recorded in September and October 2005 at Water Music in Hoboken, New Jersey, with producer David Bendeth. Dan Korneff and John Bender served as engineers, and both did digital editing, alongside Kato Khandwala. Ted Young aided them as assistant engineer. Korneff provided additional guitar production, and set up mixing, which was done by Bendeth and assistant Isaiah Abolin at Sound on Sound Studios and Right Track Studios, both in New York City in October 2005. Ted Jensen mastered the recordings at Sterling Sound.

== Music and lyrics ==
Musically, If Only You Were Lonely features a sound similar to that on The Silence in Black and White, the band's previous album. Michael Endelman of Entertainment Weekly said the band "slickly synthesizes a bunch of post-’90s micro-genres" on the album. Scott Shetler of Slant Magazine explained: "The band again relies on slightly tempered verses, explosive choruses, and heavy guitars, rarely deviating from the formula." The album features more triple-guitar harmonies than its predecessor, drawing comparisons to English heavy metal band Iron Maiden, and some tracks, such as the album's opener "This Is Who We Are," contain elements of punk rock. Despite drawing influence from heavy metal and punk rock, the album features fewer "blood-curdling screams" employed by guitarist Casey Calvert than its predecessor, which are "relegated mainly to solos near the end of songs."

Thematically, the album has been characterized by "overdramatic lyrics equating breaking up with the end of the world, and plenty of emo imagery." If Only You Were Lonely is a concept album about a long-distance relationship, and themes explored on the album include scarring, dissection, heartbreak and self-doubt. According to Q Magazine: "They spend half their time griping that they haven't got girlfriends and the other half whining that they've just been dumped." JT Woodruff's vocals have been referred to as "hypersensitive crooning." His vocals on the album's closing track, "Decembers", have drawn comparisons to Death Cab for Cutie frontman Ben Gibbard, as well as the Beach Boys. The lyrics to "Pens and Needles" have been called "an entire genre summed up in an opening verse."

== Release and promotion ==
In October 2005, Hawthorne Heights toured the UK with labelmates Bayside, Silverstein and Spitalfield; it led into a two-month tour of the US with those same acts, plus Aiden, dubbed the Never Sleep Again Tour. On November 23, 2005, If Only You Were Lonely was announced for release in three months' time; the album's track listing was posted online ten days later. "Saying Sorry" was made available for streaming solely on Christmas Day and Christmas Eve 2005 through their Myspace profile. This Is Who We Are, the band's first video album, was released on January 10, 2006; it included footage from the Never Sleep Again Tour, which saw the debut of three new songs, namely "Light Sleeper", "Where Can I Stab Myself in the Ears", and "This Is Who We Are".

In January 2006, Hawthorne Heights embarked on a UK tour with Still Remains, Aiden, and Bullet for My Valentine. A music video was released for "Saying Sorry" via AOL Music on January 16, 2006; it was released to radio on January 31, 2006. In February and March 2006, the group went on a tour of the US alongside Emery, Anberlin, June and Bleed the Dream. During this stint, If Only You Were Lonely was made available for streaming through AOL on February 6, 2006, before being released on February 28, 2006. From March to May 2006, the group toured with Fall Out Boy on their North American arena tour, titled the Black Clouds and Underdogs Tour. On May 25, 2006, the music video for "This Is Who We Are" was posted online. They appeared at The Bamboozle festival; following this, "Pens and Needles" was released to radio on June 13, 2006. In July, the band went on a tour of Canada alongside Story of the Year and Anberlin.

Throughout July and August 2006, the band performed a number of free intimate shows; fans could gain entry by signing up with Rockcorps. On August 7, it was announced that the band had left Victory Records, citing a lack of royalty payment. The following month, they appeared at the Bumbershoot festival. From September to November, the band headlined the 2006 edition of the Nintendo Fusion Tour. "I Am on Your Side" impacted radio on October 10. In June and July 2007, the bands went on a U.S. tour with support from From First to Last, Secondhand Serenade, Brighten and Powerspace. Following this, the group appeared on the 2007 edition of Warped Tour. In November and December, the band went on a headlining US tour dubbed Wintour. They were supported by Escape the Fate, Amber Pacific, the A.K.A.s and the Secret Handshake.

Music videos were made for three tracks from the album. The video for "This Is Who We Are" was filmed at the Minneapolis stop of the Black Clouds Tour on April 14, 2006. The band later filmed a music video for "Pens and Needles" in Miami. The video was directed by Dale "Rage" Resteghini. Another music video was filmed for "Saying Sorry".

On March 4, 2021, the band announced If Only You Were Lonely XV, a re-recording and re-imagining of If Only You Were Lonely in honor of its 15-year anniversary. The album was released in April of that year.

The band also announced The Lonely World Tour, where they will play the album in full for its 20-year anniversary, supported by letlive. and Creeper.

== Commercial performance ==
Professional ratings
Aggregate scores
Source	Rating
Metacritic	57/100
Review scores
Source	Rating
The A.V. Club	C−
AllMusic	link
Alternative Press	3.5/5 stars
Entertainment Weekly	B+
Popmatters	6/10 stars
Punknews.org	1.5/5 stars
Q	2/5 stars
Rolling Stone	3/5 stars
Slant Magazine	2.5/5 stars
Spin	C

If Only You Were Lonely debuted at No. 3 on the Billboard 200 and #1 on the Top Independent Albums chart, spending a total of 17 weeks on the former. It is the band's highest-charting album to date. The album was certified Gold by the RIAA on March 24, 2016.

== Critical reception ==
The album received mixed reviews. John D. Luerssen of AllMusic wrote: "The outfit's three-axe attack coupled with the distinctive pipes of J.T. Woodruff find Hawthorne Heights able to go where peers like Fall Out Boy just can't. Be it the downright winsome lilt of 'Saying Sorry' or the riotous punk of 'This Is Who We Are' -- painted with blood-curdling screams -- the group manages to walk the fine line between art and its aspirations of world domination with its credibility in check." The New York Times wrote: "Too many of the songs feel flat, despite the stormy guitars and stormier lyrics." Blender wrote: "Woodruff is never anything but coweringly passive, a trait about as appealing as it is annoying." Pop Matters wrote: "Hawthorne Heights don’t quite have the nervy energy or wit of a My Chemical Romance or Fall Out Boy yet, but their second album is a solid pop effort that reveals space for more growth."

Some critics questioned what they perceived to be the band's apparent attempt to attract fans from different audiences, and some stated their belief that the album would only appeal to listeners in a niche demographic. Scott Shetler of Slant Magazine wrote, "Hawthorne Heights deserve credit for connecting with their target audience, angsty teens for whom every minor event in life is a crisis. For that crowd, this is a good record. For everybody else, it’s essentially irrelevant." Michael Endelman of Entertainment Weekly wrote, "Please everybody and you often end up wowing nobody. For a band that’s done so well, their latest is surprisingly banal, bland, and — most importantly — hook deficient. [...] They’re the Collective Soul of emo: a competent band that’ll sell truckloads, but will we remember them in a decade?" Billboard wrote: "If Hawthorne Heights stopped trying to please several different audiences and decided whether it wanted to be a pop band or a post-hardcore group, it could make a more definitive musical statement."

Some reviewers criticized what they perceived to be the band's lack of originality. Brian Shultz of Punknews.org lambasted the album harshly, writing: "Hawthorne Heights is no longer the bottom of the barrel laughingstock they once were, but they haven't yet proved to be anything more than pandering, fourth-rate arena screamo supposedly representing 'underground' music. Song titles like 'We Are So Last Year' and 'Where Can I Stab Myself in the Ears' prove the band is well aware they are capable of nothing more than writing flat-sounding but catchy enough radio emo pop songs, and that they are simply a lasting fad who will (hopefully) fail to reach a considerable level of influence on the scene they believe to be dominating." Alternative Press wrote: "Lonely will buy Hawthorne Heights a few more minutes beyond the 15 they've already received. Here's to hoping they'll use that time to think outside of the box a little more when they write LP3."

== Track listing ==
All arrangements by Hawthorne Heights and David Bendeth.

No.	Title	Length
1.	"This Is Who We Are"	3:46
2.	"We Are So Last Year"	2:58
3.	"Language Lessons (Five Words or Less)"	3:21
4.	"Pens and Needles"	3:15
5.	"Saying Sorry"	3:08
6.	"Dead in the Water"	3:52
7.	"I Am on Your Side"	4:15
8.	"Breathing in Sequence"	3:29
9.	"Light Sleeper"	3:27
10.	"Cross Me Off Your List"	3:41
11.	"Where Can I Stab Myself in the Ears"	3:42
12.	"Decembers"	4:46
Total length:		43:40

Rhapsody Exclusive track
No.	Title	Length
13.	"Niki FM" (Live Version)

== Personnel ==
Personnel per booklet.

Hawthorne Heights

- JT Woodruff – lead vocals, guitar
- Micah Carli – lead guitar
- Casey Calvert – rhythm guitar, screamed vocals
- Matt Ridenour – bass guitar, backing vocals
- Eron Bucciarelli – drums

Additional musicians

- John Bender – additional backing vocals
- The Hawthorne Gang – additional vocals (tracks 8 and 11)
- Sebastian Davin – piano (track 12)

Design

- Paul Friemel – art direction, layout, original layout concept
- Dave Hill – photos
- Neil Visel – photo assistant
- Selena Salfen – band photography
- DoubleJ – original layout concept

Production

- David Bendeth – producer, mixing
- Dan Korneff – engineer, digital editing, additional guitar production, mix setup
- John Bender – digital editing, engineer
- Ted Young – assistant engineer
- Isaiah Abolin – mixing assistant
- Kato Khandwala – digital editing
- Ted Jensen – mastering

== Charts ==
=== Weekly charts ===
Weekly chart performance for If Only You Were Lonely
Chart (2006)	Peak position
Australian Hitseekers Albums (ARIA)	8
UK Albums (Official Charts)	85
UK Independent Albums (Official Charts)	5
UK Rock & Metal Albums (Official Charts)	2
US Billboard 200	3
US Independent Albums (Billboard)	1
US Indie Store Album Sales (Billboard)	3
US Top Rock Albums (Billboard)	1

=== Year-end charts ===
Year-end chart performance for If Only You Were Lonely
Chart (2006)	Position
US Billboard 200	165

== Certifications ==
Certifications for If Only You Were Lonely
Region	Certification	Certified units/sales
United States (RIAA)	Gold	500,000^{‡}
^{‡} Sales+streaming figures based on certification alone.
