= Hawthorne Heights =

American rock band

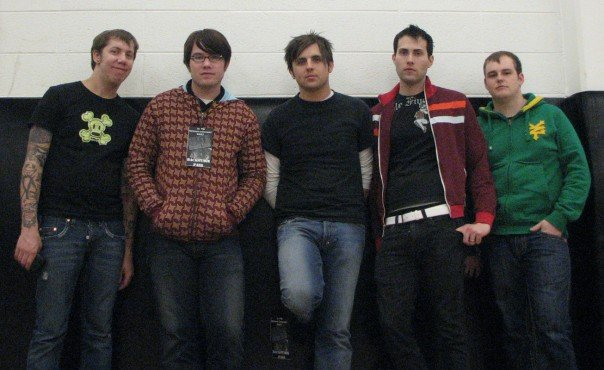
- Hawthorne Heights at the University of Scranton in Scranton, Pennsylvania, in April 2007; from left to right: Casey Calvert, JT Woodruff, Micah Carli, Eron Bucciarelli, and Matt Ridenour

Background information
- Also known as: A Day in the Life (2001–2003)
- Origin: Dayton, Ohio, U.S.
- Genres: Emo; post-hardcore; screamo; alternative rock
- Years active: 2001–present
- Labels: Victory; Wind-up; Cardboard Empire; Red River Entertainment; InVogue; Pure Noise; Thriller
- Members: JT Woodruff; Matt Ridenour; Mark McMillon
- Past members: Chris Popadak; Micah Carli; Eron Bucciarelli; Casey Calvert; Josh Bethel; Andy Saunders; Andy Lazier; Jesse Blair
- Website: hawthorneheights.com

Hawthorne Heights is an American rock band formed in Dayton, Ohio, in 2001. Originally called A Day in the Life, their lineup consists of JT Woodruff (lead vocals, rhythm guitar), Matt Ridenour (bass, backing vocals) and Mark McMillon (lead guitar, unclean vocals).

The band had commercial success with their first two albums, The Silence in Black and White (2004), and If Only You Were Lonely (2006), both achieving RIAA gold certification. Their second album peaked at No. 1 on Billboard's Independent Albums chart and No. 3 on the Billboard 200 chart. They are also well known for their 2006 single, "Saying Sorry", which reached gold status and reached No. 7 on the Billboard Hot Modern Rock Tracks chart. On November 24, 2007, rhythm guitarist and unclean vocalist Casey Calvert (son of Greg Calvert of Gary and the Hornets) died, leaving the band a four-piece. Their third album and first without Calvert, Fragile Future, was released in August 2008, surprisingly through Victory Records again, after a lengthy legal battle between the two parties.

The band's fourth album, Skeletons (2010), was No. 50 on the Billboard 200. The band's former label, Victory, released their first greatest hits album, entitled Midwesterners: The Hits, in November 2010. Shortly afterward, Hawthorne Heights left Wind-up Records to begin their own record label, Cardboard Empire. Via their label, the band released an EP trilogy, beginning with Hate, released in August 2011, followed by Hope in June 2012. After signing with Red River Entertainment in 2013, the band postponed the release of the third EP in the trilogy and released a full-length concept album titled Zero, in June 2013. Hawthorne Heights played on the 2013 Vans Warped Tour.

In June 2014, original drummer Eron Bucciarelli left the band. In January 2015, it was announced that original lead guitarist Micah Carli had also quit. Later in 2014, the band released Hurt, the third EP of the trilogy. The band's sixth studio album, Bad Frequencies, followed in 2018 and then their seventh album, The Rain Just Follows Me, in September 2021 via Pure Noise Records.

== History ==
=== Early days (2001–2003) ===
A Day in the Life were formed by JT Woodruff, Jesse Blair, Andy Saunders, Josh Bethel, and Andy Lazier in Dayton, Ohio in 2001. They took their name from "A Day in the Life", a song by the Beatles. Their first record was a demo titled Four Bullets for One Girl, which sold its 500 copy run in two months. That brought them to the attention of Confined Records, with which they released an album, Nine Reasons to Say Goodbye. Finally, they released a 6-song EP titled Paper Chromatography: The Fade from Dark to Light (which was partially re-released as part of the compilation From Ohio With Love) in the winter of 2003.

After some mild success the entire band quit except for JT, who decided to continue the band with new members and changed the band name. In 2003, Matt Ridenour, bassist and backing vocalist, passed a hotel called Hawthorn Inn & Suites on his way to work. He decided to add an "e" and Heights to make Hawthorne Heights. The rest of the band agreed.

=== The Silence in Black and White and If Only You Were Lonely (2004–2006) ===
Their first album, The Silence in Black and White, was recorded over a four-week period and released in 2004. The album was slow to build sales at first; however, soon the video for the song "Ohio Is for Lovers" began getting airplay on MTV, and the band enjoyed breakout success at radio as well as a growing nationwide fan base. The album became Victory Records' highest selling debut. The Silence in Black and White peaked at No. 56 on Billboard. The singles "Niki FM" and "Silver Bullet" were released in 2005.

When their second album, If Only You Were Lonely, was released on February 28, 2006, it debuted at No. 3 on Billboard, powered by the lead single "Saying Sorry" which received regular airplay on MTV, VH1, and Fuse. The Legion of Doom remixed a song from the album, entitled "Where Can I Stab Myself in the Ears?" and it appeared on the Underworld: Evolution Original Motion Picture Soundtrack. The remix was re-titled "Where Do I Stab Myself in the Ears". The band performed on the 2006 Nintendo Fusion Tour. A live CD/DVD was intended to be recorded from the tour, but was canceled, likely due to complications with Victory.

=== Death of Casey Calvert (2007) ===
Casey Calvert, the band's rhythm guitarist, was found dead on the band's tour bus at age 26 on November 24, 2007. The band had begun its American tour just the day before in Detroit. Toxicology and autopsy reports said that Calvert died of combined drug intoxication. A statement released by the members of the band said that Calvert died in his sleep and that his body was discovered before the band was scheduled to carry out a sound check before its show at the 9:30 Club, in Washington, D.C. The band spent a few days mourning, reflecting, and writing a song about their loss.

The song, titled "Four Become One" is on their third album, Fragile Future. They also dedicated another song to Calvert, "Sugar in the Engine". Near the end of the song, JT Woodruff is heard speaking of Calvert. According to the results of an autopsy performed by the office of the chief medical examiner in Washington D.C. and released in December 2007, Calvert's death was accidental. Dr. John Mendelson, a pharmacologist at the California Pacific Medical Center Research Institute in San Francisco, told MTV News, "Cases like Calvert's are so rare that they're almost nonexistent. It's so rare that you can't even put a number on it... It's exceedingly rare that 26-year-olds die of anything medical. This kind of death is one in several million." Both citalopram (also known by the brand name Celexa) and clonazepam (known by the brand names Klonopin and Rivotril) are prescription drugs, the former an antidepressant and the latter used to treat seizure disorders and panic attacks.

Drummer Eron Bucciarelli issued a statement:

From the time of the incident we suspected a possible drug interaction as the cause. Casey wrestled with depression for as long as we knew him. He saw numerous doctors and took an ever-changing array of medicines to get better. He finally had his depression under control. According to the toxicology report, the cause of death was due to a fatal interaction between depression meds, anxiety meds, and an opiate. Opiates being mentioned along with the term "substance abuse", coupled with "rockstar" stereotypes immediately conjure up images of hard drug use and addiction, which simply couldn't be further from the truth in Casey's instance. What the toxicology report doesn't show is that before our leaving for tour, Casey had a root canal and he was prescribed Vicodin (an opiate) for the pain. Once again, Casey was not involved in anything illegal, nor was he a substance abuser.

JT Woodruff said, "We won't add another guitar player or add another screamer... In our albums, it'll always say 'Casey Calvert: guitar/vocals.'" Bucciarelli told an interview, "We don't need another screamer... If the fans want screaming, they can provide it themselves."

=== Fragile Future and Rhapsody Originals (2008–2009) ===
Hawthorne Heights released a demo for their new song "Come Back Home" on their MySpace in 2007. A reprised version of the song became one of the twelve tracks which was selected for the band's third studio album. A second song came out on their Myspace, a cover of the Smashing Pumpkins song "Bullet with Butterfly Wings", which was contributed to MySpace's tribute to The Smashing Pumpkins. The cover song, however, did not become a track on the album.

Hawthorne Heights and Victory Records patched up their relationship and the band's third album, Fragile Future, was released with the label on August 5, 2008. Jeff Schneeweis produced the album. The lead single "Rescue Me" was released on July 22, 2008. Hawthorne Heights performed "Rescue Me" on The Tonight Show with Jay Leno after the album's full release, on September 18, 2010, promoting Fragile Future.

Rhapsody Originals was released exclusively for Rhapsody as the first EP by Hawthorne Heights on August 26, 2008. It was recorded by Rhapsody, and released as promotion for the studio album Fragile Future. It contains three live acoustic songs from Fragile Future, and one from their second studio album, If Only You Were Lonely. Hawthorne Heights performed on Linkin Park's Projekt Revolution 2008 on the Revolution Stage with former labelmates Atreyu, Armor For Sleep, Street Drum Corps, and 10 Years. Joining Linkin Park on the main stage was Chris Cornell, The Bravery, Busta Rhymes, and Ashes Divide. When the band played songs from either The Silence in Black and White or If Only You Were Lonely, Micah Carli handled Casey Calvert's unclean vocal parts.

=== Skeletons and Midwesterners: The Hits (2009–2011) ===
Hawthorne Heights posted a blog on their MySpace saying that they had officially signed with Wind-up Records in addition to writing and recording a new record. The band revealed that while there was not a new member of the band and no replacement had been made for Calvert, the album would feature a new "screamer". While on tour, Hawthorne Heights announced that Carli would be providing screaming vocals for the band.

As the album was being recorded, lead singer JT Woodruff and drummer Eron Bucciarelli referenced two songs from the record on several occasions, leading many to believe that they would be released as singles. Acoustic versions of the two songs were said to have been recorded. The songs are entitled "Here I Am" and "Nervous Breakdown". "Nervous Breakdown" became the first single from the album on March 23, 2010. On October 2, 2009, both Woodruff and Buicarelli posted updates on their Twitter accounts saying that they had just finished gang vocals for the record. Woodruff said, "Just finished up doing gang vocals on a few songs. Return to hardcore!" On October 14, an e-mail was sent to those on the official mailing list telling fans that the album would be titled Skeletons and would be released in early 2010. Here is the e-mail:

Lots of big HH news for you today folks!

For starters, we will release our new album, titled Skeletons, in early 2010! Secondly, as you should know already, we're kicking off Never Sleep Again '09 with Just Surrender, Monty Are I, Punchline, Anarbor, and Nightbeast on November 2! Get your tickets here and get them today because we will be giving away a limited amount of collectible download cards at each show which include one of our new songs, "Unforgivable" along with some other goodies.

This is your first chance to hear some of our new music, so make sure you get your tickets early and get to the shows early, because once they're gone, you'll have to wait until the album comes out! We'll see you this Fall!

Not all of the bands mentioned, however, ended up joining Hawthorne Heights for the 2009 Never Sleep Again tour. As promised, download cards for the song "Unforgivable" were distributed while on tour. In addition, a song entitled "End of the Underground" was performed live.

After the Never Sleep Again 2009 tour, frontman Woodruff began performing several solo acoustic shows with songs he had written outside of Hawthorne Heights. The track listing for the album was announced on February 5, 2010. Skeletons was released on June 1, 2010. According to Woodruff's February SayNow voice message (also uploaded on the band's Twitter), Micah Carli plays ukulele, mandolin, and various other "weird instruments" in the lute family on many of the bonus tracks on Skeletons. Victory Records announced the release date for their "best of" compilation of Hawthorne Heights songs, entitled Midwesterners: The Hits. The album was released on November 9, 2010, and contains 16 songs taken from the band's first three Victory Records' studio albums.

=== Cardboard Empire and EP trilogy (2011–2012) ===
In July 2011, Hawthorne Heights parted ways with Wind-up Records and created their own record label, Cardboard Empire. The band self-released a trilogy of EPs, beginning with Hate, which was released on August 23, 2011. Each EP was released within four or five months of the prior release. Between releases the band embarked on various tours in North America. On August 11, 2011, the album art and track listing for Hate was revealed. The next day the band premiered one of the EP's tracks, "Four White Walls". The EP leaked onto the internet on August 21, 2011. Hawthorne Heights planned to release a music video for each track from Hate, the first for the song "Is This What You Wanted?".

On April 24, 2012, the band announced that the second EP in the trilogy, titled Hope, would come out on June 5, 2012. They announced dates for their Summer of Hope tour, in support of the EP, which began on June 1 and ended on July 14. Their first single from Hope, entitled "New Winter", is the only song by Hawthorne Heights to be featured on MTV in almost five years. During their Autumn of Hope European tour, they did an interview in a bathtub.

=== Zero, line-up changes and Bad Frequencies (2013–2020) ===
It was announced that the band had signed with Red Entertainment. They released a new album titled Zero on June 25, 2013 and they played at Vans Warped Tour 2013 on all of the dates. During the announcement, touring guitarist Mark McMillon of The Story Changes was introduced as an official member.

On June 8, exactly 10 years after Hawthorne Heights' debut album, The Silence in Black and White, was released, an acoustic version of the album was released on InVogue Records. The band embarked on a tour to celebrate the albums 10-year anniversary, kicking off the European leg in Fibber Magees in Dublin, Ireland. On June 18, it was announced that Eron Bucciarelli had parted ways from the band shortly after its release. On January 20, 2015, it was announced Micah Carli had also left. On February 13, it was announced on the band's Facebook page that they were recording new songs. The band performed at Emo Nite LA in March 2018. Hurt, the final part of the EP trilogy was released on September 18, 2015. "Pink Hearts" was made available for streaming on March 1, 2018. The group's next album, Bad Frequencies, was released on April 27 through Pure Noise Records. The band supported Silverstein on their 15-year anniversary tour of their debut album, When Broken Is Easily Fixed.

=== The Rain Just Follows Me and Lost Lights EP (2021–present) ===
During their first post-pandemic tour with peers Bayside and Senses Fail, the band released their 7th full-length album, The Rain Just Follows Me, on September 10, 2021, via Pure Noise Records. The 10-song LP was produced by Grammy-winning producer Cameron Webb. The album's lead single, "Constant Dread", features guest vocals by Brendan Murphy, the frontman for Counterparts, a Canadian band. On September 8, 2023, the band released a 5-track EP called Lost Lights. In 2024 drummer Chris Popadak left the band without any official announcement. In Spring 2025, Hawthorne Heights provided direct support on Chiodos' All's Well That Ends Well 20th Anniversary Tour. Dango Cellan of Amber Pacific played drums for Hawthorne Heights.

== Musical style and influences ==
Traditionally, Hawthorne Heights' music has been characterized as "angst-fueled." The band has been categorized as being emo, post-hardcore, screamo, pop-punk, and rock. Likewise, Hawthorne Heights's albums have been tagged as alternative rock by iTunes. Hawthorne Heights have been said to be indie rock and indie emo. Eron Bucciarelli, the band's drummer, noted that the band's sound has "always been pigeon holed as emo or screamo". In the same interview he said that the band prefers to be referred to simply as "a rock band". Frontman JT Woodruff told The Fresno Bee in 2018: "After all these years it's hard to get caught up in sub genres, because categorizing things doesn't matter much. At heart, we are a rock band. We try to write music with melody, angst and lyrics that matter to us. When you are singing about real life events, and trying to move past tragedy, it can be emotional. So I'm happy to be considered emotional. If we can't help each other work through these issues, what are we really doing?"

While commenting on the band's first album, The Silence in Black and White, Eron said that the "triple guitar attack" allows them to "add a lot of layering effects and intricacies to our music along with legitimately pulling in different musical styles." The album includes feminine backing vocals provided by band member Micah Carli's sister, Graci Carli giving many of the songs a broader emotional spectrum not limited by gender. Hawthorne Heights began to be recognized as melodic hardcore due to the release of If Only You Were Lonely. After "softening their lyrical stance, incorporating melancholy keyboards, and adding upbeat melodies which were a... counterbalance to their screaming backup chants" their unique sound became more recognized.

Even after the death of one of the guitarists, Hawthorne Heights' sound continued to evolve. With the release of Fragile Future, the band used elements of power pop. Hawthorne Heights' fourth album, Skeletons, stylistically reverts to "music similar to their first two albums", yet is noticeably softer. The album "refuses to stomp over old ground" by incorporating "electro" and "pop punk" elements into a few of the tracks. The album "broke new ground by adding a unique electronica sound." In addition, various other musical styles are incorporated into Skeletons. The acclaimed blues rock track, "Gravestones," opens with "uncharacteristic western acoustics, and then delves into a more fascinating chorus, leaving the wild wild west sound and replacing it with pianos and ethereal presence." After forming their record label, Hawthorne Heights planned to release a trilogy of EPs. The first of the trilogy, Hate, lyrically is about feeling hate, anger, and solitude. According to Woodruff, Hate features more "aggressive songs" that are "a lot heavier than anything we've ever done." The EP has been compared to other screamo albums including releases by Senses Fail. Screamed vocals and breakdowns are prominent features throughout the album, reflecting the musical style of the band's first two albums. One review claimed that "this aggressive side, dormant for the past few years, has finally boiled over all at once."

Hawthorne Heights' influences include Sunny Day Real Estate, Metallica, The Get Up Kids, Taking Back Sunday, the Beatles, Green Day, Foo Fighters, Blink-182, Death Cab for Cutie, Tool, Jimmy Eat World, and Iron Maiden.

== Reception and cultural impact ==
Hawthorne Heights are regarded as "one of the biggest breakout successes of the new millennial emo-punk explosion". OC Weekly was less positive regarding the band's impact, referring to the band's lyric "cut my wrists and black my eyes" as "the epitome of what's wrong with emo." They continued: "Self harm for the sake of being sad, but flaunting it in a way that boasts about a serious issue. What were they thinking?" When asked by Northern Star in 2010 if he felt responsible for "forming what some may call the 'emo' scene", JT Woodruff said: "I don't think we really take credit for anything other than writing our own music and performing it live. Genre classifications come and go with the times, so pretty soon it will be as if it was never there. Rock music on the other hand, will be around forever. Certain people like to listen to loud and aggressive music, and that makes me happy."

== Controversy ==
=== Incident with Ne-Yo ===
In February 2006, as the band was readying the release of If Only You Were Lonely, Victory Records released two statements to fans through the band's mailing lists as well as on their MySpace, "ROCK music needs your support" and "the No. 1 slot belongs to us." They asked fans to go into chain stores and make sure that Hawthorne Heights CDs are in stock and to sabotage the sales count of Ne-Yo's record In My Own Words, which was being released on the same day. The statement said:

As for Ne-Yo, the name of the game is to decrease the chances of a sale here. If you were to pick up a handful of Ne-Yo CDs, as if you were about to buy them, but then changed your mind and didn't bother to put them back in the same place, that would work. Even though this record will be heavily stocked and you might not be able to move all the stock, just relocating a handful creates issues: Even though the store will appear to be out of stock, the computer will see it as in stock and not re-order the title once it sells down and then Ne-Yo will lose a few sales later in the week.

They ended their rallying cry by quoting Winston Churchill, "Victory at all costs, Victory in spite of all terror, Victory however long and hard the road may be; for without Victory, there is no survival." Later, group members claimed that the statements were made by their record label without their consent. On August 7, 2006, the band announced that they would be leaving Victory Records, and sued the label for breach of contract, copyright and trademark infringement, fraud and abuse. Victory Records then countersued for breach of contract and libel in September 2006. In October 2006, a Chicago judge dismissed two of the three main claims in the band's suit, ruling that the trademark and copyright violation allegations were unsound. On March 5, 2007, a federal judge in Chicago ruled that Victory Records does not hold exclusive rights for the band's recording services and that the band can record for any label. Specifically, the judge said: "The agreement contains no exclusivity provision, nor does any of its language appear to prevent [the band] from recording elsewhere during the life of the agreement". The judge later reaffirmed the ruling on May 17, 2007, saying that Hawthorne Heights is still contractually bound to deliver two albums to Victory, but may record albums which are released elsewhere.

=== Wild Justice Records lawsuit ===
On October 16, 2007, Wild Justice Records sued Hawthorne Heights for breach of an oral contract, stemming from a dispute over the management company's share of the band's revenues.

== Other projects ==
Vocalist JT Woodruff owns a coffee shop called Greenhaus Coffee in Sidney, Ohio, with his wife. In 2025, he was a guest performer in a Warped Tour tribute band. He has also released solo music under his own name.

== Band members ==
Current

- James Thomas "JT" Woodruff – lead vocals, rhythm guitar, piano, keyboards (2001–present)
- Matt Ridenour – bass, backing vocals (2001–present)
- Mark McMillon – lead guitar (2013–present, touring and session 2009–2013), unclean vocals (2015–present); rhythm guitar, backing vocals (2013–2015, touring and session 2009–2013)

Touring

- Dango Cellan – drums (2025–present)

Former

- Chris "Poppy" Popadak – drums, backing vocals (2017–2024; touring and session 2014–2017)
- Micah Carli – lead guitar (2001–2015), unclean vocals (2001–2002, 2008–2015), backing vocals (2008–2015)
- Eron Bucciarelli – drums (2001–2014)
- Casey Calvert – rhythm and lead guitar, unclean vocals (2002–2007; his death)

== Discography ==
Studio albums

- Nine Reasons to Say Goodbye (2001, as A Day in the Life)
- The Silence in Black and White (2004)
- If Only You Were Lonely (2006)
- Fragile Future (2008)
- Skeletons (2010)
- Zero (2013)
- Bad Frequencies (2018)
- The Rain Just Follows Me (2021)

== See also ==
- The Great American Beast
